= List of mottos and halls of the livery companies =

The livery companies and guilds of the City of London are listed below.

== Livery companies ==
Livery company	#	Company name	Motto	Language	Translation	Livery Hall	Ref
Honourable Company of Air Pilots	81	Air Pilots	Per Cælum Via Nostra	Latin	Our Way Is By The Heavens	Air Pilots House, Southwark	
Worshipful Society of Apothecaries	58	Apothecaries	Opiferque Per Orbem Dicor	Latin	I Am Called a Bringer of Help Throughout the World	Apothecaries' Hall, Black Friars Lane	
Worshipful Company of Arts Scholars	110	Art Scholars	Artes in urbe colamus	Latin	We foster Arts (with)in the city		
Worshipful Company of Arbitrators	93	Arbitrators	Law and Custom	English			
Worshipful Company of Builders' Merchants	88	Builders' Merchants	Stat Fortuna Domus	Latin	The Fortune of the House Continues		
Worshipful Company of Armourers and Brasiers	22	Armourers and Brasiers	We Are One	English		Armourers' Hall	
Worshipful Company of Bakers	19	Bakers	Praise God For All	English		Bakers' Hall, Harp Lane	
Worshipful Company of Barbers	17	Barbers	De Praescientia Dei	Latin	From the Foreknowledge of God	Barbers-Surgeons' Hall, Wood Street	
Worshipful Company of Basketmakers	52	Basketmakers	Let Us Love One Another	English			
Worshipful Company of Blacksmiths	40	Blacksmiths	By Hammer and Hand All Arts Do Stand	English			
Worshipful Company of Bowyers	38	Bowyers	Crécy, Poitiers, Agincourt	N/A			
Worshipful Company of Brewers	14	Brewers	In God Is All Our Trust	English		Brewers' Hall, Aldermanbury Square	
Worshipful Company of Broderers	48	Broderers	Omnia De Super	Latin	All From Above		
Worshipful Company of Butchers	24	Butchers	Omnia Subiecisti Sub Pedibus, Oves Et Boves	Latin	Thou Hast Put All Things Under Man's Feet, All Sheep and Oxen	Butchers' Hall, Bartholomew Close	
Worshipful Company of Carmen	77	Carmen	Scite, Cite, Certo	Latin	Skilfully, Swiftly, Surely		
Worshipful Company of Carpenters	26	Carpenters	Honour God	English		Carpenters' Hall, Throgmorton Avenue, London Wall	
Worshipful Company of Chartered Accountants	86	Chartered Accountants	True and Fair	English			
Worshipful Company of Chartered Architects	98	Chartered Architects	Firmnesse, Commodite, Delyte	English			
Worshipful Company of Chartered Secretaries and Administrators	87	Chartered Secretaries	Service with Integrity	English			
Worshipful Company of Chartered Surveyors	85	Chartered Surveyors	Modus ab Initio	Latin	Method from the Very Beginning		
Worshipful Company of Clockmakers	61	Clockmakers	Tempus Rerum Imperatur	Latin	Time is the Commander of All Things		
Worshipful Company of Clothworkers	12	Clothworkers	My Trust Is in God Alone	English		Clothworkers' Hall, Dunster Court, Mincing Lane	
Worshipful Company of Coachmakers and Coach Harness Makers	72	Coachmakers	Surgit Post Nubila Phoebus	Latin	The Sun Rises After The Clouds		
Worshipful Company of Communicators	113		Inform, Influence, Inspire	English			
Worshipful Company of Constructors	99	Constructors	Construction Cum Honore		Build with Honour		
Worshipful Company of Cooks	35	Cooks	Vulnerati Non Victi	Latin	Wounded Not Conquered		
Worshipful Company of Coopers	36	Coopers	Love as Brethren	English		Coopers' Hall, Devonshire Square	
Worshipful Company of Cordwainers	27	Cordwainers	Corio et Arte	Latin	Leather and Art		
Worshipful Company of Curriers	29	Curriers	Spes Nostra Deus	Latin	Our Hope is in God		
Worshipful Company of Cutlers	18	Cutlers	Pour Parvenir A Bonne Foy	Anglo-Norman French	To Succeed Through Good Faith	Cutlers' Hall, Warwick Lane	
Worshipful Company of Distillers	69	Distillers	Drop as Rain, Distil as Dew	English			
Worshipful Company of Drapers	3	Drapers	Unto God Only Be Honour and Glory	English		Drapers' Hall, Throgmorton Avenue, Throgmorton Street	
Worshipful Company of Dyers	13	Dyers	Da Gloriam Deo	Latin	Give Glory to God	Dyers' Hall, Dowgate Hill	
Worshipful Company of Educators	109	Educators	Per Doctrinam ad Lucem	Latin	Through Learning to Light		
Worshipful Company of Engineers	94	Engineers	Certare Ingenio	Latin	Use Skills to the Best of One's Abilities		
Worshipful Company of Entrepreneurs	112	Entrepreneurs	Dare, Create, Succeed	English			
Worshipful Company of Environmental Cleaners	97	Environmental Cleaners	Tergere Est Servare	Latin	To Clean Is To Preserve		
Worshipful Company of Fan Makers	76	Fan Makers	Arts and Trade United	English			
Worshipful Company of Farmers	80	Farmers	Give Us Our Daily Bread	English		Farmers & Fletchers Hall, Cloth Street	
Worshipful Company of Farriers	55	Farriers	Vi et Virtute	Latin	By Strength and by Virtue		
Worshipful Company of Feltmakers	63	Feltmakers	Decus et Tutamen	Latin	An Ornament and a Safeguard		
Worshipful Company of Fishmongers	4	Fishmongers	All Worship Be To God Only	English		Fishmongers' Hall, London Bridge (City end)	
Worshipful Company of Fletchers	39	Fletchers	True and Sure	English		Farmers & Fletchers Hall, Cloth Street	
Worshipful Company of Founders	33	Founders	God, The Only Founder	English		Founders' Hall, Cloth Fair	
Worshipful Company of Framework Knitters	64	Frameknitters	Speed, Strength and Truth United	English			
Worshipful Company of Fruiterers	45	Fruiterers	Deus Dat Incrementum	Latin	God Gives the Increase		
Worshipful Company of Firefighters	103	Firefighters	Flammas Oppugnantes Fidimus Deo	Latin	Fighting Fire, We Trust in God		
Worshipful Company of Fuellers	95	Fuellers	In carbone robur nostrum	Latin	Our Strength is in coal		
Worshipful Company of Furniture Makers	83	Furniture Makers	Straight and strong	English		Furniture Makers' Hall, Austin Friars	
Worshipful Company of Gardeners	66	Gardners	In The Sweat Of Thy Brows Shalt Thou Eate Thy Bread	English			
Worshipful Company of Girdlers	23	Girdlers	Give Thanks To God	English		Girdlers' Hall, Basinghall Avenue	
Worshipful Company of Glass Sellers	71	Glass Sellers	Discordia Frangimur	Latin	Discord Weakens		
Worshipful Company of Glaziers and Painters of Glass	53	Glaziers	Lucem Tuam Da Nobis Deo	Latin	O God, Give Us Your Light	Glaziers' Hall, London Bridge (Southwark)	
Worshipful Company of Glovers	62	Glovers	True Hands and Warm Hearts	English			
Worshipful Company of Gold and Silver Wyre Drawers	74	Gold and Silver Wyre Drawers	Amicitiam Trahit Amor	Latin	Love Draws Friendship		
Worshipful Company of Goldsmiths	5	Goldsmiths	Justitia Virtutum Regina	Latin	Justice is Queen of Virtues	Goldsmiths' Hall, Foster Lane	
Worshipful Company of Grocers	2	Grocers	God Grant Grace	English		Grocers' Hall, Princes Street	
Worshipful Company of Gunmakers	73	Gunmakers	Probis Civibus Canones Probentur	Latin	May guns be proved for honest citizens	The Proof House, 48-50 Commercial Road, Whitechapel	
Worshipful Company of Haberdashers	8	Haberdashers	Serve and Obey	English		Haberdashers' Hall, West Smithfield	
Worshipful Company of Hackney Carriage Drivers	104		Cum Scientia Servimus	Latin	With Knowledge We Serve		
Worshipful Company of Horners	54	Horners	no motto				
Worshipful Company of Human Resource Professionals	114	Human Resources	Putting People First in the World of Work	English			
Worshipful Company of Information Technologists	100	Information Technologists	Cito	Latin	Swiftly	Information Technologists' Hall, Bartholomew Close	
Worshipful Company of Innholders	32	Innholders	Hinc Spes Affulget	Latin	Hence Hope Shines Forth	Innholders' Hall, College Street	
Worshipful Company of Insurers	92	Insurers	Omnium Defensor	Latin	Protector of All	Insurers' Hall ^{(closed)}	
Worshipful Company of International Bankers	106		A Natione ad Nationem	Latin	Nation to Nation		
Worshipful Company of Ironmongers	10	Ironmongers	God Is Our Strength	English		Ironmongers' Hall, Aldersgate Street	
Worshipful Company of Joiners and Ceilers	41		Join Loyalty With Liberty	English			
Worshipful Company of Launderers	89		Cleanliness is next to Godliness	English		Launderers' Hall, (Note: Launderers' share Glaziers' Hall with Glaziers' and Scientific Instrument Makers') London Bridge (Southwark)	
Worshipful Company of Leathersellers	15		Soli Deo Honor et Gloria	Latin	Honour and Glory to God Alone	Leathersellers' Hall, Garlick Hill	
Worshipful Company of Lightmongers	96	Lightmongers	Dominus illuminatio mea et Salus mea	Latin	The Lord is my light and my help		
Worshipful Company of Loriners	57		no motto				
Worshipful Company of Makers of Playing Cards	75		Corde Recto Elati Omnes	Latin	With an Upright Heart All Are Exalted		
Worshipful Company of Management Consultants	105		Change through Wisdom	English			
Worshipful Company of Marketors	90		Mercatura Adiuvat Omnes	Latin	Marketing Benefits Everyone		
Honourable Company of Master Mariners	78		Loyalty and Service	English		HMS Wellington, Temple Pier	
Worshipful Company of Masons	30		God is our Guide	English			
Worshipful Company of Mercers	1		Honor Deo	Latin	Honour to God	Mercers' Hall, Ironmonger Lane	
Worshipful Company of Merchant Taylors	6 (Note: The Skinners' and Merchant Taylors' Companies alternate their precedence each year. See also: At sixes and sevens)		Concordia Parvae Res Crescunt	Latin	In Harmony Small Things Grow	Merchant Taylors' Hall, Threadneedle Street	
Worshipful Company of Musicians	50		Preserve Harmony	English			
Worshipful Company of Needlemakers	65		They Sewed Fig Leaves Together And Made Themselves Aprons	English			
Worshipful Company of Nurses	111						
Worshipful Company of Painter-Stainers	28		Amor Queat Obedientiam	Latin	Love Can Compel Obedience	Painters' Hall, Little Trinity Lane	
Worshipful Company of Pattenmakers	70		Recipiunt Foeminae Sustentacula Nobis	Latin	Women Receive Support From Us		
Worshipful Company of Paviors	56		God Can Raise To Abraham Children of Stone	English			
Worshipful Company of Pewterers	16		In God is all my Trust	English		Pewterers' Hall, Oat Lane	
Worshipful Company of Plaisterers	46		Let Brotherly Love Continue	English		Plaisterers' Hall, London Wall	
Worshipful Company of Plumbers	31		Justicia Et Pax	Latin	Justice and Peace		
Worshipful Company of Poulters	34	Poulters	Remember Your Oath	English			
Worshipful Company of Saddlers	25	Saddlers	Hold Fast, Sit Sure; Our Trust Is In God	English		Saddlers' Hall, Gutter Lane	
Worshipful Company of Salters	9	Salters	Sal Sapit Omnia	Latin	Salt seasons everything (implies that "Wit improves discourse")	Salters' Hall, Fore Street	
Worshipful Company of Scientific Instrument Makers	84	Scientific Instrument Makers	Sine Nobis Scientia Languet	Latin	Science Languishes Without Us		
Worshipful Company of Scriveners	44		Scribite Scientes	Latin	Write, Ye Learned Ones (formerly: Litera Scripta Manet translated as The Written Word Remains)		
Worshipful Company of Security Professionals	108		Res Homines Libertates	Latin	Property, People and Liberty		
Worshipful Company of Shipwrights	59	Shipwrights	Within the Ark Safe Forever	English			
Worshipful Company of Skinners	7	Skinners	To God Only Be All Glory	English		Skinners' Hall, Dowgate Hill	
City of London Solicitors’ Company	79	Solicitors	Lex Libertatis Origo	Latin	Freedom's foundation is the Law		
Worshipful Company of Spectacle Makers	60	Spectacle Makers	A Blessing to the Aged	English			
Worshipful Company of Stationers and Newspaper Makers	47	Stationers and Newspaper Makers	Verbum Domini Manet in Eternum	Latin	The Word of the Lord Endures Forever	Stationers' Hall, Ave Maria Lane	
Worshipful Company of Tallow Chandlers	21	Tallow Chandlers	Ecce Agnus Dei Qui Tollit Peccata Mundi	Latin	Behold the Lamb of God, Who Takes Away the Sins of the World	Tallow Chandlers' Hall, Dowgate Hill	
Worshipful Company of Tax Advisers	107	Tax Advisors	Veritas Caritas Comitas	Latin	Truth Charity Fellowship		
Worshipful Company of Tin Plate Workers	67		Amore Sitis Uniti	Latin	May You Be United In Love		
Worshipful Company of Tobacco Pipe Makers and Tobacco Blenders	82		Producat Terra	Latin	Out of the Earth (May the Earth bring forth)		
Worshipful Company of Turners	51		By Faith I Obteigne	English	By Faith I Obtain		
Worshipful Company of Tylers and Bricklayers	37		In God Is All Our Trust	English			
Worshipful Company of Upholders	49		Sustine Bona	Latin	Uphold the Good		
Worshipful Company of Vintners	11		Vinum Exhilarat Animum	Latin	Wine Cheers the Mind	Vintners' Hall, Upper Thames Street	
Worshipful Company of Water Conservators	102		Nulla vita sine aqua	Latin	No life without water		
Worshipful Company of Wax Chandlers	20		Truth is the Light	English		Wax Chandlers' Hall, Gresham Street	
Worshipful Company of Weavers	42		Weave Truth With Trust	English			
Worshipful Company of Wheelwrights	68		God Grant Unity	English			
Worshipful Company of Woolmen	43		Lana Spes Nostra	Latin	Wool Is Our Hope		
Worshipful Company of World Traders	101		Commerce and honest friendship with all	English			
Worshipful Company of Actuaries	91	Actuaries	Experience Foretells	English			

== Companies without liveries ==
Company	Motto	Language	Translation	Hall	Ref
Company of Watermen and Lightermen	At the Commandment of our Superiors	English		Watermen's Hall, St-Mary-at-Hill	
Worshipful Company of Parish Clerks	Unitas societatis stabilitas	Latin	Unity is the support of Society		
