= Christopher Histed =

British businessman (born 1964)

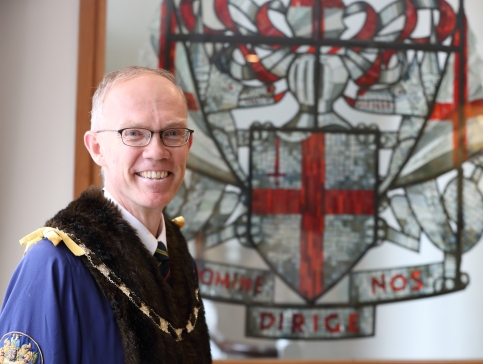
- Christopher Histed of The Worshipful Company of Information Technologists
- Born: Kent, England
- Occupations: Businessman, information technologist, entrepreneur

Christopher Histed (born 1964) is a British businessman and entrepreneur with a career in media, the Internet and consultancy. Born in 1964, he attained a Postgraduate Diploma in Journalism from City University, London and a BSc in Combined Studies at the University of Leicester, following his education at Eltham College.

== Career ==
=== Public service for Parliament, City of London and pro-bono activity ===
Histed serves as Past Master and is a liveryman of the Worshipful Company of Information Technologists, the 100th livery company of the City of London which received a royal charter in June 2010; he was Master of the Worshipful Company of Information Technologists for the year 2016 – 2017. He is a Freeman of the City of London, and a Liveryman of the Worshipful Company of Pewterers.

In addition to his business activities, he has been a member of the Parliamentary IT Committee (PITCOM). His pro bono activities include providing guidance, consultancy and online services to charities and voluntary sector bodies. His pro-bono work has included projects for World Autism Awareness Day, the Royal Corps of Signals, Autistica, UK disability charity Radar Citizens Advice, the Parliamentary All Party Group on Autism, e-Skills UK, IT 4 Communities, National Autistic Society & others.

Chris has been a Governor at Lilian Baylis Technology School in Lambeth, Trustee at The Vision Charity, serves in the Army Reserves, and served as a board director at the Association of Business Communicators.

In His Majesty King Charles’ 2024 Birthday Honours List and Operational Awards List for services to Defence, he was awarded a Four-star Commander Strategic Command Commendation.

=== Business career ===
Histed is the co-founder of Publitas Consulting, which provides strategic advice and guidance to board and head-of-service level at local authorities, NHS, universities and central government.

The first decade of his career was spent running traditional media portfolios starting in 1986 at Centaur Media plc, followed by seven years at Emap Business Communications where he became a publishing director.

Internet ventures and interactive television were the theme for the second decade of Histed's career, and in 1997 he moved to become head of Aspen Interactive (part of Aspen Group plc) and was responsible for major interactive projects including e-ticketing for GNER.

Then, Histed became general manager of Sky Interactive Production at British Sky Broadcasting, with P/L responsibility for Sky's web businesses, directing the teams which developed SkySports Active and SkyNews Active, the world's first interactive TV services.

Following a period as vice president at FT.com he was appointed director of strategy and UK general manager at Silicon Media Group (Silicon.com) which was sold to NASDAQ-listed CNET Networks (now part of CBS) in 2002. Next, as chief operating officer, he assisted the sale of Parliamentary Communications Ltd to Huveaux plc.

In 2003 he founded Public Technology Ltd and as CEO launched the Public Technology online information network (ten separate content driven online information sites including PublicTechnology.net).

In 2004 he founded and then ran the e-Government National Awards, the UK's public sector annual technology competition. This has been supported since inception by Cabinet Office ministers, the UK's government CIO, and has had prime ministerial input from Number 10 Downing Street and support from David Cameron, Gordon Brown & Tony Blair.

In 2009 he sold Public Technology Ltd to Sift Media Ltd.

== Publications ==
- Histed, Chris, ed. (2017). The Worshipful Company of Information Technologists: A celebration of 25 years as the 100th Livery Company of the City of London. ISBN 9780956601155.
- Histed, Chris, ed. (2017). May the Fourth 2017 at Guildhall: The Worshipful Company of Information Technologists. ISBN 9780956601193.
- Histed, Chris, ed. (2010). A Celebration of the Granting of the Royal Charter to the Information Technologists Company. The Worshipful Company of Information Technologists. ISBN 9780956601100.
