= Worshipful Company of Information Technologists =

Livery company of the City of London

Coordinates: 51°31′8.7″N 0°5′54″W

- The coat of arms of the Worshipful Company of Information Technologists
- Motto: Cito; Latin for swiftly
- Location: Bartholomew Close, City of London
- Date of formation: 1992 (full livery)
- Company association: Information technology
- Order of precedence: 100th
- Master of company: Gus Machado
- Website: wcit.org.uk

The Worshipful Company of Information Technologists, also known as the Information Technologists' Company, is one of the livery companies of the City of London. The company was granted livery status by the Court of Aldermen on 7 January 1992, becoming the 100th livery company. It received its Royal Charter on 17 June 2010 from Prince Edward.

== Overview ==
The company has over 800 members – all currently or formerly senior practitioners in the information technology industry. The Information Technologists' Company is unusual for a 'modern' (post 1926) livery company in that it has its own hall. The hall is located on Bartholomew Close, near to Barbican tube station. Prominent members of the company include Tim Berners-Lee, Vint Cerf, Sherry Coutu, Bill Gates, Tom Ilube, Mike Lynch, Ken Olisa, David Wootton, Dame Stephanie Shirley CH and several past Presidents of BCS, The Chartered Institute for IT, including Dame Stephanie.

The company ranks 100th in the order of precedence for the City livery companies. Its motto is Cito, meaning 'swiftly' in Latin, a word which also incorporates the initials of the Company of Information Technologists.

The company is a member of the Financial Services Group of Livery Companies, the other twelve members of which are the Chartered Accountants, Chartered Surveyors, Actuaries, Arbitrators, International Bankers, Chartered Secretaries and Administrators, Insurers, Solicitors, Management Consultants, Marketors, Tax Advisers, and World Traders.

== Activities ==
The company has a significant charitable and educational programme which uses the expertise, resources and networks of its members, and it is also involved in a range of activities to promote the information technology profession. The four pillars of the company are charity, education, fellowship and industry.

The company has a number of panels through which activities are organised. It has an Ethical and Spiritual Development Panel, which considers such topics as the ethical and spiritual implications of the Internet – running colloquia on that topic in the House of Lords as far back as 1997.

=== Working with charities ===
The company works with a wide range of non-profit organisations with the aim of helping them to gain the maximum benefit from their IT. Members provide pro-bono IT advice (usually at a strategic level). In addition, iT4Communities is the national IT volunteering programme, introducing volunteer IT professionals to charities needing IT help and support. iT4C was set up by the Worshipful Company in 2002 and since then has registered over 5,000 volunteers and more than 2,500 charities. iT4C has delivered over £3 million worth of support to the charity sector.

=== Education ===
Currently, the Worshipful Company of Information Technologists has a partnership with Lilian Baylis Technology School in Lambeth. Previous projects include HOLNET (the History of London on the Internet), which is now incorporated into the London Grid for Learning. In 2011, together with the Worshipful Company of Mercers (the premier livery company), they opened Hammersmith Academy.

=== IT profession ===
The company runs a Journeyman Scheme which supports young IT professionals in the early stages of their career.

=== Support to the armed forces ===
The company is affiliated with the Royal Corps of Signals, the Joint Forces Cyber Group and HMS Collingwood.

It is also affiliated with 46F (Kensington) Squadron, Air Training Corps, and Beckenham and Penge Sea Cadets.

== List of recent Masters ==
Year	Master
1986/1988	Barney Gibbens OBE
1988/1989	Robert Reid CBE
1989/1990	Alan Rousell
1990/1991	Robin Laidlaw
1991/1992	Alan A. Benjamin OBE
1992/1993	Steve Shirley OBE
1993/1994	Peter Monson
1994/1995	Sir Brian Jenkins GBE
1995/1996	Ric Gainsborough Foot OBE
1996/1997	Keith Arnold OBE
1997/1998	David Mann
1998/1999	Tricia Drakes
1999/2000	Peter Cropper
2000/2001	Sir Fredrick Crawford DL
2001/2002	John Carrington
2002/2003	Peter Morgan MBE
2003/2004	Campbell McGarvie
2004/2005	Roger Graham OBE
2005/2006	John Leighfield CBE
2006/2007	Colin Knight
2007/2008	David Morriss
2008/2009	Josephine Connell OBE DL
2009/2010	Charles Hughes
2010/2011	Ken Olisa OBE
2011/2012	Jonathan Soar
2012/2013	Michael Grant
2013/2014	Michael Webster
2014/2015	Nicholas Birtles
2015/2016	Alderman Sir David Wootton
2016/2017	Christopher Histed
2017/2018	Dr Stefan Fafinski DL
2018/2019	Lady Parmley (Wendy)
2019/2020	Ray Long CB
2020/2021	Mark Holford
2021/2022	Alistair Fulton
2022/2023	Rob Wirszycz
2023/2024	Kerri Mansfield JP
2024/2025	Gary Moore

== Company chaplain ==
Father Marcus Walker

== Arms ==
Coat of arms of Worshipful Company of Information Technologists
Notes Granted 1989 Crest Out of a crown rayonny Or a demi-figure of Mercury vested Vert purfled Or over his sinister shoulder a mantle Azure lined Or on his head a petasus Argent winged Or and his dexter arm raised pointing with the index finger upwards to and supporting at its lowest point a mullet of six points irradiated Or. Escutcheon Per pale Vert and Azure, a double-warded key in pale between six mullets each of six points all irradiated, a chief Or. Supporters On the dexter a griffin and on the sinister a horse both gorged with a wreath Argent and Gules and both winged Azure the under-wings Vert and all semy of mullets of six points irradiated Or. Motto 'Cito'
