= Worshipful Company of Chartered Secretaries and Administrators =

Livery company of the City of London

The Worshipful Company of Chartered Secretaries and Administrators is one of the livery companies of the City of London. The organisation became a livery company in 1977 and received a Royal Charter 12 February 2008. The company promotes the profession by awarding grants to students aspiring to become chartered secretaries.

The company ranks eighty-seventh in the order of precedence for livery companies. Its motto is Service With Integrity.

The company is a member of the Financial Services Group of livery companies, the other 11 members of which are the Worshipful Companies of Chartered Accountants, Actuaries, Arbitrators, International Bankers, Insurers, Information Technologists, City of London Solicitors, Management Consultants, Marketors, Tax Advisers, and World Traders.
