= Worshipful Company of Actuaries =

Livery company of the City of London

The Worshipful Company of Actuaries is one of the livery companies of the City of London. The company was founded and became a livery company in 1979, on the same day as the Insurers' Company. The company supports the actuarial profession by awarding scholarships in the field.

The Actuaries' Company ranks ninety-first in the order of precedence for livery companies. Its motto is Experience Foretells and its church is St Lawrence Jewry.

Like the medieval liveries of the City of London, the company plays a full role in the governance of the city, including the election and support of the lord mayor and sheriffs.

Most importantly, through its Charity, it gives help and support to those who are less fortunate, with an emphasis on making a difference in improving education, particularly in the area of mathematics.

The company is a member of the Financial Services Group of livery companies, the other 11 members of which are the Worshipful Companies of Chartered Accountants, Arbitrators, International Bankers, Chartered Secretaries and Administrators, Insurers, Information Technologists, City of London Solicitors, Management Consultants, Marketors, Tax Advisers, and World Traders.

In 2025, the Worshipful Company of Actuaries estimated that around 4 million people were alive in the British Isles, that would otherwise not be here, without the RNLI. RNLI Press release 2025
