= Worshipful Company of Management Consultants =

Livery company of the City of London

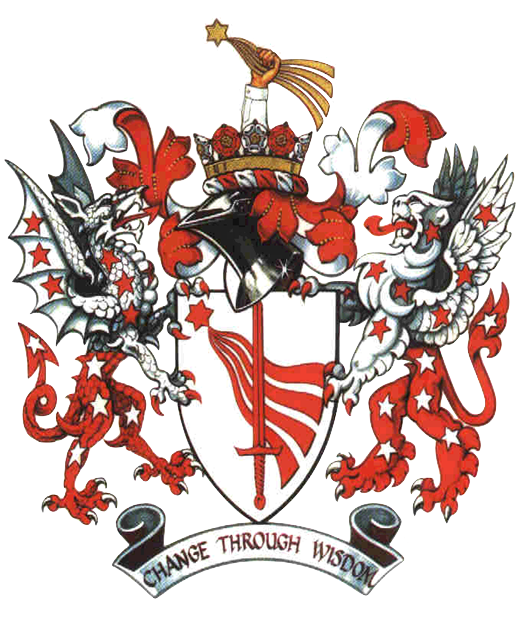
- Coat of Arms of the Worshipful Company of Management Consultants
- Motto: Change through Wisdom
- Location: London, United Kingdom
- Date of formation: 1992 (Guild); 1999 (Company without Livery); 4 May 2004 (Livery Company)
- Company association: Management consultancy profession
- Order of precedence: 105th
- Master of company: Andy Miles
- Website: wcomc.org

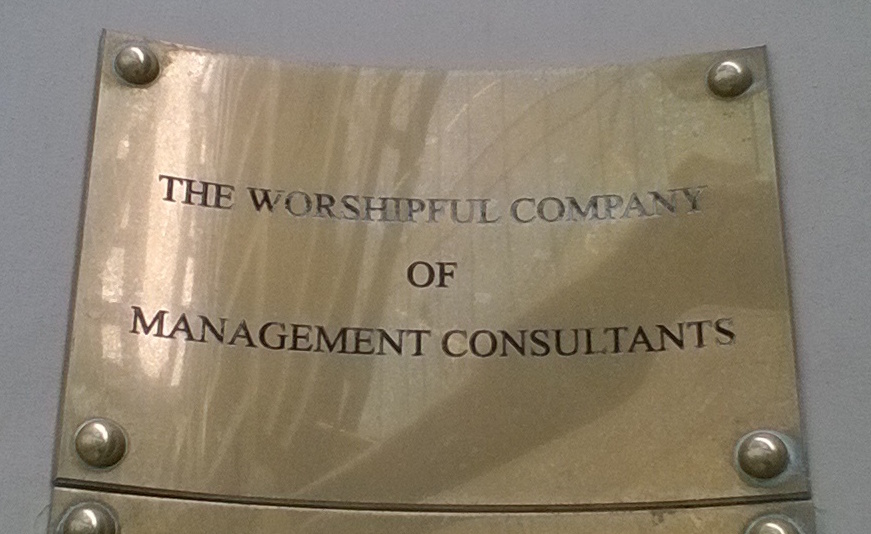
Door sign of the Worshipful Company of Management Consultants, Dowgate Hill London EC4R 2SP

The Worshipful Company of Management Consultants is one of the Livery Companies of the City of London. It draws its memberships from practising management consultants and has close links to the Management Consultancies Association and the Institute of Management Consultancy. The Company's motto is 'Change through Wisdom'.

It started as a guild in 1993 and became a company without livery in 1999. On 4 May 2004, the Court of Aldermen granted the company's petition to become the City's 105th Livery Company. The Company was presented with a royal charter by Prince Edward, Earl of Wessex, in May 2008.

Between 1993 and 2004 the Company had worked to establish a record of achievement in the fields of education and charity whilst gaining the financial resources required for admission to the livery.

The Livery Companies continue a long tradition of supporting, protecting and developing their trades and crafts, whilst acting in charitable ways within the wider community. They have also traditionally been 'clubs' in which colleagues assemble in fellowship and social intercourse. The Worshipful Company of Management Consultants continues these traditions by undertaking pro bono consultancy for charities including supporting the Centre for Charity Effectiveness (which it established in partnership with the Cass Business School of the City University in London) and forming close ties with the Sea Cadets.

The Company is a member of the Financial Services Group of Livery Companies, the other 11 members of which are the Worshipful Companies of Chartered Accountants, Actuaries, Arbitrators, International Bankers, Chartered Secretaries and Administrators, Insurers, Information Technologists, City of London Solicitors, Marketors, Tax Advisers, and World Traders.

The Company has 200 liverymen (senior members) and some junior freemen who gather six or seven times a year for formal dinners and more frequently for informal social gatherings. The Company uses the Worshipful Company of Skinners' livery hall in Dowgate for events.

A stained glass window designed by Stella Timmins to commemorate the Company was installed at the Guildhall in 2001 and was officially recognised by the Lord Mayor of London at a ceremony on 18 October 2001.

The Company's Church is St James Garlickhythe.
