= Worshipful Company of Tax Advisers =

Livery company of the City of London

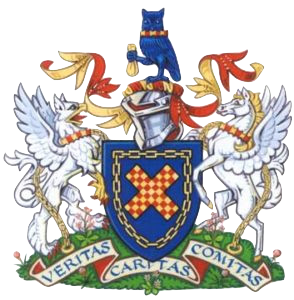
- Coat of Arms of the Worshipful Company of Tax Advisers
- Motto: Veritas, Caritas, Comitas
- Location: London, United Kingdom
- Date of formation: December 1995 (Guild); December 2000 (Company without Livery); 18 January 2005 (Livery Company)
- Company association: Taxation profession
- Order of precedence: 107th
- Master of company: Matthew Peppitt
- Website: taxadvisers.org.uk

The Worshipful Company of Tax Advisers is a livery company of the City of London. It draws its membership from tax advisers and other taxation-related practitioners.

It was established in December 1995 as a guild by members of the Chartered Institute of Taxation and became a company without livery status in December 2000. On 18 January 2005, the Court of Aldermen granted the company's petition to become the City's 107th livery company in the order of precedence. It was granted a royal charter in July 2009, which was presented to the company by Prince Richard, Duke of Gloucester, in May 2010 at St. Bartholomew's Hospital's Great Hall.

The central feature of the company's coat of arms is a large chequered diagonal cross. This X-shape suggests the Roman numeral for 10, and the historical tenth or tithe, chequered to reflect the Exchequer that used counters on a squared tablecloth. The blue of the shield symbolises the River Thames, the heart of the City of London. The chain symbolises the links of fellowship between the company's liverymen. Above the helm, the owl, as in the Arms of the Chartered Institute of Taxation to which many of the liverymen belong, represents wisdom, and extends the purse of charitable provision.

The company's motto is Veritas, Caritas, Comitas, Latin for Truth, Charity, Courteousness, reflecting its primary aims, which are:

- to enhance the standing of the profession of tax adviser in the City of London
- to support the Lord Mayor and the City of London Corporation
- to support and fund charitable and benevolent causes, and
- to promote fellowship among tax advisers.

The company is a member of the Financial Services Group of Livery Companies, the other 11 members of which are the Worshipful Companies of Chartered Accountants, Actuaries, Arbitrators, International Bankers, Chartered Secretaries and Administrators, Insurers, Information Technologists, City of London Solicitors, Management Consultants, Marketors, and World Traders.

The Company's Church is St Bartholomew the Great
