= Worshipful Company of Marketors =

Livery company of the City of London

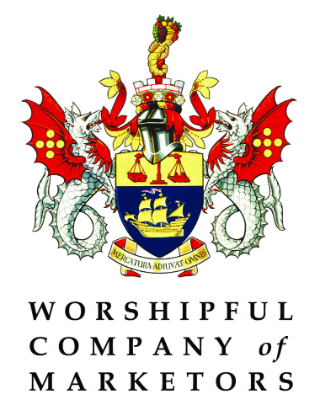
- Motto: Mercatura Adiuvat Omnes - Marketing benefits everyone
- Location: Plaisterers Hall, EC2
- Date of formation: 1975
- Company association: Marketing
- Order of precedence: 90th
- Master of company: David Elmer
- Website: www.marketors.org

The Worshipful Company of Marketors is one of the 114 livery companies of the City of London. The company was founded in 1975.

The Marketors' Company ranks ninetieth in the order of precedence for livery companies. Its church is St Bride's Church.

Marketing as a recognised professional skill standing in its own right is relatively new, and the idea for a city guild for senior marketing professionals first came about in 1969. A working party was set up in 1973 and several senior fellows of the Institute of Marketing subsequently helped gain the support of the Court of Aldermen in the City of London for establishment of a guild. Reginald Bowden, chairman of the working party, became Founder Master, serving from 1975 to 1978. On 14 April 1978 letters patent were presented to the Guild of Marketors and it became a livery company. Reginald Bowden was followed as Master by several other members of the initial working party.

The company is governed by a Court of Assistants. Each year the court elects from its ranks a Master together with a Senior, Middle and Junior Warden. The court is responsible for policy, strategy and overall management of the company, and appoints a clerk to manage its day-to-day affairs. The company's membership is drawn from senior marketing practitioners and marketing services experts, together with recognised marketing academics.

The company is a member of the Financial Services Group of Livery Companies, the other 11 members of which are the Worshipful Companies of Chartered Accountants, Actuaries, Arbitrators, International Bankers, Chartered Secretaries and Administrators, Insurers, Information Technologists, City of London Solicitors, Management Consultants, Tax Advisers, and World Traders.

== Aims and objectives ==
The mission of the Worshipful Company of Marketors is to be the City livery company for leaders in marketing. The Marketors promote marketing as a force for economic and public benefit, encouraging marketing education and marketing in practice. The company's presence in the City of London focuses on the need for marketing principles being at the heart of corporate decision-making within the Square Mile and beyond. Like all livery companies following a tradition that is centuries old, Marketors support the City of London and the mayoralty.

The company aims to promote the benefits of marketing and encourage excellence in marketing practice.

== Charitable work ==
One of the most important roles of all livery companies is their charitable work, and the support and recognition given to education and the achievement of excellence in their profession or craft. More than £40 million is given annually to charities by livery companies. Members of the Marketors are expected to make a modest annual contribution to increase the capital of the Marketors' Trust from which awards and bursaries can be funded.

The Marketors’ Charity Marketing Grants Programme, is funded by The Marketors’ Trust, and its aim is to help smaller charities that may have great ideas about marketing campaigns they would like to run but lack the funds to do so.

The trust also makes donations each year to the lord mayor's chosen charities and through advice from its Almoners, also provide assistance to members and their dependants who are in need.

As well as contributing financially to good causes, members who have skills and expertise are also encouraged to engage in voluntary outreach work giving practical marketing help and professional advice.

== Events and activities ==
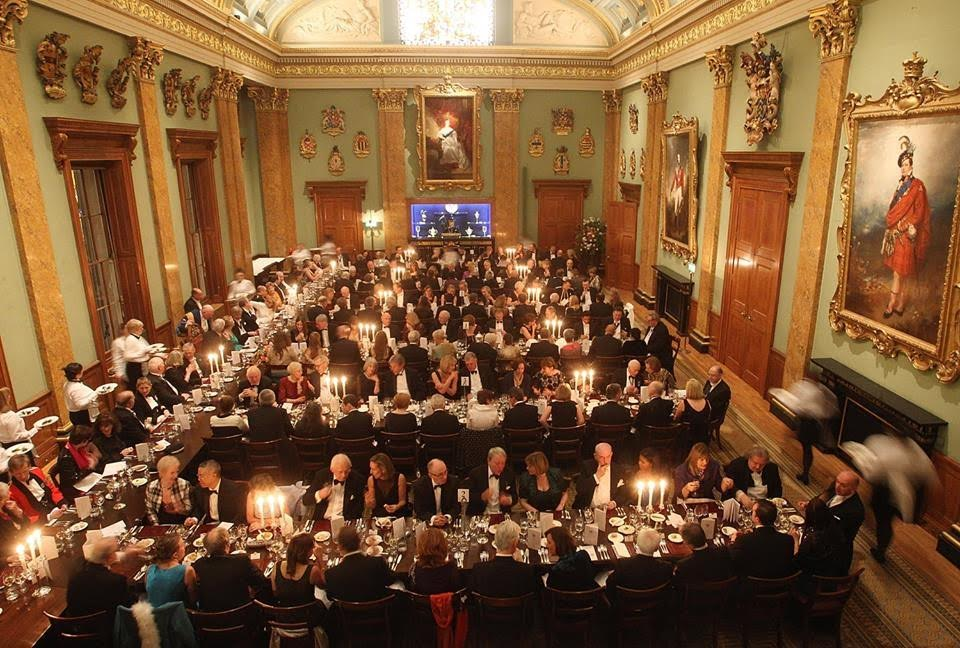
The company's Great Events are held at some of the finest livery Halls in the City of London

The Marketors provides a rich and varied programme of formal and social events which are wide-ranging and stimulating, as well as offering a better understanding of many aspects of marketing.

=== The Great Events ===
Formal occasions which are held in City livery halls or the Mansion House include several annual dinners or luncheons, and a banquet in honour of the lord mayor.

=== Professional and social events ===
There are many professional and social occasions throughout the year, most held in interesting and unusual venues many of which are exclusive to the Marketors.

The company holds a number of marketing focused events, such as lectures and seminars, with the theme of marketing in practice.

== 151 Regiment, St Dunstan's College CCF and HMS St Albans ==
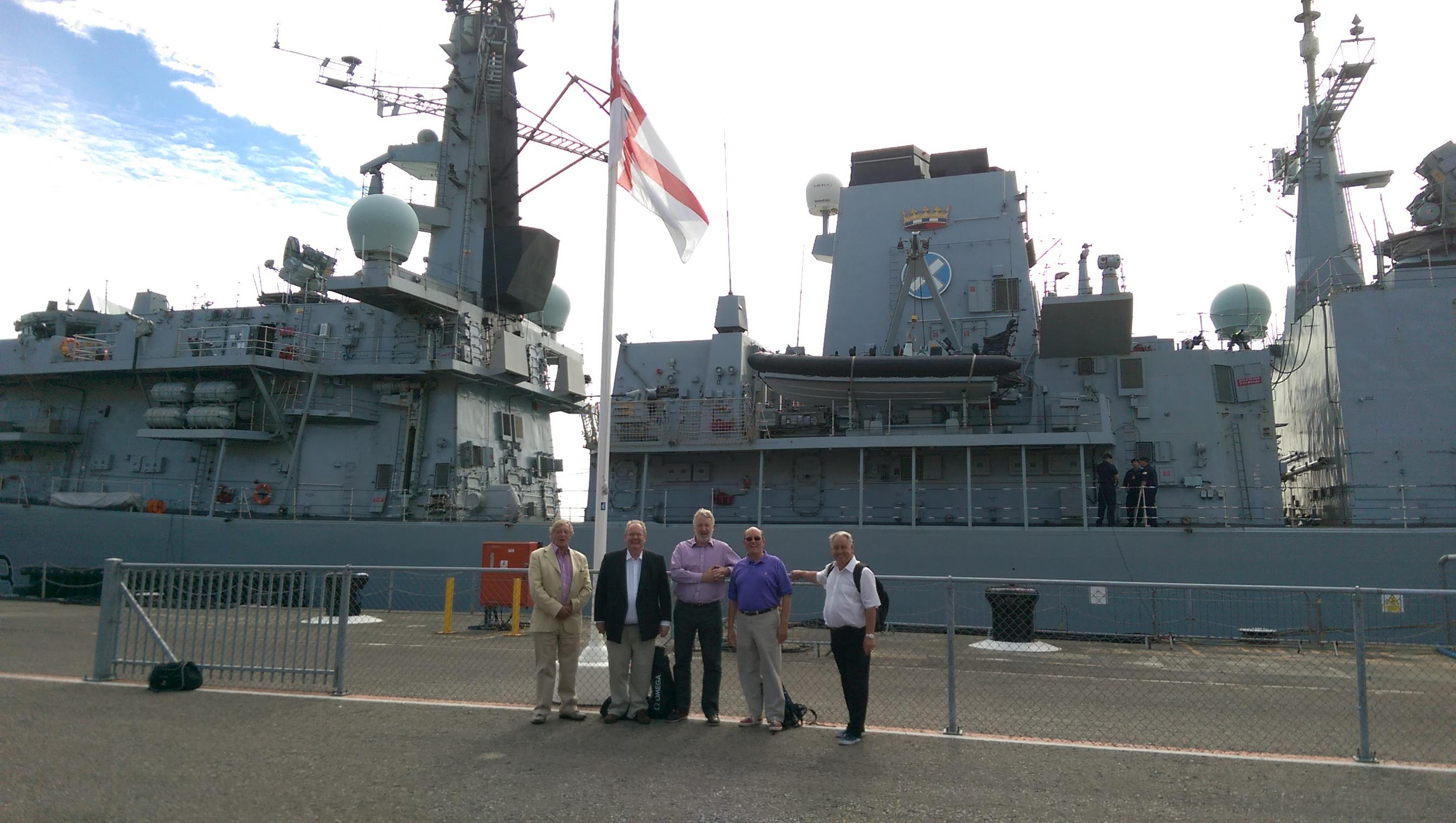
Master and members of the company visiting the company's frigate HMS St Albans at Portsmouth in 2015

Following a livery tradition, many companies maintain close supportive links with units of the armed forces and the Marketors adopted 151 (London) Transport Regiment, Royal Logistic Corps. This link with the regiment provides a further interchange of social activities and also opportunities to work with the regiment on exercises. The Marketors have also established an affiliation to St Dunstan's College Combined Cadet Force, and to the Royal Navy by way of the Type 23 frigate HMS St Albans.

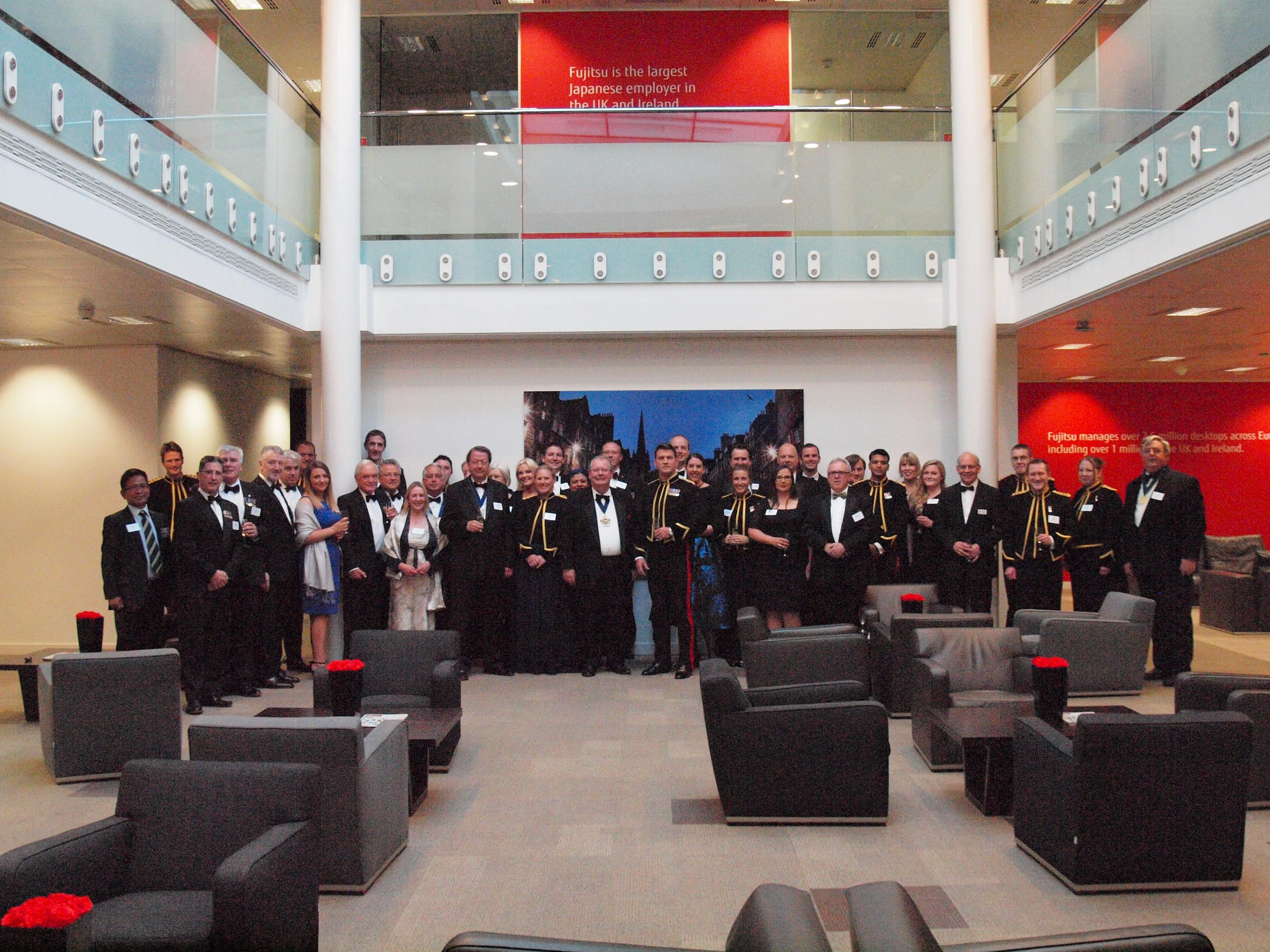
The 151 Regimental Dinner hosted by Fujitsu at its UK head office in Baker Street

== Thought leadership ==
The Thought Leadership Group (TLG) provides research leadership and promotes discussion and debate between the company, its members, other livery companies, business leaders (especially board members and those operating in the city) and the wider marketing profession. The TLG gives fresh insight into significant issues, especially those likely to have an impact at the board level, whether commercial or not. As a secondary agenda, the TLG takes opportunities to promulgate the basics of good practice to external audiences which lack such knowledge, working with other company committees.

An example of the work the group does is as part of The Tri Livery Digital Media Group alongside the Worshipful Company of Stationers and Newspaper Makers and the Worshipful Company of Information Technologists to produce a yearly seminar with notable speakers and with a specifically digital focus – an area of interest to all three companies. The group is also responsible for the production of reports into matters of topical concern.
