= Worshipful Company of Insurers =

Livery company of the City of London

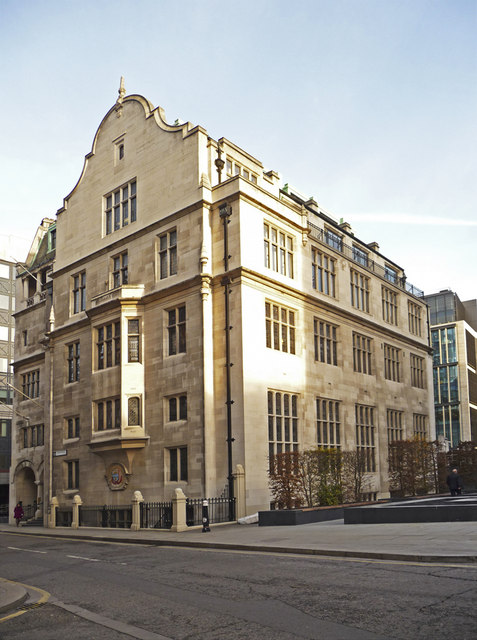
Insurance Hall, on Aldermanbury, is the home of the Worshipful Company of Insurers.

The Worshipful Company of Insurers is one of the 114 livery companies of the City of London. It ranks 92nd in the City Livery Companies' order of precedence. Its motto is Omnium Defensor, Latin for Protector of All and its church is St Lawrence Jewry.

The company was formed and became a livery company in 1979, on the same day as the Actuaries' Company. The company is not just a society for those related to insurance and reinsurance but it also supports general charities and the education of students studying in the insurance field, and assists the relief of members, retired members or members suffering hardship, and the wives, widows, children, orphans and others depending upon them.

The company is based at Insurance Hall on Aldermanbury, near London Wall, a building owned and managed by the Chartered Insurance Institute and shared with the Worshipful Company of Firefighters.

The company is a member of the Financial Services Group of Livery Companies, the other 11 members of which are the Worshipful Companies of Chartered Accountants, Actuaries, Arbitrators, International Bankers, Chartered Secretaries and Administrators, Information Technologists, City of London Solicitors, Management Consultants, Marketors, Tax Advisers, and World Traders.

The company's governance and activities are managed through a number of committees. These include iWIN, iNED and iENGAGE.
