= Worshipful Company of International Bankers =

Livery Company of the City of London

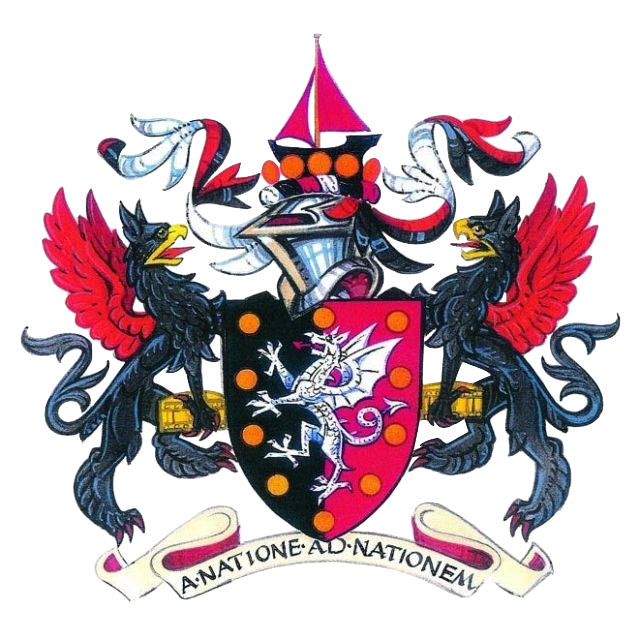
- Coat of Arms of the Worshipful Company of International Bankers
- Motto: A Natione ad Nationem
- Location: Wax Chandlers' Hall, Gresham Street, London
- Date of formation: July 2001
- Company association: Financial services
- Order of precedence: 106th
- Master of company: Tim Skeet (2025–26)
- Website: internationalbankers.org.uk

The Worshipful Company of International Bankers is one of the 114 livery companies of the City of London. It was founded in 2001 as the Guild of International Bankers, granted livery status in 2004, and received a Royal Charter in 2007. It is the 106th company in order of precedence. The Company is headquartered at Wax Chandlers’ Hall in the City of London and represents professionals across global banking and financial services.

== History ==
In 1999 the City of London Corporation extended the possibility of freedom of the City of London beyond UK, Commonwealth and European Union citizens. This led to the possibility of a company with "international" membership. The Guild of International Bankers was founded in July 2001; its first master was Sir Paul Newall. The guild provided a home for finance professionals with international backgrounds or affiliations. In October 2002 it became a company without livery. On 21 September 2004 its petition for livery status was granted by the Court of Aldermen. It was granted a Royal Charter on 10 December 2007, formally establishing it as the Worshipful Company of International Bankers.

The company ranks 106th in the order of precedence for the city livery companies. Its motto, A Natione ad Nationem, translates from Latin as "From Nation to Nation", reflecting its international character. The arms of the company are blazoned: Per pale Sable and Gules a Dragon rampant Argent within an Orle of ten Bezants.

== Membership and organisation ==
The Company draws its membership from professionals working in banking, financial services, investment, law, accountancy, and related sectors. As of the mid-2010s, it had around 800 members from more than 50 countries, representing over 250 institutions. Notable members include Bob Wigley, Angela Knight, Alderman Sir Peter Estlin, Sir Henry Angest and Anthony Scaramucci.

It is governed by a Court of Assistants and led annually by a Master and Wardens. Membership is personal (not corporate) and open to professionals across financial disciplines, irrespective of nationality or location.

== Charitable and educational work ==
Through its charitable trust, the Company has donated more than £1.3 million since its inception. Its activities focus on promoting financial literacy, education, and inclusion, especially among disadvantaged youth.

The Company collaborates with schools and universities across the UK, offering scholarships, essay prizes, and mentoring programs. It works closely with business schools, offering the WCIB Prize for top-performing students in finance-related subjects.

The Company organises talks by key figures in the financial services. Past speakers include former Governor of the Bank of England Mervyn King and former chairman of Lloyd’s of London Lord Levene.

All members agree to uphold the Company’s "Principles for Good Business Conduct", also known as the "Lord George Principles", which promote integrity, transparency, and ethical behaviour in the financial services industry.

== Civic and military affiliations ==
The Company maintains affiliations with various organisations, including:

- City of London Sea Cadets (HMS Belfast)
- 16F (Wood Green & Hornsey) Squadron, RAF Air Cadets
- 100 (Yeomanry) Regiment Royal Artillery
- 306 (Hospital Support) Regiment, Royal Army Medical Corps

It is a signatory of the Armed Forces Covenant, reflecting its commitment to the Armed Forces community.

== Financial Services Group of Livery Companies ==
The Company is a founding member of the Financial Services Group of Livery Companies, established in 2006 to support the Lord Mayor and City Corporation by providing expertise from across the finance and professional services sector, the other 11 members of which are the Worshipful Companies of Chartered Accountants, Actuaries, Arbitrators, Chartered Secretaries and Administrators, Insurers, Information Technologists, City of London Solicitors, Management Consultants, Marketors, Tax Advisers, and World Traders.

== Guild church ==
The company's church is St Mary-le-Bow
