= Worshipful Company of Arbitrators =

Livery company of the City of London

The Worshipful Company of Arbitrators is 93rd in the order of precedence of the livery companies of the City of London. The organisation formally became a livery company on 17 March 1981. The company supports education in the field of arbitration. It also functions as a charitable institution. Its motto (as displayed beneath its coat of arms) is Law and Custom, and its church is St Mary-le-Bow.

As with other livery companies, there are two main categories of membership: liverymen and freemen. Its limit of 300 liverymen was decreed by the Court of Aldermen, all of whom must be freemen of the City of London. Being admitted as a liveryman acknowledges a dedication to good government and order. Only liverymen may be part of the leadership of the company; the master, the senior warden, the junior warden and the Court of Assistants; likewise only liverymen may nominate others for membership.

Company freemen must be of good character and have an interest in and relevant experience of private dispute resolution (while many of the older companies' links with their original trades have expired, most of the newer livery companies maintain close ties with their vocations).

The Arbitrators' Company (as it is alternatively styled) arranges a programme of activities to promote arbitration and interest in arbitration in London. In such matters, it is held to be at the leading edge of ideas and development, in ways that cross boundaries between different dispute resolution specialisations in all fields, including commerce and all business and domestic activities.

The company has established charitable trusts through which it expects to continue building substantial funds, with the aim of supporting education in the field of arbitration.

It provides members with the opportunity of hearing from distinguished experts in its field and to exchange ideas and views in convivial surroundings. It is also dedicated to the promotion of the City of London as the centre of excellence for International Dispute Resolution.

The company is a member of the Financial Services Group of Livery Companies, the other 11 members of which are the Worshipful Companies of Chartered Accountants, Actuaries, International Bankers, Chartered Secretaries and Administrators, Insurers, Information Technologists, City of London Solicitors, Management Consultants, Marketors, Tax Advisers, and World Traders.
