= Worshipful Company of Chartered Accountants in England and Wales =

Livery company of the City of London

- The Accountants' Company Coat of Arms
- Motto: True and Fair
- Location: City of London, England
- Date of formation: 1977; 49 years ago
- Company association: Accountancy
- Order of precedence: 86th
- Master of company: Kevin Parry OBE
- Website: accountantslivery.org

The Worshipful Company of Chartered Accountants in England and Wales is one of the livery companies of the City of London. They were one of the earliest of the modern livery companies promoted by the Court of Aldermen from the 1970s, receiving a Grant of Letters Patent (i.e. converting from an unincorporated Guild to a livery company) in 1977 and receiving a Royal Charter in 2012. The Company is complementary to, and supported by, the Institute of Chartered Accountants (ICAEW). It promotes "honourable practice" of accounting and awards prizes to students in the field. It also supports general charities. The company ranks eighty-sixth in the order of precedence for livery companies. Its motto is True and Fair.

== Founding and history ==
Formal letters patent for the creation of the livery company were presented on 25 July 1977 by the lord mayor of London. Its first master was James M. Keith, member of the city's Court of Common Council and chief commoner for 1976–1977.

It was one of several companies formed in the 1970s, when concerns were raised that existing livery companies had few connections to the modern financial services industry in London.

The Royal Charter was granted by Queen Elizabeth II in 2012. The Court had written to the Privy Council as far back as 1978 on the subject of a charter, but were advised against "too hasty an approach to the question." The application process was re-started in 2008 and, after a number of changes to the Company's Ordinances (including adding the ability to acquire land, clarifying that membership of the ICAEW was only required at the time of joining, and the abolition of Freedom by Apprenticeship), it was finally approved by the Court of Aldermen in 2011. The Charter was formally presented by the Lord Mayor, Alderman David Wootton, to the Master, Sir John Stuttard, at a banquet in the Great Hall of the Guildhall on 10 September 2012.

== Membership ==
Membership is open to ICAEW Chartered Accountants, who initially join as Freemen. The Company's Royal Charter sets a maximum of 350 Liverymen and unlimited Freeman.

As of December 1992, the company had 100 members. At the time, former master Richard Wilkes told the Financial Times, "We do not have a large endowment. Instead of money, we've got talent."

== Charitable activities ==
The charitable arm of the Company supports education in literacy and numeracy for the disadvantaged, causes associated with the accountancy profession or the City, and more generally causes which members are personally involved in where a grant would make a material difference.

The charity made 44 grants to deserving causes in 2022-23, totalling £175,000. These include:

- Beyond Food, who provide kitchen-based training for people whose lives have unravelled, especially prisoners.
- Mansion House scholarships, funding mostly overseas students to study a UK Master's Degree in a Financial or related subject.
- City Harvest London, helping fund the Livery Food Initiative truck which redistributes potentially waste food to vulnerable Londoners.
- The Youth Ventures Programme by the Queen's Commonwealth Trust, which supports young leaders and their social impact organisations.
- The GASP Motor Project, which provides motor mechanic training to disadvantaged young people in Surrey.
- The Financial Smarties Programme by The Community Hub in Hackney, which gives financial literacy training to young women.

In 1992, the Worshipful Company of Chartered Accountants in England and Wales launched "Chartered Accountants in the Community", a programme which placed senior accountants onto the management committees of charities. The scheme aimed to place 20 to 30 attachments a year, with a focus on providing advice and professional expertise to charities, rather than day-to-day bookkeeping. The livery company had previously focused on making donations to support overseas training and rewarding student achievement.

== Fellowship and dinners ==
In July 2021, The Telegraph reported that up to a dozen business leaders were boycotting a dinner banquet at Mansion House hosted by the Worshipful Company of Chartered Accountants, because guests were being required to wear face masks and use NHS Test and Trace QR codes to enter the event.

== Armed forces affiliations ==
In common with all Livery Companies, there are links with the UK Armed forces, specifically:

- The Special Boat Service
- 47 Squadron, RAF
- Britannia Royal Naval College, Dartmouth
- Harrow and Wembley Sea Cadets
- Honourable Artillery Company

In general senior officers of these units will attend Livery events and members of the Court will visit the units each year. The Company provides financial support for the welfare of personnel and families plus the provision of non-military equipment. The Sea Cadets are supported with funding and prizes, and in turn provide a carpet guard for the annual banquet and join the Company's float in the Lord Mayor's Show. Pikemen and Musketeers from the HAC form an honour guard at high profile Company events.

== Financial Services Group of Livery Companies ==
The company is a member of the Financial Services Group of Livery Companies, the other 11 members of which are the Worshipful Companies of Actuaries, Arbitrators, International Bankers, Chartered Secretaries and Administrators, Insurers, Information Technologists, City of London Solicitors, Management Consultants, Marketors, Tax Advisers, and World Traders. Representatives meet quarterly to co-ordinate the efforts of members in promoting the City of London financial and business services sector, supporting the Lord Mayor, the Court of Aldermen, and the City of London Corporation.
