= Worshipful Company of Launderers =

Livery company of the City of London

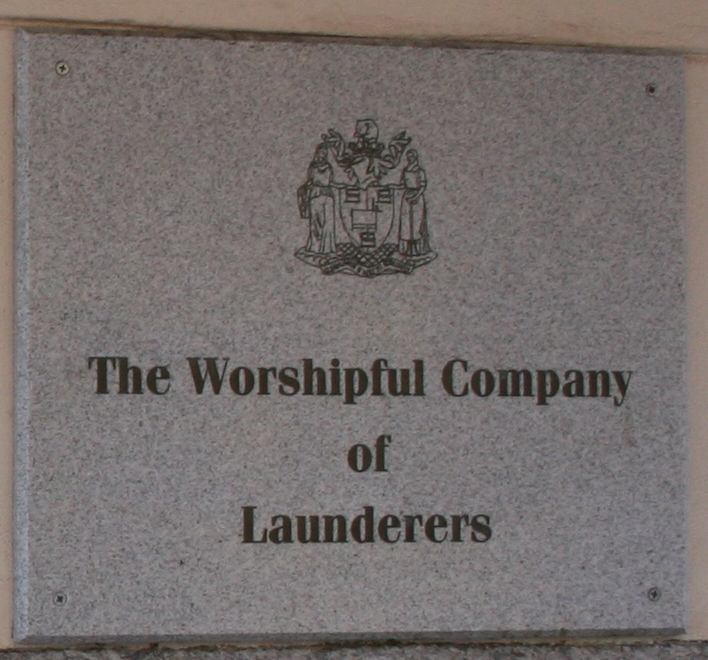

The Worshipful Company of Launderers is one of the livery companies of the City of London. The organisation, founded in 1960, became a Livery Company in 1977. It was incorporated by Charter 2010. The Company promotes the profession of the launderers by awarding scholarships to laundry students.

The Launderers' Company ranks eighty-ninth in the order of precedence for Livery Companies. The company's motto is Cleanliness is next to Godliness. Its Chaplain is The Very Reverend Andrew Nunn and its church is Southwark Cathedral.
