= Worshipful Company of Builders' Merchants =

Livery company of the City of London

- Company type: Livery Company
- Founded: 1961
- Headquarters: London, England, London, England
- Members: Liverymen

The Worshipful Company of Builders Merchants is one of the Livery Companies of the City of London. The organisation, founded in 1961, became a Livery Company in 1977. The Company promotes the profession by awarding grants to institutions related to building.

The Builders Merchants' Company ranks eighty-eighth in the order of precedence for Livery Companies. Its motto is Stat Fortuna Domus, Latin for The Fortune of the House Continues. The company's chaplain is The Reverend Canon Roger Hall MBE and its church is St Peter ad Vincula.
