= Livery company =

Trade association in the City of London

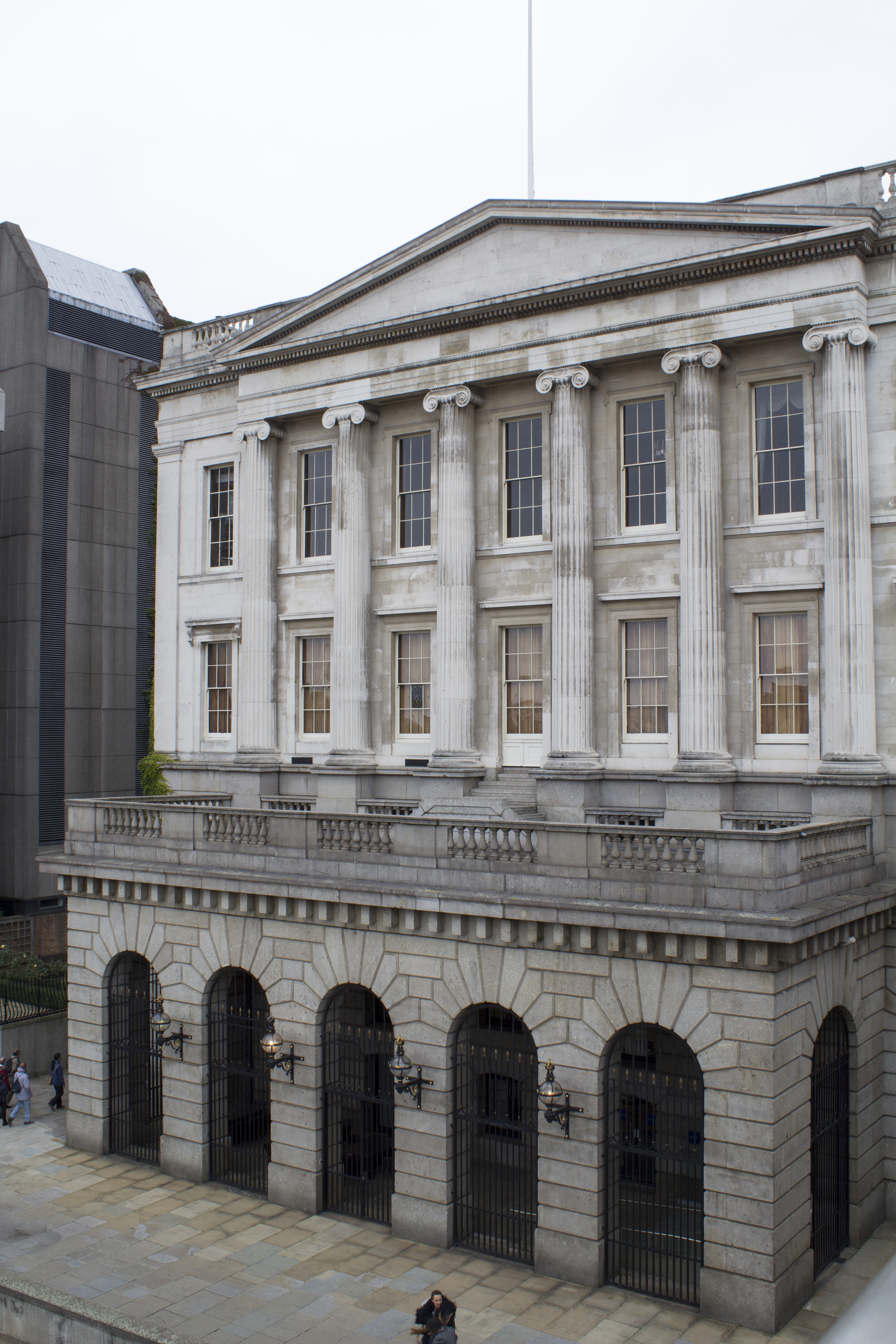
Fishmongers' Hall on London Bridge, the home of the Fishmongers' Company

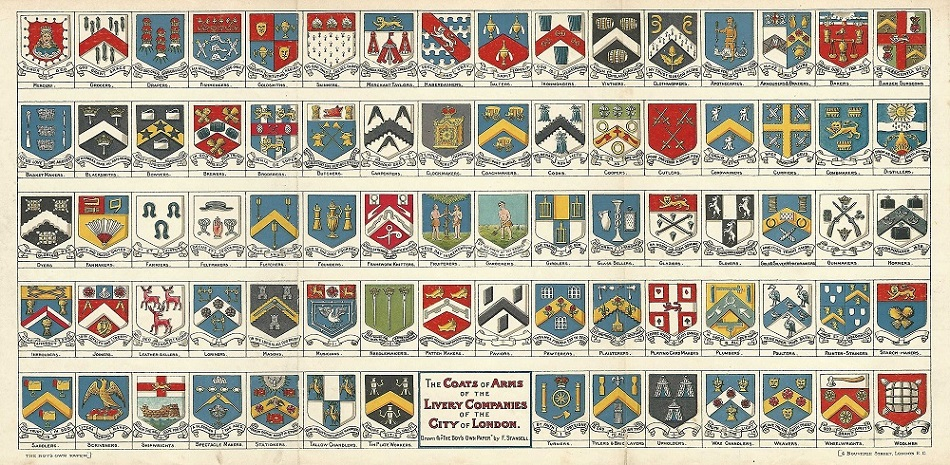
Arms of the livery companies (in 1900)

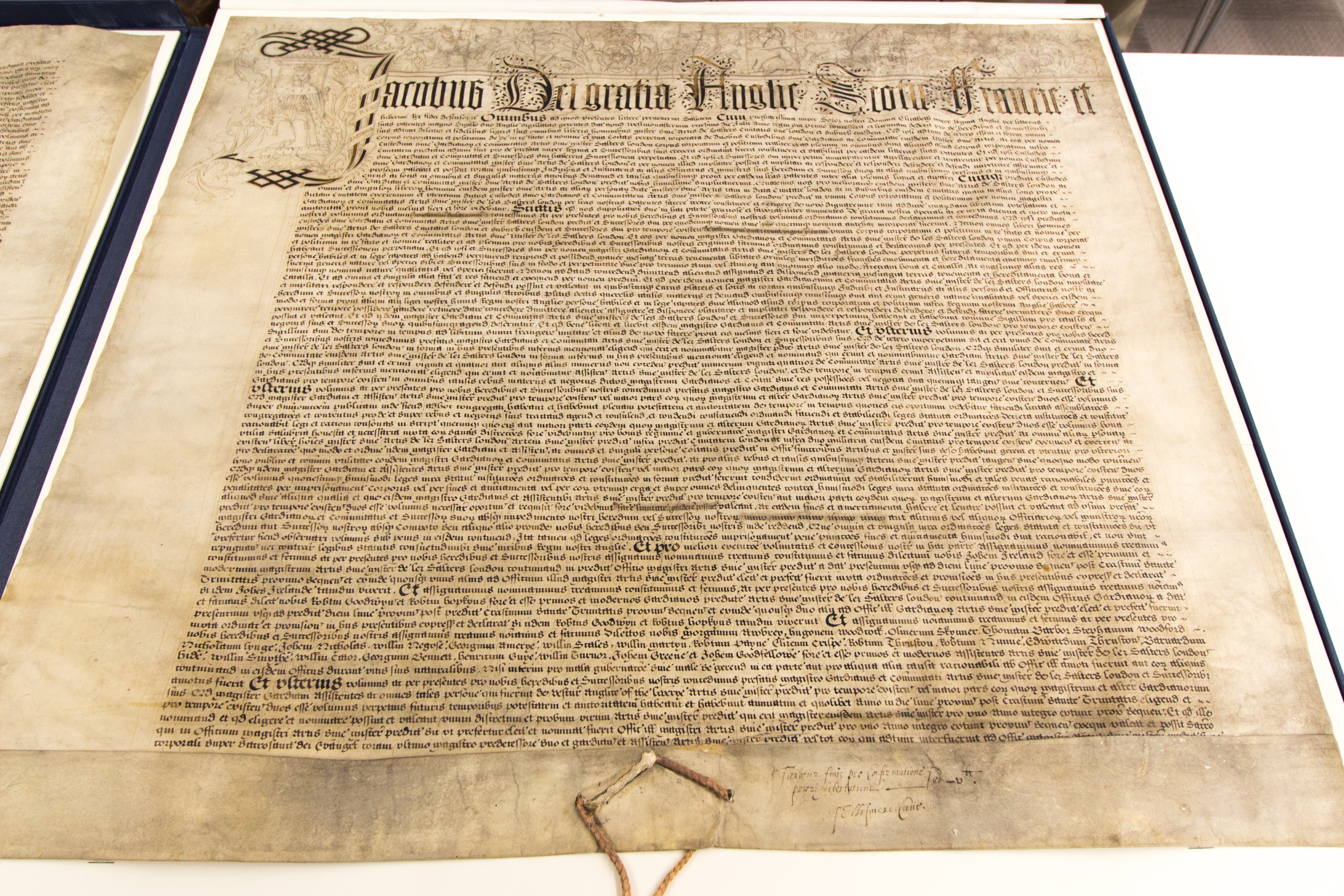
Royal charter of the Worshipful Company of Salters (James I, 1607)

A livery company is a type of guild or professional association that originated in medieval times in London, England. Livery companies comprise London's trade associations and guilds, almost all of which are styled the "Worshipful Company of" their craft, trade or profession. There are 114 livery companies as of February 2026. They play a significant part in the life of the City of London, not least by providing charitable-giving and networking opportunities. Liverymen retain voting rights for the senior civic offices, such as the Lord Mayor and Sheriffs of the City Corporation, London's historic municipal authority with extensive local government powers.

The term livery originated in the designed form of dress worn by retainers of a nobleman and then by extension to special dress to denote status of belonging to a trade. Livery companies evolved from London's medieval guilds, becoming corporations by royal charter responsible for training in their trades, as well as for the regulation of aspects such as wage control, labour conditions and industry standards. Early guilds often grew out of parish fraternal organizations, where numerous members of the same trade lived in close proximity often congregating at the same church. Like most organisations during the Middle Ages, these livery companies had close ties with the Roman Catholic Church (before the Protestant Reformation), endowing religious establishments such as chantry chapels and churches, observing religious festivals and hosting ceremonies as well as well-known mystery plays. Most livery companies retain their historical religious associations, although nowadays members are free to follow any faith or none.

After the Carmen's Company received City livery status in 1848, no new companies were established until 1926 when the Honourable Company of Master Mariners was founded (granted livery in 1932). Pre-1848 creations are known as ancient livery companies, while post-1926 creations are known as modern livery companies. The Worshipful Company of Human Resource Professionals, the newest, was granted livery status in February 2026, making it the 114th City livery company in order of precedence.

Many ancient livery companies maintain contact with their original trade or craft. In some cases, livery companies have chosen to support a replacement industry fulfilling a similar purpose today, e.g. plastics replacing the use of horn or ivory in the case of the Horners' Company and fashion for the Haberdashers' Company. Many but not all Modern Companies (those created after 1926) are representatives of today's professions and industries and operate in close association with these. However, many ancient crafts remain as relevant today as when their guilds were originally established. Some Companies still exercise powers of regulation, inspection and enforcement, e.g. the Goldsmiths' Company Assay Office, while others are awarding bodies for professional qualifications. The Scriveners' Company admits senior members of legal and associated professions, the Apothecaries' Society awards post-graduate qualifications in some medical specialities, and the Hackney Carriage Drivers' Company comprises licensed taxi drivers who have passed the "Knowledge of London" test. Several companies restrict membership to those holding relevant professional qualifications, e.g. the City of London Solicitors' Company and the Worshipful Company of Engineers. Other companies whose trade died out long ago, such as the Bowyers' Company, have evolved into being primarily charitable foundations. Many companies, for example the Pinmakers, have disappeared entirely since their creation.

Many, but not all, livery companies established a guild or meeting hall. Though these halls faced destruction in the Great London Fire of 1666 and during the Blitz of World War II, over forty companies still own or share ownership of livery halls, some elaborate and historic, others modern replacements for halls destroyed or redeveloped. Most of these halls are made available for use by other companies not having a livery hall of their own.

== Purpose ==
=== Training and industry ===
London's Livery companies originally began to be established in the 12th century, to guarantee that a member was trustworthy and fully qualified, and that the goods they produced were of reputable quality, the two-fold aim being to protect the public and to protect members from charlatans. They continued to be established until the 17th century, when political upheaval in England, particularly the Civil War, as well as the growth of London outwards from the City rendered many such livery companies, which only controlled trade within the Square Mile, less competitive or viable. Following the Stuart Restoration many livery companies were revived, but with Britain taking a leading role in the expansion of global trade the City also adapted by establishing exchanges, some of which later became guardians of business conduct.

From the 1870s, there was a further revival of livery companies, with many extending their original educational purpose to technical education, supporting new industries and providing the necessary training, most notably through the City and Guilds of London Institute.

=== Charity and education ===
From their inception, livery companies cared for their members in sickness and old age by the giving of alms. Today, they continue to support both their members, and wider charitable aims and activities such as education and training.

Numerous educational establishments in England were founded by and retain association with livery companies, among the best-known being the Haberdashers', Merchant Taylors' and Skinners' schools.

=== Support for the Armed Forces ===
Most livery companies maintain proud affiliations with regular and reserve units of the British Armed Forces, providing links between civilian and military life.

Livery companies have been active in agreeing to "uphold and support" the Armed Forces Covenant and over one hundred have either signed, or indicated that they will formally sign the Covenant in collaboration with the Ministry of defence.

=== City of London governance ===
The livery companies have always been a constituent part of the governance of the City of London. The senior members of the livery companies, i.e. liverymen, elect the City's Sheriffs, Bridge Masters, Ale Conners, Auditors and members of the City Livery Committee, and approve the aldermanic candidates for election to the office of Lord Mayor of London.

== Entry ==
Entry to a livery company may be by one of four routes:

- By invitation to become an Honorary Freeman/Liveryman/Assistant. This is rare, and is considered a great honour.
- By apprenticeship or servitude. This is nowadays less common. In earlier days, someone wishing to enter a trade would bind himself as apprentice to a member of his chosen trade. As such, he was required to do as he was instructed, and in return for strict adherence to the master's rules the apprentice learned his trade, while his master was required to provide such training that, at the end of the apprenticeship (usually seven years) the apprentice would be sufficiently knowledgeable to become a member – and a Freeman of the City of London – free of the obligations of apprenticeship.
- By patrimony. Generally, a member's son/grandson (or now also a daughter/granddaughter) who was born after the parent became a member of a company are entitled to become a member by patrimony.
- By redemption. Redemption is the path to the freedom for all others who do not qualify for apprenticeship, patrimony or by invitation and requires the payment of a fine (fee) as well as an interview or other admission procedure.

Regardless of method of entry, membership carries the same duties, responsibilities and privileges. Being clothed as a Liveryman requires the candidate to first receive the freedom of the City of London, now essentially a necessary formality, though in the past the Freedom carried benefits, such as being able to drive a flock of sheep across London Bridge at no charge.

== Governance ==
Livery companies are governed by a Master (alternatively styled Prime Warden in some companies, or Upper Bailiff of the Weavers' Company), a number of Wardens (holding various titles such as the Upper, Middle, Lower, or Renter Wardens), and a court of Assistants (board of directors), responsible for company business and electing its Master and Wardens. The "Clerk to the Company" is the most senior permanent member of staff, and is responsible for the day-to-day management of its activities.

The livery companies elect a majority of the members of the Livery Committee, a body administered at Guildhall. The committee oversees the elections of Sheriffs and the Lord Mayor, educates liverymen regarding the City Corporation's activities and represents the livery companies in communications with the City.

Membership generally falls into two categories: freemen and liverymen.

== Freemen ==
One may become a freeman, or be admitted to the "freedom of the company", upon fulfilling certain criteria: traditionally, by "patrimony", if either parent/grandparent were a liveryman of the company; by "servitude", if one has served a requisite number of years as an apprentice to a senior company member; or by "redemption", upon paying a fee. Most livery companies reserve the right to admit distinguished people, particularly in their sphere of influence, as Honorary Freeman or Liveryman. Freemen may advance to become liverymen, after obtaining the Freedom of the City of London, and with their court of Assistants' approval. Only liverymen are eligible to vote in the annual election of the Lord Mayor of London, the Sheriffs and various other City civic offices, including the Ale Conners and Bridge Masters.

== Liverymen ==
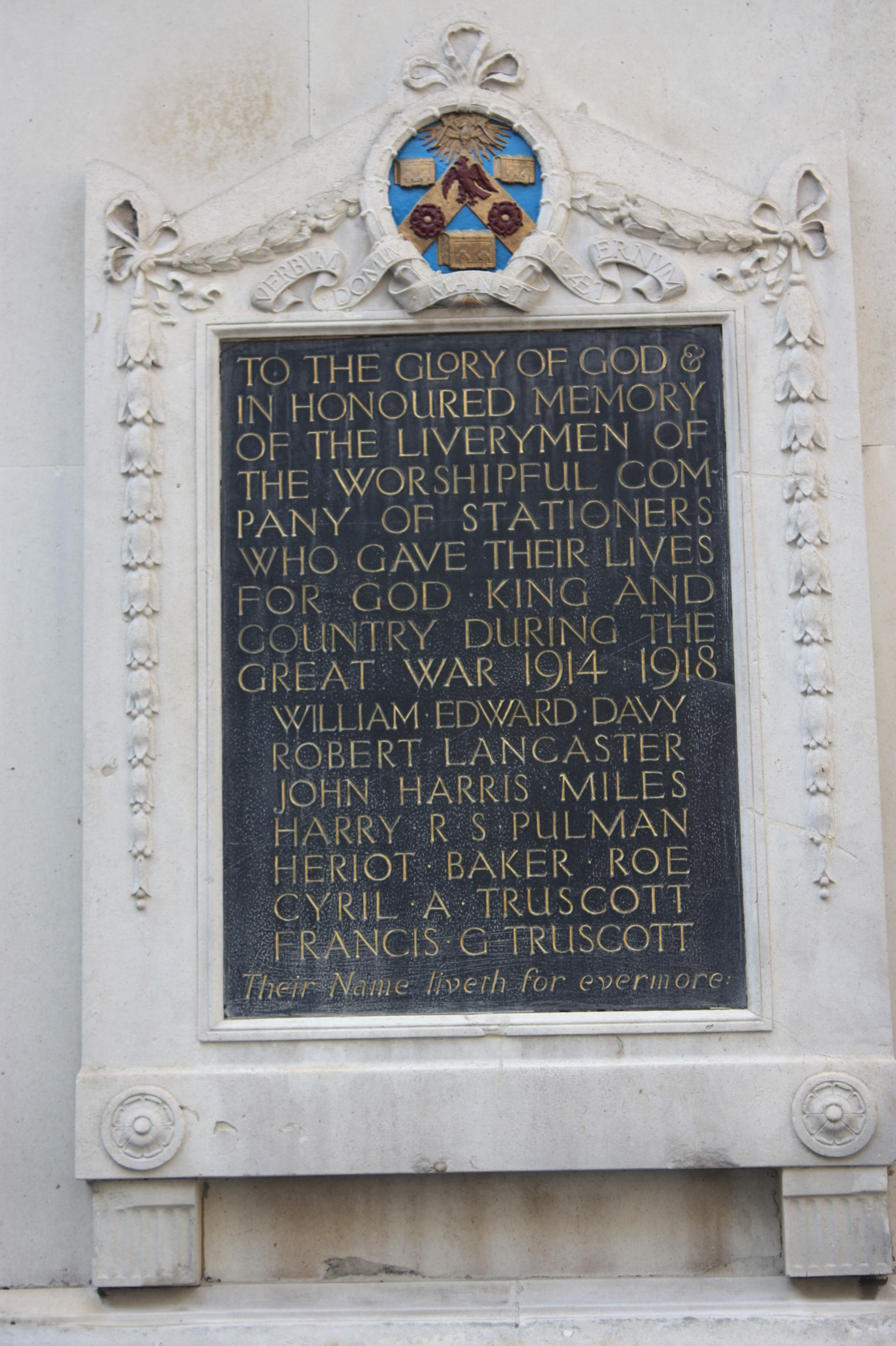
Memorial to City liverymen killed in action during the First World War, at Stationers' Hall

A liveryman is a full member of his/her respective company.

When a freeman is promoted to liveryman, the candidate is said to be 'clothed in the livery': indeed, a livery gown is placed on him or her at the Court meeting which is worn to the subsequent formal or social occasion. Thereafter only the Master, Wardens and Assistants wear livery gowns at company functions. Masters and Wardens wear them at the City's formal events, e.g. the two Common Halls and the United Guilds Service, and at the Lord Mayor's Show. Ordinarily, liverymen wear ties or brooches at formal functions and each company differs by allowing their members to wear distinctive items relevant to the occasion such as a tie, scarf, badge, cap or brooch.

Freemen are expected to advance to become liverymen by a vote of the court of each company. Liverymen no longer have any local government franchise in the City, but retain the exclusive right of voting in the election of the Lord Mayor (Michaelmas 'Common Hall' 29 September) and for the Sheriffs (Mid-Summer 'Common Hall' 24 June) held at Guildhall as a ceremonial occasion. The votes are made by 'acclamation' subject to a challenge/demand from the floor for a ballot to be held a week later. Any two liverymen may nominate a candidate for the Freedom of the City.

=== Former parliamentary election rights ===
Before the Reform Act 1832 liverymen had the exclusive right to elect the four Members of Parliament (MPs) representing the City. Between 1832 and 1918 being a liveryman was one of a number of possible franchises which could qualify a parliamentary elector in the City of London constituency, as it was a preserved ancient borough franchise under the terms of the 1832 Act.

== Livery halls ==
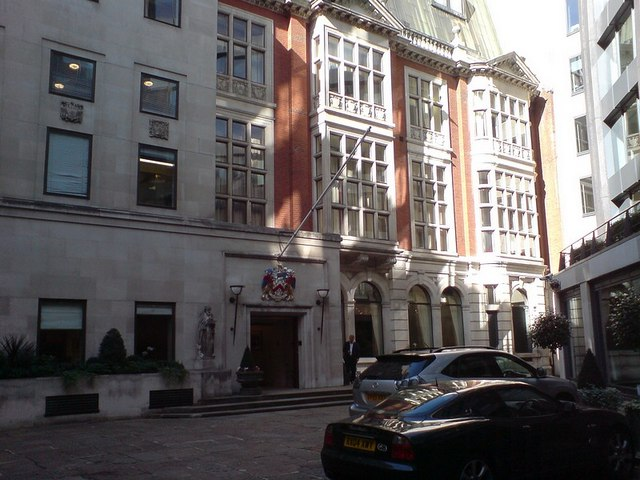
Grocers' Hall in Princes Street, home to the Grocers' Company

In the 21st century, 39 out of 114 City livery companies retain premises in London. Additionally, the Watermen's Hall in St Mary-at-Hill, which is the headquarters of the Company of Watermen and Lightermen (although not strictly a livery company) remains in regular use. Among the earliest companies known to have had halls are the Merchant Taylors and Goldsmiths in the 14th century, and the kitchen and the crypt of Merchant Taylors' Hall survived both the Great Fire of London and the Blitz, the kitchen now having been in uninterrupted use for over 600 years.

Besides part of Merchant Taylors' Hall kitchens, the oldest extant interiors of a livery hall proper are those of the Apothecaries' Society, most rooms of which date from 1668 to 1671; significant portions of the fabric of this building are also medieval, from the 13th-century priory, part of which became Apothecaries' Hall. Several companies that do not have a hall of their own share office premises within the hall of another company on a semi-permanent basis, examples being the Spectacle Makers' Company, which uses part of Apothecaries' Hall, the Marketors who are hosted by the Worshipful Company of Plaisterers, and the Worshipful Company of Shipwrights, which co-habits with the Ironmongers. Many livery halls can be hired for business and social functions, and are popular for weddings, commercial and society meetings, luncheons and dinners.

Three livery companies (the Glaziers and Painters of Glass, Launderers and Scientific Instrument Makers) share a hall in Southwark, just south the City of London, while the Worshipful Company of Gunmakers has long been based at Proof House in the London Borough of Tower Hamlets just east of the City. Companies without halls customarily book another livery hall for their formal gatherings, giving members and guests the opportunity to visit and enjoy different City livery halls by rotation. There is an attraction in belonging to a company which is peripatetic.

Blue plaques throughout the City of London indicate where companies formerly had halls.

== Precedence ==
In 1515, the Court of Aldermen of the City of London settled an order of precedence for the 48 livery companies then in existence, based on those companies' contemporary economic or political power. The 12 highest-ranked companies remain known as the Great Twelve City Livery Companies. Presently, there are 114 City livery companies, with the newer companies generally being ranked by seniority of creation. The origins of some companies, and the granting of their liveries, are now obscure.

The Merchant Taylors and the Skinners have long disputed their precedence, so once a year (at Easter) they swap between sixth and seventh places. This mix-up is a favourite theory for the origin of the phrase "at sixes and sevens", as has been pointed out by at least one Master Merchant Taylor; however, it is possible that the phrase may have been coined before the dispute arose, as it comes from the companies both receiving their Charters in 1327 with no proof surviving as to which was granted first.

=== List of companies in order of precedence ===
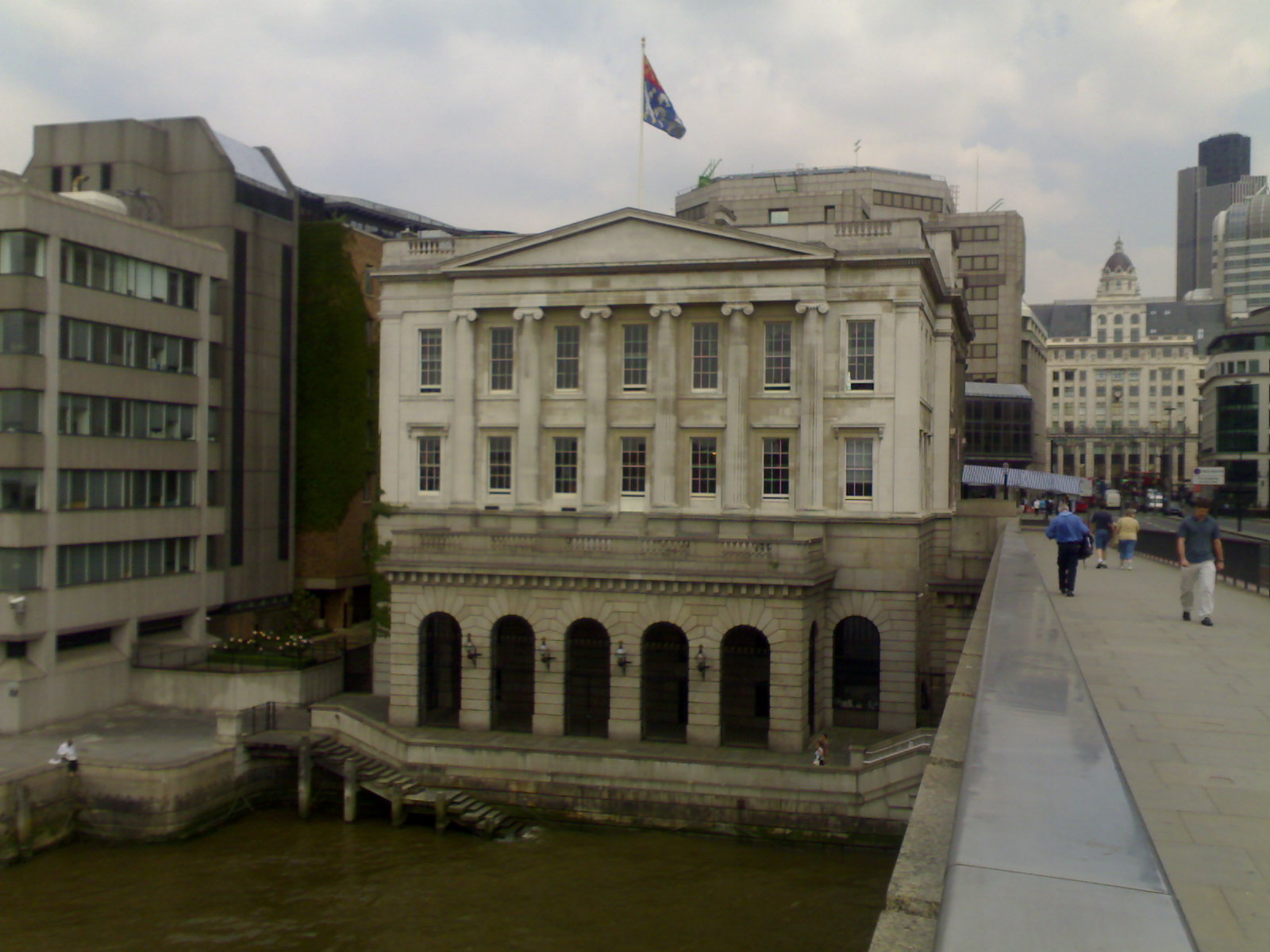
The Fishmongers' Company rank fourth in precedence

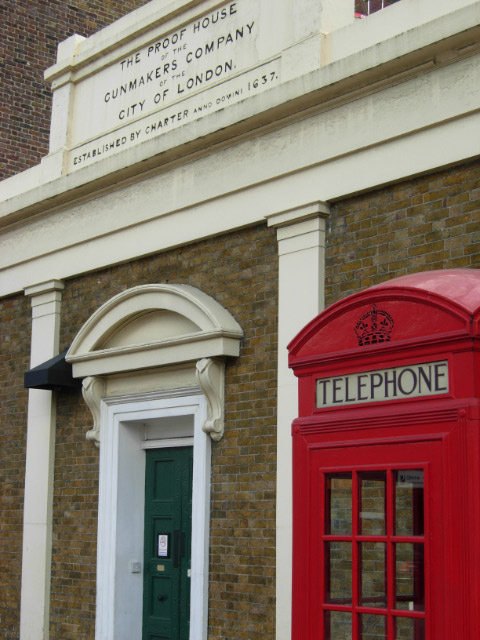
The Gunmakers' Company, 73rd in precedence, has been based at Proof House since 1675

| Order | Company | Year Charter Granted |
|---|---|---|
| 1 | Worshipful Company of Mercers (general merchants) | 1394 |
| 2 | Worshipful Company of Grocers (spice merchants) | 1428 |
| 3 | Worshipful Company of Drapers (wool and cloth merchants) | 1364 |
| 4 | Worshipful Company of Fishmongers | 1272 |
| 5 | Worshipful Company of Goldsmiths (bullion dealers) | 1327 |
| 6 | Worshipful Company of Skinners (Note: The Skinners' and Merchant Taylors' Companies alternate their precedence each year.) (fur traders) | 1327 |
| 7 | Worshipful Company of Merchant Taylors (tailors) | 1327 |
| 8 | Worshipful Company of Haberdashers (silk merchants and clothiers in sewn and fine materials, e.g. velvet) | 1448 |
| 9 | Worshipful Company of Salters (salt and chemical traders) | 1394 |
| 10 | Worshipful Company of Ironmongers | 1463 |
| 11 | Worshipful Company of Vintners (wine merchants) | 1363 |
| 12 | Worshipful Company of Clothworkers | 1528 |
| 13 | Worshipful Company of Dyers | 1471 |
| 14 | Worshipful Company of Brewers | 1438 |
| 15 | Worshipful Company of Leathersellers | 1444 |
| 16 | Worshipful Company of Pewterers (pewter and metal manufacturers) | 1474 |
| 17 | Worshipful Company of Barbers (surgeons and dentists) | 1462 |
| 18 | Worshipful Company of Cutlers (knife, sword and utensil makers) | 1416 |
| 19 | Worshipful Company of Bakers | 1509 |
| 20 | Worshipful Company of Wax Chandlers (wax candle-makers) | 1484 |
| 21 | Worshipful Company of Tallow Chandlers (tallow candle-makers) | 1462 |
| 22 | Worshipful Company of Armourers and Brasiers (armour makers and brass workers) | 1453 |
| 23 | Worshipful Company of Girdlers (belt and girdle makers) | 1449 |
| 24 | Worshipful Company of Butchers | 1605 |
| 25 | Worshipful Company of Saddlers | 1363 |
| 26 | Worshipful Company of Carpenters | 1477 |
| 27 | Worshipful Company of Cordwainers (fine leather workers and shoemakers) | 1439 |
| 28 | Worshipful Company of Painter-Stainers (artists; historically, painters of metal, wood and cloth) | |
| 29 | Worshipful Company of Curriers (leather dressers and tanners) | |
| 30 | Worshipful Company of Masons (stonemasons) | |
| 31 | Worshipful Company of Plumbers | 1611 |
| 32 | Worshipful Company of Innholders (innkeepers) | |
| 33 | Worshipful Company of Founders (metal casters and melters) | |
| 34 | Worshipful Company of Poulters (poultry dealers) | |
| 35 | Worshipful Company of Cooks | |
| 36 | Worshipful Company of Coopers (barrel and cask makers) | |
| 37 | Worshipful Company of Tylers and Bricklayers (builders) | |
| 38 | Worshipful Company of Bowyers (long-bow makers) | |
| 39 | Worshipful Company of Fletchers (arrow makers) | |
| 40 | Worshipful Company of Blacksmiths | |
| 41 | Worshipful Company of Joiners and Ceilers (wood craftsmen) | 1571 |
| 42 | Worshipful Company of Weavers | 1155 |
| 43 | Worshipful Company of Woolmen | |
| 44 | Worshipful Company of Scriveners (court scribes and notaries public) | |
| 45 | Worshipful Company of Fruiterers | |
| 46 | Worshipful Company of Plaisterers (plasterers) | |
| 47 | Worshipful Company of Stationers and Newspaper Makers (journalists and publishers) | 1557 |
| 48 | Worshipful Company of Broderers (embroiderers) | |
| 49 | Worshipful Company of Upholders (upholsterers) | |
| 50 | Worshipful Company of Musicians | |
| 51 | Worshipful Company of Turners (lathe operators) | |
| 52 | Worshipful Company of Basketmakers | |
| 53 | Worshipful Company of Glaziers and Painters of Glass | |
| 54 | Worshipful Company of Horners (horn workers and plasticians) | |
| 55 | Worshipful Company of Farriers (horseshoe makers and equine veterinarians) | 1356 |
| 56 | Worshipful Company of Paviors (road and highway pavers) | |
| 57 | Worshipful Company of Loriners (equestrian bit, bridle and spur suppliers) | 1261 |
| 58 | Worshipful Society of Apothecaries (physicians and pharmacists) | |
| 59 | Worshipful Company of Shipwrights (shipowners and maritime professionals) | 1782 |
| 60 | Worshipful Company of Spectacle Makers | 1629 |
| 61 | Worshipful Company of Clockmakers | 1766 |
| 62 | Worshipful Company of Glovers | 1638 |
| 63 | Worshipful Company of Feltmakers (hat makers) | |
| 64 | Worshipful Company of Framework Knitters | 1657 |
| 65 | Worshipful Company of Needlemakers | 1656 |
| 66 | Worshipful Company of Gardeners | |
| 67 | Worshipful Company of Tin Plate Workers alias Wire Workers | 1766 |
| 68 | Worshipful Company of Wheelwrights | 1773 |
| 69 | Worshipful Company of Distillers | 1672 |
| 70 | Worshipful Company of Pattenmakers (wooden-shoe makers) | 1717 |
| 71 | Worshipful Company of Glass Sellers | 1712 |
| 72 | Worshipful Company of Coachmakers and Coach Harness Makers | 1687 |
| 73 | Worshipful Company of Gunmakers | 1637 |
| 74 | Worshipful Company of Gold and Silver Wyre Drawers (threadmakers for military and society clothing) | 1780 |
| 75 | Worshipful Company of Makers of Playing Cards | 1792 |
| 76 | Worshipful Company of Fan Makers | 1806 |
| 77 | Worshipful Company of Carmen (vehicle drivers) | 1848 |
| 78 | Honourable Company of Master Mariners | 1932 |
| 79 | City of London Solicitors' Company (lawyers) | 1944 |
| 80 | Worshipful Company of Farmers | 1952 |
| 81 | Honourable Company of Air Pilots | 1956 |
| 82 | Worshipful Company of Tobacco Pipe Makers and Tobacco Blenders | 1960 |
| 83 | Worshipful Company of Furniture Makers | 1963 |
| 84 | Worshipful Company of Scientific Instrument Makers | 1963 |
| 85 | Worshipful Company of Chartered Surveyors | 1977 |
| 86 | Worshipful Company of Chartered Accountants in England and Wales | 1977 |
| 87 | Worshipful Company of Chartered Secretaries and Administrators | 1977 |
| 88 | Worshipful Company of Builders' Merchants | 1977 |
| 89 | Worshipful Company of Launderers | 1977 |
| 90 | Worshipful Company of Marketors | 1978 |
| 91 | Worshipful Company of Actuaries | 1979 |
| 92 | Worshipful Company of Insurers | 1979 |
| 93 | Worshipful Company of Arbitrators | 1981 |
| 94 | Worshipful Company of Engineers | 1983 |
| 95 | Worshipful Company of Fuellers (energy traders) | 1984 |
| 96 | Worshipful Company of Lightmongers (electric lighting suppliers and installers) | 1984 |
| 97 | Worshipful Company of Environmental Cleaners | 1986 |
| 98 | Worshipful Company of Chartered Architects | 1988 |
| 99 | Worshipful Company of Constructors | 1990 |
| 100 | Worshipful Company of Information Technologists | 1992 |
| 101 | Worshipful Company of World Traders | 2000 |
| 102 | Worshipful Company of Water Conservators | 2000 |
| 103 | Worshipful Company of Firefighters | 2001 |
| 104 | Worshipful Company of Hackney Carriage Drivers (licensed taxicab drivers) | 2004 |
| 105 | Worshipful Company of Management Consultants | 2004 |
| 106 | Worshipful Company of International Bankers | 2004 |
| 107 | Worshipful Company of Tax Advisers | 2005 |
| 108 | Worshipful Company of Security Professionals | 2008 |
| 109 | Worshipful Company of Educators | 2013 |
| 110 | Worshipful Company of Arts Scholars | 2014 |
| 111 | Worshipful Company of Nurses | 2023 |
| 112 | Worshipful Company of Entrepreneurs | 2025 |
| 113 | Worshipful Company of Communicators | 2025 |
| 114 | Worshipful Company of Human Resource Professionals | 2026 |

=== Coats of arms of the Great Twelve Livery Companies ===
| Name; Type of business | Date of establishment; Order of precedence | Image of arms | Blazon |
|---|---|---|---|
| Worshipful Company of Mercers (General merchants) | 1394 1st | | Gules, issuant from a bank of clouds a figure of the Virgin couped at the shoulders proper vested in a crimson robe adorned with gold, the neck encircled by a jeweled necklace crined or and wreathed about the temples with a chaplet of roses alternately argent and of the first, and crowned with a celestial crown, the whole within a bordure of clouds also proper. |
| Worshipful Company of Grocers (Spice merchants) | 1345 2nd | | Argent, a chevron gules between nine cloves six in chief and three in base proper |
| Worshipful Company of Drapers (Wool and cloth merchants) | 1361 3rd | | Azure, three clouds radiated proper each adorned with a triple crown or |
| Worshipful Company of Fishmongers (Fish and seafood mongers) | 1272 4th | | Azure, three dolphins embowed in pale between two pairs of sea luces saltirewise proper crowned or on a chief gules six keys in three saltires ward ends upwards of the second |
| Worshipful Company of Goldsmiths (Bullion dealers) | 1327 5th | | Quarterly gules and azure, in the first and fourth quarters a leopard's face or in the second and third quarters a covered cup and in chief two round buckles the tongues fesse-wise, points to the dexter all of the third |
| Worshipful Company of Skinners (Fur traders) | 1327 6th | | Ermine, on a chief gules three crowns or with caps of the field |
| Worshipful Company of Merchant Taylors (Tailors) | 1327 7th | | Argent, a royal tent between two parliament robes gules lined ermine the tent garnished or with pennon and flagstaff of the last on a chief azure a lion passant guardant or |
| Worshipful Company of Haberdashers (Silk merchants, i.e. clothiers in sewn and fine materials) | 1448 8th | | Barry nebulée of six argent and azure, on a bend gules a lion passant guardant or |
| Worshipful Company of Salters (Traders of salts and chemicals) | 1394 9th | | Per chevron azure and gules, three covered salts argent garnished or overflowing of the third |
| Worshipful Company of Ironmongers (Iron merchants) | 1463 10th | | Argent, on a chevron gules between three gads of steel azure, three swivels Or |
| Worshipful Company of Vintners (Wine merchants) | 1364 11th | | Sable, a chevron between three tuns argent |
| Worshipful Company of Clothworkers (Wool traders) | 1528 12th | | Sable, a chevron ermine between in chief two havettes argent and in base a teazel cob Or |

=== City companies without grant of livery ===
Company without Livery is a status which applies during the period between when a guild is recognised by the Court of Aldermen and when it is granted the rights of a livery. A guild initially applies to be a London Guild, and may later apply to the Court to become a Company of the City of London. After an indefinite period, such a Company of the City of London can apply to the Aldermen for livery status; if granted, they can thereafter use the honorific prefix Worshipful Company.

==== Guilds and companies aiming to obtain the grant of Livery ====
- Guild of Investment Managers

=== Other companies and organisations ===
- Worshipful Company of Parish Clerks
- Company of Watermen and Lightermen

Neither the Company of Parish Clerks nor the Company of Watermen have applied or intend to apply for livery status, which remains a long-standing City tradition. This is granted by the City Corporation in effect to control a company. The Watermen and Parish Clerks are governed by statutes and royal charters with responsibilities outside the City. The Company of Watermen and Lightermen was established by Act of Parliament in 1555 to regulate the watermen on the River Thames responsible for the movement of goods and passengers and remains the only ancient City guild to be formed and governed by Act of Parliament. They are then strictly not 'companies without livery' at all but simply 'companies'.

The Guild of Beadles are the engaged officials of primarily the City Livery Companies but is also open to those from the Ward Clubs, formed of both Hall and "Peripatetic" Beadles, and therefore are a recognised Guild within the City. Its primary function is to raise money for the Lord Mayor's charities, their own charities, as well as provide both social and supportive engagement with those within the Guild. It also assists the clerks of the Livery Companies by find replacements, both in an emergency and long term.

The Ward Beadles of the City of London are the elected officials, not representatives, of the City Wards so have constitutional standing. They are associated together for mainly communications and social activities; they are a corps rather than a guild.

City Livery Club, founded in 1914, is a livery-oriented organisation of over 1000 members based at Bell Wharf Lane near Southwark Bridge. The club's motto is uniting the livery, promoting fellowship.

The Guild of Young Freemen and the Guild of Freemen of the City of London, whilst not being livery companies, are popular associations amongst the freemen of the City, with the young freemen being open to those under the age of 40.

The Honourable Company of Freemen of the City of London of North America (headquartered in Toronto, Ontario, Canada) represents Freemen and Liverymen of the City of London living in North America.

The Worshipful Livery Company of Wales (headquartered in Cardiff). Established in 1993 and receiving a Royal Charter in 2013, the company provides fellowship for its members, supports education and makes awards to Welsh people to develop their skills and talents.

=== The Southwark Manors ===
The City Corporation of London retains the lordship of three manors in Southwark (Guildable, King's and Great Liberty).

Now membership organisations, members are eligible to serve as ceremonial officers or jurors in their relevant manorial jurisdiction. These courts retain legal-standing under the Administration of Justice Act 1977, being in no way guilds never having been related to trading and occupational activities.

=== Former livery companies ===
Guilds which at one point attained the status of livery companies and have since ceased to exist include the following:

- Combmakers
- Silk Throwsters
- Silkmen
- Pinmakers
- Soap Makers
- Hatband Makers
- Long Bowstring Makers

== Gallery ==
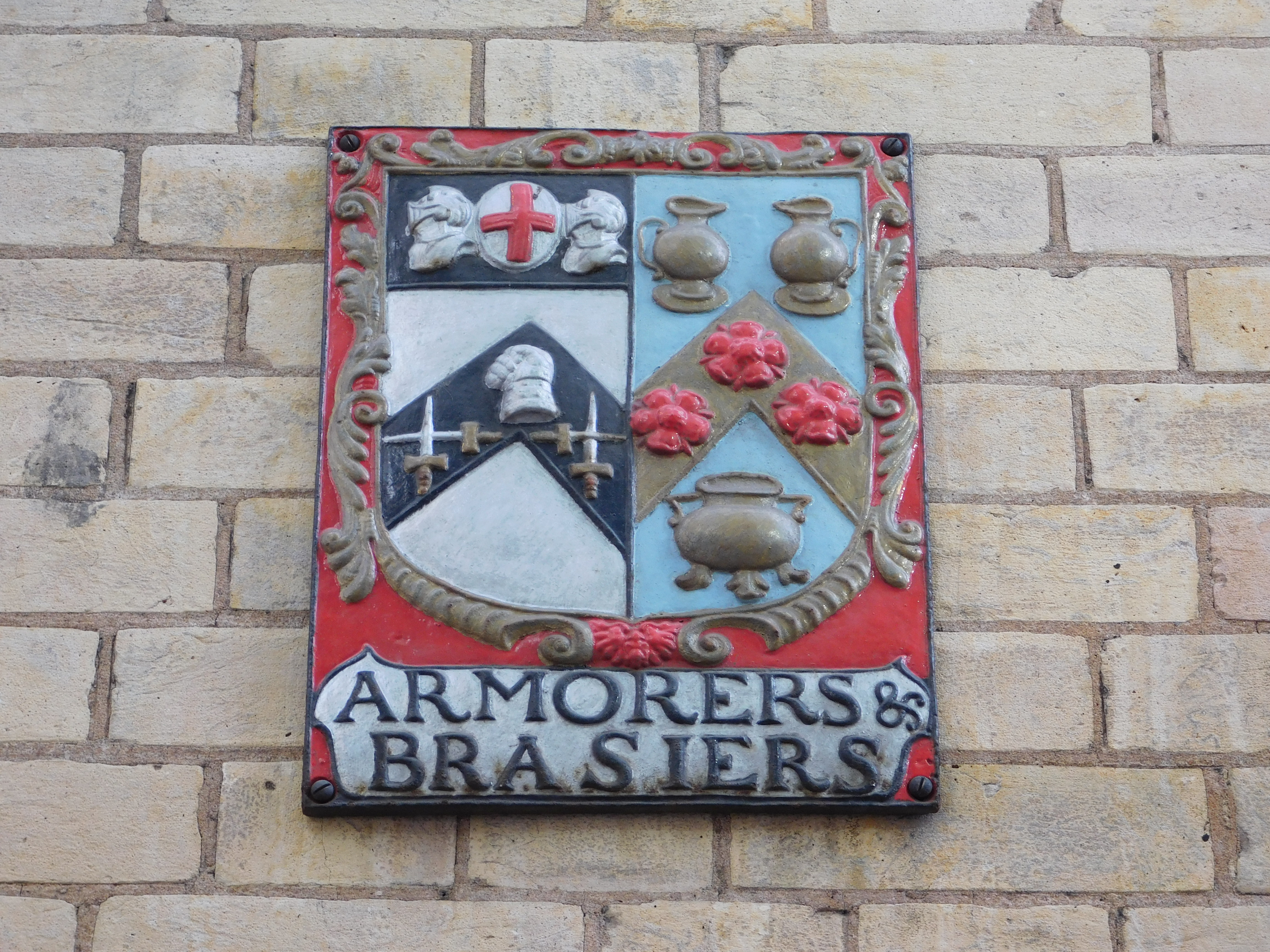
The Armourers' and Brasiers' Company: We Are One

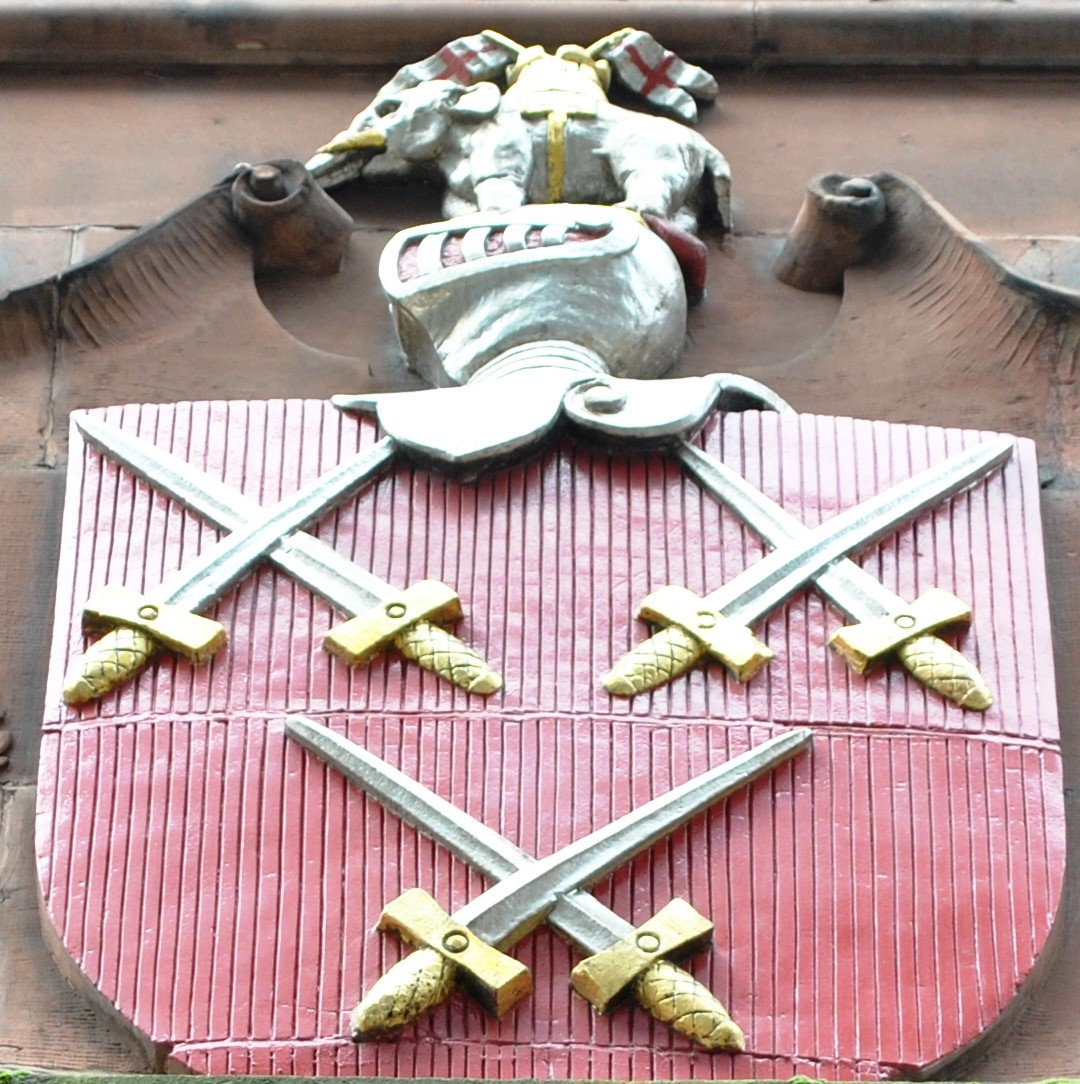
The Cutlers' Company: Pour Parvenir A Bonne Foy (To Succeed Through Good Faith)

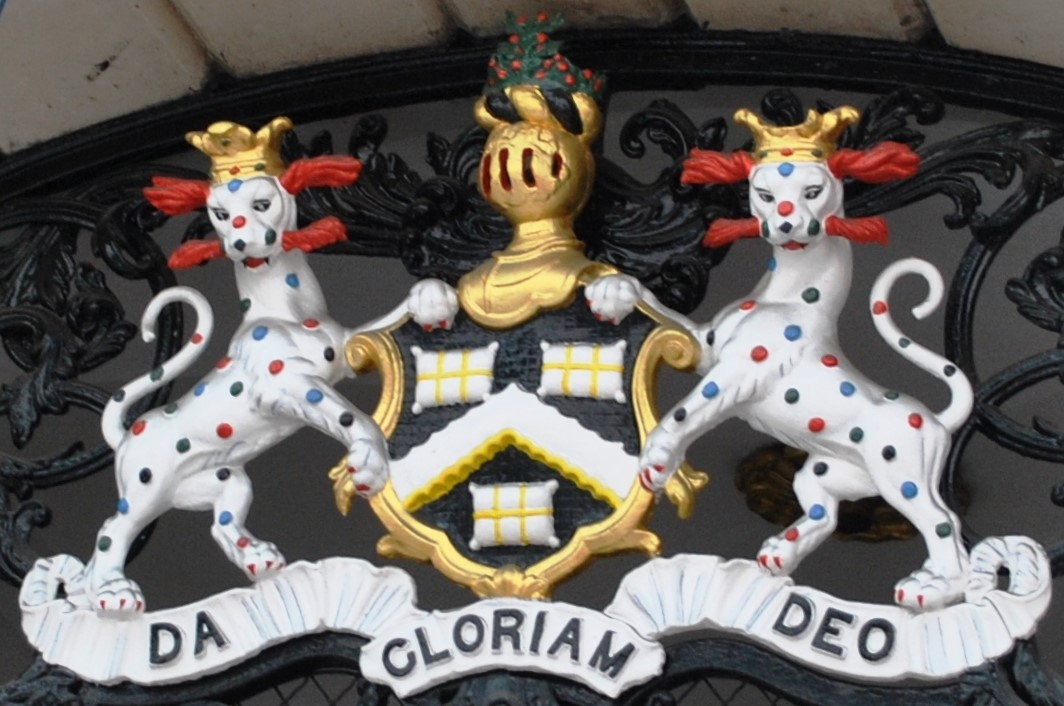
The Dyers' Company: Da Gloriam Deo (Give Glory to God)

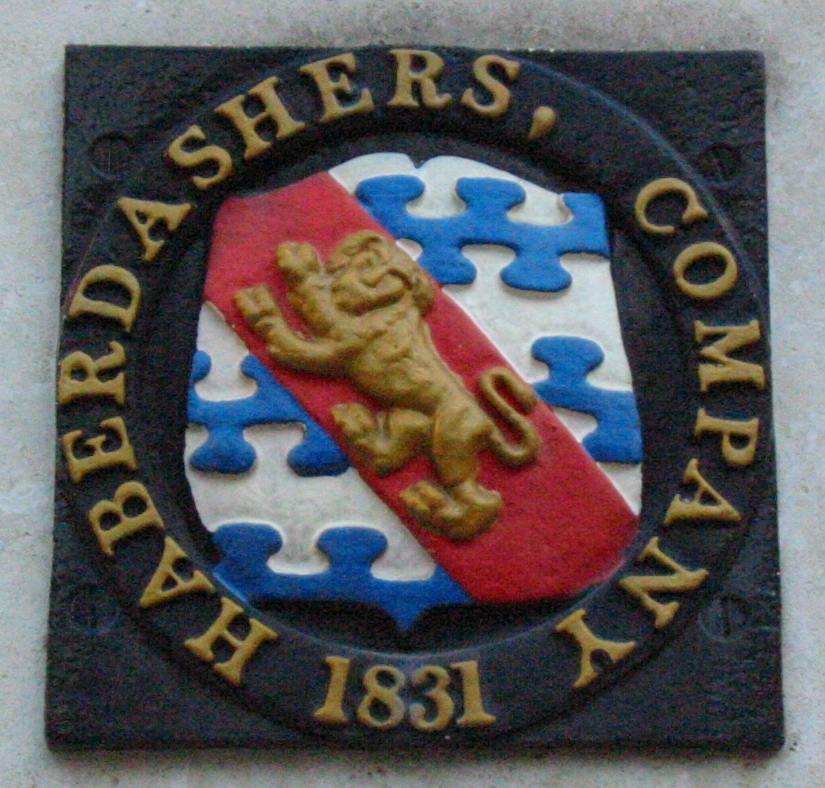
The Haberdashers' Company: Serve and Obey

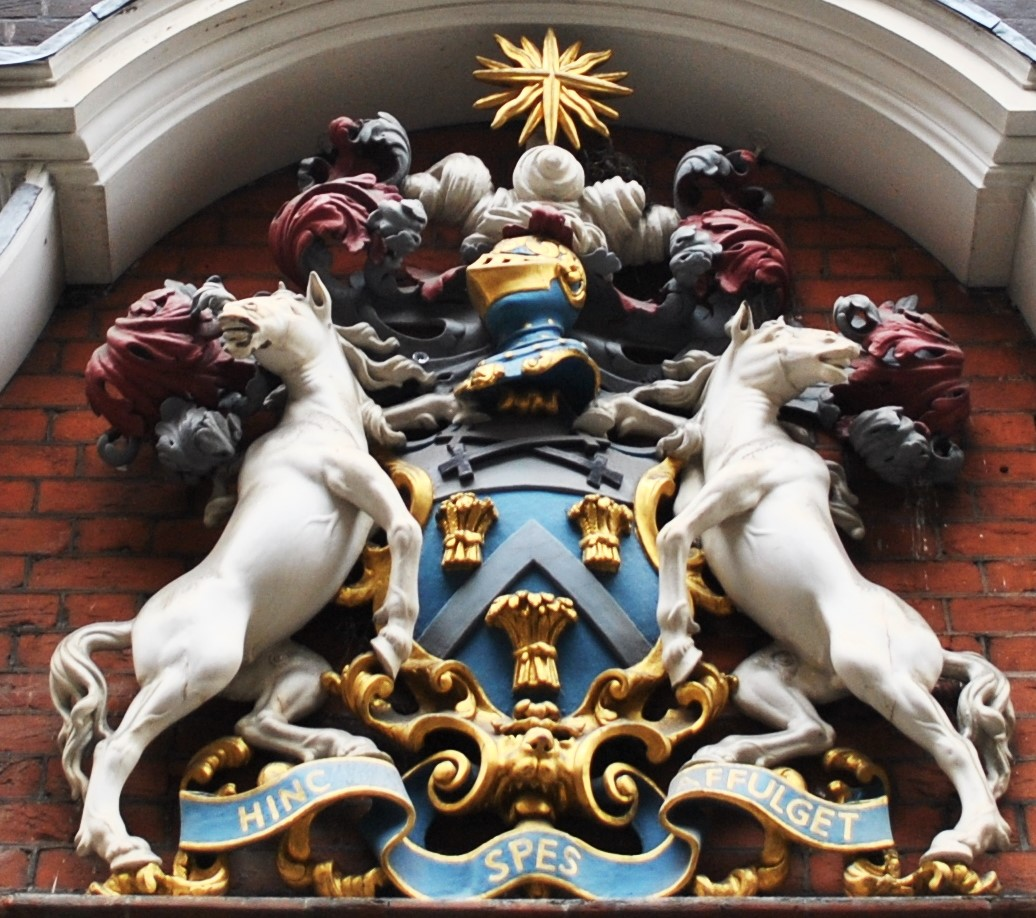
The Innholders' Company: Hinc Spes Affulget (Hence Hope Shines Forth)

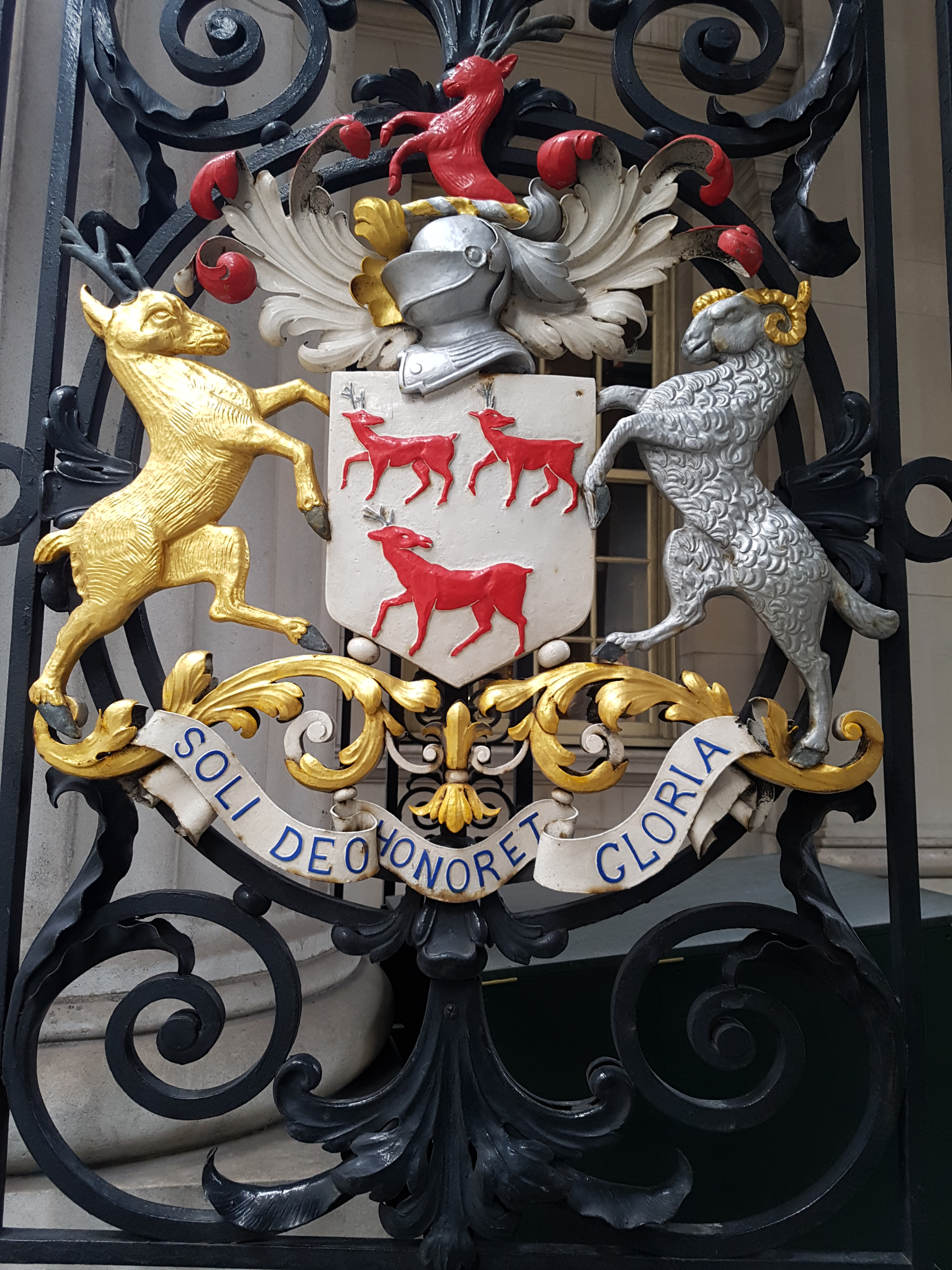
The Leathersellers' Company: Soli Deo Honor et Gloria (For Honour and Glory to God alone)

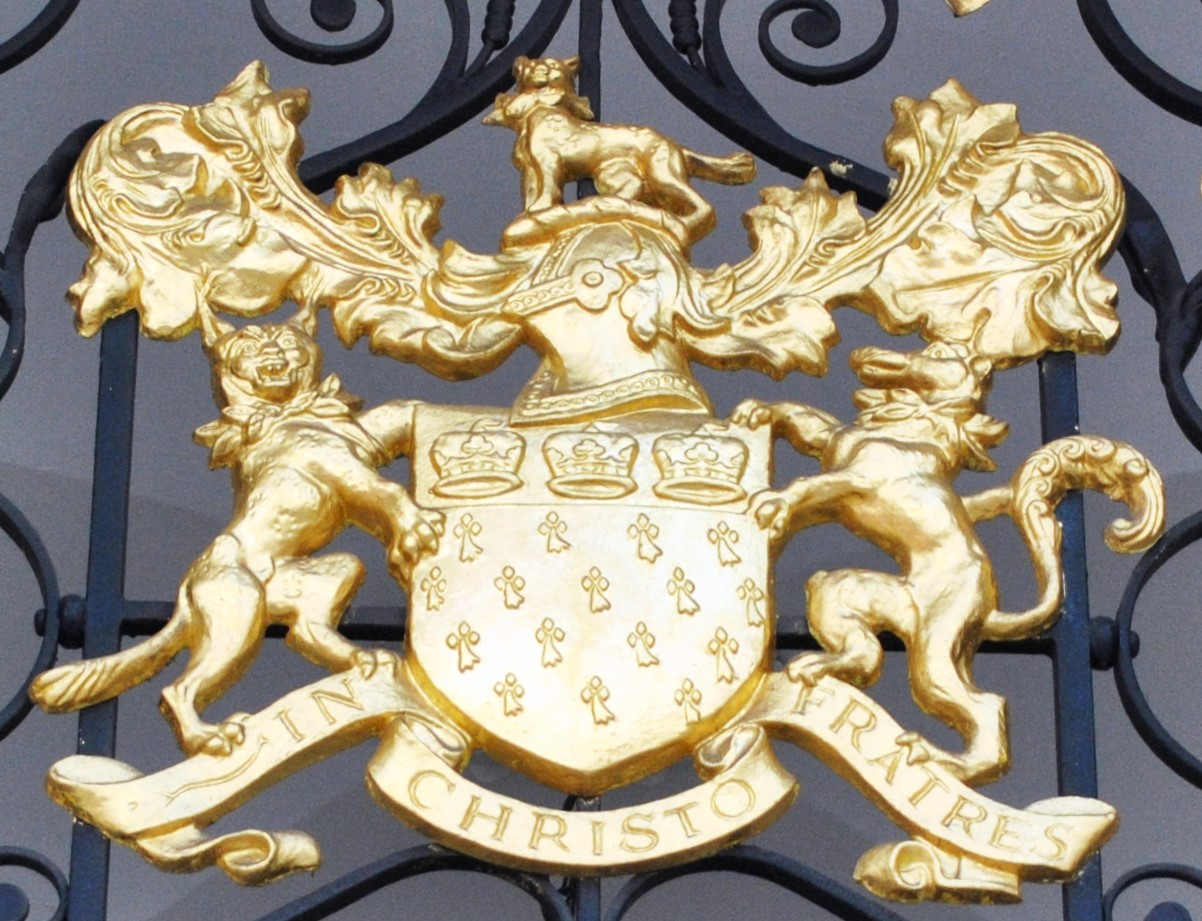
The Skinners' Company: To God Only Be All Glory

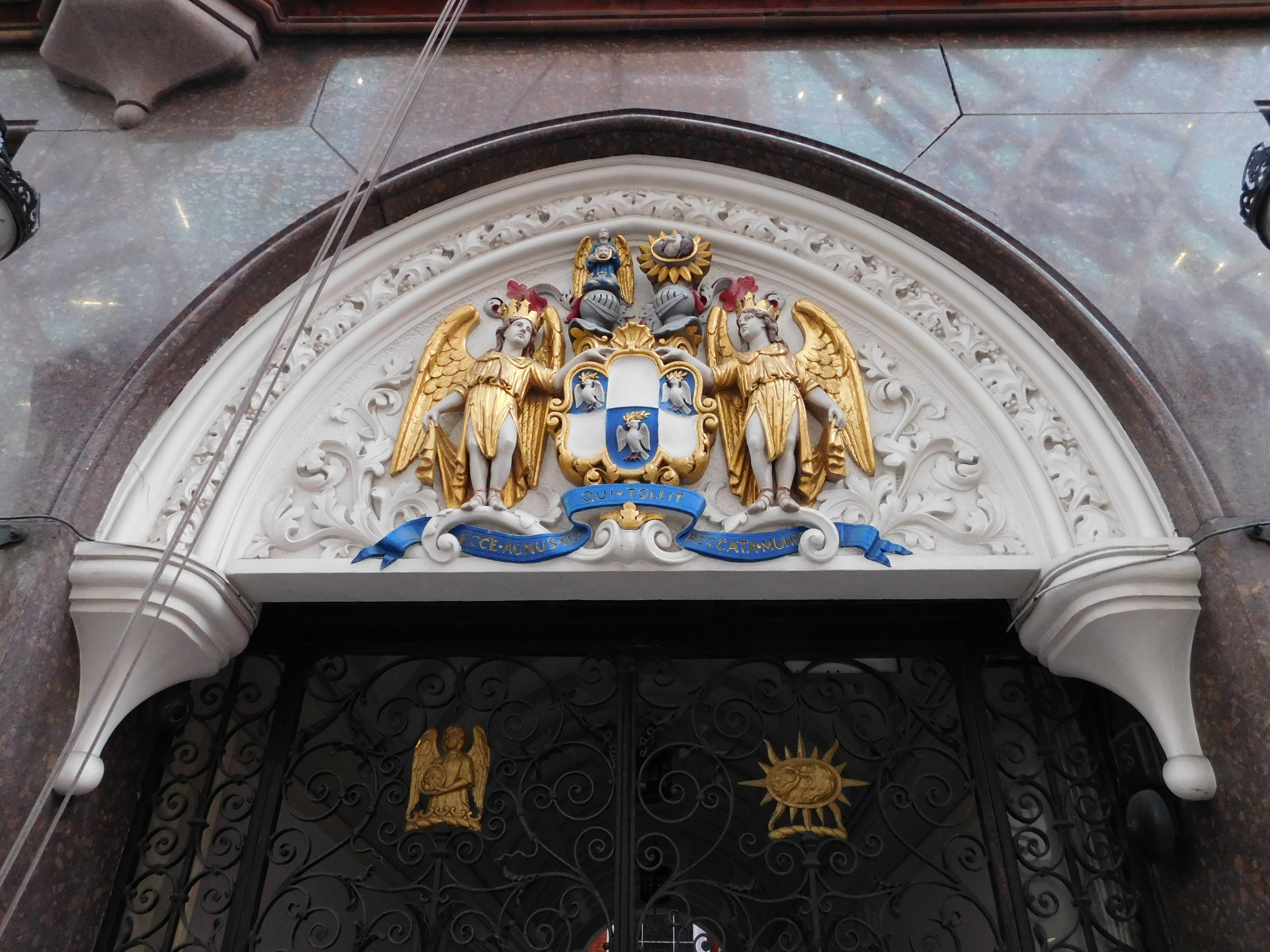
The Tallow Chandlers' Company: Ecce Agnus Dei, Ecce Qui Tollit Peccata Mundi (Behold the Lamb of God, Who Takes Away the Sins of the World)

== See also ==
- List of guilds in the United Kingdom
- Mottos and halls of the Livery Companies
- Incorporated Trades of Edinburgh
- Zünfte of Zürich
- Six corps de marchands of Paris
- Cinco Gremios Mayores of Madrid
- Trade unions in the United Kingdom
