= Worshipful Company of Tin Plate Workers =

Livery company of the City of London

Arms of the Worshipful Company of Tin Plate Workers.

The Worshipful Company of Tin Plate Workers alias Wire Workers is one of the Livery Companies of the City of London. Tin craftsmen were originally part of the Ironmongers' Company, while the wire workers, who made wire objects such as cages, animal traps and fishhooks, were part of the Girdlers' Company. The two groups combined, and were incorporated by a royal charter in 1670. Now, the use of tin plate and steel wire does not remain work done by craftsmen, instead being performed by machines. Thus, the company is no longer a trade association for craftsmen. Instead, it supports the industry through grants, as it does charities.

The Tin Plate Workers' Company ranks sixty-seventh in the order of precedence for Livery Companies. Its motto is Amore Sitis Uniti, Latin for Be United in Love.
