= Worshipful Company of Lightmongers =

Livery company of the City of London

The Worshipful Company of Lightmongers is one of the Livery Companies of the City of London. The Lightmongers, or sellers of electric lights, were organised into the Guild of Lightmongers in 1967. The Guild became a Livery Company in 1984. The Company promotes the lighting industry by awarding prizes and scholarships. Also, it is an institution that supports general charities.

The Lightmongers' Company ranks ninety-sixth in the order of precedence for Livery Companies. Its motto is Dominus Illuminatio Mea Et Salus Mea, Latin for The Lord Is My Light And My Salvation, and its Church is St Botolph's-without-Aldgate.
