= Worshipful Company of Needlemakers =

Livery company of the City of London

Needlemakers' arms

The Worshipful Company of Needlemakers is one of the livery companies of the City of London, ranking sixty-fifth in order of precedence,

The Needlemakers' Company was granted Letters Patent by Oliver Cromwell in 1656, later receiving its Royal Charter in 1664.

The Company gradually lost its role as a trade association after the Industrial Revolution. Like many City livery companies, the Needlemakers' Company now acts as a charitable institution, supporting the needle industry.

The Needlemakers' motto is They Sewed Fig Leaves Together and Made Themselves Aprons.
