= Worshipful Company of Nurses =

Livery Company in the City of London

The Worshipful Company of Nurses is a livery company in the City of London.

It was founded as the Guild of Nurses and was approved for formation as a guild by the Court of Aldermen of the City of London on 9 February 2016. It was formed to represent the nursing profession. A guild is the beginning of a process towards forming a livery company.

In 2020 the Guild became a company without livery, and in May 2023, the Worshipful Company of Nurses was granted Livery by the Court of Aldermen.

On 2 July 2025, the Worshipful Company of Nurses was presented with Letters Patent by the Lord Mayor of the City of London.

The Company ranks 111th in the order of precedence for Livery Companies.

== Aims ==
Its primary aims are benevolence, education, and philanthropy for nurses past, present and future.

The company has a charitable arm- the Company of Nurses Charitable Trust, which gives help and support for nurses at times of financial hardship, and through educational grants.

The Company provides a forum through meetings and events to bring together members from all parts of the nursing world to enjoy fellowship, support, networking and learning.

== Membership ==
Membership of the Company, as prescribed by the Court of Aldermen of the City of London, shall not exceed 250 Liverymen. The number of Freemen is unlimited.

Members of the Company are, or have previously been, on the Register of the Nursing and Midwifery Council (or an equivalent regulatory body).

Students can join as an Apprentice if studying for a nursing degree that will lead to registration. Membership is open to all irrespective of age, sex, race, disability, religion or belief, sexual orientation, or gender affirmation.

== Administration ==
The Company is administered by the Court of Assistants, comprising the Master, who acts as Chairman supported by the Upper Warden, Middle Warden, Renter Warden, and the Court Assistants. The Master holds office for one year and is normally succeeded by the Upper Warden. The Clerk to the Company has responsibility for day-to-day administration of the Company and acts as secretary to the Court. Standing Committees made up of Court Assistants, Liverymen and Freemen address specific matters relating to Company activities and make recommendations to the Court.

== Charitable activity ==
The Company of Nurses Charitable Trust exists to promote the nursing profession for nurses past, present, and future. The Trust is able to offer support for nurses at times of financial hardship, and also contributes to the professional development of nurses through the award of scholarships, bursaries and prizes. The aim is to support nurses so they can contribute to raising standards of nursing care, encourage health and wellbeing, and ultimately, support the lives of those in their care. This is achieved through

- Bursaries and grants aimed at helping nurses develop their skills and knowledge.
- Prizes and awards that recognise excellence and innovation

== Military affiliation ==
Livery Companies have long supported the Armed Forces and most Companies continue to support one or more regular, reserve or cadet forces units. Some Companies have an obvious connection based upon shared professional interests, while others may be based on historical context.

The Worshipful Company of Nurses is affiliated to the Central Reserve Headquarters Army Medical Services (CRHQ).

== See also ==
- Nursing in the United Kingdom
- History of nursing in the United Kingdom
