= Worshipful Company of Environmental Cleaners =

Livery company of the City of London

The Worshipful Company of Environmental Cleaners is one of the livery companies of the City of London. It was established in 1972 as the Guild of Cleaners, and was later known as the Guild of Master Cleaners. The guild became a livery company in 1986, changing its name again, this time to the Environmental Cleaners. The company promotes environmental cleanliness through charitable contributions. The company was granted its royal charter in 2010.

The company ranks ninety-seventh in the order of precedence for livery companies, its motto is Tergere Est Servare, Latin for To Clean Is To Preserve, and its church is St Olaves, Hart Street
