= Worshipful Company of Communicators =

Livery company in the City of London

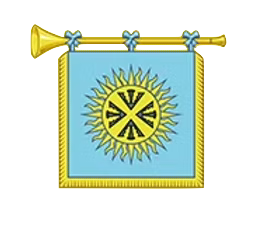
- Coat of Arms of the Worshipful Company of Communicators
- Motto: Inform, Influence, Inspire
- Location: London, United Kingdom
- Date of formation: 2000
- Company association: Communications industry
- Order of precedence: 113th
- Master of company: Jason Groves
- Website: companyofcommunicators.com

The Worshipful Company of Communicators is a livery company for the communications profession in the City of London.

The Company was formed in 2000 as the Guild of Public Relations Practitioners to represent the public relations profession and for charitable purposes. It was granted company without livery status in 2013. On 4 March 2025 it became the 113th Livery Company as the Worshipful Company of Communicators.

== Arms ==
Coat of arms of Worshipful Company of Communicators

Notes
Granted by the College of Arms on 9 February 2026.
Crest
A cock crowing wings elevated and addorsed Erminois combed beaked wattled and legged Gules supporting with the dexter foot a pheon Or.
Torse
Or and Azure.
Escutcheon
Azure three suns linked by three chains orlewise over all a chevron Ermine.
Supporters
On either side a greyhound Argent reguardant blowing a trumpet supported by the exterior forepaw Or.
Badge
On a sun Or four pheons points meeting at the centre Sable.

== See also ==
- Chartered Institute of Public Relations
