= Worshipful Company of Cooks =

Livery company of the City of London

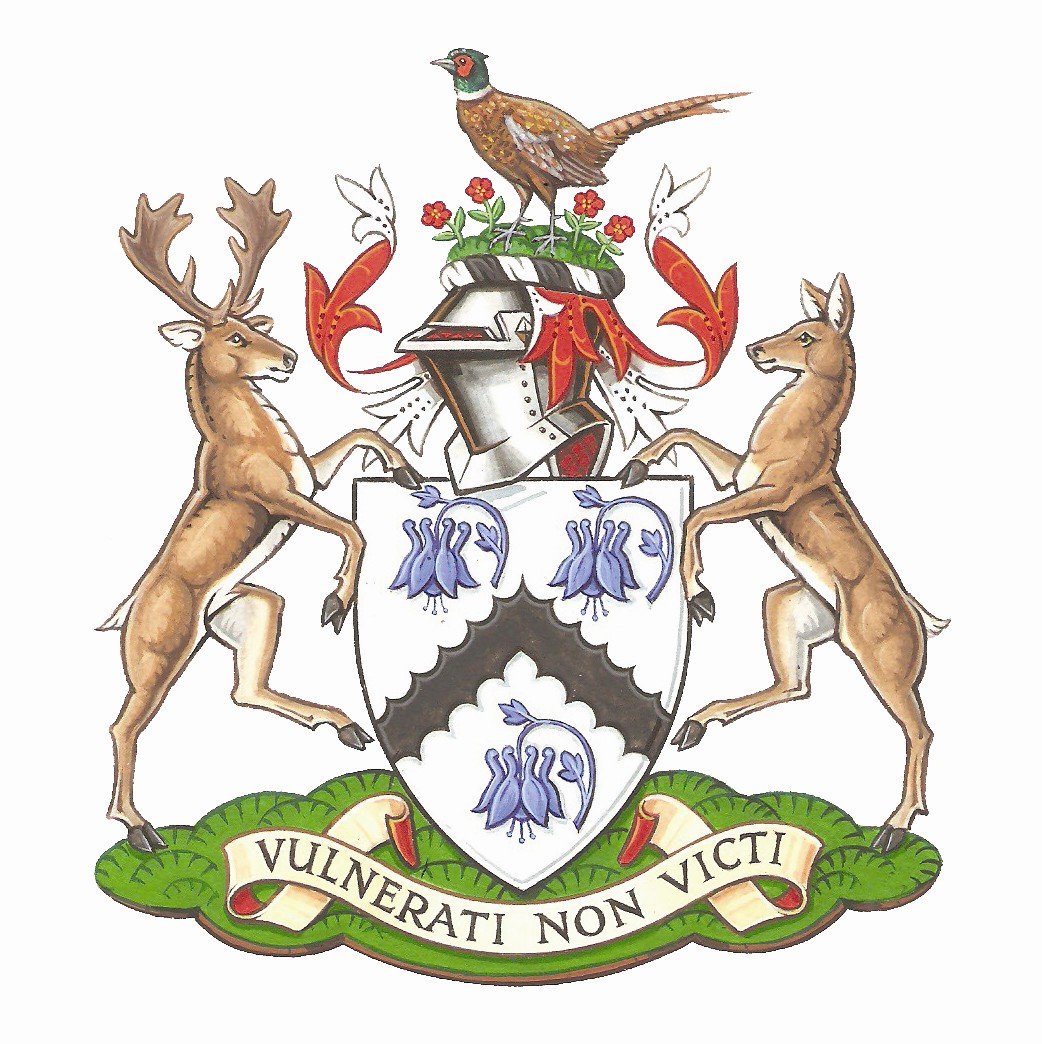
- Motto: Vulnerati Non Victi
- Date of formation: 1482
- Company association: Cooks and food
- Order of precedence: 35
- Website: www.cooks.org.uk

The Worshipful Company of Cooks of London is the smallest of the Livery Companies of the City of London. The Company received its first and incorporating Royal Charter from Edward IV on 11 July 1482. Its Royal Charter of 16 February 1663, from Charles II, is the present day governing ordinance for the Company.

== History ==
The company's origins can be traced back to 1170, when it was founded from two guilds of cooks in medieval London − the Cooks of Eastcheap and the Cooks of Bread Street. The company's history runs from the earliest records of Cooks in the Middle Ages and their control of the craft until the 19th century to the Company's current charitable works. Unusually for the male-dominated livery companies, the Cooks had freemaiden members in 1495.

== Activities ==
The Cooks Company is no longer an association of tradesmen in its original sense of control, yet its membership today still includes craft tradesmen, and its activities engage with a broad range of organisations associated with cooking. The Company's purpose in contemporary times has come to rest in a public search for the common good, to contribute as effectively as it can to the pursuit of a good society − to be socially useful. It does this through four principal objectives that translate its origins, history, traditions, affiliations, and activities into meaningful outcomes for today's world:

- To fund a range of charitable activities associated with the welfare and education of the catering trade
- To support the modern day craft of cooking including catering excellence through competition, scholarly and scientific culinary research, and the development of food policy
- To support the City of London
- To pursue a fellowship of association that can mobilise the necessary resource, skill, and wisdom to bring these about

The Cooks' Company ranks thirty-fifth in the order of precedence of Livery Companies. Its motto is Vulnerati Non Victi, Latin for Wounded not Conquered.
