= Worshipful Company of Fuellers =

Livery company of the City of London

The Worshipful Company of Fuellers is one of the livery companies of the City of London. It is now associated with the whole energy sector, but has its roots in coal: the fuellers, or coal traders, were originally members of the Woodmongers' Company, which became defunct in the eighteenth century. The company was incorporated separately in 1981, and was granted livery status in 1984, and a royal charter in 2009. It is a charitable institution and many of the members (though not all) are drawn from the energy industry. As such, membership is not limited to energy sector employees, but also to those whose interests can make a contribution on energy matters.

The company's activities include a social programme (livery dinners, etc), as well as regular industrial visits and talks.

The Fuellers' Company ranks ninety-fifth in the order of precedence of livery companies. It has made submissions to the government's energy policy review, details of which can be found on its website.
