= Worshipful Company of Hackney Carriage Drivers =

Livery company of the City of London

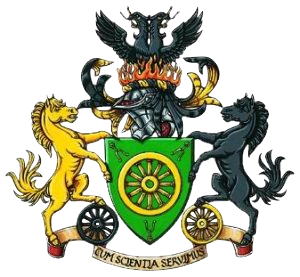
- Coat of Arms of the Worshipful Company of Hackney Carriage Drivers
- Motto: Cum Scientia Servimus
- Location: London, United Kingdom
- Date of formation: 1990 (Fellowship); February 2004 (Livery Company)
- Company association: Hackney carriage (taxicab) trade
- Order of precedence: 104th
- Master of company: Dan Heath
- Website: thewchcd.co.uk

The Worshipful Company of Hackney Carriage Drivers is one of the 113 livery companies of the City of London. Its members are professional hackney carriage drivers, including London black taxicab drivers who have learnt the knowledge of London.

The Fellowship of Hackney Carriage Drivers was recognised by the City of London Corporation in 1990 and was granted livery in February 2004, becoming the Worshipful Company. The process started with an instruction from Oliver Cromwell to the city's Court of Aldermen in 1654 on regulating drivers. Legislation created the Fellowship of Master Hackney Coachmen, the first such society for taxi drivers.

The company's charity supports any deserving members and their immediate family. It has run an annual taxi tour to Disneyland Paris for children with life-threatening illnesses each year since 1994. Its education programme, The Cab Guide Course, teaches taxi drivers about the history of London in order to proceed to conduct London tours, and it seeks to promote public awareness about the high standards of the hackney carriage trade. The company also takes part in the annual Lord Mayor's Show.

The Hackney Carriage Drivers' Company ranks 104th in the order of precedence of City Livery Companies.
