= City of London Solicitors' Company =

Livery company of the City of London

The City of London Solicitors' Company is one of the 114 livery companies of the City of London. The company was formed in 1908; the City granted it Livery status in 1944. The company received a royal charter in 1958. Prior to 1969, when the City of London Law Society was formed, the company functioned as a law society for the city's solicitors and after that it mainly functioned as a charitable body. The company is not to be confused with the London Solicitors UK legal firm.

== See also ==
- Worshipful Company of Scriveners (notaries)
