= Alastair King (businessman) =

British financier (born 1968)

Alderman Sir Alastair King KStJ DL
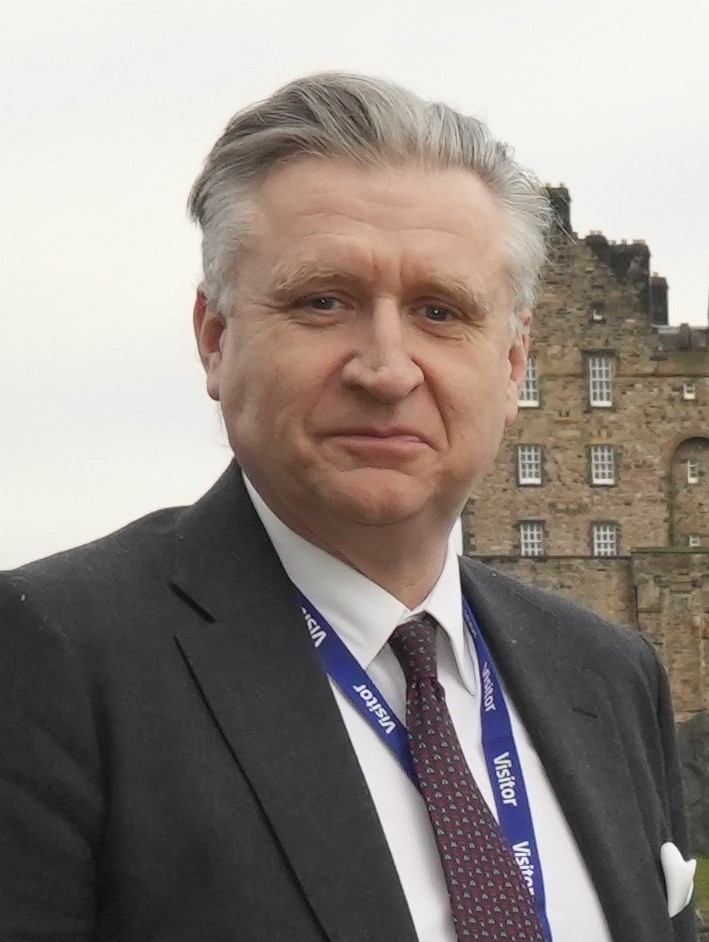
- Alastair King in 2023

Lord-Lieutenant of Greater London
- Incumbent
- Assumed office 14 October 2026
- Monarch: Charles III
- Preceded by: Sir Ken Olisa

696th Lord Mayor of London
- In office 8 November 2024 – 7 November 2025
- Preceded by: Michael Mainelli
- Succeeded by: Dame Susan Langley

Sheriff of London
- In office 28 September 2022 – 27 September 2023
- Preceded by: Sir Nicholas Lyons
- Succeeded by: Dame Susan Langley

Personal details
- Born: Alastair John Naisbitt King; 5 November 1968 (age 57) Cambridge, England
- Spouse: Florence Walker (m. 2024)
- Parents: Jack Naisbitt King MBE (father); Ruth née Lewis (mother)
- Relatives: Alexander Armstrong, Giles Coren (brothers-in-law)
- Education: Oundle School
- Alma mater: University of Kent (BA); London Business School (MSc)
- Profession: Financier; Asset manager
- Awards: KStJ
- Website: www.naisbittking.com

Sir Alastair John Naisbitt King KStJ DL (born 6 November 1968) is a British financier and asset manager, chairman of Naisbitt King Asset Management Ltd, who has been the Lord-Lieutenant of Greater London since October 2026. He previously served as the 696th Lord Mayor of London for 2024/25.

== Background and education ==
Born in 1968 at Cambridge to an academic father, Jack Naisbitt King MBE (eldest son of John King by his wife Grace, daughter of James Naisbitt), and artist mother, Ruth née Lewis, he celebrates his Scottish ancestry.

After attending Oundle School, King read law at the University of Kent (BA) before pursuing further studies in Finance at London Business School (MSc).

== Career ==
Qualifying as a solicitor in 1995, King practiced with Baker McKenzie in the City and in Asia, where he started investing in emerging markets. Appointed a senior executive at Spark Ventures (formerly NewMedia Spark plc), then managing director of Galahad Capital plc, he was CEO of Eredene Capital plc from 2005 to 2013 and Chairman of Glendevon King Asset Management from 2005 to 2016. In 2016 he founded FCA-regulated Naisbitt King Asset Management Limited, specialising in managing segregated portfolios of investment grade fixed income securities.

He was knighted in the King's Birthday Honours 2026 for services to pension reform and international business.

== Public life ==
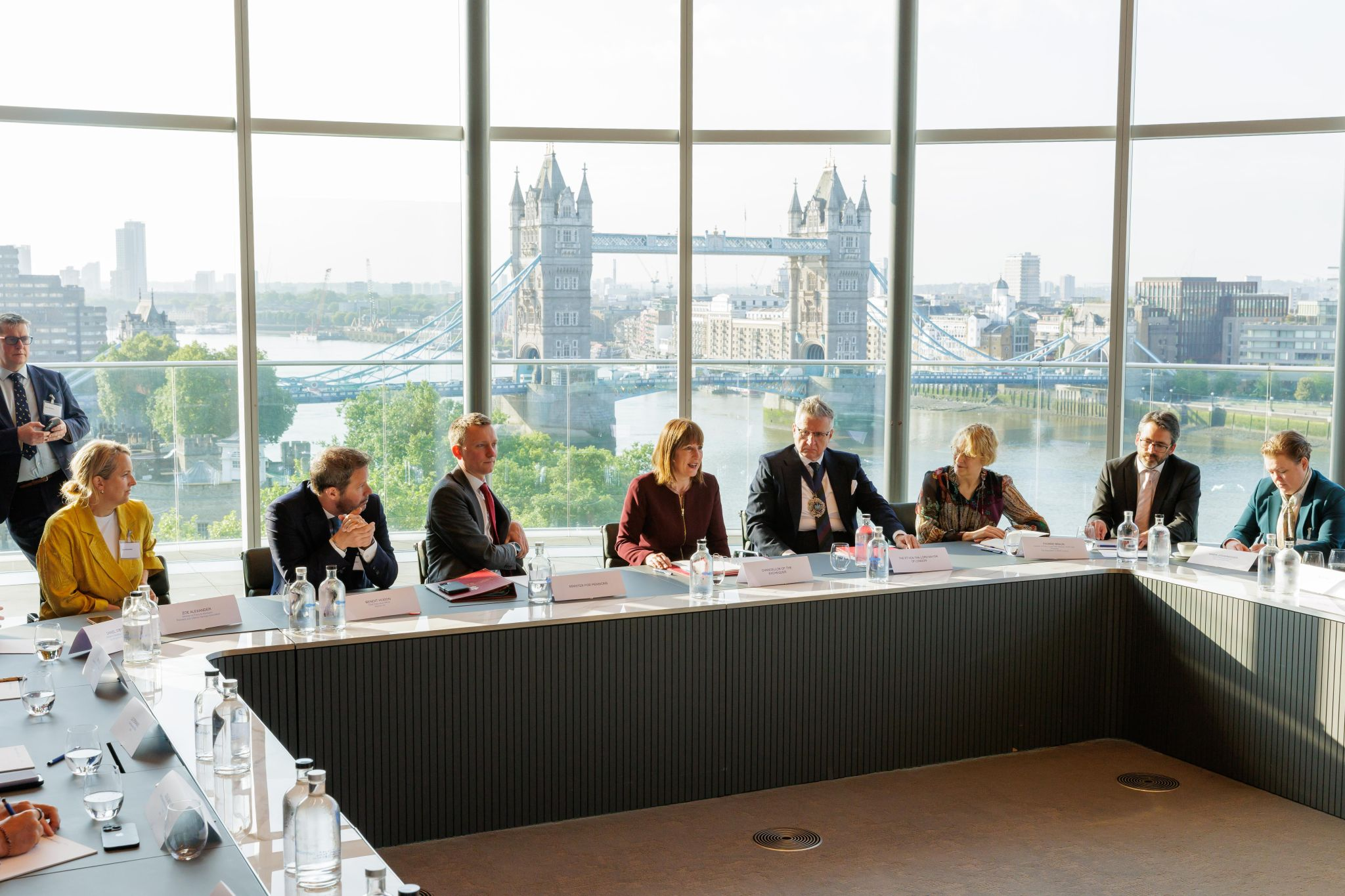
Alastair King and the Chancellor of the Exchequer discuss the Mansion House Accord

=== Civic service ===
Elected in 1999 as a Common Councillor for the Ward of Queenhithe, in 2006 he was promoted Deputy and since 2016 King serves as the Ward's City Alderman. Sheriff of the City of London for 2022/23, he was elected as the 696th Lord Mayor of London taking office on 8 November 2024 for a one-year term.

Lord Mayor King hosted the Amir of Qatar at the Mansion House then being invited to visit Qatar as UK financial services ambassador. As Lord Mayor, King also hosted the President of France, Emmanuel Macron, at Guildhall in July 2025.

Sir Alastair was appointed as His Majesty's Lord-Lieutenant of Greater London with effect from 14 October 2026.

=== Charity ===
King previously served as Vice-Chairman of Breast Cancer Haven, and is currently the Chairman of the British Liver Trust, King is also a Trustee of the Lord Mayor's Appeal and of Morden College.

As Lord Mayor, he was ex officio Chairman of the City Reserve Forces' and Cadets' Associations.

Past Master of the Worshipful Company of Masons, King has served as Current Master of the Worshipful Company of Entrepreneurs and Prime Warden of the Worshipful Company of Blacksmiths. He is also a Liveryman of the Vintners’, Painter-Stainers’, Broderers’, Feltmakers’ and Arbitrators’ Companies, an Honorary Liveryman of the Security Professionals' Company, Honorary President of the Guild of Young Freemen and an Honorary Assistant of the Coachmakers’ Company.

== Honours and appointments ==
- Knight of Justice of the Order of St John (2025)
  - MStJ (2022)
- Deputy Lieutenant for Greater London (2022)
- Alderman of the City of London (2016)
- Sheriff of the City of London (2022/23)
  - Prime Warden of the Worshipful Company of Blacksmiths (2021/22)
  - Freeman of the City of London.

== Personal life ==
King is married to Florence Walker, youngest daughter of Angus Walker, previously Chairman of Hampstead Garden Suburb Trust.. Lady King serves as a reservist in the British Army Reserve. Her sister is the journalist and author Esther Walker.

== See also ==
- City of London Corporation

Honorary titles
Preceded by Sir Ken Olisa	Lord-Lieutenant of Greater London; 2026–present	Incumbent
Civic offices
Preceded by Professor; Michael Mainelli	Lord Mayor of London; 2024 – 2025	Succeeded by Dame Susan Langley
