= Worshipful Company of Blacksmiths =

Livery company of the City of London

Coordinates: 51.51165°N 0.09483°W

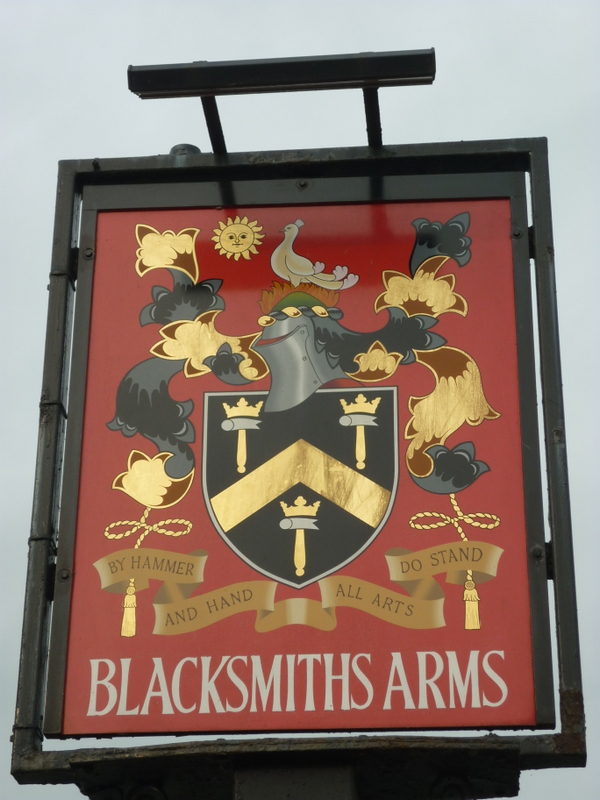
The Blacksmiths' Arms pub, Bishop Auckland, Co. Durham

The Worshipful Company of Blacksmiths ranks fortieth among the ancient livery companies of the City of London.

First mentioned in a Court record of 1299, London's blacksmiths evolved from a religious fraternity into a guild before being granted the status of a Company by Royal Charter in 1571.

The Blacksmiths' Company originally determined trade regulations and standards from the City, but their rights gradually diminished as London expanded outwards. By the end of the eighteenth century, little remained of its former powers and so the Company did not the renew the lease of Blacksmiths' Hall which expired in 1785.

== Background ==
Trustees continued to administer the Blacksmiths' funds. From 1828 there was a renewed energy on the social aspects of the Company. After 1890 there was a renewed connection with the craft of blacksmithing, and by 1934 this extended throughout Great Britain rather than just the City of London and its environs.

Many of its Livery members (both male and female) continue to be practising blacksmiths.

The Court of the Worshipful Company of Blacksmiths, on the advice of its Craft Committee, awards a range of Certificates, Diplomas and Medals: these recognise various degrees of ability and quality of workmanship achievable by training and experience of Blacksmiths working as individuals and when working as a team. The awards range from a Certificate of Competence and a Journeyman's Certificate for apprentices starting out on their careers to a Gold Medal for consistent work of very high quality in prestigious commissions given to blacksmiths who have long experience in the craft.

The Company provides judges and prizes at County Shows throughout the UK, and maintains a charitable trust making donations, principally in support of apprentice blacksmiths.

Ranking fortieth in the order of precedence of City Livery Companies, its motto is By Hammer and Hand All Arts Do Stand.

Lord Mayor-elect Alastair King served as Prime Warden Blacksmith for 2021/22.

== Arms ==
Coat of arms of Worshipful Company of Blacksmiths
Crest On a wreath of the Colours, a Phoenix in flames rising Proper. Escutcheon Sable, a Chevron Or between three Hammers Argent handled and crowned with open Crowns of the Second. Motto By Hammer and Hand All Arts Do Stand.
