= Peter Hewitt (businessman) =

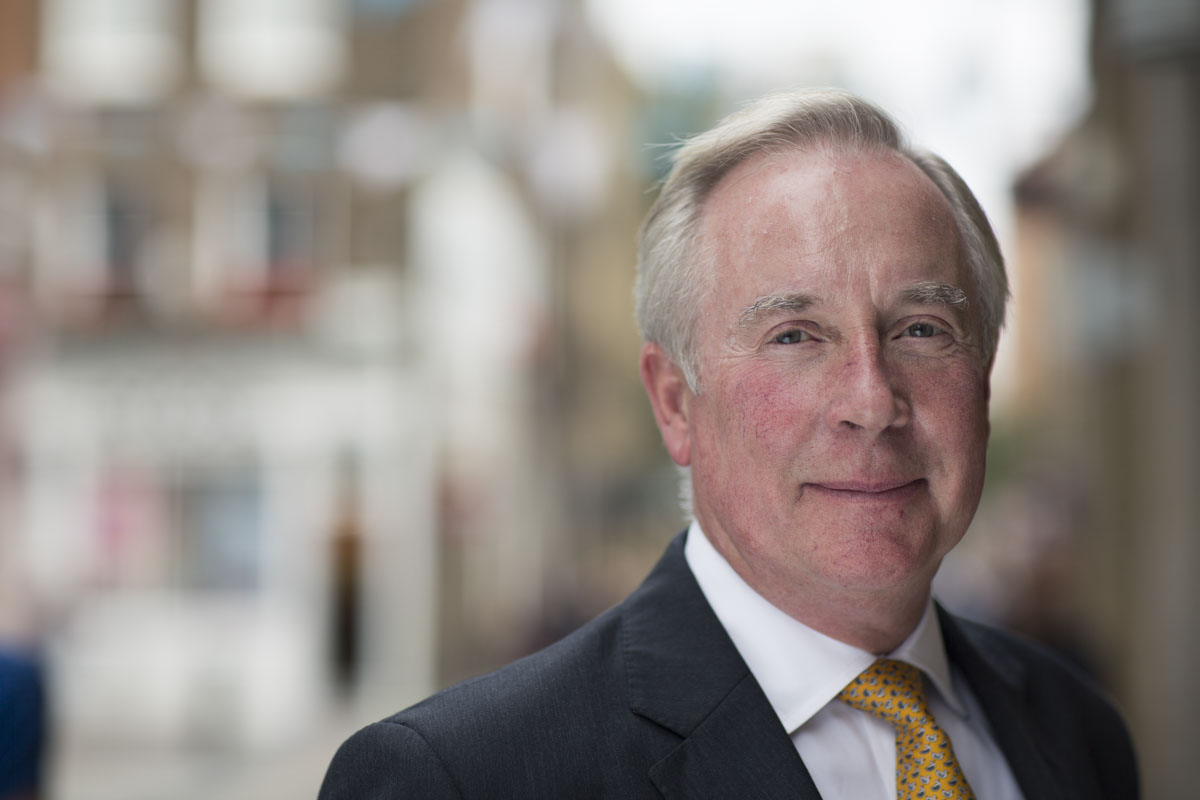
- 2014
- Born: 24 March 1953 (age 72)
- Spouse: Fidelma

Peter Lionel Raleigh Hewitt (born 24 March 1953) is an English business and civic figure. He is co-founder and co-chair of Universal Defence and Security Solutions (UDSS) and chairman of Blackfinch Spring VCT plc.

== Early life ==
Hewitt was born in Yorkshire at Catterick Military Hospital. Educated at Wellington College, where he was awarded a flying scholarship from the RAF at the age of 16, gaining his private pilot's licence a few months after his 17th birthday. At Wellington, he took part in gymnastics and athletics (pole vault), representing the school at various levels.

== Career ==
Hewitt has held board and chair roles in a number of UK companies, including listed and investment vehicles. Blackfinch Spring VCT plc’s annual report identifies him as its non-executive chairman and describes his background in public-company governance and public service.

Companies House filings record Hewitt as a director of Scampton Holdings Limited (appointed 27 November 2021). Companies House also records him as a director of Bishopsgate Capital Limited (appointed 23 May 2006; resigned 21 June 2007).

In 1991, he set up Peter Hewitt Associates, a corporate finance and residential property consultancy, that helped raise funds under the Business Expansion Scheme. During this period he achieved a solution on behalf of Close Brothers for the residential development of land in Cambridgeshire via a PFI type scheme to the USAFE. He also undertook a number of consultancy roles, for amongst others: SRI Capital Advisers: the DeBondo Energy Group; Classic Security Limited; Award International PLC and Cornhill Asset Management.

In 1998 Hewitt undertook an MBI of a nearly insolvent PLC which was ultimately named the Wigmore Group PLC. He grew the company and floated it on AIM in 2002. The company undertook a number of acquisitions and Hewitt exited from the group in 2004.

Hewitt has also been a non-executive director of the Close Brothers Capital Trading Companies – which grew from £10m to £150m funds under management, during his 13-year tenure. He then retrained as a corporate financier and founded two private client stockbroking businesses, exiting from the last of these in 2008, selling the company to an overseas buyer.

Hewitt is the founder and chairman of finance for Companies Limited, an SME risk capital broker (FCA Appointed Representative), together with Premier Non Executives Ltd, which is a specialist non-executive recruitment company working in tandem with Finance for Companies. He is a director of Provident & Regional Estates Limited, a company specialising in origination and brokering of alternative financial products in Timberlands. He is a member of the British Bankers Association Business Finance Taskforce (part of Project Merlin).

Hewitt is a director of Blackfinch Spring VCT plc and Scampton Holdings Limited.

== Public service ==
Hewitt served as an Alderman for the Ward of Aldgate in the City of London (2012–2018). His published register of interests lists a range of committee memberships and civic roles during that period.

== Military and judicial roles ==
Blackfinch Spring VCT plc’s annual report describes Hewitt as an Honorary Group Captain in No. 601 (County of London) Squadron, Royal Auxiliary Air Force, and as a Justice of the Peace (on the supplemental list).

== Defence sector ==
UDSS identifies Hewitt as a co-founder and co-chair of the firm (established with General Sir Richard Barrons).

== Politics ==
He was a part of the London policy unit for Ireland's Fine Gael party prior to their election in 2011.

== Livery companies and other roles ==
Hewitt has held office within City of London livery organisations. The Worshipful Company of Woolmen lists him as Master for 2016–2017. The City of London Corporation’s register of interests for him includes livery-related roles and trusteeships during his time as Alderman. Companies House records him as a director of The Company of Entrepreneurs Trustee Ltd (appointed 24 November 2016; resigned 18 February 2021).

Hewitt serves or has served on a number of City of London committees, including Community and Children's Services; The Finance Committee; the City Bridge Trust; the Court of Aldermen's Privileges committee and General Purposes committee as well as the Court of Common Council. He is a governor of the City of London Freemen's School, trustee of Emanuel Hospital Charitable Trust and an ex officio member of the Court of the Honourable Artillery Company. He is chairman of the City of London's new £20m Social Investment Fund.

Hewitt is the patron of the Aldgate Ward Club and an appeal patron of Sea-Change Sailing Trust. Hewitt is a Justice of the Peace.

== Personal life ==
City of London declarations of interest list his spouse as Fidelma Mary Hewitt.

He married Fidelma in 1989 and they have 4 children.

He has had a lifelong interest in flying, particularly older aircraft. He is a Past Master of the Worshipful Company of Woolmen; a Founding Freeman and Past Master of the Guild of Entrepreneurs; a member of the General Committee of the City of London Club; Past Commodore of the Old Wellingtonian Sailing Association; a member of the Lloyd's of London Yacht Club.
