= Bronek Masojada =

British businessman

Alderman Bronek Masojada

698th Lord Mayor of London
- Incumbent
- Assumed office 16 November 2026
- Preceded by: Dame Susan Langley

Sheriff of London
- In office 28 September 2023 – 27 September 2024
- Preceded by: Andrew Marsden
- Succeeded by: David Chalk

Personal details
- Born: Bronislaw Edmund Masojada; 31 December 1961 (age 64) Durban, Natal, South Africa
- Spouse: Jane Lamont (m. 1986)
- Education: UKZN (BSc); Trinity College, Oxford (MPhil)
- Profession: Insurer
- Website: www.hiscoxgroup.com

Alderman Bronek Masojada (born Bronislaw Edmund Masojada, 31 December 1961), is a British businessman and insurer, CEO of Hiscox from 2000 to 2021.

Masojada was elected Alderman for Billingsgate Ward in 2019, and served as a Sheriff of London for 2023/24.and was elected the 698th Lord Mayor of London for 2026/2027.

== Early life and education ==
Masojada is of Polish descent and was raised in the Catholic faith. He is the elder son of Milek Masojada (1929–2015), an engineer, and Shirley née Johnston. His great aunt was Felicja Masojada (1898–1943).

He was educated at Durban High School before reading Civil Engineering at the University of KwaZulu-Natal, where he graduated BSc. He then pursued Management Studies as a Rhodes Scholar at Trinity College, Oxford, receiving the postgraduate degree of MPhil.

Masojada completed national service as a lieutenant in the South African Army (1983–84).

== Career ==
Masojada worked for McKinsey & Company from 1989 to 1993. He then joined Hiscox in 1993 as Managing Director, became Chief Executive in 2000 and stepped down in 2021. Masojada was a Deputy Chairman of Lloyd's of London from 2001 to 2007, and Chairman of the Lloyd's Tercentenary Research Foundation from 2008 to 2014.

Masojada was appointed Chairman of SiriusPoint Ltd (from June 2023), and a Director of Brown & Brown (from January 2023). He also serves as the Chair of the East End Community Foundation (from November 2021) and of Saltus, a wealth manager (from March 2024). He served on the board of Pool Re from June 2015 to December 2021 and of the Assocation of British Insurers from July 2012 to December 2021. He is a Past President of the Insurance Institute of London, and served as Chairman of Lloyd's Underwriting Agents Association. He was Chair of Policy Placement Limited, the industry-owned company driving digitisation of the London insurance market, from March 2018 to July 2023.

== Public service ==
Masojada was elected alderman for the ward of Billingsgate in 2019. He served as one of the two Sheriffs of London for 2023/2024,

=== Charitable service ===
Since 2021, Masojada has been the Chair of Trustees for East End Community Foundation (EECF), the grant-making charity serving Hackney, Newham, Tower Hamlets and the City of London. Interviewed by Wharf Life in 2022, Masojada said EECF was "a clear solution to a clear problem" for tackling poverty and improving lives in East London. He is a member of the Fundraising Board of the Lord Mayor's Appeal and served as Master of the Worshipful Company of Insurers for 2013/14.

== Honours and appointments ==
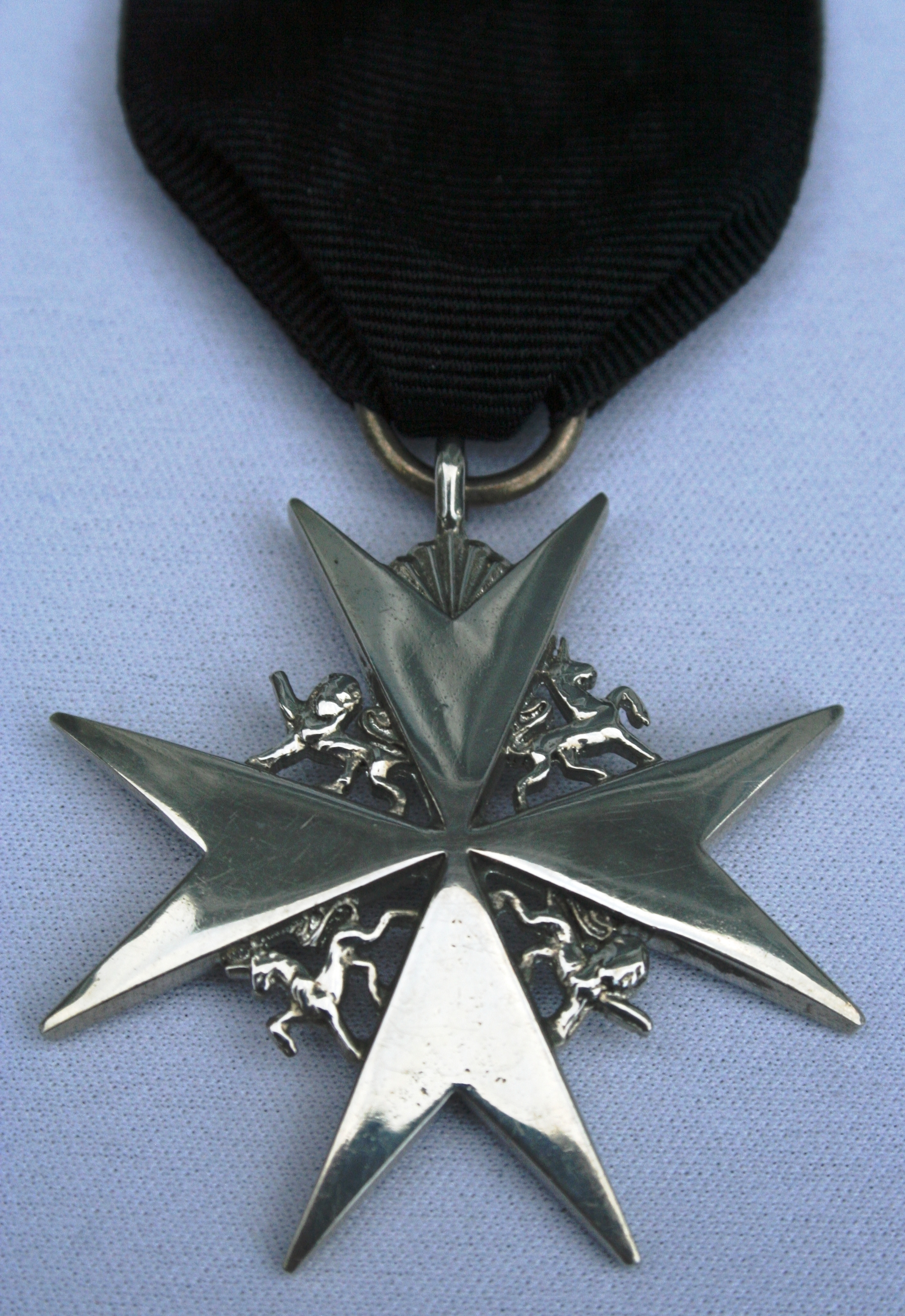
MStJ insignia

=== Honours ===
- : Member of the Order of St John (2023)

=== Civic appointments ===
- Alderman of London (2019)
- Sheriff of the City of London (2023/24)
  - Liveryman of the Worshipful Company of Insurers (Master, 2013/14)
  - Craft Owning Freeman of the Company of Watermen and Lightermen of the River Thames
  - Liveryman of the Worshipful Company of Distillers
  - Freeman of the City of London.

== Family ==
In 1986 Masojada married Jane Lamont, a figurative and portrait artist. They have five children: Adam (m. 2019 Rosanna Carson, granddaughter of James Bruce), Michaela, Lara, Dominik and Marek, and live on the North Downs.

== See also ==
- List of Rhodes Scholars
