= Felicja Masojada =

Polish Righteous Among the Nations (1898–1943)

- Born: May 18, 1898; Kołomyja, Galicia, Austria-Hungary
- Died: June 15, 1943 (aged 45); Kisorycze, Reichskommissariat Ukraine
- Cause of death: Murdered under torture

Felicja Masojada (born Kołomyja, Austria-Hungary, 18 May 1898; died Kisorycze, Poland, 15 June 1943) was a Polish resistance member during World War II, posthumously recognised by Yad Vashem as Righteous Among the Nations.

== Life ==
She was born in 1898, in a Polish family at Kołomyja (then part of Kingdom of Galicia and Lodomeria under the Austrian Partition of Poland, later in Kresy Wschodnie), she was the eldest daughter of Michał Masojada (1862–1940) and Maria Karolina née Osiniak (1875–1940).

Predeceased by her husband Wiktor Gallert (1897–1930), she resumed her maiden name. Devoutly Catholic, Felicja Masojada became a teacher and, well respected in the local community, was promoted in 1937 headmistress of the primary school in Okopy, Volhynia.

Following the Russian invasion of Poland in WWII, Masojada and the local priest, Fr. Ludwik Wrodarczyk, sheltered Jewish refugees, nursing the infirm. Instrumental in arranging medical supplies with Soviet partisans, Masojada continued risking their collection in person, even during the Volhynia massacre.

On 15 June 1943, Ukrainian nationalists ambushed her coach returning from Rokitno on the forest road at Kisorycze. Masojada, accompanied by her maid Elżbieta Jeż and coachman Kasper Koziński, were brutally murdered (save the coachman's Ukrainian wife, whom the UPA spared).

== Family and legacy ==
Nominated by one of those she rescued, Alexander Lewin, the Yad Vashem Institute posthumously honoured Felicja Masojada with the title of Righteous Among the Nations.

On 3 August 2000, Colonel Edmund Masojada, was presented with her insignia by Israeli ambassador Shevah Weiss.

Her nephew, Milek Masojada FSAICE (1929–2015), emigrated to South Africa, having five children, including an elder son, Alderman Bronek Masojada, Sheriff of London (2023/2024) and 698th Lord Mayor of London (2026/2027).

== See also ==
- Polish Righteous Among the Nations
