= Robert Hughes-Penney =

Councilmen and Aldermen of the City of London

Alderman Robert Hughes-Penney

Alderman for the City Ward of Cheap
- Incumbent
- Assumed office 5 July 2018
- Preceded by: Lord Mountevans
- Succeeded by: in office

Sheriff of the City of London
- Incumbent
- Assumed office 26 September 2025
- Preceded by: Gregory Jones
- Succeeded by: in office

Personal details
- Born: Robert Charles Hughes-Penney; 2 March 1968 (age 58) Rio de Janeiro, Brazil
- Spouse: Elspeth Joanna Hoare (m. 1998)
- Children: 3
- Education: Haberdashers' Aske's School, Elstree
- Occupation: Investment banker

Robert Charles Hughes-Penney FCSI (born 2 March 1968), is a British financier who serves as an Alderman since 2018 and Sheriff of the City of London for 2025/26.

== Biography ==
Educated at Haberdashers' Aske's School Elstree before going to Manchester Polytechnic (BSc 1989), Hughes-Penney then went to RMA Sandhurst and was commissioned in the British Army in 1990. As a subaltern he served overseas with the 13th/18th Royal Hussars then Light Dragoons (after amalgamation), being promoted Captain in 1993.

After military service, Hughes-Penney joined City stockbrokers Laurence Keen 1993–95, becoming a director of Rathbone Investment Management 2003–06 and a director of Investing for Good 2016–20. Elected a Fellow of the Chartered Institute for Securities & Investment (FCSI), since 2020 he serves on its board since 2021.

Hughes-Penney represents the Ward of Cheap as Alderman on the City of London Corporation since 2018, previously being elected to the Court of Common Council 2004–12.

A Court Assistant of the Haberdashers' Company since 2008 (then Warden), Hughes-Penney was also a Governor of Haberdashers’ Aske's School for Girls Elstree (2009–16), Master of the Guild of Investment Managers for 2019/20. Appointed to the Council of the City and Guilds of London Institute in 2006–10 (Hon. Member since 2010), he has served as a Trustee of Mercy Ships UK 1999–2004, the City Parochial Foundation 2004–10, on the Court of the Clergy Support Trust 2021–24 and as a Trustee of Morden College since 2024.

He is also a member of the Cavalry & Guards Club, the City Livery Club and the HAC.

== Family ==
The son of Roger Hughes-Penney, of The Chase, Henham, Essex and Angela née Lee, in 1998 he married Elspeth, a solicitor and daughter of Dr David Gurney Hoare.

Hughes-Penney and his wife live at Gerrards Cross in Buckinghamshire, and have two sons and a daughter.

== See also ==
- Worshipful Company of Haberdashers

Civic offices
Preceded by Alderman; Gregory Jones KC	Sheriff of the City of London; 2025–2026	Incumbent
