= Borove, Sarny Raion, Rivne Oblast =

Borove
- Village
- Location of Borove within Ukraine
- Coordinates: 51°07′N 27°18′E
- Country: Ukraine
- Oblast: Rivne Oblast
- Raion: Sarny Raion
- Hromada: Rokytne settlement hromada

Borove (Ukrainian: Борове), formerly Budki Borovskiye (Russian: Будки Боровские; Polish: Borowskie Budki, Budki Borowskie) is a village in Rivne Oblast, Ukraine.

Between the world wars, the village was part of the Second Polish Republic. It was located in Gmina Kisorycze, Sarny County, in Wołyń Voivodeship; until the 1939 Soviet invasion of Poland.

During the wave of massacres of Poles in Volhynia between 1942 and 1945 the village was one of hundreds of sites of mass killings by the UPA death squads aided by the local Ukrainians. On December 6–7, 1943, the Polish inhabitants of Budki were slaughtered, numbering at around fifty. Those who survived, hidden in the forest, were later threatened with death by their Ukrainian neighbours and left the area. The war history of the village was written about by Kazimierz Garbowski (January 1928 in Budki Borowskie – 2000, Warsaw), author of a memoir collected between 1990-1998.
