= Alastair King =

Alastair King may refer to:

- Alastair King (composer) (born 1967), British composer and conducter
- Alastair King (businessman) (born 1968), British financier and asset manager, chairman and 696th Lord Mayor of London
