= Roger Gifford =

British banker (1955–2021)

Alderman Sir Roger Gifford KStJ KNO
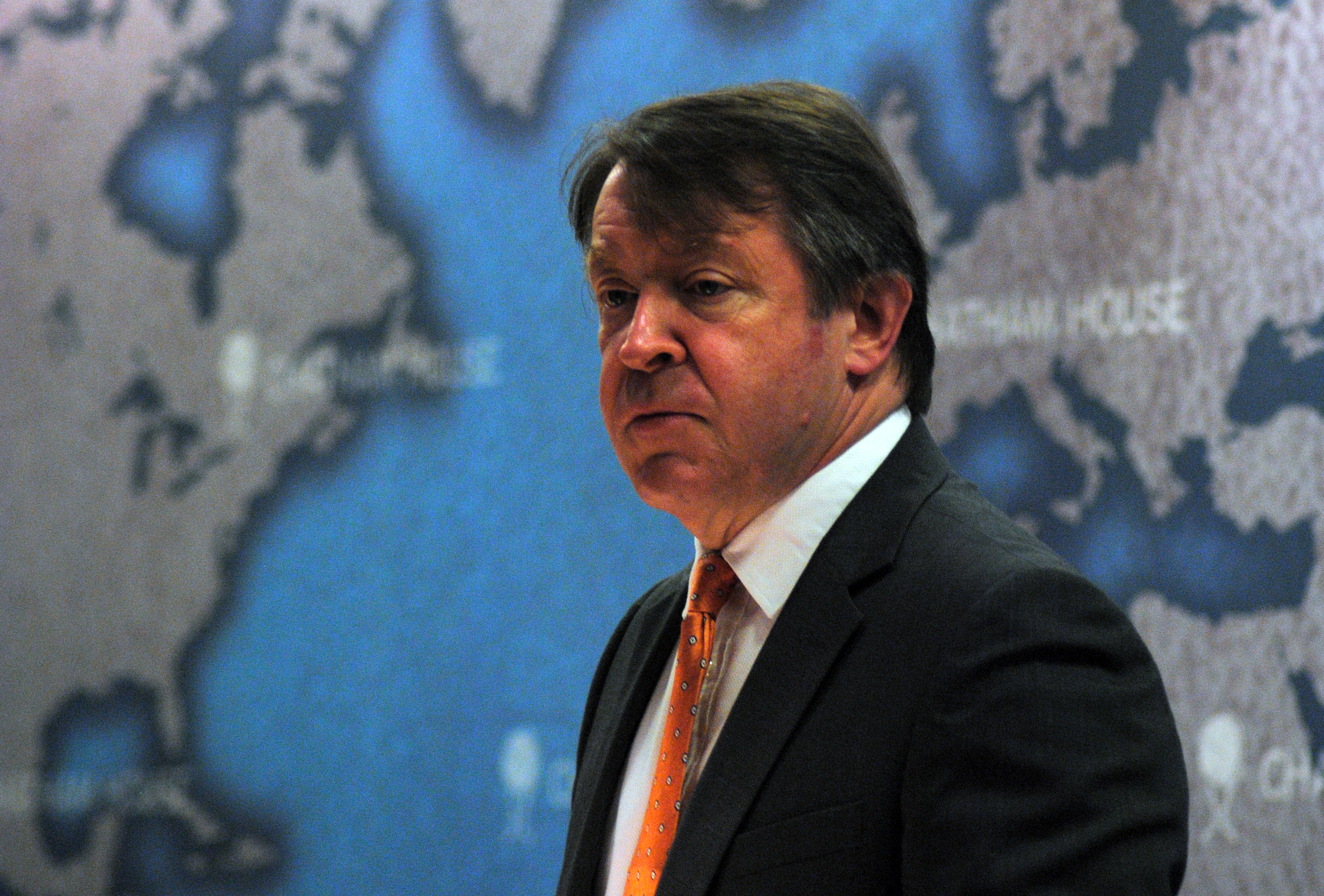
- Portrait of Gifford at Chatham House in 2013

685th Lord Mayor of London
- In office 9 November 2012 – 8 November 2013
- Preceded by: Sir David Wootton
- Succeeded by: Dame Fiona Woolf

Personal details
- Born: Michael Roger Gifford; 3 August 1955 St Andrews, Fife, Scotland
- Died: 25 May 2021 (aged 65)
- Spouse(s): Jane Lunzer (1983–2004); Clare Taylor, Lady Gifford
- Children: 5
- Education: Trinity College, Oxford
- Occupation: Merchant banker

Sir Michael Roger Gifford KStJ KNO (3 August 1955 – 25 May 2021) was a British banker in London who served as the 685th Lord Mayor of London from 2012 to 2013.

Gifford was the UK head of Skandinaviska Enskilda Banken (SEB) from 2000 and was also a Patron of the financial and enterprise education charity "MyBnk".

== Early life ==
Gifford was born in St Andrews, Scotland to Douglas Gifford (of Argentinian and Lowland Scots descent) and Hazel Collingwood. He was educated at Sedbergh School before going up to Trinity College, Oxford, graduating with an MA degree in Chemistry.

== Career ==
Gifford started his career in finance with SG Warburg (1978–82), working in international banking and capital markets. In 1982, he left to join a new merchant bank, Enskilda Securities, Skandinaviska Enskilda Bank and, from 1994 to 2000, he headed the bank's operations in Japan. From 2000 to 2017 he was SEB's UK country manager and was a Senior Banker. He was also Chair of the UK Green Finance Institute having led the Green Finance Initiative (2016) and the UK Government's Green Finance Taskforce (2017).

A former chairman of the Swedish Chamber of Commerce (UK) and of the Association of Foreign Banks (UK), he was a Chair of St Paul's Cathedral Council, Founding Chair of the City Music Foundation, the English Chamber Orchestra charity and the Tenebrae Choir, among other Arts involvements.

He was a liveryman of the Worshipful Companies of Musicians, Master (2016-2017), Cordwainers and Security Professionals, the Worshipful Company of International Bankers, Master (2010–11) and was sponsoring Alderman for the Guild of Public Relations Practitioners.

Sir Roger joined the Bank Workers Charity Trustee Board in 2011 and, following his term as Lord Mayor of London, was appointed its President on 1 March 2014. He believed there is a continuing need to support banking industry employees and to enhance the ethics and culture of the sector.

=== Civic service ===
Gifford was elected as Alderman for the City of London Ward of Cordwainer in 2004 and was a member of the City of London Corporation Culture Heritage and Libraries Committee; he served as Sheriff of London from 2008 to 2009.

In October 2012, he was elected Lord Mayor of London and took office on 9 November. Speaking after his election, Gifford said: "Next month will mark exactly 30 years since I joined SEB and 35 years since I first started working in the City. During this time, London's Square Mile has become a truly global centre – and the focus of my year in office will be to underline that service is, and must be, at the heart of the financial services industry of the UK. In other words that the City must serve society – and be seen to do so."

While Lord Mayor, he carried the Mourning Sword at the funeral of Margaret Thatcher, leading the Queen and Prince Philip in and out of St Paul's Cathedral for the ceremony. The last time it had been used was at the state funeral of Sir Winston Churchill in 1965.

Gifford's Lord Mayoral charitable appeal, under the banner "The City in Society", focused on the City of London as a global centre for philanthropy and the Arts.

== Personal life ==
Gifford and his wife, Dr Clare Taylor, Lady Gifford, lived in London.

A Freemason, Sir Roger listed his recreations as chamber music, singing, opera, gardening, and forestry.

Gifford died from complications of myeloma in 2021, aged 65.

== Honours ==
In 2013, as Chancellor ex officio, Gifford received an Hon DSc from City University and was knighted in the 2014 New Year Honours for "services to international business, culture, and the City of London". He was awarded an Hon LLD by St Andrews University in the same year.

- 2014: Knight Bachelor
- 2013: Knight of the Most Venerable Order of St John
- 2007: Commander of the Order of the Polar Star (Sweden)
- 2011: Commander of the Order of the Lion of Finland
- 2012: Member 5th Class of the Order of Kuwait.

Civic offices
Preceded by Sir David Wootton	Lord Mayor of London; 2012–2013	Succeeded by Dame Fiona Woolf
