= Susan Langley =

British businesswoman (born 1963)

Dame Susan Langley DBE DStJ
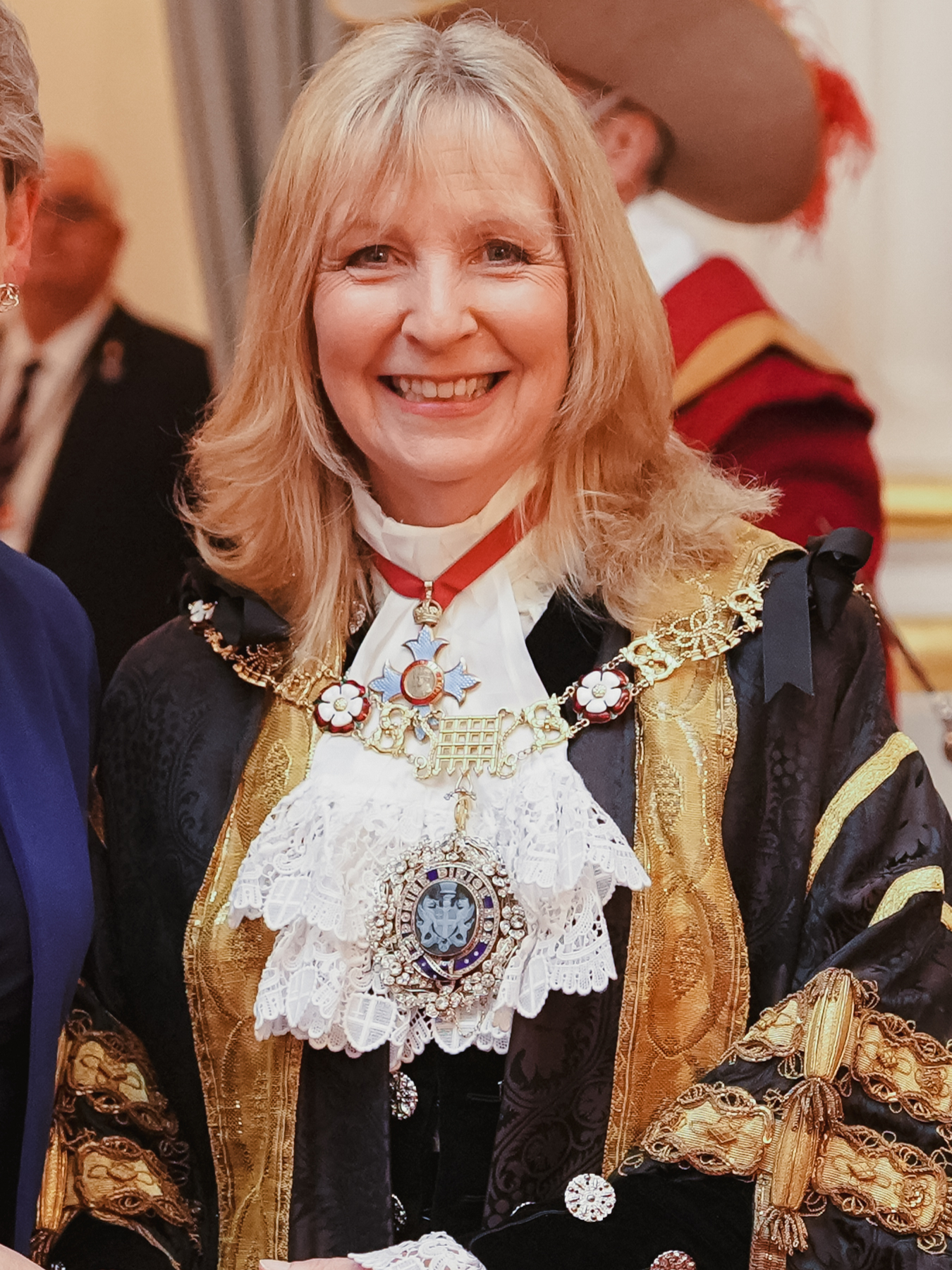
- Langley in 2026

697th Lady Mayor of London
- In office 7 November 2025 – 15 November 2026
- Preceded by: Alastair John Naisbitt King

Alderwoman of the City of London
- Incumbent
- Assumed office 12 July 2018
- Preceded by: Peter Hewitt

Sheriff of the City of London
- In office 28 September 2023 – 27 September 2024
- Preceded by: Alastair King
- Succeeded by: Gregory Jones

Personal details
- Born: Susan Carol Walford; 2 July 1963 (age 63) West Ham, Essex, England
- Spouse: Gary Phillip Langley JP (m. 2003)
- Education: University of Southampton
- Profession: Insurer

Dame Susan Carol Langley (née Walford; born 2 July 1963) is a British businesswoman who served as Lady Mayor of London for 2025–26. An alderwoman since 2018, Langley was the third female Lord Mayor (and the first to be styled Lady Mayor) and previously served as a Sheriff of the City of London for the 2023–24 term.

An insurer and financier, Langley is the non-executive chair of Gallagher UK since 2015 and a non-executive director of UK Asset Resolution.

== Early life and education ==
Susan Walford was born in 1963 at West Ham, then in Essex, the daughter of Shirley née Manners and James Walford. She was educated at Redden Court School before studying Geography at the University of Southampton, graduating BSc.

== Career ==
Having travelled in Australia after university, she joined Thomson Tour Operators as a programme manager and held various roles from 1987 to 1996, and then PricewaterhouseCoopers as a principal consultant working with a range of FTSE companies (1996–98), before becoming Chief Operating Officer of Hiscox. With Lloyd's of London from 2007 until 2012, Langley served as Director for North America and Market Development, Director of Lloyd's Asia and Chair of Lloyd's Japan, before joining the Department for Business and Trade as Chief Executive Officer for Financial and Professional Services from 2013 to 2015.

A Senior Independent Director for UKAR (Northern Rock Asset Management and Bradford & Bingley) since 2010, Langley chairs Gallagher UK since 2015, and served as Lead NED at HMG Home Office (2014–22).

Elected to represent Aldgate Ward on the Court of Aldermen since 2018, Langley served as Sheriff of the City of London for 2023–24.

=== 2025: Lady Mayor of London ===
Langley is the Lady Mayor of London for the 2025–26 term, Langley is the third woman (Note: After Dame Mary Donaldson (for 1983/84) and Dame Fiona Woolf (for 2013/14).) to hold the office since its establishment in the 13th century and the first styled as Lady Mayor of London.

== Personal life ==
In 2003 she married Gary Langley, a Justice of the Peace for Hertfordshire.

=== Charitable service ===
Langley served as a Trustee of Macmillan Cancer Support from 2017 to 2021, as well as a Trustee of Mansion House Scholarship Scheme (MHSS) from 2022–23.

Langley is also a Trustee of the Lord Mayor's Appeal, and a Member of the Lord Mayor's Appeal Advisory Board, and is a Liveryman of the Drapers’ Company, overseeing the Gift & Legacy Fund.

Langley also regularly speaks at events and mentors a number of individuals.

== Honours and appointments ==
=== National honours ===
- : Dame Commander of the Order of the British Empire (2023)
  - Officer of the Order of the British Empire (2015), for "services to women in business"
- : Dame of the Order of St John (2026)
  - Member of the Order of St John (2024)

=== Civic appointments ===
- Alderwoman of London (2018)
- Sheriff of the City of London (2023–24)
  - Liveryman of the Worshipful Company of Insurers
  - Liveryman of the Worshipful Company of Drapers
  - Freeman of the Worshipful Company of Goldsmiths
  - Freeman of the City of London
- Lady Mayor of London (2025–present)

Supportive of Equality of Arms in heraldry, Dame Susan has not petitioned the Earl Marshal for a grant of Arms until such time as positive change for sex equality in the laws of Arms, heraldic convention and practice is decreed by Garter and his fellow Kings of Arms, instead assuming a personal armorial design.

== See also ==
- City of London
- Lloyd's of London

Civic offices
Preceded by Alastair King	Lady Mayor of London; 2025–2026	Incumbent
