= Crystal Sceptre =

Part of the Lord Mayor of London's regalia

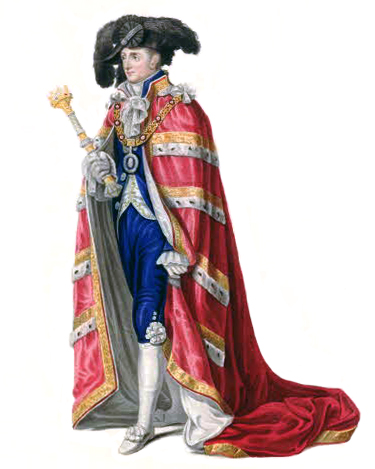
Lord Mayor of London with the Crystal Sceptre, 1821

The Crystal Sceptre (occasionally described as a mace) is part of the regalia of the Lord Mayor of London. It was presented to the City of London by King Henry V in return for having provided the king with 10,000 marks (£6,666) to fund a war in France in 1415, when his army captured Harfleur and then won the Battle of Agincourt.

== Description ==
The sceptre measures 17 inches (43 cm) long, with a rock crystal shaft incised with helical grooves, in two parts, mounted with gold and pearls. At the top is a gold crown with alternating fleur-de-lys and cross embellishments, mounted with jewels including Afghan red spinel, Ceylon blue sapphires, and pearls from the Persian Gulf. Within the circlet of the crown is a painting on parchment of the Royal Arms of England adopted in 1406, quartering three fleurs-de-lys for France with three lions for England. The crown may have been adapted from a religious sculpture of the Virgin Mary. The other end has a large rock crystal boss.

== History ==
The sceptre was probably assembled in London, c.1380–1420, though the rock crystal was probably carved in Paris and presented to the City of London between 1415 and 1421 – it was mentioned as being carried by the Lord Mayor at the coronation of Queen Katherine in 1421. Few medieval gold objects survive to the modern day, but it was hidden during the turmoil of the Commonwealth and kept safe by the Lord Mayor Sir Thomas Bloodworth during the Great Fire of London in 1666. The central boss of crystal was damaged and replaced with a glass replica by the jewellers Rundell, Bridge & Rundell in the 1830s.

The sceptre is kept in the Guildhall, and usually only seen in public at the annual installation of the new Lord Mayor and at the coronation of a monarch. It is one of the symbolic items – sceptre, sword, purse, seal – that are touched during the annual Silent Ceremony to install a new Lord Mayor each November, but remains in its protective box throughout.

The sceptre went on public display for the first time in 2015, at the Guildhall Art Gallery.
