= R. H. A. Swain =

British virologist (1910–1981)

Richard Henry Austin Swain (6 February 1910 – 11 May 1981) was a British virologist, bacteriologist and pathologist.

== Life ==
He was born in Wimbledon on 6 February 1910, the son of master builder, Charles Henry Swain. He was educated at Cheltonian College and Dulwich College, going on to study medicine at the University of Cambridge.

In 1939 he began as a demonstrator in pathology at St Bartholomew's Hospital, London. In 1942 he joined the Royal Army Medical Corps and served as a military pathologist with the Central Mediterranean Forces. He was demobbed in 1946. In 1949 he joined the University of Edinburgh as lecturer then reader in pathology and virology. In 1949 he was elected a Fellow of the Royal Society of Edinburgh. His proposers were Thomas J. Mackie, James Pickering Kendall, Alexander Murray Drennan and John Gaddum. In 1951 he was elected a member of the Harveian Society of Edinburgh.

He died in Edinburgh on 11 May 1981.

== Family ==
He married Margaret Helen Hart. They were parents to Catherine Fiona Swain.

== Publications ==
- Clinical Virology (1967)
- Medical Microbiology (joint author)
