= Gregory Jones (barrister) =

British lawyer and barrister

Alderman Gregory Jones KC

Alderman of London
- Incumbent
- Assumed office 8 February 2017
- Preceded by: Julian Malins KC

Sheriff of the City of London
- In office 27 September 2024 – 26 September 2025
- Preceded by: Dame Susan Langley
- Succeeded by: Robert Hughes-Penney

Personal details
- Born: Gregory Percy Jones; 1968 (age 57–58) Kent, England
- Spouse: Rosali Pretorius (m. 1997)
- Children: 2
- Profession: Barrister

Gregory Percy Jones KC is a British lawyer, who serves as an Alderman of London since 2017 and was Sheriff for 2024/25.

== Background and education ==
Of ancient patrilineal Welsh and matrilineal Irish extraction, (Jones & McDonald). Jones attended Pelham Road Infants and Primary Schools in Bexleyheath and after passing the 11-plus, Jones was educated at Colfe's School (Exhibitioner). Winning a Leathersellers' Scholarship and a Barclay's Bank Scholarship he then went up to New College, Oxford, where he read jurisprudence (graduating MA). Playing for New College 1st XV at rugby, he also served as President of the Oxford Law Society in 1987 and Treasurer of the Oxford Union in 1988. Jones took a year out of education before pursuing further studies in law at the Inns of Court School of Law (BVC) and University College London (LLM).

== Career ==
Jones was selected to tour the US in 1989 as part of the British National Debate Team organized by the English Speaking Union. He was a stagiaire at the European Commission in 1990. He took his Bar finals at the Inns of Court School of Law while a resident at the London House for Overseas Graduates (now called Goodenough College). Jones was called to the Bar at Lincoln's Inn in 1991, taking silk in 2011. A Lincoln's Inn Hardwicke Scholar and Thomas More Bursar, he was also the first Jean Pierre Warner Scholar to the European Court of Justice (1995). Jones is a practicing barrister at the independent bar, a member of Francis Taylor Building at the Temple, London, and an associate tenant at KBW Chambers in Leeds. Described in 2017 by Chambers & Partners as "the thinking man's QC" and as "not just the meat-and-two-veg planning silk, he can deal very comfortably with European issues and complexity across the board".

A sometime Fellow of the Centre of European Law at King's College London, Gregory is Chancellor of the diocese of Manchester and Deputy Chancellor of the diocese of Truro. He is also the Vicar General of the Province of York. Jones was a member of the governing council of St Stephen's House, Oxford (2011–20) and is now a Distinguished Visiting Fellow . He has also been elected FRSA (2013), FRGS (2014) and FLS (2015). he is also a Legal Associate of the Royal Town Planning Institute

A Bencher of Lincoln's Inn since 2019 Jones was also elected a Bencher of the Inner Temple in 2020 where is joint deputy master of the silver.

Jones served as a Common Councilman for the Ward of Farringdon Without from 21 March 2013 until his election as an Alderman of the City of London for the same ward on 8 February 2017. A Liveryman (then Third Warden for 2020/21) of the Worshipful Company of Leathersellers as well as of the Butchers' Founders', Stationers' and Arbitrators' Companies, Jones served as a Sheriff of the City of London (for 2024/25). He is also an Honorary Liveryman of the Worshipful Company of Security Professionals

Jones served for five years as a Governor of Colfe's School and then for seven years as Governor of the Leathersellers' Federation of Schools (three state schools in Lewisham). He is Trustee of the Prendergast Trust and President of the Sir John Staples Society which promotes cultural activities for the Leathersellers' Federation of Schools. In 2018, Jones was also appointed a Law Fellow of Goodenough College.

In 2015, Jones was appointed by the Irish government to chair an independent expert organizational review of An Bord Pleanála, the independent, statutory, quasi-judicial body responsible for strategic infrastructure and various environmental permitting decisions and all appeals to decisions made by local planning authorities in Ireland; the report was published in February 2016 and made 101 recommendations.

== Publications ==
Jones is co-author of several leading legal texts including:

- "The NPPF Handbook" Co-edited Jones and Neat (Hart, 2017);
- "The SEA Directive - A Plan for Success?" co-edited Jones and Scotford (Hart, 2017);
- "The Habitats Directive - A Developer's Obstacle Course?" edited by Jones (Hart, 2012);
- "Statutory Nuisance Law and Practice" (5th. Ed.) by McCracken, Jones and Pereira (Bloomsbury, 2019);
- "Environmental Law in Property Transactions" (4th. Ed.) by Waite, Jones and Fogleman (Bloomsbury, 2016).

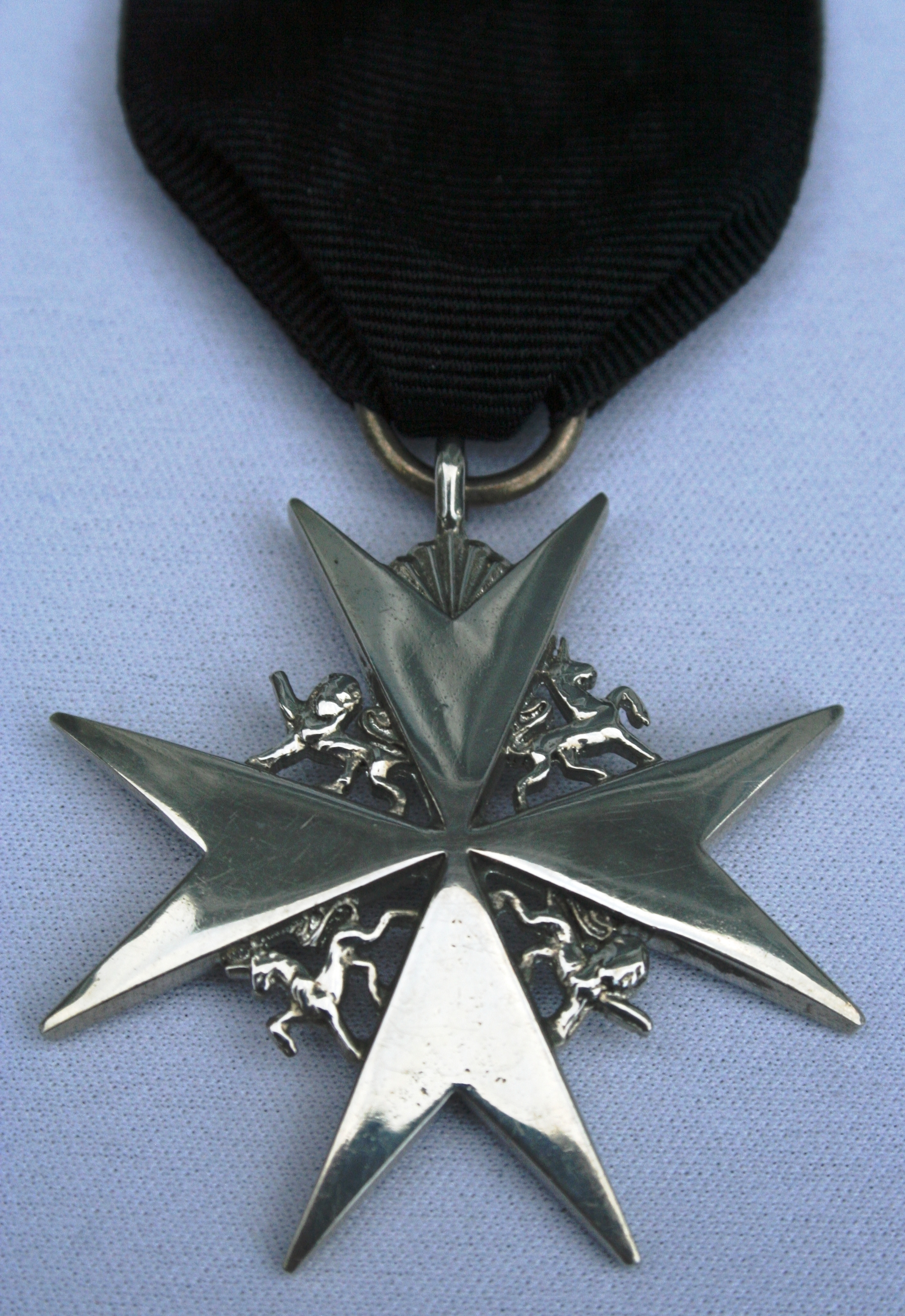
MStJ insignia

== Honours ==
- : Member of the Order of St John (2025)
  - Queen's Counsel now King's Counsel (2011).

== Family ==
In 1997 Jones married Rosali Margaretha Pretorius, by whom they have two children. A qualified music teacher, Town Councillor, School Governor and solicitor, Rosali is a senior partner in the financial markets law practice of Simmons & Simmons. They divide their time between homes in London and Kent.

He is a member of MCC and Surrey CCC and supporter of London Irish Rugby Club.

== See also ==
- Corporation of London
- Farringdon Without

Civic offices
Preceded by Dame; Susan Langley	Sheriff of the City of London; 2024–2025	Succeeded by Alderman; Robert Hughes-Penney
