= Margaret Swain =

English embroidery and textile historian (1909–2002)

Margaret Swain MBE
- Born: Margaret Helen Hart; 13 May 1909; Parbold, Lancashire, England
- Died: 27 July 2002 (aged 93); Edinburgh, Scotland
- Occupations: Embroidery and textile historian
- Years active: 1947–1994
- Spouse: R. H. A. Swain (m. 1937; died 1981)
- Children: 3
- Family: Fiona Woolf (daughter)

Margaret Helen Swain MBE (née Hart; 13 May 1909 – 27 July 2002) was an English embroidery and textile historian. Trained as a nurse in London, she began a career as a historian after noticing no history about Ayrshire whitework embroidery in books following an exhibition at the Signet Library which she visited. Swain's research on the subject resulted in the publication of several books, she held two exhibitions, and wrote about embroidery, household textiles and tapestries in museum journals, magazines and newspapers. She was awarded an honorary Master of Arts degree from the University of Edinburgh in 1981. A pencil portrait of Swain was made by Elizabeth Blackadder and a collection of papers and objects related to her career are stored at National Museums Scotland.

== Early life ==
Swain was born on 13 May 1909, in Parbold, Lancashire, England. She was the oldest of five children of the iron and steel merchant John Swain and his wife, Isabella, née Hart. Both of Swain's parents died by the time she turned 17. She was taught embroidery by her Irish grandmother. In 1929, unable to obtain a university education because of family circumstances, she went to London to train as a nurse at St Bartholomew's Hospital, because it was one of a few professions to offer an instant salary and more education at that time. Swain remembered her time at the hospital from 1930 to 1937 fondly despite the strict discipline from the matron she worked under. She authored Pre-Reformation Nurses in England in 1933, which won her the American Nutting Dock prize, and wrote Some Medieval Nurses in England for Nursing Times in the same year. Swain went to art history lectures by David Talbot Rice at the University of Edinburgh.

== Career ==
In 1947, Swain moved to Scotland as the inaugural Edinburgh International Festival commenced. It was there at an exhibition at the Signet Library that she became aware of Ayrshire whitework embroidery and noticed there was no history about it in books. Swain researched the topic, which was compiled into the 1955 small book, The Flowerers, the story of Ayrshire White Needlework. The book was critically acclaimed and she received encouragement to publish everything she had researched. Swain documented old family bills and papers and brought them to scholarly attention in her work. She wrote A Devotional Miscellany in the mid-1960s, and held two exhibitions called Needlework from Scottish Country Houses and Clothes from Scottish Houses at The Merchants Hall, Edinburgh in 1966 and 1969, respectively. In 1970, her second book, Historical Needlework: A Study of Influences in Scotland and Northern England, was published following travelling across Scotland with Victoria Wemyss.

Swain's third book, The Needlework of Mary Queen of Scots, was published in 1973. She was sought to catalogue the embroideries and tapestries of the Holyrood Palace, Edinburgh by the individuals tasked with upgrading the Palace's displays in the mid-1970s. Swain believed this was an area of collections that had been neglected in previous years. In 1980, her fourth book, Figures on Fabric: Embroidery Design Sources and Their Application, was published. She authored the book "for herself" because it was an area she had a great interest in. This was followed by Swain's fifth book, Ayrshire and Other Whitework, in 1982. In 1986, Scottish Embroidery, Medieval to Modern, was published, followed by a contribution to Upholstery in Britain and America from the 17th Century to World War I the following year. Swain wrote Tapestries and Textiles at the Palace of Holyrood House in 1988 followed by Embroidered Stuart Pictures in 1990 and Embroidered Georgian Pictures in 1994. The final book came after a suggestion from Glasgow School of Art embroider Kathleen Whyte and it brought all of Swain's interests in embroidery.

Outside of embroidery, she worked as a social worker for the disadvantaged and disturbed on a volunteer basis from 1954 to 1974. Swain contributed to a large number of museum journals, magazines and newspapers in the United Kingdom and the United States on embroidery, household textiles and tapestries, such as Antiques, The Connoisseur, Country Life, The Burlington Magazine, Bulletin for the Costume Society of Scotland, Bulletin of the Wadsworth Atheneum, Costume, Conservation of Furnishing Textiles, Embroidery, Furniture History, Journal of the Society of Friends of Dunblane Cathedral, Heritage Scotland, League News of St. Bartholomew's Hospital, Scotland's Magazine, The Scotsman, Scottish Home and Country, Scottish Society for Art History Journal, The Bulletin of the Needle and Bobbin Club, Pillans & Wilson and George Harrison & Co., The Daily Telegraph, The Guardian, The Times, Textile History and Waffen und Kostumkunde. She offered advice to art bodies, country houses and museums such as National Art Collections Fund and National Trust for Scotland and talked to scholars like Edith Standen at Metropolitan Museum of Art, Boston's Nancy Graves Cabot and John Nevison of the Victoria and Albert Museum. Swain lectured and spoke to audiences in the United Kingdom and overseas and regularly attended conferences of the Centre International d'Etude des Textiles Anciens. She was a member of the council of the Embroiderers' Guild since 1944, The Costume Society, and was an associated member of the Weavers' Workshop of Great Britain.

== Personal life ==
Swain was a Presbyterian. In 1981, she was awarded an honorary Master of Arts degree from the University of Edinburgh, and was appointed the MBE for "her work on embroidery" in 1989. Swain married the bacteriologist and physician R. H. A. Swain on 27 November 1932 and he predeceased her in 1981. They had three children, two sons and a daughter, one of whom is Fiona Woolf. She died in Edinburgh on 27 June 2002.

== Personality and legacy ==
According to Naomi Tarrant in obituaries for The Scotsman and Costume, Swain was "an immensely warm and helpful person, always interested in the ploys of younger people". The Scottish National Portrait Gallery said she was the first to notice that Scotland was "unusual in the number of private houses which still contained historic textiles." In 1999, artist Elizabeth Blackadder drew a pencil portrait of Swain and presented it to the former's family a year later. The portrait was donated by the Swain family to the Scottish National Portrait Gallery in celebration of their mother's 90th birthday in 2001. National Museums Scotland holds a collection related to Swain. They include her personal papers and objects related to her career.
