= Fiona Woolf =

686th Lord Mayor of London

Dame Fiona Woolf DBE DStJ DL
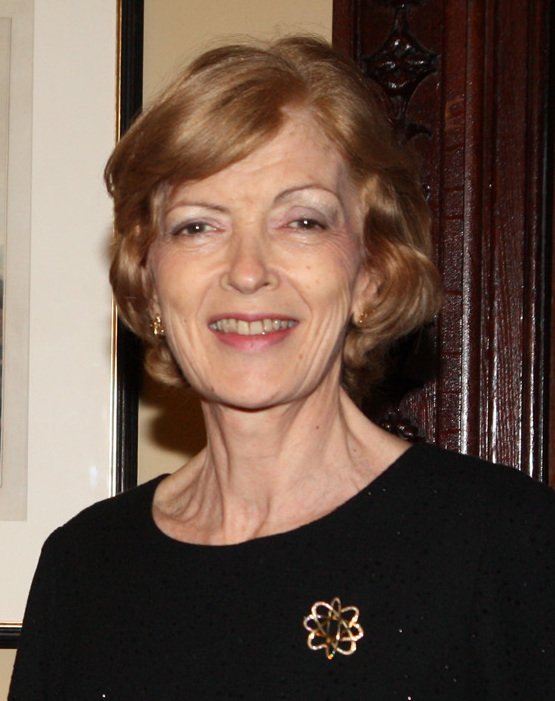
- Woolf in 2014

686th Lord Mayor of London
- In office 8 November 2013 – 7 November 2014
- Preceded by: Sir Roger Gifford
- Succeeded by: Sir Alan Yarrow

Chair of the Independent Inquiry into Child Sexual Abuse
- In office 5 September 2014 – 31 October 2014
- Appointed by: Theresa May (as Home Secretary)
- Preceded by: Baroness Butler-Sloss
- Succeeded by: Dame Lowell Goddard

Personal details
- Born: Catherine Fiona Swain; 11 May 1948 (age 77) Edinburgh, Scotland, United Kingdom
- Spouse: Nicholas Woolf OBE FCA
- Profession: Solicitor
- Website: www.fionawoolf.com

Dame Catherine Fiona Woolf, DBE, DStJ, DL (née Swain; born 11 May 1948) is a British corporate lawyer. She served as the Lord Mayor of London (2013–14), acting as global ambassador for UK-based financial and business services. She has held and still holds many other significant positions in the City of London.

== Early life ==
Catherine Fiona Swain was born in Edinburgh, the daughter of Dr R. H. A. Swain and his wife, Margaret Helen Hart.

She was educated there at St Denis School (subsequently part of St Margaret's School), before going up to Keele University where she graduated in Law and Psychology (BA). She studied comparative law at the University of Strasbourg.

== Career ==
Woolf qualified as a solicitor in 1973 and worked as an assistant at Clifford Chance until 1978. She then moved to CMS Cameron McKenna where she became the firm's first female partner in 1981; she remained a partner until 2004.

A specialist legal advisor on major infrastructure developments, particularly with regard to infrastructure legislation and energy markets, Woolf played a role in the 1985 treaty agreements between the British and French governments concerning the Channel Tunnel. She subsequently went on to work with almost 30 governments around the world. She was a consultant to CMS Cameron McKenna and is a Senior Adviser to London Economics International LLC.

In 2001–02 Woolf was awarded a Senior Fellowship at the Harvard Kennedy School's Center for Business and Government. While at Harvard, she wrote a book on attracting investment in electricity transmission systems: Global Transmission Expansion: Recipes for Success (2003).

Woolf is an Honorary Bencher of Middle Temple, a life position which recognises contributions to the legal profession.

=== Livery companies ===
Woolf is associated with several livery companies. She is a Court Assistant and past Master of the Solicitors', the Plumbers' and the Wax Chandlers' companies, and an Honorary Court Assistant of the Worshipful Company of Builders Merchants. She is also a liveryman of the Arbitrators' company. She is an Honorary Liveryman of The Turners, the Fuellers, Lightmongers, Security Professionals, Tax Advisers and Paviors companies.

=== Presidency of the Law Society ===
Woolf served as president of the Law Society of England and Wales for 2006–07. In her valedictory speech on stepping down, she said that in her year as President she had met with "98 of the top 100 firms and another 25 or so beyond that". She was "delighted to have met with so many top firms...they had a huge number of ideas about what we should be doing for them".

=== Lord Mayor of London ===
On 29 September 2013, she was elected as Lord Mayor of London, only the second time in its 800-year history that a woman has held this office. She succeeded Sir Roger Gifford as Lord Mayor on 8 November 2013 during the annual "Silent Ceremony" at the Guildhall. The City's second female Lord Mayor, following Dame Mary Donaldson (Lord Mayor 1983–84),

Woolf was interviewed by Cathy Newman for a profile article in The Daily Telegraph, taking the opportunity to promote one of her mayoral campaigning themes, namely the furtherance of women in executive careers and the correction of the traditional imbalance between the sexes in senior City positions. She sponsored a Long Finance initiative during her year as Lord Mayor, "Financing Tomorrow's Cities", which examined new mechanisms for funding sustainability.

She made regular media appearances about the Lord Mayor's role in welcoming the world to London, and ventured onto a catwalk at the Old Bailey during London Fashion Week.

=== Other ===
She was the Chancellor of the University of Law 2014–2018. She was a member of the Competition Commission (UK) 2005–2013, Alderman for the Ward of Candlewick in the City of London 2007–2018, and was Sheriff of London for 2010 – 2011. Woolf was appointed Deputy Lieutenant of Greater London, in March 2016. She is a Trustee of the Science Museum and Honorary President of the Aldersgate Group

=== Independent Inquiry into Child Sexual Abuse ===
On 5 September 2014 it was announced that Woolf would chair the independent panel inquiry that would examine how the UK's institutions have handled their duties to protect children from sexual abuse.

On 21 October 2014, Woolf disclosed that she lived in the same London street as Lord Brittan and had invited the Conservative peer and his wife, Diana Brittan, to dinner on three occasions. Lord Brittan had been Home Secretary in 1984 when ministers were handed a dossier on alleged high-profile paedophiles; he has insisted that the proper procedures were followed. In total, she had dined with Lord Brittan and his family five times since 2008, and also had joined Lady Brittan for coffee on a "small number of occasions".

Woolf further disclosed that she had been involved in the past with bodies with which the Brittans had also had involvement. The BBC reported that survivors of child abuse were increasingly concerned about her apparent links to Lord Brittan, and Labour MP Simon Danczuk, who campaigned for the inquiry, said he thought Woolf should resign. Woolf made the disclosures to MPs ahead of her appearance before the Home Affairs Select Committee, saying she was aware of "speculation gaining traction on social media" about her links with the Brittans and she wanted to:

go the extra distance to make sure I have dug out every possible connection with someone who is essentially one of thousands of people I know in the City. […] Do I have a close association with them (the Brittans)? The answer is no. Let us remind ourselves that this is not an inquiry about Lord Brittan but about hundreds of institutions and frankly thousands of systemic failures.

On 22 October, the BBC reported that it had seen a judicial review application launched by a victim of historical child sexual abuse which challenged the choice of Woolf as the chair of this inquiry on the basis that she was not impartial, had no relevant expertise and might not have time to discharge her duties. The judicial review hearing could have been held before the end of 2014.

On 31 October 2014, she resigned her chairmanship of the panel.

== Honours ==
- DBE (2015) - CBE, 2002
- DStJ (2013) - SSStJ, 2010;

Woolf was appointed Commander of the Order of the British Empire (CBE) for "services to the U.K. Knowledge Economy and Invisible Earnings" in 2002 and Dame Commander of the Order of the British Empire (DBE) in the 2015 New Year Honours for "services to the legal profession, diversity, and the City of London", in recognition of her longstanding commitments in public life.

== Charitable work and other interests ==
Woolf is involved in supporting the work of a number of charitable and other organisations. She was a trustee of Raleigh International 2010–2016, and a governor of the Guildhall School of Music and Drama. She is also President of the Chelsea Opera Group Trust, and is actively involved in the operation, fundraising and co-ordination of its volunteers, as well as being a member of its choir and a Trustee of the Wexford Festival Opera Trust

Civic offices
Preceded by Sir Roger Gifford	Lord Mayor of London; 2013–2014	Succeeded by Sir Alan Yarrow
