= Kysorychi =

- Village
- Location of Kysorychi within Ukraine
- Coordinates: 51°11′N 27°16′E
- Country: Ukraine
- Oblast: Rivne Oblast
- Raion: Sarny Raion

Kysorychi (Ukrainian: Кисоричі, Polish: Kisorycze) is a village located in Sarny Raion, Rivne Oblast, Ukraine, but was formerly administered within Rokytne Raion. Before the 1939 Nazi German and Soviet invasions of Poland, the village was named Kisorycze and was located in Gmina Kisorycze, Sarny County, Wołyń Voivodeship in the eastern part of the Second Polish Republic. The biggest employer in the area was a glass factory in Rokytne (Рокитне) 8 km north of town, employing 400 workers.

== World War II ==
The village was one of hundreds of sites of mass killings during the wave of massacres of Poles in Volhynia between 1942 and 1945. Polish families were murdered there by UPA death squads aided by the local Ukrainians; as in the case of the Żołnowski family, choked to death with a rope by their own neighbors. The eye-witness account was provided by the wife, Janina Żołnowska, who survived by pretending to be dead. The local Polish teacher Felicja Masojada, with Kasper Koziński and his Ukrainian wife Hanka née Sawicka and maid Cita, were ambushed on the road. Hanka Kozińska (having been born in Ukraine) was sent home, but the rest were led into the forest by a death squad (sotnia) comprising Hrytsko Kashketsyuk, Ivan Kulpach "Tryhub", Ivan Shelyuk, Ivan Voloshyn, and Kostyantyn and Semen Kovalchuk, where the women were hanged upside down and dismembered.

== See also ==
- History of Poland (1939–1945)
- Historiography of the Volyn tragedy
