= Worshipful Company of Entrepreneurs =

Livery Company of the City of London

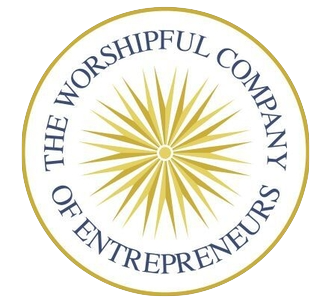
- Logo of the Worshipful Company of Entrepreneurs
- Motto: Dare, Create, Succeed
- Location: London, United Kingdom
- Date of formation: 2014
- Company association: Entrepreneurship
- Order of precedence: 112th
- Master of company: James John Sherrington Talbot
- Website: entrepreneurscompany.org

The Worshipful Company of Entrepreneurs is a livery company of the City of London. It petitioned the Court of Aldermen for guild status in 2014, became a company without livery in October 2020, and became a full livery company in February 2025. It is a membership and charitable organisation formed of people connected with the City of London who have invested their own time and financial resources in establishing and running successful businesses and enterprises. Its motto is Dare, Create, Succeed

The Company of Entrepreneurs Trust is a charity that was registered in England & Wales in 2016 (as the Guild of Entrepreneurs Trust). It is a grant-making body, which principally supports business education.

== Formation and early history ==
Dan Doherty (a liveryman of the Needlemakers’ Company), had already founded and was running a successful informal group for Entrepreneurs called “Entrepreneurs – City of London Network”. The membership of this group included a number of liverymen of the city’s livery companies, and from amongst them and others, the founding committee of the proposed guild was drawn. With assistance from the Chamberlain’s Court and from Adèle Thorpe, a Past Master of the Worshipful Company of Chartered Secretaries and Administrators and clerk of many years’ standing, a proposal document was drawn up and delivered to the Court of Aldermen. It was accompanied by numerous letters of support from amongst the City livery companies, academic institutions and businesses. Approval was given for the formation of the new guild on 8 July 2014.

Formal working party meetings were held in August and September 2014 to approve the rules and suggested governance of the guild, and, on 8 September 2014, the guild’s first Court Meeting was held at the Old Bailey.

On 24 November 2014, the guild had its official launch at Ironmongers’ Hall (Worshipful Company of Ironmongers). The event was attended by the then Lord Mayor, the Sheriffs, Masters and Clerks representing over half of the city’s (then) 110 livery companies, as well as numerous guests.

The company has a wide range of Outreach & Educational projects in which freemen (members of the company, whether men or women) undertake mentoring for students of business and entrepreneurship as well as fledgling businesses and entrepreneurial activities. The Company of Entrepreneurs Trust is a charitable foundation set up in 2016, but operating independently. Its primary objective is to raise and distribute money to support education and charity relating to entrepreneurship.

=== Objectives ===
The objectives of the company are to:

- promote excellence in the profession of Entrepreneurship;
- support the Lord Mayor, encourage the growth of the city and promote its full potential to entrepreneurs and growth businesses;
- foster fellowship among entrepreneurs;
- give money and time for charitable works that support education in enterprise; the development of entrepreneurs; and help to bring the opportunities of entrepreneurship to all.

== Motto ==
The company's motto is Dare, Create, Succeed. The motto encapsulates the criteria that an individual must fulfil before they may be considered for the freedom of the company: to be audacious and daring in identifying new opportunities; to have personally financed, created and run businesses or enterprises to harness those opportunities; and for those businesses or enterprises to have been successful.

== Organisation ==
The company is governed by its court, which is made up of the Master, three Wardens, the most recent five Past Masters and between six and twenty court assistants elected from the freemen. The Master and Wardens are elected annually at the election court in June/July, and take office at the installation court in November. The Clerk is the chief executive of the company. The first Clerk was Adele Thorpe. Duncan Simms has been Clerk since February 2015.
