= Tim Hailes =

English lawyer (born 1967)

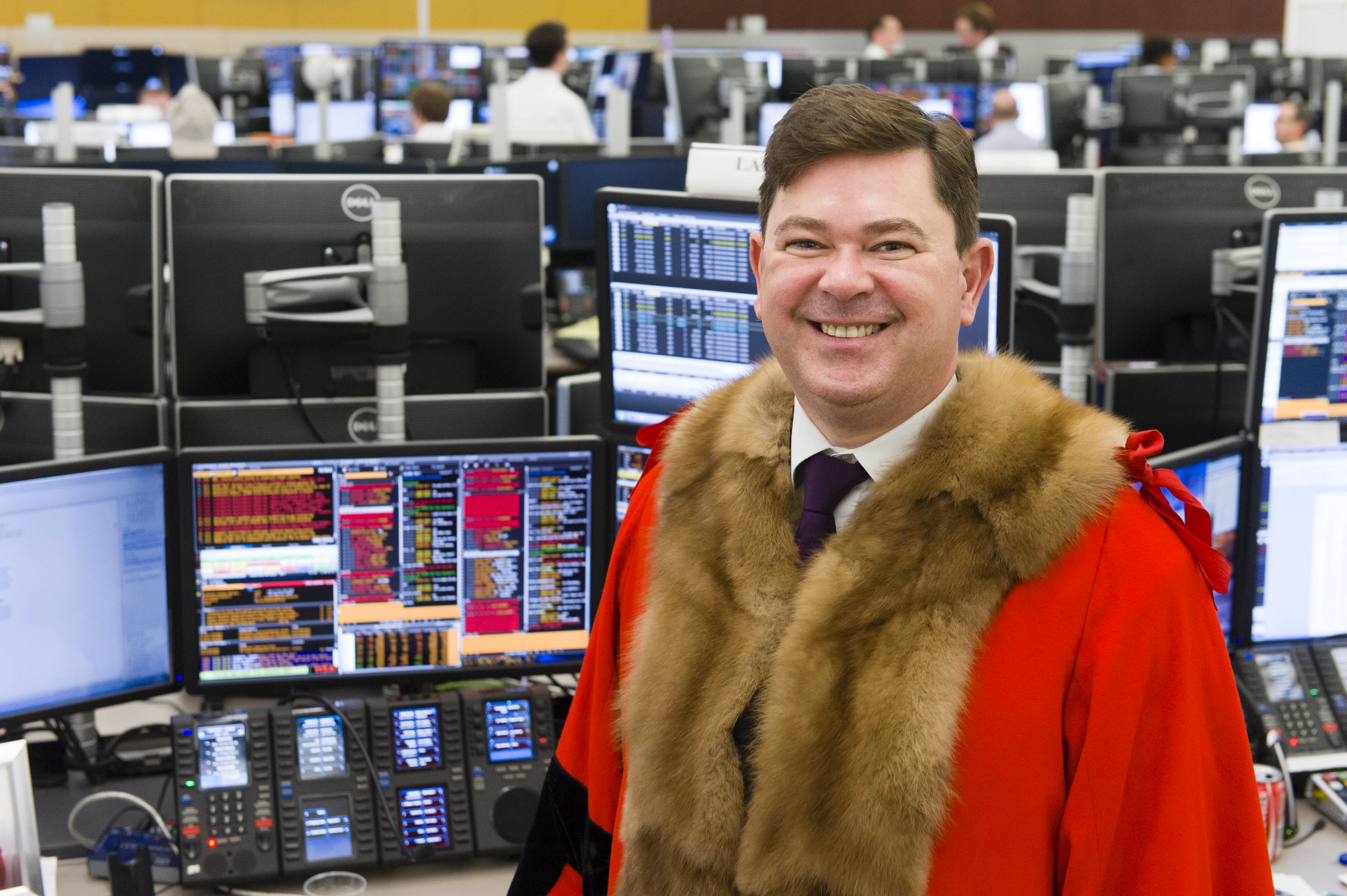
- Alderman and Sheriff Timothy Hailes MStJ JP FKC

Personal details
- Born: 7 October 1967 (age 58) Dorchester, UK
- Education: King's College London (BA (Hons)); University of West England (LSF); University of West England (Hon LLD)
- Profession: Lawyer
- Website: www.timhailes.com

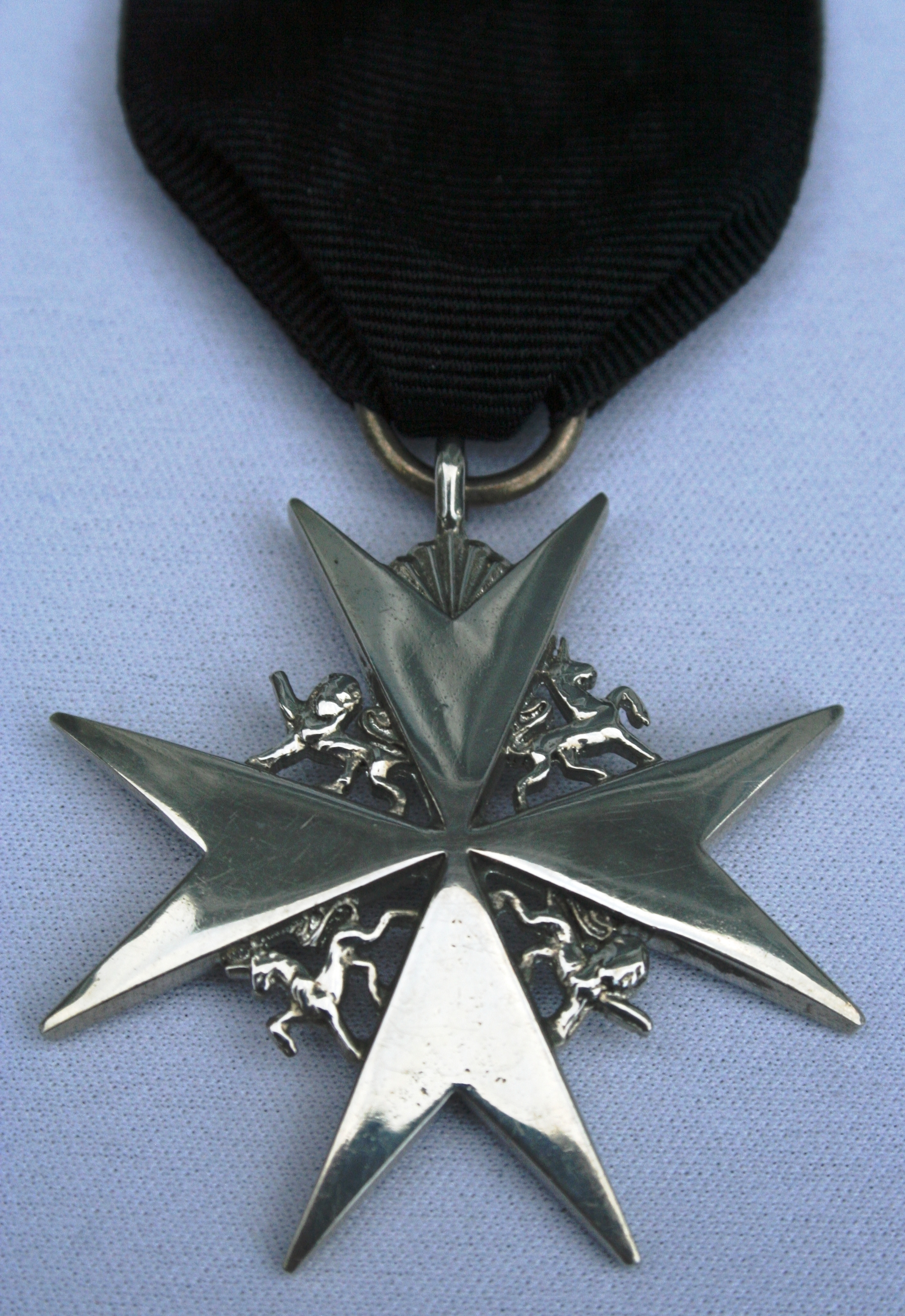
MStJ Badge

Timothy Russell Hailes MStJ JP FKC (born 7 October 1967, Dorchester) is a former managing director and associate general counsel in the Investment Banking Division of JPMorgan Chase & Co, and currently general counsel and executive director at Five Islands Capital Limited. He was appointed a justice of the peace for the Central London Justice Area in March 2013, elected alderman for the Ward of Bassishaw in The City of London in May 2013, and elected Sheriff of the City of London for 2017-2018.

== Early life ==
Hailes was born in Dorchester, the son of David Hailes by his wife Blenda. He attended Hampton School and Bristol Grammar School, before going to King's College London where he graduated with a B.A. (Hons) degree in medieval and early modern history. Alderman Hailes is a Jelf medalist (1990) and served as a member of College Council and a sabbatical officer in KCLSU from 1988 to 1989. Whilst at college he also served in a political capacity to two members of Margaret Thatcher's cabinet (Rt. Hon William Waldegrave, M.P. and Rt. Hon. Peter Walker, M.P) and was the national student chairman of a conservative student pressure group. Hailes completed his postgraduate studies and professional training in the Law at University of West England in 1993.

== Career ==
Alderman Hailes spent six years in private practice, qualifying as a solicitor in 1995 with a leading City law firm and subsequently practicing with a leading Wall Street law firm in their London office during which he was seconded to the trading floors of clients Natwest Financial Products plc and Union Bank of Switzerland.

In 1999, Hailes joined JPMorgan and became co-head of the Global Equities & Global Regulatory Reform Practice Groups of the Corporate and Investment Bank Legal Department and the senior lawyer in the EMEA region for regulatory modernisation. In 2019 Hailes left JPMorgan to join Five Islands Capital Ltd, a FinTech solutions company, from which he resigned in 2024

== Organisations ==
Hailes has served on a number of derivatives industry committees (including co-chairing the ISDA fund derivatives committee) and is a regular contributor to publications particularly on developments in the equities markets and structured products sold to retail investors. He acted as a technical expert to the UK FSA 2009 Lehman review and has appeared in front of IOSCO standing committees, the European Commission, the Chinese Banking and Regulatory Commission and numerous other regulatory authorities on behalf of the financial services industry. He is currently the Chairman of the Joint Association Committee (co-sponsored by ISDA, SIFMA, AFME and the ICMA) on Retail Structured Products (the "JAC").

Hailes is a liveryman of the City of London Solicitors' Company, and the Worshipful Company of International Bankers, a liveryman of the Worshipful Company of Pewterers, a magistrate (Justice of the Peace) on the Central London bench and a member of The Royal Institute of International Affairs (Chatham House).

Hailes was the Chairman of the London chapter of Pride from 2004 - 2011. Pride is the employee networking group for lesbian, gay, transgender and bisexual employees at JPMorgan. He is also the EMEA diversity representative on the Legal Department Diversity Council.

Hailes is a Life Governor of the RNLI, for which his father was Treasurer of the local lifeboat station in Weymouth.

Hailes is Vice-Chairman of the Governors of King Edward's School, Witley.

== Committees ==
In his capacity as a member of the Court of Aldermen and the Court of Common Council, Hailes serves on the Community and Children's Services Committee, the Markets Committee and the Audit & Risk Committee of the City of London Corporation.

== Awards and honours ==
Upon qualification as a Solicitor in 1995, Hailes was awarded the Wig and Pen Prize by the Combined Law Societies of Central London. In October 2014 Hailes was recognised by the Legal 500 UK and announced the in-house finance lawyer of the year and in the same month was included in the top 100 FT out and proud heroes of the business world.

Hailes is a fellow of King's College London and a Member of the Order of St John (2018). Hailes received an Honorary Degree of Doctor of Laws from his alma mater, University of West England in 2018.

== Arms ==
Coat of arms of Tim Hailes
Adopted 2013 Crest A Griffin sejant erect Gules winged Azure platy beaked and legged Or holding in the dexter forefoot a Sword erect Argent hilt and pommel Gules and resting the sinister forefoot upon a Bezant Escutcheon Per chevron Azure platy and Or a Fleur-de-Lis in base Gules Motto SAGAX INTEGER FIDELIS Orders Badge of a Member of the Order of St John
