= Court of Aldermen =

Elected body, part of the City of London Corporation

City Court of Aldermen
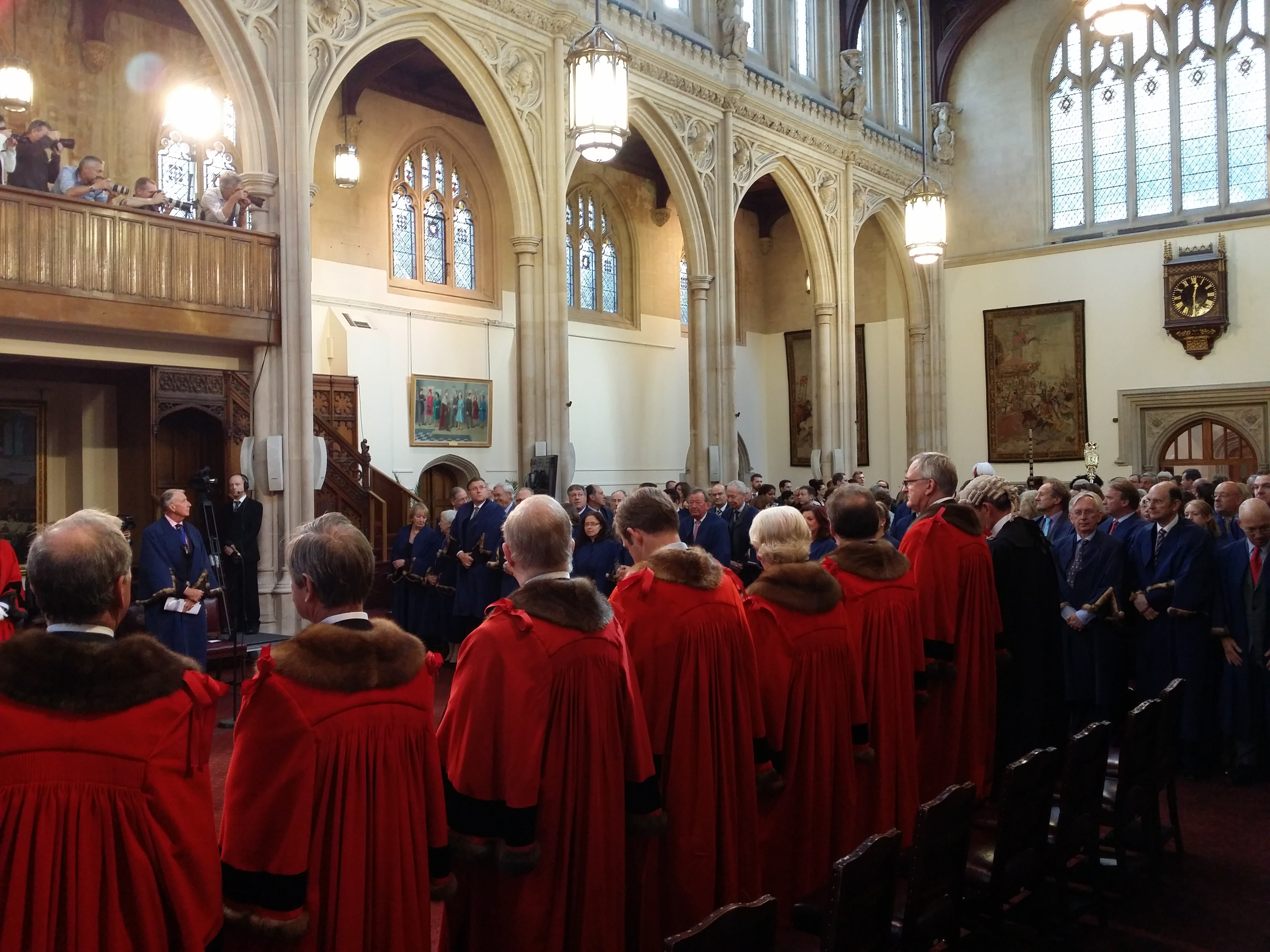
- Aldermen (robed in scarlet) at Guildhall

Type
- Type: Committee of the City of London Corporation
- Term limits: None

History
- Founded: Time immemorial
- Preceded by: Court of Husting

Leadership
- Lady Mayor: Susan Langley since 7 November 2025

Structure
- Seats: 25 Aldermen
- Independent: 25 / 25

Meeting place
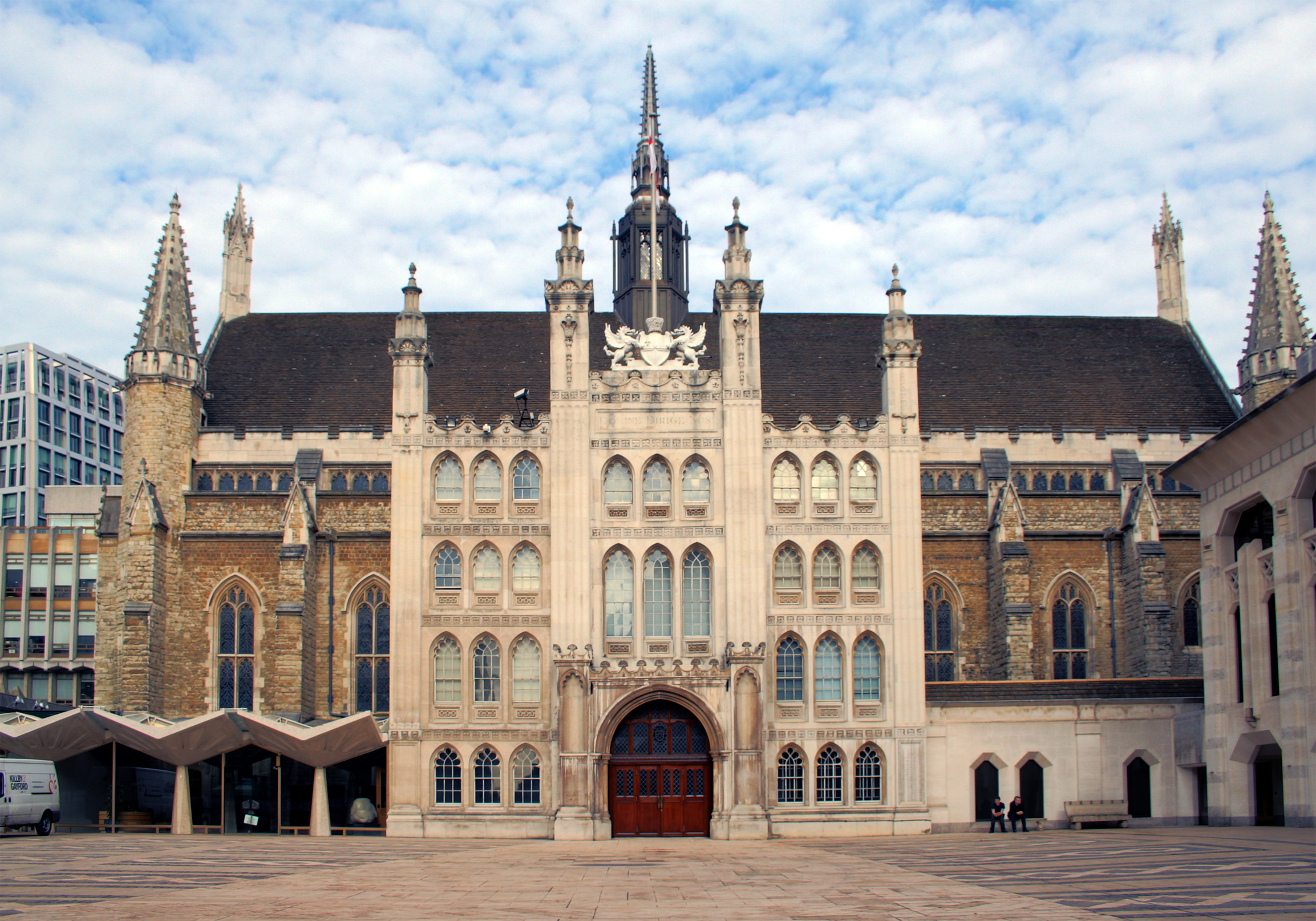
- Guildhall of London

The Court of Aldermen forms part of the senior governance of the City of London Corporation. It comprises twenty-five Aldermen of the City of London, presided over by the Lady Mayor (the Lady Mayor becomes senior Alderman while in the office). The Court was originally responsible for the entire administration of the City, but most of its responsibilities were subsumed by the Court of Common Council in the fourteenth century. The Court of Aldermen meets seven times a year in the Aldermen's Court Room at Guildhall. The few remaining duties of the Court include approving people for Freedom of the City, approving the formation of new livery companies, and appointing the Recorder of London.

== History ==
It is probable that no definite account of the origin of the office of Alderman, or of the body known as the Court of Aldermen can ever be written for, and is likely that the office of the Aldermen of the City of London came into existence by a process of natural growth and development created by the necessities of the times. The first possible mention of the court comes from 1200, 'fiveand-twenty of the more discreet men of the City' were 'sworn to take counsel on behalf of the City together with the Mayor', although this could possibly be an early form of the London Common Council, as in 1200 there were only 24 wards.

== Term of office ==
Although there is no compulsion by law to do so, Aldermen usually submit themselves for re-election every six years and by custom retire at the age of 70.

In 2020, David Graves declined to stand for re-election after six years as Alderman for Cripplegate, stating "given the current CV-19 concerns and limitations, I decided that to trigger a 42 ... day electoral process now would be inappropriate and unsuitable for the good conduct of a fair election". He again deferred standing for re-election in 2021 for the same reason, triggering calls for the reform of the law relating to this election.

== List of current aldermen ==
Ward	Alderman	Notes
Aldersgate	Christopher Makin	
Aldgate	Dame Susan Langley	Sheriff 2023/24; Lady Mayor 2025/26
Bassishaw	Tim Hailes	Sheriff 2017/18
Billingsgate	Bronek Masojada	Sheriff 2023/24; Lord Mayor 2026/27
Bishopsgate	Kawsar Zaman	
Bread Street	Sir William Russell	Sheriff 2016/17; Lord Mayor 2019/20 and 2020/21
Bridge and Bridge Without	The Hon. Timothy Levene	Sheriff 2026/27
Broad Street	Michael Mainelli	Sheriff 2019/20 and 2020/21; Lord Mayor 2023/24
Candlewick	Emma Edhem	
Castle Baynard	Martha Grekos	
Cheap	Robert Hughes-Penney	Sheriff 2025/26
Coleman Street	Sushil Kumar Saluja	
Cordwainer	Alexander Barr	Supported by the Court of Aldermen for election to office of Sheriff 2027/28
Cornhill	Robert Howard	
Cripplegate	Elizabeth King	
Dowgate	Alison Gowman	Sheriff 2021/22
Farringdon Within	Vincent Keaveny	Sheriff 2018/19; Lord Mayor 2021/22
Farringdon Without	Gregory Jones KC	Sheriff 2024/25
Langbourn	Simon Pryke	
Lime Street	Sir Charles Bowman	Sheriff 2015/16; Lord Mayor 2017/18
Portsoken	Prem Goyal	Sheriff 2026/27
Queenhithe	Sir Alastair King	Sheriff 2022/23; Lord Mayor 2024/25
Tower	Sir Nicholas Lyons	Sheriff 2021/22; Lord Mayor 2022/23
Vintry	Sir Andrew Parmley	Sheriff 2014/15; Lord Mayor 2016/17
Walbrook	Jennette Newman	

== See also ==
- Wards of the City of London
- Sheriff of the City of London
