= Lord Mayor of London =

Mayor of the City of London and leader of the City of London Corporation

- Flag of the Lord Mayor
- Incumbent; Bronek Masojada since 16 November 2026
- Style: My Lord/Lady mayor The Right Honourable
- Residence: Mansion House, EC4
- Appointer: Electors: Aldermen
- Term length: One year
- Inaugural holder: Sir Henry FitzAlan
- Formation: 1189
- Salary: None (pro bono)
- Website: Official website

The lord or lady mayor of London is the mayor of the City of London, England, and the leader of the City of London Corporation. Within the City, the lord mayor is accorded precedence over all individuals except the sovereign and retains various traditional powers, rights, and privileges, including the title and style The Right Honourable Lord Mayor of London.

One of the world's oldest continuously elected civic offices, it is entirely separate from the directly elected mayor of London, a political office controlling a budget which covers the much larger area of Greater London.

The Corporation of London changed its name to the City of London Corporation in 2006, and accordingly the title Lord Mayor of the City of London was introduced, so as to avoid confusion with that of Mayor of London. The legal and commonly used title remains Lord/Lady Mayor of London. The lord/lady mayor is elected at Common Hall each year on Michaelmas, and takes office on the Friday before the second Saturday in November, at The Silent Ceremony. The Lord Mayor's Show is held on the day after taking office; the lord mayor, preceded by a procession, travels to the Royal Courts of Justice at the Strand to swear allegiance to the Sovereign/Monarch before the Justices of the High Court.

Currently, the lord mayor's main role is to represent and promote the businesses and residents in the City of London. Today these are mostly financial businesses, and the lord mayor is regarded as the champion of the entire UK-based financial sector. As leader of the Corporation of the City of London, the lord mayor serves as the key spokesman for the local authority and also has important ceremonial and social responsibilities. The lord mayor is non-affiliated politically (not a member of any political party), typically delivering hundreds of speeches and addresses per year and attending many receptions and other events in London and beyond, and usually makes overseas visits under the auspices of the FCDO. The lord mayor is ex officio Rector of City University of London and Admiral of the Port of London.

The lord mayor is assisted by the Mansion House Esquires including the City Marshal, Sword Bearer and Common Crier, as well as the Chaplain, Venerable Ray Pentland. The lord mayor has six Cadet Aides de Camp representing the Uniformed Youth Organisation branches connecting with the City Cadet Forces. The ADCs welcome inquiries to arrange new affiliations.

== Titles and honours ==
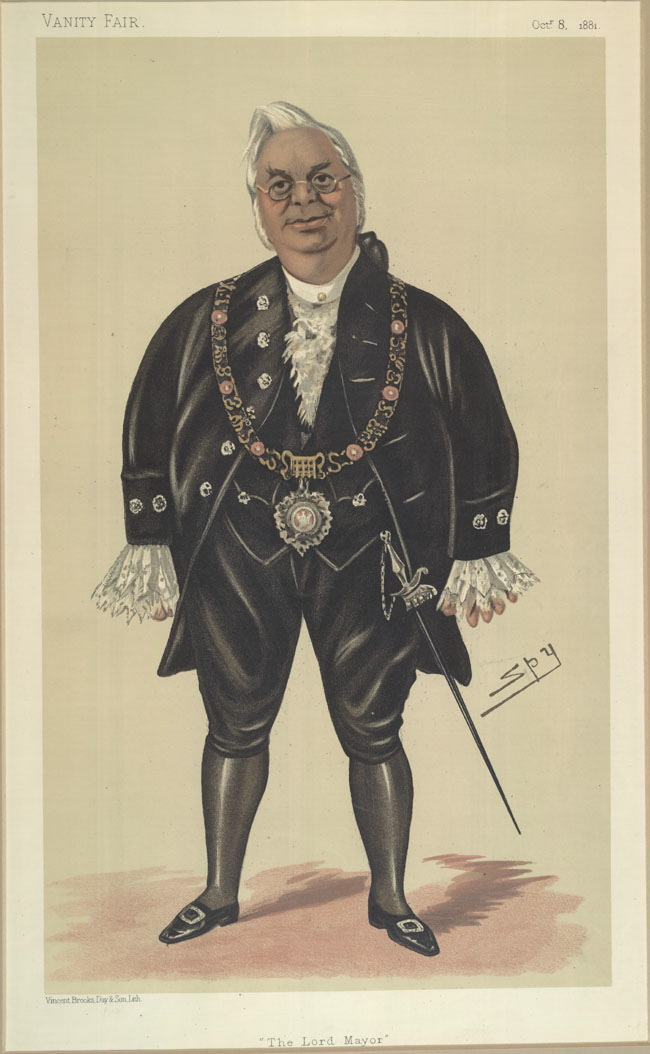
Sir William McArthur, lord mayor of London, caricatured by Leslie Ward, 1881

Of the 69 cities in the United Kingdom, the City of London is among the 30 with lord mayors, or, in Scotland, lords provost. The lord mayor is entitled to the prefix The Right Honourable. The same privilege extends only to the lord mayors of York, Cardiff, Bristol and Belfast, and to the lords provost of Edinburgh and Glasgow. The style is used when referring to the office, not to the holder: thus, "The Rt Hon Lord Mayor of London" would be correct, while "The Rt Hon Alastair King" would be incorrect. The prefix applies personally only to privy counsellors and peers.

Women who have previously held the office have been known as a lord mayor. Alderwoman Dame Susan Langley, who took office in November 2025, announced her intention to adopt the style of Lady Mayor following the established precedent of having Lady Justices and currently a Lady Chief Justice. The wife of a male lord mayor is styled as Lady Mayoress, but no equivalent title exists for the husband of a female lord mayor or lady mayor. A female lord mayor or an unmarried male lord mayor, may appoint a female consort, usually a fellow member of the Corporation, to the role of lady mayoress. In speech, a lord mayor is referred to as "My Lord Mayor", and a lady mayoress as "My Lady Mayoress".

It was once customary for lord mayors to be appointed knights upon taking office and baronets upon retirement, unless they already held such a title. This custom was generally followed from the 16th to the 19th centuries; creations became more regular from 1889 onward. From 1964 onward, the regular creation of hereditary titles such as baronetcies was phased out, so subsequent lord mayors were offered knighthoods, and until 1993, most often as Knight Grand Cross of the Order of the British Empire (GBE)).

Since 1993, lord mayors have not automatically received a national honour upon appointment, but have been made knights bachelor upon retirement. Gordon Brown's Government broke with that tradition by making Ian Luder a CBE after his term of office in 2009, and the following year Nick Anstee declined offers of an honour.

Foreign heads of state visiting the City of London on a UK state visit, diplomatically bestow upon the lord mayor one of their suitable national honours. For example, in 2001 King Abdullah II of Jordan created Sir David Howard a Grand Cordon (First Class) of the Order of Independence. Recently, lord mayors at the beginning of their term have been appointed knights or dames of St John by the late Queen Elizabeth II, Sovereign Head of the Order of St John until her death in 2022.

== History ==
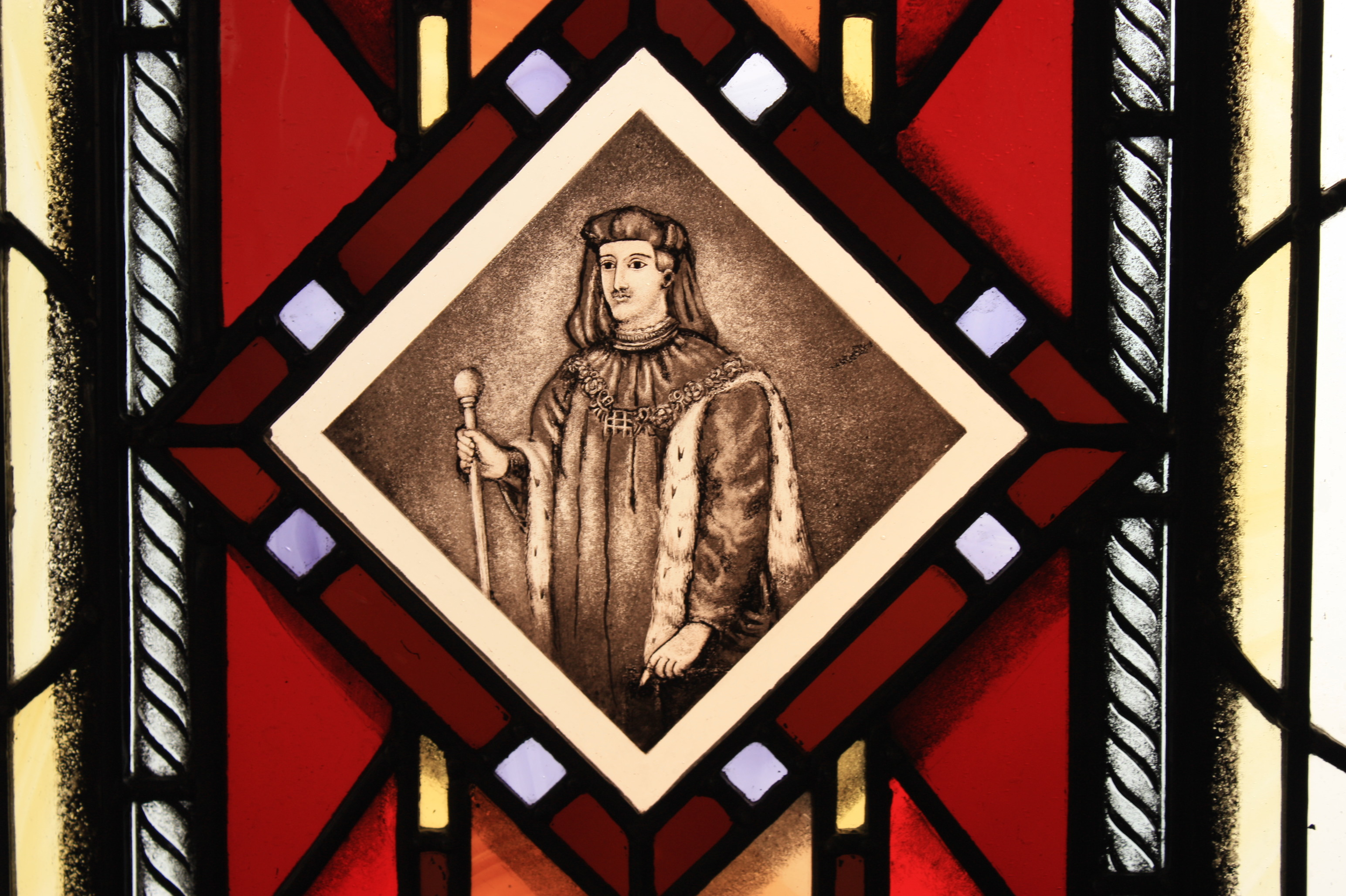
Stained glass in Guildhall, London, showing Henry fitz Ailwin

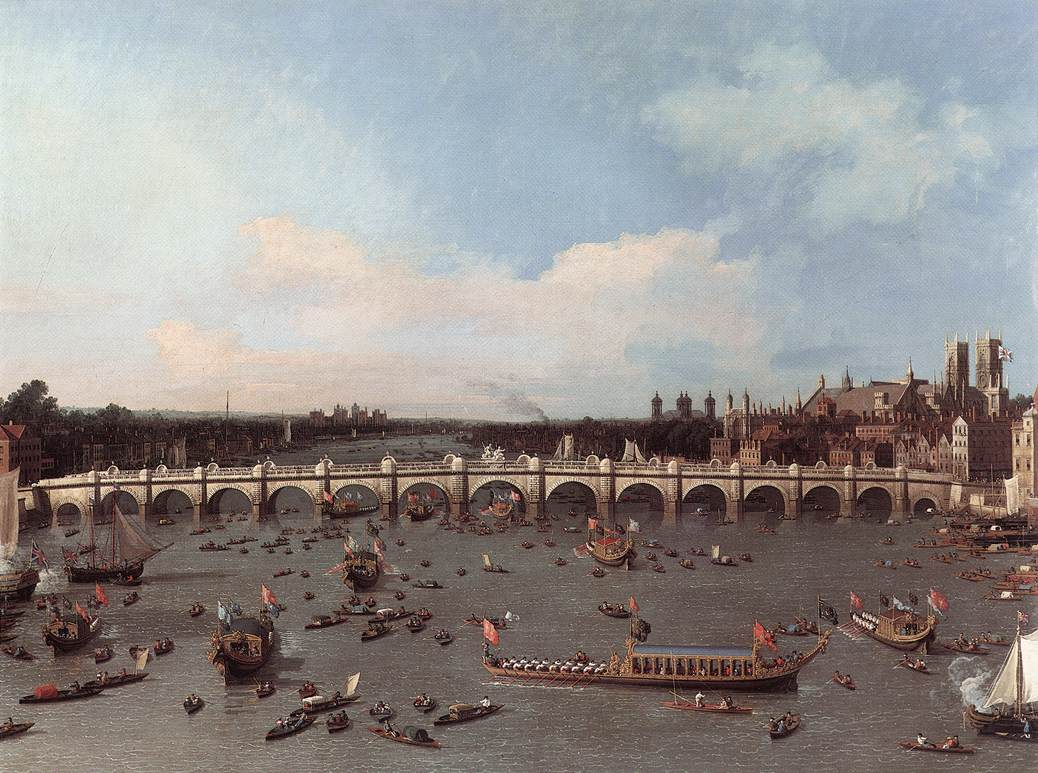
In 1747, the Lord Mayor proceeded to Westminster Hall via barge on the River Thames.

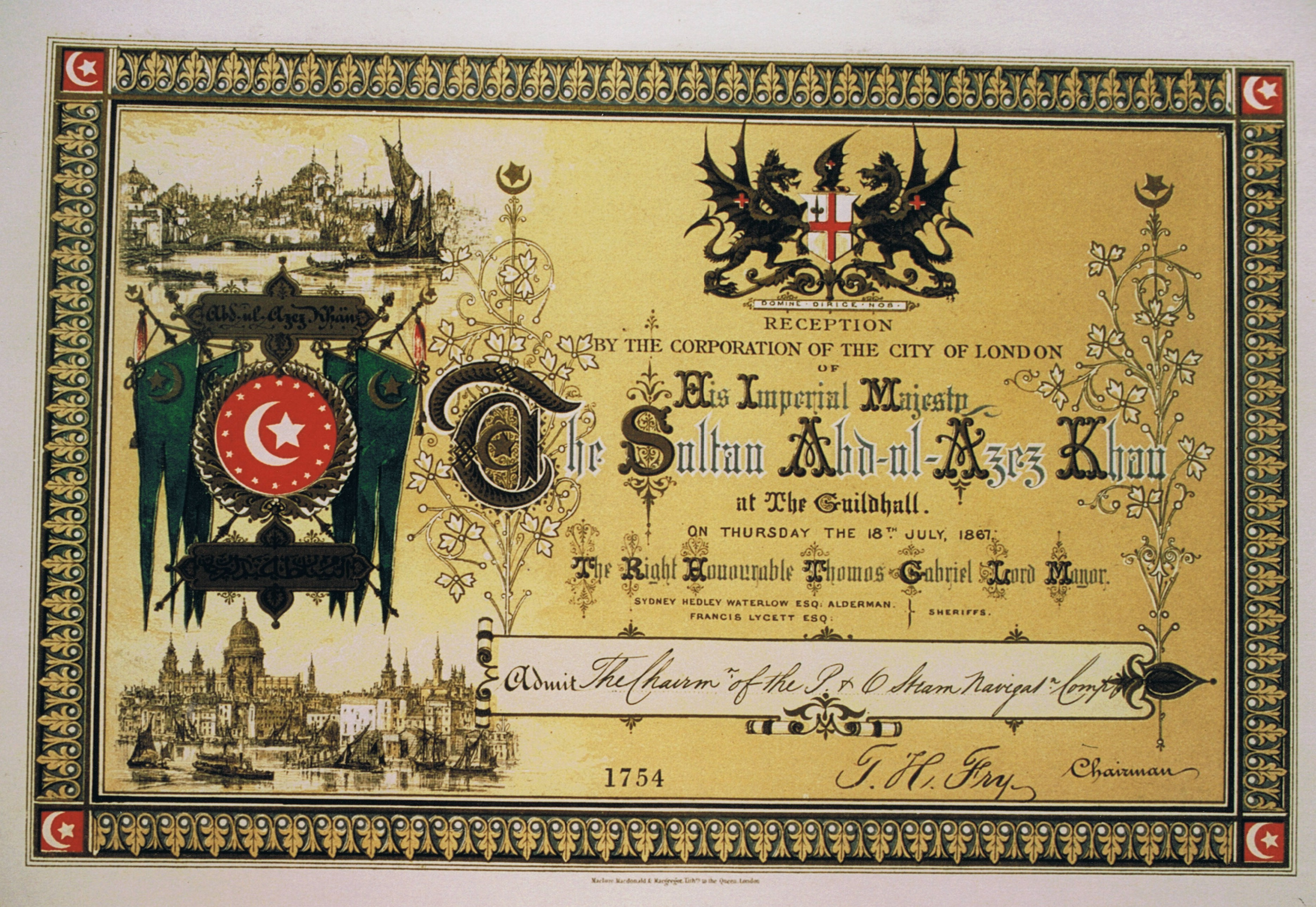
A copy of an admission ticket as issued to the Chairman of P & O Navigation Company for Lord Mayor Sir Thomas Gabriel's reception of Sultan Abd-ul-Aziz Khan at Guildhall, 18 July 1867

The office of Mayor was instituted in 1189, the first holder being Henry Fitz-Ailwin de Londonestone. The Mayor of the City of London has been elected by the City, rather than appointed by the sovereign, since a royal charter issued by King John in 1215. The title "Lord Mayor" came to be used after 1354, when it was granted to Thomas Legge by King Edward III.

Lord mayors are elected for one-year terms, and customarily serve only one term. Numerous individuals have served multiple terms, including:

As mayor

- 24 terms: Sir Henry fitz Ailwin(1189–1212)
- 9 terms: Ralph de Sandwich (1285–1289, 1289–1292)
- 8 terms: Gregory de Rokesley (1274–1280, 1284)
- 7 terms: Andrew Buckerel (1231–1237); John le Breton (1289, 1293–1298); John le Blund (1301–1307)
- 6 terms: Richard le Ranger (1222–1226, 1238); Hamo de Chigwell (1319, 1321, 1322, 1324, 1325, 1327)
- 5 terms: Serlo le Mercer (1214, 1218–1221)

As lord mayor

- Sir Nicholas Brembre (1377, 1383–1385; 4 terms)
- Sir Richard ('Dick') Whittington (1397, 1398, 1406 and 1419; 4 terms)
- William Sevenoke (1418)
- Sir Robert Fowler (elected in 1883 and 1885).
- Sir William Russell (2019–2021, 2 terms)

Almost 700 people have served as lord mayor.

The first woman elected was Dame Mary Donaldson in 1983. Both she and Dame Fiona Woolf, elected in 2013, held office as lord mayor. Dame Susan Langley, when elected in 2025, opted to be known as Lady Mayor.

Some lord mayors in the Middle Ages, such as Sir Edward Dalyngrigge (1392), did not live in London. Since 1435, the lord mayor has been chosen from amongst the aldermen of the City of London.

== Election ==
The lord mayor is elected at Common Hall, comprising liverymen belonging to all of the City's livery companies. Common Hall is summoned by the sitting lord mayor. It meets at Guildhall on Michaelmas Day (29 September) or on the closest weekday. Voting is by show of hands. If any liveryman so demands, balloting is held a fortnight later.

The qualification to stand for election is that one must have served as a City sheriff and be a current alderman. Since 1385, prior service as sheriff has been mandatory for election to the lord mayoralty. Two sheriffs are selected annually by Common Hall, which meets on Midsummer's Day for this purpose.

By an ordinance of 1435, the lord mayor must be chosen from amongst the aldermen of the City of London. Those on the electoral roll of each of the City's 25 wards select one alderman, who formerly held office for life or until resignation. Each alderman must now submit for re-election at least once in every six years.

The lord mayor is sworn in each November, on the day before the Lord Mayor's Show (see below). The ceremony is known as the "Silent Ceremony" because, aside from a short declaration by the incoming lord mayor, no speeches are made. At Guildhall, the outgoing lord mayor transfers the mayoral insignia – the seal, the purse, the sword and the mace — to the incoming lord mayor.

== Lord Mayor's Show ==
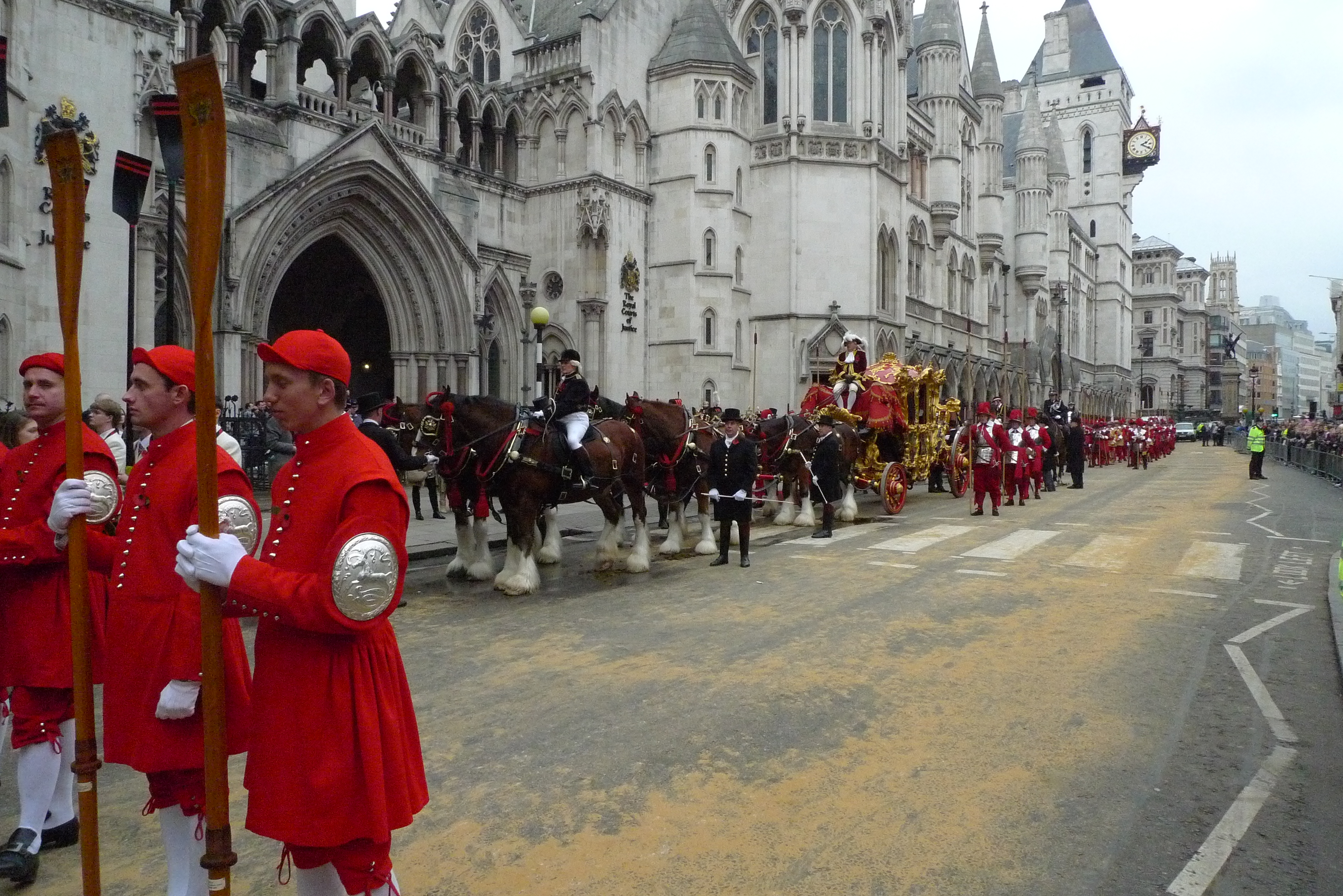
The Doggett's Coat & Badgemen, State Coach and Company of Pikemen and Musketeers of the Honourable Artillery Company) awaiting the lord mayor outside the Royal Courts of Justice, November 2011

The day after being sworn into office, the lord mayor leads a procession from the City of London to the Royal Courts of Justice in the City of Westminster, where the lord mayor swears allegiance to the Crown. This pageantry has evolved into one of London's longest-running and most popular annual events, known as the "Lord Mayor's Show". The lord mayor travels in the City's state coach that was built in 1757 at a cost of £1,065.0s.3d. Today, this festival combines traditional British pageantry with the element of carnival. Since 1959 it has been held on the second Saturday in November. Participants include the livery companies, bands and members of the military, charities and schools. In the evening, a fireworks display is held.

== Role ==
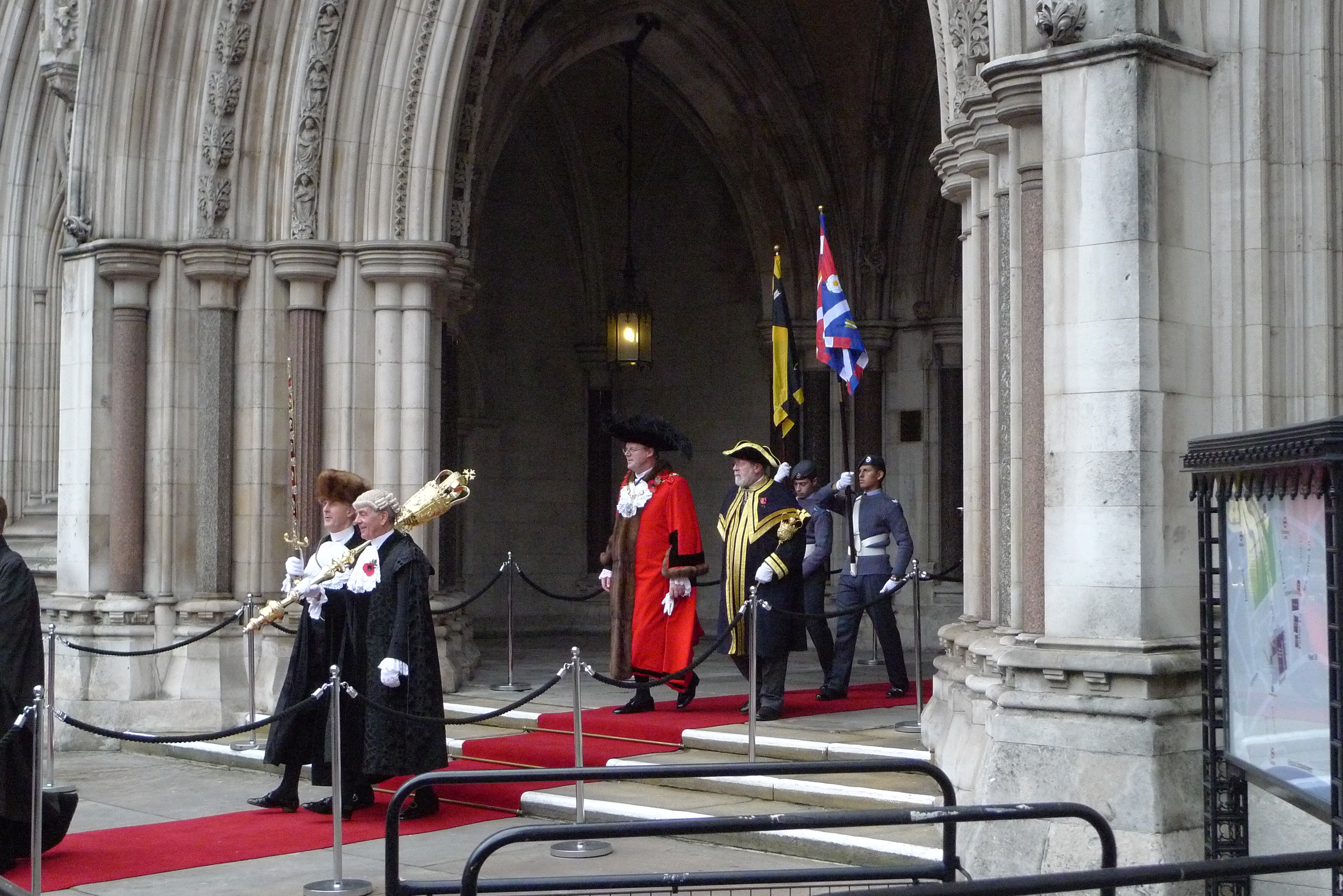
Lord Mayor David Wootton and entourage emerging from the Royal Courts of Justice, at the end of the 2011 Lord Mayor's Show

The lord mayor is a member of the City of London's governing body, the City of London Corporation, incorporated as The Mayor and Commonalty and Citizens of the City of London. The Corporation comprises the Court of Aldermen and the Court of Common Council. The Court of Aldermen includes only the aldermen. The Court of Common Council includes both aldermen and common councilmen. The lord mayor belongs to and presides over both bodies.

The main role of the lord mayor is to represent, support and promote all aspects of the UK's financial service industries, including maritime. This is undertaken as head of the City of London Corporation and includes hosting visiting foreign government ministers, business people and dignitaries as well as conducting foreign visits of their own.

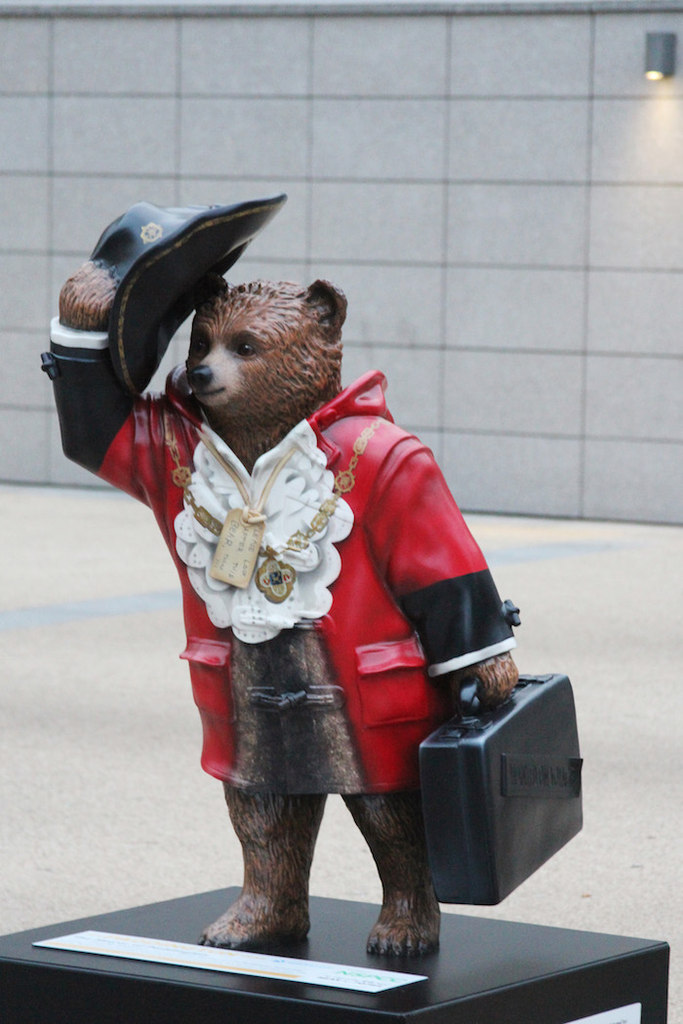
Lord Mayor of London-themed Paddington Bear statue in 2014, auctioned to raise funds for the National Society for the Prevention of Cruelty to Children (NSPCC)

Banquets hosted by the lord mayor serve as opportunities for senior government figures to deliver major speeches. At the Lord Mayor's Banquet, held on the Monday after the Lord Mayor's Show, the Prime Minister delivers the keynote address. At the Bankers' Dinner in June, the Chancellor of the Exchequer delivers a speech known as the "Mansion House Speech", which takes its name from the lord mayor's residence. At the Easter Banquet, also hosted each year at the Mansion House, the Foreign Secretary addresses an audience of international dignitaries.

The lord mayor takes part in major state occasions; for example, in 2013, the then-lord mayor, Sir Roger Gifford, carried the Mourning Sword at Margaret Thatcher's funeral, processing ahead of the Queen and Prince Philip, Duke of Edinburgh, into St Paul's Cathedral.

The lord mayor performs numerous other functions, including serving as the chief magistrate of the City of London, admiral of the Port of London, rector of City, University of London, president of Gresham College, president of City of London Reserve Forces and Cadets Association, and trustee of St Paul's Cathedral. The lord mayor also heads the City's Commission of Lieutenancy, which represents the sovereign in the City of London (other counties usually have lord lieutenants, as opposed to Commissions), and annually attends a meeting of the Treloar Trust (named after Sir William Treloar, lord mayor in 1906), in Hampshire. The Treloar Trust runs two educational sites for disabled children: a school and college.

== Rights and privileges ==
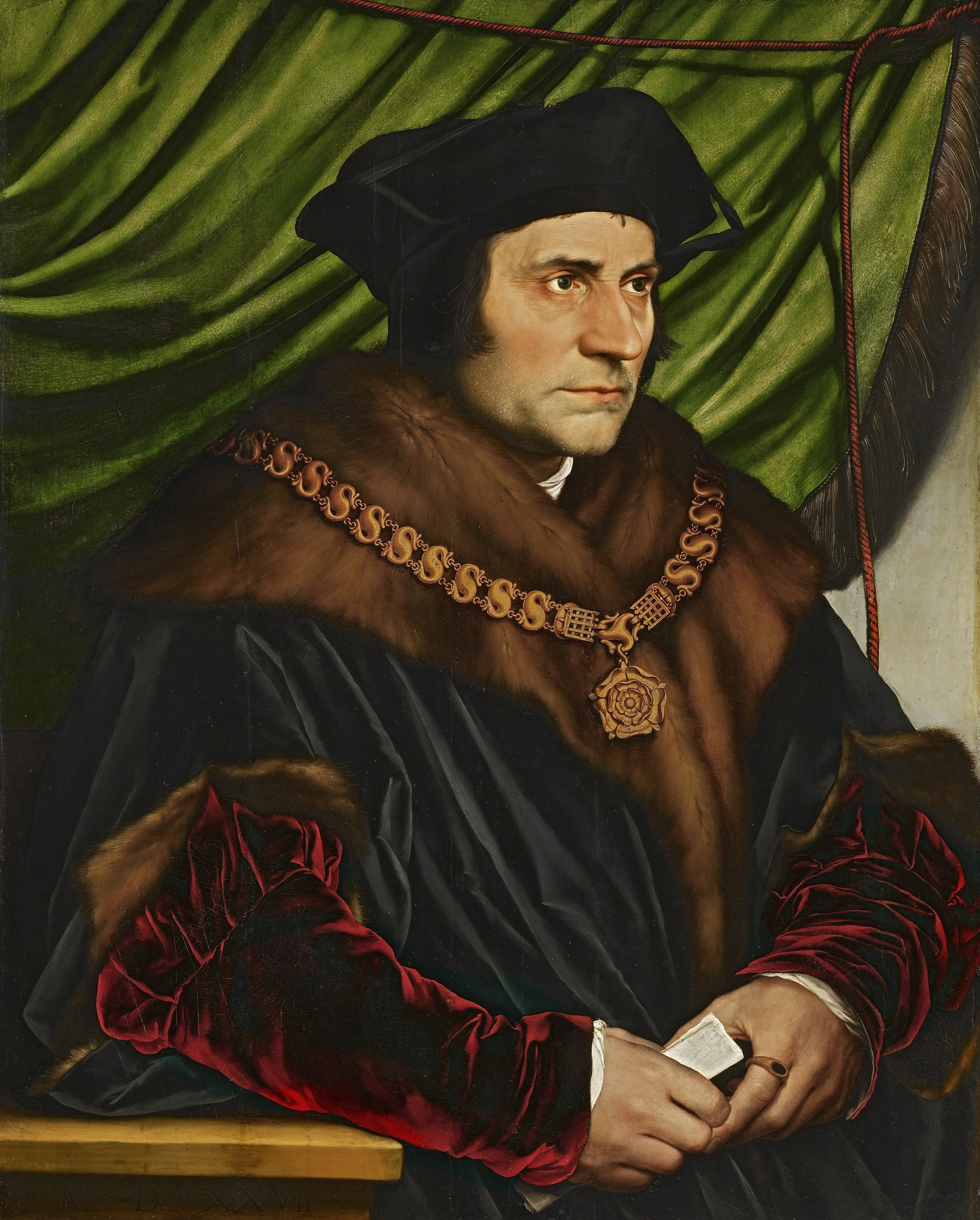
The lord mayor's Collar of Esses also used as the symbol of office by Lord Chancellor Sir Thomas More.

The residence of the lord mayor is known as the Mansion House. The establishment of the residence was considered after the Great Fire of London in 1666. Construction began in 1739. It was first occupied by a lord mayor in 1752, when Sir Crispin Gascoigne took up residence. The official car of the lord mayor is a Rolls-Royce Phantom VI with registration number LM 0.

In each of the eighteen courtrooms of the Old Bailey, the centre of the judges' bench is reserved for the lord mayor, as chief justice of the City of London. The presiding judge therefore sits to one side.

It is sometimes asserted that the lord mayor may exclude the monarch from the City of London. This legend is based on the misinterpretation of the ceremony observed each time the sovereign enters the City at Temple Bar, when the lord mayor presents the City's Pearl Sword to the sovereign as a symbol of the latter's overlordship. The monarch does not, as is often purported, wait for the lord mayor's permission to enter the City. When the sovereign enters the City, a short ceremony usually takes place where the lord mayor presents a sword to the monarch, symbolically surrendering their authority. If the sovereign is attending a service at St Paul's Cathedral this ceremony would take place there rather than at the boundary of the City, simply for convenience.

The importance of the office is reflected in the composition of the Accession Council, a body which proclaims the accession of new sovereigns. The Council includes the lord mayor and aldermen of London, as well as members of the House of Lords and privy councillors. At the coronation banquet which follows, the lord mayor has the right to assist the royal butler. The same privilege is held by the lord mayor of Oxford, while the mayor of Winchester may assist the royal cook. Such privileges have not been exercised since 1821, when the coronation banquet celebrating the coronation of George IV was last held.

== Official dress ==
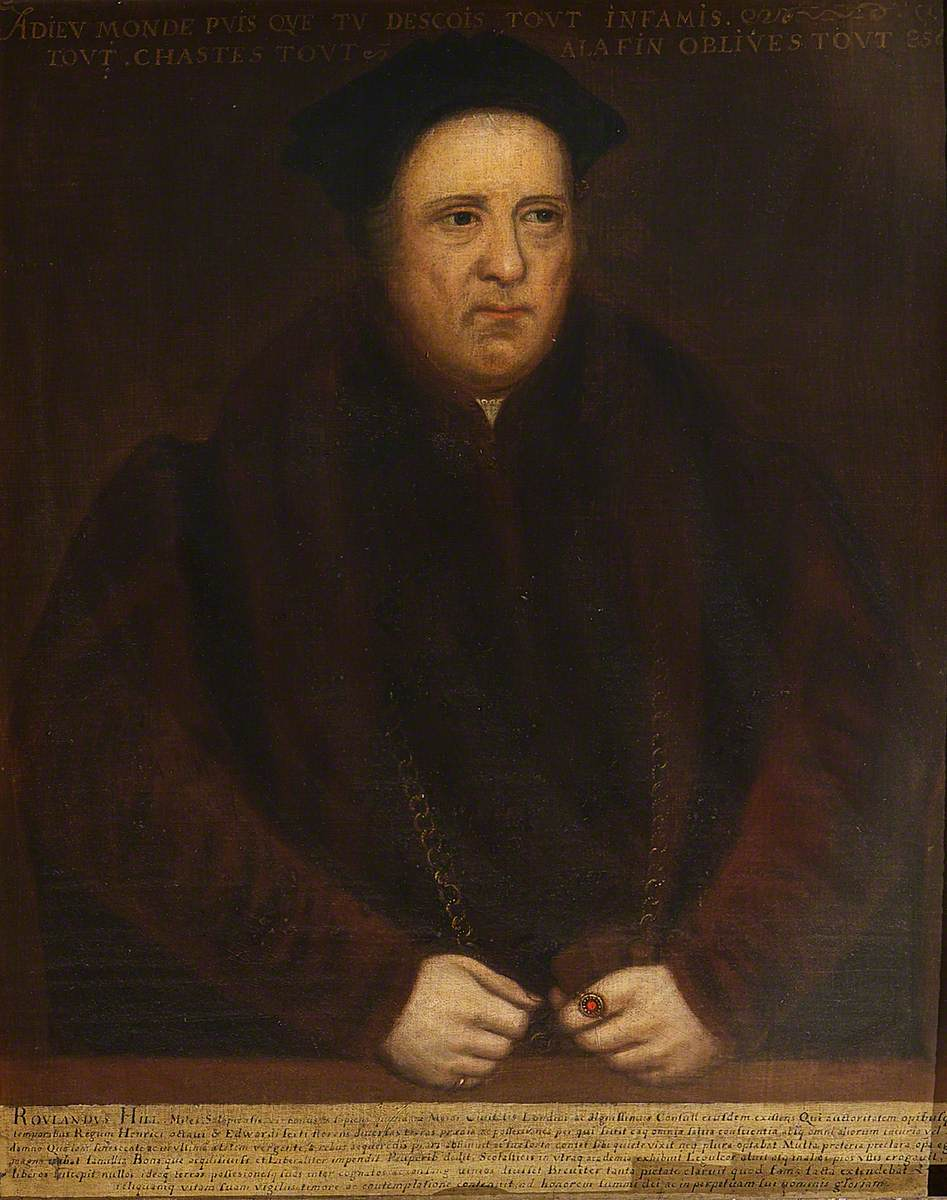
Sir Rowland Hill, who coordinated the Geneva Bible translation, wearing his lord mayor's chain of office in 1549

On formal occasions the lord mayor wears traditional black velvet court dress consisting of a coat, waistcoat and knee breeches with steel cut buttons. This is worn with black silk stockings, patent court shoes with steel buckles, a white shirt with lace cuffs and a large jabot stock. This form of court dress is worn by all lord mayors regardless of gender.

When outdoors, the lord mayor wears a black beaver plush tricorne hat trimmed with black ostrich feathers and a steel 'loop' for the cockade. Traditionally, this has been made by Patey's, and re-commissioned by the Worshipful Company of Feltmakers for each incumbent lord mayor.

Since 1545 the lord mayor has worn a Royal Livery Collar of Esses. The collar's origins are not royal, Sir John Alleyn, twice lord mayor, having bequeathed it to the next lord mayor and his successors "to use and occupie yerely at and uppon principall and festivall dayes". It was enlarged in 1567, and in its present shape has 28 Esses (the Lancastrian ‘S’), Tudor roses and the tasselled knots of the Garter (alternating) and also the Portcullis, from which hangs the Mayoral Jewel. The collar is worn over whatever the lord mayor may be wearing, secured onto their underdress or State Robes by means of black or white silk satin ribbons on the shoulders.

=== Robes ===
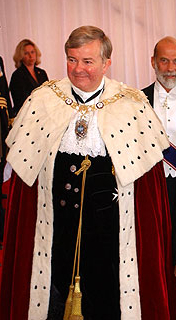
Lord Mayor Arthur wearing the state robe over court dress

As an alderman of the City of London the lord mayor has a scarlet gown and a violet gown, which are identical to those worn by their fellow aldermen except that they are trained. The violet robe is worn at most formal meetings of the Corporation with the scarlet robe substituted on certain days or occasions as directed by the City Ceremonial Book.

For state occasions when the monarch is present, the lord mayor wears a crimson velvet robe of state trimmed with an ermine cape and facings, similar to a royal earl's coronation robe. It is tied with gold cordons, and dates from the reign of George IV.

On other ceremonial occasions a black silk damask robe trimmed with gold lace is worn, of a design the same as that of the lord chancellor. This is known as the Entertaining Gown.

At coronations, the lord mayor wears a special coronation robe: a mantle of scarlet superfine wool trimmed with bars of gold lace and ermine and lined with white silk satin; they also carry the Crystal Sceptre as a baton of office. After the coronation, the incumbent may keep their coronation robe as a personal token.

A plain black gown is worn by the lord mayor in times of national mourning.

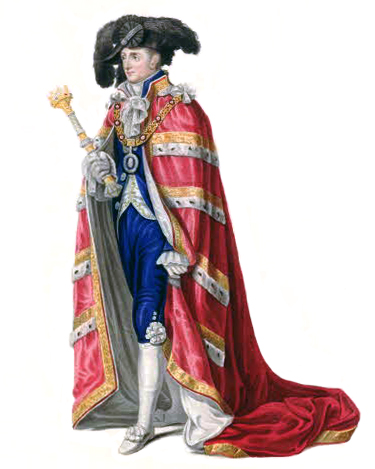
The lord mayor wearing the coronation robe and carrying the Crystal Sceptre at George IV's coronation

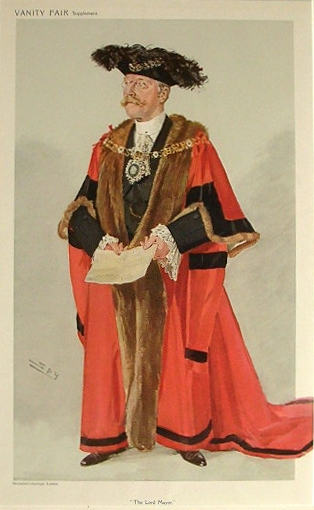
The scarlet robe, with train

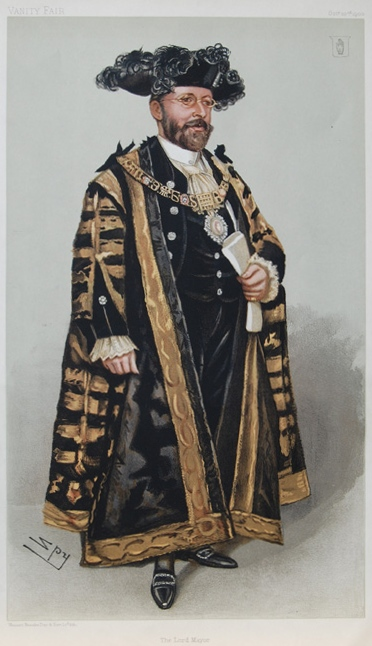
The Entertaining Robe

Lord Mayor Russell's personal arms

Lord Mayor Mainelli's personal arms

== See also ==
- Mayor of London
- Sheriff of London
- Town Clerk of London
- Chamberlain of London
- City status in the United Kingdom
- List of lord mayoralties and lord provostships in the United Kingdom
- Lord Mayor of Dublin
