= Court of assistants =

A court of assistants is a council of members of a professional, trade, craft or livery company or association, which typically plays a role in the governance of the organisation.

The term originated among the London livery companies, referring to "certain senior members who manage the affairs of the City of London Companies", but it may also be used by other trade associations.

A court of assistants usually has authority and acts as the governing body of such organisations. It may include officials, as in the case of the Court of Assistants of the Worshipful Company of Clockmakers, founded in 1631: "The governing body of the Company is the Court of Assistants, comprising the Master, three Wardens and not less than ten Assistants."

Another example is the Honourable Artillery Company, which has an Annual General Court (open to all members) to elect 20 Assistants who then serve on the court of assistants. In arrangements which date to 1633, the company is thence governed in its civil and financial affairs by the Court of Assistants.
