= List of lord mayors of London =

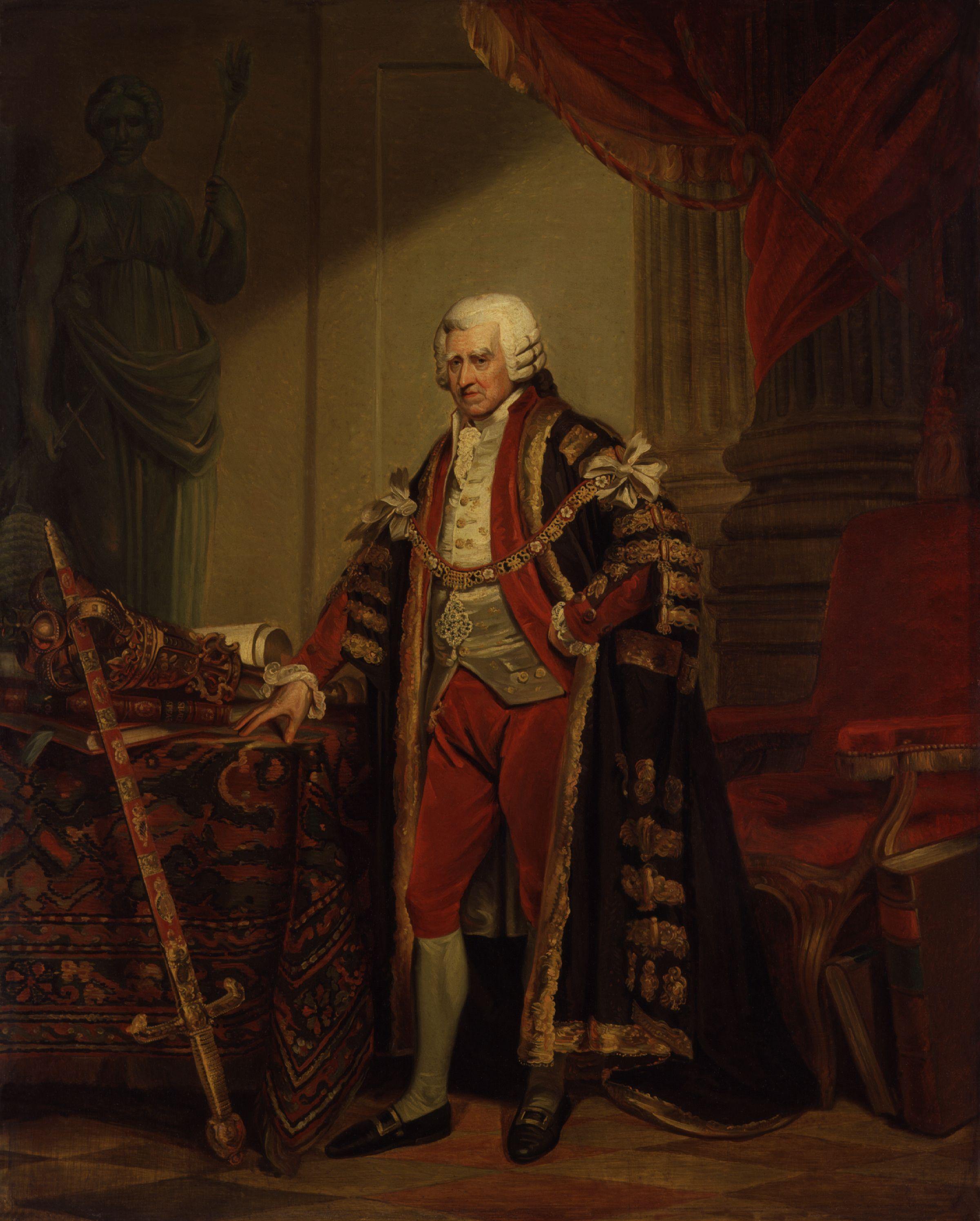
John Boydell, the lord mayor of London in 1790. Portrait of John Boydell by William Beechey

This is a list of all mayors and lord/lady mayors of London (leaders of the City of London Corporation, and first citizens of the City of London). Until 1354, the title held was mayor of London. The dates are those of being elected to office on 29 September, excepting those years when it fell on the Sabbath; the office is not actually entered until the second week of November. Therefore, the years elected below do not represent the main calendar year of service. In 2006, the title Lord Mayor of the City of London was devised, for the most part, to avoid confusion with the office of mayor of London. However, the legal and commonly used title and style remains Lord/Lady Mayor of London.

== Mayors ==
This list details which livery company each Lord Mayor was associated with.

=== Before 1300 ===
Term	Name	Mother Livery Company	Notes
1189–1212	Henry FitzAilwin	(Draper) (Note: The Drapers are recognised as having formed a fraternity from 1180, were incorporated in 1361, and received a Royal Charter in 1438.)	First Mayor of London. Died in his twenty-fourth term.
1212–1214	Roger FitzAlan	(Mercer) (Note: The Mercers incorporated under Royal Charter in 1394.)	
1214	Serlo le Mercer	(Mercer)	First of five terms.
1215	William Hardell	(Draper)	
1216	Jacob Alderman	unknown	Served until Trinity Sunday, when he died in office. His successor served as Mayor for the rest of the year.
1216	Salomon de Basing	unknown	Succeeded Jacob Alderman on or shortly after Trinity Sunday, and continued in office till the end of the year.
1217–1221	Serlo le Mercer	(Mercer)	Second to fifth terms of five.
1222–1226	Richard Renger	unknown	First five terms of six.
1227–1230	Roger le Duke	unknown	Four terms.
1231–1237	Andrew Buckerell	(Pepperer) (Note: The Grocers were known as the Guild of Pepperers from 1180 until 1373, and incorporated under a Royal Charter of 1428.)	Seven terms; died in office
1237-1238	Richard Renger	unknown	Sixth and final term; died in office
1238-1239	William Joynier	unknown	
1239-1240	Gerard Bat	unknown	First term began 13 Jan 1239. Re-elected but not admitted to office in 1240
1240	Reginald de Bungay	unknown	
1241–1243	Ralph Ashley	(Mercer)	Three terms. Was a Grocer when Sheriff. Also "Eswy"
1244–1245	Michael Tovey	unknown	First and second terms of four.
1246	John Gisors I	(Pepperer)	First of two terms.
1246	Peter FitzAlan	unknown	
1247–1248	Michael Tovey	unknown	Third and fourth terms of four.
1249	Roger FitzRoger	unknown	
1250	John le Norman	unknown	
1251	Adam de Basing	(Mercer)	
1252	John Tulesan	(Draper)	
1253	Nicholas de La Beche	unknown	
1254–1257	Ralph Hardell	(Draper)	Served four terms; deposed.
1258	William FitzRichard	(Draper)	First of four terms as Royal Nominee.
1258	John Gisors	(Pepperer)	Second of two terms.
1259–1260	William FitzRichard	(Draper)	Second and third terms of four as Royal Nominee.
1261–1264	Thomas Fitzthomas	unknown	Four terms; deposed and imprisoned.
1265	Hugh FitzOtho	n/a	First of two terms as Royal Warden.
1265	John Walerand	n/a	Royal Warden.
1265	John de La Lynde	n/a	Royal Warden.
1266	William FitzRichard	(Draper)	Fourth and final term as Royal Nominee.
1267	Alan la Zouche	(Pepperer)	Royal Warden.
1268	Thomas de Ippegrave	n/a	Royal Warden.
1268	Stephen de Eddeworth	n/a	Royal Warden.
1269	Hugh FitzOtho	n/a	Second of two terms as Royal Warden.
1270	John Adrien	(Draper)	
1271–1272	Walter Hervey	unknown	Two terms; deposed.
1273	Henry le Walleis	unknown	First of five terms.
1274–1280	Gregory de Rokesley	(Goldsmith) (Note: The Goldsmiths formed as a guild in the 12th century and received their first Royal Charter of Incorporation in 1327.)	First seven terms of eight.
1281–1283	Henry le Walleis	unknown	Second to fourth of five terms.
1284	Gregory de Rokesley	(Goldsmith)	Eighth and final term.
1285–1289	Sir Ralph Sandwich	n/a	First five terms of nine as Royal Warden.
1289	John le Breton	n/a	First of seven terms as Royal Warden.
1289–1292	Sir Ralph Sandwich	n/a	Sixth to ninth terms as Royal Warden.
1293–1298	John le Breton	n/a	Second to seventh terms of seven as Royal Warden.
1298	Henry le Wallis	unknown	Fifth and final term.
1299–1301	Elias Russell	(Draper)	

=== 14th century ===
Elected	Name	Mother Livery Company	Notes
1301–1307	Sir John le Blund	(Draper) (Note: The Drapers are recorded as forming a fraternity by 1180, were formally incorporated in 1361, but did not receive a Royal Charter until 1438.)	
1308	Sir Nicholas de Farndone	(Goldsmith) (Note: The Goldsmiths originated in the 12th century, but did not receive a Royal Charter until 1327.)	First of four terms.
1309	Thomas Romayn	(Pepperer) (Note: The Grocers were the Guild of Pepperers from 1180 until 1373, but did not incorporate under Royal Charter until 1428.)	
1310	Sir Richard de Refham	(Mercer) (Note: The Mercers incorporated under Royal Charter in 1394.)	Deposed.
1311–1312	Sir John de Gisors	(Pepperer)	First and second terms of three.
1313	Sir Nicholas de Farndone	(Goldsmith)	Second of four terms.
1314	Sir John de Gisors	(Pepperer)	Third and final term.
1315	Stephen de Abyngdon	(Draper)	
1316–1318	Sir John de Wengrave	n/a	Royal Warden; two terms.
1319	Sir Hamo de Chigwell	Fishmonger	First of seven terms.
1320	Sir Nicholas de Farndone	(Goldsmith)	Third of four terms.
1321	Robert de Kendale	n/a	Royal Warden
1321–1322	Sir Hamo de Chigwell	Fishmonger	Second and third of seven terms.
1323	Sir Nicholas de Farndone	(Goldsmith)	Fourth and final term.
1323–1325	Sir Hamo de Chigwell	Fishmonger	Fourth to sixth terms of seven.
1326	Sir Richard de Betoyne	(Pepperer)	
1327	Sir Hamo de Chigwell	Fishmonger	Seventh and final term.
1328	Sir John de Grantham	(Pepperer)	
1329	Sir Simon Swanland	(Draper)	
1330–1331	Sir John de Pulteney	(Draper)	First and second of four terms.
1332	Sir John de Preston	(Draper)	
1333	Sir John de Pulteney	(Draper)	Third of four terms.
1334–1335	Sir Reginald de Conduit	(Vintner) (Note: The Vintners probably originated in the 12th century, but did not receive a Royal Charter until 1364.)	Two terms.
1336	Sir John de Pulteney	(Draper)	Fourth and final term.
1337–1338	Sir Henry Darcy	(Draper)	Two terms.
1339–1340	Sir Andrew d'Aubrey	(Pepperer)	First and second of three terms.
1341	John d'Oxenford	(Vintner)	Died in office.
1342	Simon Francis	(Mercer)	First of two terms; the latter was in 1355 as Lord Mayor.
1343–1344	Sir John Hammond	(Pepperer)	Two terms.
1345	Richard le Lacer	(Mercer)	
1346	Sir Geoffrey de Wychingham	(Mercer)	
1347	Sir Thomas Legge	Skinner	First of two terms; the latter was in 1354 as the first Lord Mayor.
1348	Sir John Lovekyn	Fishmonger	First of three terms; the latter two were Lord Mayorships.
1349	Sir Walter Turke	Fishmonger	
1350	Richard de Kislingbury	(Draper)	
1351	Sir Andrew d'Aubrey	(Pepperer)	Third and final term.
1352–1353	Sir Adam Fraunceys	(Mercer)	Two terms.

== Lord mayors ==
=== 14th century ===
Elected	Name	Mother Livery Company	Notes
1354	Sir Thomas Legge	Skinner	First Lord Mayor of London. Second of two terms, having initially served as Mayor of London.
1355	Simon Fraunceys	(Mercer) (Note: The Mercers incorporated under Royal Charter in 1394.)	Second of two terms, having initially served as Mayor of London.
1356	Sir Henry Picard	(Vintner) (Note: The Vintners probably originated in the 12th century, but did not receive a Royal Charter until 1364.)	
1357	John de Stodeye	(Vintner)	
1358	Sir John Lovekyn	Fishmonger	Second of three terms, having initially served as Mayor of London.
1359	Simon Dolseley	(Pepperer) (Note: The Grocers were the Guild of Pepperers from 1180 until 1373, but did not incorporate under Royal Charter until 1428.)	
1360	Sir John Wroth	Fishmonger	
1361	Sir John Pecche	Fishmonger	
1362	Stephen Cavendisshe	(Draper) (Note: The Drapers are recorded as forming a fraternity by 1180, were formally incorporated in 1361, but did not receive a Royal Charter until 1438.)	
1363	John Nott	(Pepperer)	
1364–1365	Sir Adam de Bury	Skinner	First two terms of three; impeached.
1366	Sir John Lovekyn	Fishmonger	Third and final term.
1367	James Andrewes	(Draper)	
1368	Simon de Montfort	Fishmonger	
1369	Sir John de Chichester	Goldsmith	
1370–1371	Sir John Bernes	(Mercer)	Two terms.
1372	John Pyel	(Mercer)	
1373	Sir Adam de Bury	Skinner	Third and final term.
1374	Sir William Walworth	Fishmonger	First of two terms.
1375	John Warde	Grocer	
1376	Adam Stable	(Mercer)	
1377	Sir Nicholas Brembre	Grocer	First of four terms.
1378	Sir John Philpot	Grocer	
1379	John Hadley	Grocer	First of two terms.
1380	Sir William Walworth	Fishmonger	Second of two terms.
1381–1382	John de Northampton	(Draper)	Two terms.
1383–1385	Sir Nicholas Brembre	Grocer	Second to fourth terms of four.
1386–1387	Sir Nicholas Exton	Fishmonger	Two terms.
1388	Sir Nicholas Twyford	Goldsmith	
1389	William Venour	Grocer	
1390	Adam Bamme	Goldsmith	First of two terms.
1391	Sir John Hende	(Draper)	First of two terms; deposed and imprisoned.
1392	Sir Edward Dalyngrigge	n/a	Royal Warden.
1392	Sir Baldwin Radyngton	knight	Royal Warden.
1392	Sir William de Staunton	Grocer	First of two terms.
1393	John Hadley	Grocer	Second of two terms.
1394	John Fresshe	Mercer	
1395	Sir William More	Vintner	
1396	Adam Bamme	Goldsmith	Second of two term; died in office.
1397	Sir Richard Whittington	Mercer	First of four terms; appointed by Richard II.
1397	Sir Richard Whittington	Mercer	Second of four terms; elected.
1398	Sir Drugo Barentyn	Goldsmith	First of two terms.
1399	Sir Thomas Knollys	Grocer	First of two terms.
1400	John Fraunceys	Goldsmith	

=== 15th century ===
Elected	Name	Mother Livery Company	Notes
1401	John Shadworth	Mercer	
1402	John Walcote	(Draper) (Note: The Drapers are recorded as forming a fraternity by 1180, were formally incorporated in 1361, but did not receive a Royal Charter until 1438.)	
1403	William Little	Fishmonger	
1404	Sir John Hende	(Draper)	Second of two terms.
1405	Sir John Woodcock	Mercer	
1406	Sir Richard Whittington	Mercer	Third of four terms.
1407	Sir William de Staunton	(Grocer) (Note: The Grocers did not incorporate under Royal Charter until 1428.)	Second of two terms.
1408	Sir Drugo Barentyn	Goldsmith	Second of two terms.
1409	Sir Richard Marlowe	(Ironmonger) (Note: The Ironmongers did not incorporate under Royal Charter until 1463.)	First of two terms.
1410	Sir Thomas Knollys	(Grocer)	Second of two terms.
1411	Sir Robert Chichele	(Grocer)	First of two terms.
1412	Sir William Walderne	Mercer	First of two terms.
1413	Sir William Cromer	(Draper)	First of two terms.
1414	Sir Thomas Fauconer	Mercer	
1415	Sir Nicholas Wotton	(Draper)	First of two terms.
1416	Sir Henry Barton	Skinner	First of two terms.
1417	Sir Richard Marlowe	(Ironmonger)	Second of two terms.
1418	Sir William Sevenoke	(Grocer)	
1419	Sir Richard Whittington	Mercer	Fourth and final term.
1420	Sir William de Cambridge	(Grocer)	
1421	Sir Robert Chichele	(Grocer)	Second of two terms.
1422	Sir William Walderne	Mercer	Second of two terms.
1423	Sir William Cromer	(Draper)	Second of two terms.
1424	Sir John Michell	Fishmonger	First of two terms.
1425	Sir John Coventry	Mercer	
1426	Sir John Reynwell	Fishmonger	
1427	Sir John Gedney	(Draper)	First of two terms.
1428	Sir Henry Barton	Skinner	Second of two terms.
1429	Sir William Eastfeld	Mercer	First of two terms.
1430	Sir Nicholas Wotton	(Draper)	Second of two terms.
1431	Sir John Welles	Grocer	
1432	Sir John Verney	Fishmonger	
1433	Sir John Brokley	(Draper)	
1434	Sir Robert Ottele	Grocer	
1435	Sir Henry Frowick	Mercer	First of two terms.
1436	Sir John Michell	Fishmonger	Second of two terms.
1437	Sir William Eastfeld	Mercer	Second of two terms.
1438	Sir Stephen Browne	Grocer	First of two terms.
1439	Robert Large	Mercer	
1440	Sir John Paulet	Goldsmith	
1441	Sir Robert Clopton	Draper	
1442	Sir John Atherley	(Ironmonger)	
1443	Sir Thomas Catworth	Grocer	
1444	Sir Henry Frowick	Mercer	Second of two terms.
1445	Sir Simon Eyre	Draper	
1446	Sir John Olney	Mercer	
1447	Sir John Gedney	Draper	Second of two terms.
1448	Sir Stephen Browne	Grocer	Second of two terms.
1449	Sir Thomas Chalton	Mercer	
1450	Sir Nicholas Wyfold	Grocer	
1451	Sir William Gregory	Skinner	
1452	Sir Geoffrey Fielding	Mercer	
1453	Sir John Norman	Draper	
1454	Sir Stephen Foster	Fishmonger	
1455	Sir William Marlowe	Grocer	
1456	Sir Thomas Canynges	Grocer	
1457	Sir Geoffrey Boleyn	Mercer	
1458	Sir Thomas Scott	Draper	
1459	Sir William Hewlyn	Fishmonger	
1460	Sir Richard Leigh	Grocer	First of two terms.
1461	Sir Hugh Wyche	Mercer	
1462	Sir Thomas Cooke	Draper	
1463	Sir Matthew Phillip	Goldsmith	
1464	Sir Ralph Josselyn	Draper	First of two terms.
1465	Sir Ralph Verney	Mercer	
1466	Sir John Yonge	Grocer	Half-brother of Sir William Canynges.
1467	Sir Thomas Walgrave	Skinner	
1468	Sir William Taylour	Grocer	
1469	Sir Richard Leigh	Grocer	Second of two terms.
1470	Sir John Stockton	Mercer	
1471	William Edwardes	Grocer	
1472	Sir William Hampton	Fishmonger	
1473	Sir John Tate	Mercer	Uncle of Sir Robert Tate (1488) and Sir John Tate (1496, 1514).
1474	Sir Robert Drope	Draper	
1475	Sir Robert Basset	Salter	
1476	Sir Ralph Josselyn	Draper	Second of two terms.
1477	Sir Humphrey Heyford	Goldsmith	
1478	Sir Richard Gardiner	Mercer	
1479	Sir Bartholomew James	Draper	
1480	Sir John Browne	Mercer	Uncle of Sir William Browne (1513)
1481	Sir William Harryot	Draper	
1482	Sir Edmund Shaa	Goldsmith	
1483	Sir Robert Billesdon	Haberdasher (Note: The Haberdashers are on record as having formed a fraternity before 1371 and first received a Royal Charter in 1448.)	
1484	Sir Thomas Hill	Grocer	Died in office.
1485	Sir William Stoker	Draper	Died in office.
1485	Sir John Warde	Grocer	
1485	Sir Hugh Bryce	Grocer	
1486	Sir Henry Colet	Mercer	First of two terms.
1487	Sir William Horne	Salter	
1488	Sir Robert Tate	Mercer	Brother of Sir John Tate (1496, 1514); nephew of Sir John Tate (1473).
1489	Sir William White	Draper	
1490	Sir John Mathew	Mercer	
1491	Sir Hugh Clopton	Mercer	
1492	Sir William Martyn	Skinner	
1493	Sir Ralph Astley	Fishmonger	
1494	Sir Richard Chawry	Salter	
1495	Sir Henry Colet	Mercer	Second of two terms.
1496	Sir John Tate	Mercer	First of two terms. Brother of Sir Robert Tate (1488); nephew of Sir John Tate (1473).
1497	Sir William Purchas	Mercer	
1498	Sir John Percival	Merchant Taylor	
1499	Nicholas Ailwyn	Mercer	Died in office.
1500	Sir William Remyngton	Fishmonger	

=== 16th century ===
Elected	Name	Mother Livery Company	Notes
1501	Sir John Shaw	Goldsmith	
1502	Sir Bartholomew Reade	Goldsmith	
1503	Sir William Capell	Draper	First of two terms.
1504	Sir John Wyngar	Grocer	
1505	Sir Thomas Kneesworth	Fishmonger	
1506	Sir Richard Haddon	Mercer	First of two terms.
1507	Sir William Browne	Mercer	Uncle of Sir William Browne (1514); died in office.
1508	Sir Lawrence Aylmer	Merchant Taylor	
1508	Sir Stephen Jenyns	Merchant Taylor	
1509	Sir Thomas Bradbury	Mercer	
1510	Sir William Capell	Draper	Second of two terms.
1510	Sir Henry Keble	Grocer	
1511	Sir Roger Ashley	Draper	
1512	Sir William Copinger	Fishmonger	
1513	Sir Richard Haddon	Mercer	Second of two terms.
1513	Sir William Browne	Mercer	Nephew of Sir William Browne (1507); died in office.
1514	Sir John Tate	Mercer	Second of two terms.
1514	Sir George Monoux	Draper	
1515	Sir William Butler	Grocer	
1516	John Rest	Grocer	
1517	Sir Thomas Exmewe	Goldsmith	
1518	Sir Thomas Mirfyn	Skinner	
1519	Sir James Yarford	Mercer	
1520	Sir John Brydges	Draper	Born Brugge; also "Bridges. Father in law of Richard Sackville.
1521	Sir John Milburne	Draper	
1522	Sir John Mundy	Goldsmith	
1523	Sir Thomas Baldry	Mercer	
1524	Sir William Bailey	Draper	
1525	Sir John Alleyn	Mercer	First of two terms.
1526	Sir Thomas Seymour, MP	Mercer	
1527	Sir James Spencer	Vintner	
1528	Sir John Rudston	Draper	
1529	Sir Ralph Dodmer	Brewer	
1530	Sir Thomas Pargiter	Salter	
1531	Sir Nicholas Lombard	Grocer	
1532	Sir Stephen Peacock	Haberdasher	
1533	Sir Christopher Askew	Draper	
1534	Sir John Champneys	Skinner	
1535	Sir John Alleyn	Mercer	Second of two terms.
1536	Sir Ralph Warren	Mercer	First of two terms.
1537	Sir Richard Gresham	Mercer	
1538	Sir William Forman	Haberdasher	
1539	Sir William Holles	Mercer	
1540	Sir William Roche	Draper	
1541	Sir Michael Dormer	Mercer	
1542	Sir John Coates	Salter	
1543	Sir William Bowyer	Draper	Died in office
1544	Sir Ralph Warren	Mercer	2nd term: completed Bowyer's term.
1544	Sir William Laxton	Grocer	
1545	Sir Martin Bowes	Goldsmith	
1546	Sir Henry Huberthorn	Merchant Taylor	
1547	Sir John Gresham	Mercer	
1548	Sir Henry Amcotes	Fishmonger	
1549	Sir Rowland Hill	Mercer	
1550	Sir Andrew Judd	Skinner	
1551	Sir Richard Dobbs	Skinner	
1552	Sir George Barne	Haberdasher	Father of George Barne III (1586)
1553	Sir Thomas White	Merchant Taylor	
1554	Sir John Lyon or Lyons	Grocer	First cousin of John Lyon (d. 1592) who was the founder of Harrow School
1555	Sir William Garrard	Haberdasher	
1556	Sir Thomas Offley	Merchant Taylor	
1557	Sir Thomas Curtis	Fishmonger	Previously Pewterer.
1558	Sir Thomas Leigh	Mercer	
1559	Sir William Hewett	Clothworker	
1560	Sir William Chester	Draper	
1561	Sir William Harpur	Merchant Taylor	
1562	Sir Thomas Lodge	Grocer	
1563	Sir John Whyte	Grocer	
1564	Sir Richard Mallory	Mercer	Ancestor of the Leigh-Mallory family.
1565	Sir Richard Champion	Draper	
1566	Sir Christopher Draper	Ironmonger	
1567	Sir Roger Martyn	Mercer	
1568	Sir Thomas Rowe	Merchant Taylor	
1569	Sir Alexander Avenon	Ironmonger	
1570	Sir Rowland Hayward	Clothworker	First of two terms.
1571	Sir William Allen	Mercer	Grandfather of Mary Box school founder
1572	Sir Lionel Duckett	Mercer	
1573	Sir John Rivers	Grocer	
1574	Sir James Hawes	Clothworker	
1575	Sir Ambrose Nicholas	Salter	
1576	Sir John Langley	Goldsmith	
1577	Sir Thomas Ramsey	Grocer	
1578	Sir Richard Pype	Draper	
1579	Sir Nicholas Woodroffe	Haberdasher	
1580	Sir John Branche	Draper	
1581	Sir James Harvey	Ironmonger	
1582	Sir Thomas Blanke	Haberdasher	
1583	Sir Edward Osborne	Clothworker	
1584	Sir Thomas Pullyson	Draper	
1585	Sir Wolstan Dixie	Skinner	
1586	Sir George Barne, MP	Haberdasher	Son of George Barne II (1552)
1587	Sir George Bond	Haberdasher	
1588	Sir Martin Calthrop	Draper	Died in office
1589	Sir Richard Martin	Goldsmith	First term, completing the term of Sir Martin Calthorpe.
1589	Sir John Harte	Grocer	
1590	Sir John Allot	Fishmonger	Died in office.
1591	Sir Rowland Heyward	Clothworker	Second of two terms.
1591	Sir William Webbe	Salter	
1592	Sir William Rowe	Ironmonger	
1593	Sir Cuthbert Buckell	Vintner	Died in office.
1594	Sir Richard Martin	Goldsmith	Second of two terms, completing that of Sir Cuthbert Buckle.
1594	Sir John Spencer	Clothworker	
1595	Sir Stephen Slaney	Skinner	
1596	Thomas Skinner	Clothworker	Died in office.
1596	Sir Henry Billingsley	Haberdasher	
1597	Richard Saltonstall, MP	Skinner	Uncle of Sir Richard Saltonstall.
1598	Sir Stephen Soame	Grocer	
1599	Nicholas Mosley	Clothworker	
1600	Sir William Ryder	Haberdasher	

=== 17th century ===
Elected	Name	Mother Livery Company	Notes
1601	Sir John Gerard	Haberdasher	
1602	Sir Robert Lee	Merchant Taylor	
1603	Sir Thomas Bennet	Mercer	
1604	Sir Thomas Lowe	Haberdasher	
1605	Sir Leonard Halliday	Merchant Taylor	
1606	Sir John Watts	Clothworker	
1607	Sir Henry Rowe	Mercer	
1608	Sir Humphrey Weld	Grocer	
1609	Sir Thomas Cambell	Ironmonger	
1610	Sir William Craven	Merchant Taylor	
1611	Sir James Pemberton	Goldsmith	
1612	Sir John Swynnerton	Merchant Taylor	
1613	Sir Thomas Myddelton	Grocer	
1614	Sir Thomas Hayes	Draper	
1615	Sir John Jolles	Draper	
1616	Sir John Leman	Fishmonger	
1617	Sir George Bolles	Grocer	
1618	Sir Sebastian Hervey	Ironmonger	
1619	Sir William Cockayne	Skinner	
1620	Sir Francis Jones	Haberdasher	
1621	Sir Edward Barkham	Draper	
1622	Sir Peter Proby	Grocer	
1623	Sir Martin Lumley	Draper	
1624	Sir John Gore	Merchant Taylor	
1625	Sir Allen Cotton	Draper	
1626	Sir Cuthbert Hacket	Draper	
1627	Sir Hugh Hamersley	Haberdasher	
1628	Sir Richard Deane	Skinner	
1629	Sir James Cambell	Ironmonger	
1630	Sir Robert Ducie, 1st Baronet	Merchant Taylor	
1631	Sir George Whitmore	Haberdasher	
1632	Sir Nicholas Rainton	Haberdasher	
1633	Sir Ralph Freeman	Clothworker	Died in office.
1634	Sir Thomas Moulson	Grocer	
1634	Sir Robert Parkhurst	Clothworker	
1635	Sir Christopher Clitherow	Ironmonger	
1636	Sir Edward Bromfield	Fishmonger	
1637	Sir Richard Fenn	Haberdasher	
1638	Sir Maurice Abbot	Draper	
1639	Sir Henry Garraway	Draper	
1640	Sir William Acton, 1st Baronet	Merchant Taylor	Elected, but displaced by Parliament.
1640	Sir Edmund Wright	Grocer	
1641	Sir Richard Gurney, 1st Baronet	Clothworker	
1642	Sir Isaac Penington	Fishmonger	
1643	Sir John Wollaston	Goldsmith	
1644	Sir Thomas Atkins	Mercer	
1645	Sir Thomas Adams, 1st Baronet	Draper	
1646	Sir John Gayre	Fishmonger	
1647	Sir John Warner, 1st Baronet	Grocer	
1648	Sir Abraham Reynardson	Merchant Taylor	Deposed April 1649.
1649	Sir Thomas Andrewes	Leatherseller	
1649	Sir Thomas Foote, 1st Baronet	Grocer	
1650	Sir Thomas Andrewes	Leatherseller	
1651	Sir John Kendrick	Grocer	
1652	John Fowke MP	Haberdasher	
1653	Sir Thomas Vyner, 1st Baronet	Goldsmith	
1654	Sir Christopher Packe	Draper	
1655	Sir John Dethick	Mercer	
1656	Sir Robert Tichborne	Skinner	
1657	Sir Richard Chiverton	Skinner	
1658	Sir John Ireton	Clothworker	
1659	Sir Thomas Allen, 1st Baronet	Grocer	
1660	Sir Richard Browne, 1st Baronet	Merchant Taylor	
1661	Sir John Frederick	Grocer	
1662	Sir John Robinson, 1st Baronet	Clothworker	
1663	Sir Anthony Bateman	Skinner	
1664	Sir John Lawrence	Haberdasher	
1665	Sir Thomas Bloodworth	Vintner	
1666	Sir William Bolton	Merchant Taylor	
1667	Sir William Peake	Clothworker	
1668	Sir William Turner	Merchant Taylor	
1669	Sir Samuel Starling	Brewer	
1670	Sir Richard Ford	Mercer	
1671	Sir George Waterman	Skinner	
1672	Sir Robert Hanson	Grocer	
1673	Sir William Hooker	Grocer	
1674	Sir Robert Viner, 1st Baronet	Goldsmith	
1675	Sir Joseph Sheldon	Tallow Chandler	
1676	Sir Thomas Davies	Stationer	
1677	Sir Francis Chaplin	Clothworker	
1678	Sir James Edwards	Grocer	
1679	Sir Robert Clayton	Scrivener	
1680	Sir Patience Ward	Merchant Taylor	
1681	Sir John Moore	Grocer	
1682	Sir William Prichard	Merchant Taylor	
1683	Sir Henry Tulse	Grocer	
1684	Sir James Smyth	Draper	
1685	Sir Robert Geffrye	Ironmonger	
1686	Sir John Peake	Mercer	
1687	Sir John Shorter	Goldsmith	Died in office after a fall from his horse.
1688	Sir John Eyles	Mercer	
1688	Sir John Chapman	Haberdasher	
1689- 1690	Sir Thomas Pilkington	Skinner	
1691	Sir Thomas Stampe	Draper	
1692	Sir John Fleet	Grocer	
1693	Sir William Ashhurst	Merchant Taylor	
1694	Sir Thomas Lane	Clothworker	
1695	Sir John Houblon	Grocer	
1696	Sir Edward Clarke	Merchant Taylor	
1697	Sir Humphrey Edwin	Skinner	Previously Barber-Surgeon
1698	Sir Francis Child	Goldsmith	
1699	Sir Richard Levett	Haberdasher	
1700	Sir Thomas Abney	Fishmonger	

=== 18th century ===
Elected	Name	Mother Livery Company	Notes
1701	Sir William Gore	Mercer	
1702	Sir Samuel Dashwood	Vintner	
1703	Sir John Parsons	Brewer	Father of Humphrey Parsons (1730).
1704	Sir Owen Buckingham	Salter	
1705	Sir Thomas Rawlinson	Vintner	
1706	Sir Robert Bedingfield	Merchant Taylor	
1707	Sir William Withers	Fishmonger	
1708	Sir Charles Duncombe	Goldsmith	
1709	Sir Samuel Garrard, 4th Baronet	Grocer	
1710	Sir Gilbert Heathcote, 1st Baronet	Vintner	
1711	Sir Robert Beachcroft	Clothworker	
1712	Sir Richard Hoare	Goldsmith	
1713	Sir Samuel Stanier	Draper	
1714	Sir William Humfreys, 1st Baronet	Ironmonger	
1715	Sir Charles Peers	Salter	
1716	Sir James Bateman	Fishmonger	Previously Loriner.
1717	Sir William Lewen	Haberdasher	
1718	Sir John Ward	Merchant Taylor	
1719	Sir George Thorold, 1st Baronet	Ironmonger	
1720	Sir John Fryer, 1st Baronet	Fishmonger	Previously Pewterer.
1721	Sir William Stewart	Goldsmith	Previously Barber-Surgeon.
1722	Sir Gerard Conyers	Salter	
1723	Sir Peter Delmé	Fishmonger	
1724	Sir George Merttins	Skinner	Previously Clockmaker.
1725	Sir Francis Forbes	Haberdasher	
1726	Sir John Eyles, 2nd Baronet	Haberdasher	
1727	Sir Edward Becher	Draper	
1728	Sir Robert Baylis	Grocer	
1729	Sir Richard Brocas	Grocer	
1730	Humphrey Parsons	Grocer	First of two terms. Was the son of Sir John Parsons (1703).
1731	Sir Francis Child	Goldsmith	
1732	John Barber	Goldsmith	Previously Stationer.
1733	Sir William Billers	Haberdasher	
1734	Sir Edward Bellamy	Fishmonger	
1735	Sir John Williams	Mercer	
1736	Sir John Thompson	Vintner	
1737	Sir John Barnard	Grocer	
1738	Micajah Perry, MP	Haberdasher	
1739	Sir John Salter	Merchant Taylor	
1740	Humphrey Parsons	Grocer	Second of two terms; died in office.
1741	Sir Daniel Lambert	Ironmonger	Previously Cooper.
1741	Sir Robert Godschall	Vintner	
1742	George Heathcote, MP	Salter	
1742	Sir Robert Willimot	Cooper	
1743	Sir Robert Westley	Merchant Taylor	
1744	Sir Henry Marshall	Draper	
1745	Sir Richard Hoare	Goldsmith	
1746	William Benn	Fletcher	
1747	Sir Robert Ladbroke	Grocer	
1748	Sir William Calvert	Brewer	
1749	Sir Samuel Pennant	Ironmonger	Died in office.
1750	John Blachford	Goldsmith	
1750	Francis Cockayne	Farrier	
1751	Thomas Winterbottom	Clothworker	
1752	Robert Alsop	Brewer	
1752	Sir Crisp Gascoyne	Ironmonger	
1753	Edward Ironside	Goldsmith	
1753	Sir Thomas Rawlinson	Grocer	
1754	Stephen Theodore Janssen, MP	Stationer	
1755	Slingsby Bethell, MP	Fishmonger	
1756	Marshe Dickinson, MP	Grocer	
1757	Sir Charles Asgill, 1st Baronet	Skinner	
1758	Sir Richard Glyn, 1st Baronet	Salter	
1759	Sir Thomas Chitty	Salter	
1760	Sir Matthew Blakiston, 1st Baronet	Grocer	
1761	Sir Samuel Fludyer, 1st Baronet	Clothworker	
1762	Sir William Beckford, MP	Goldsmith	First of two terms.
1763	William Bridgen	Cutler	
1764	Sir William Stephenson	Grocer	
1765	George Nelson	Grocer	
1766	Sir Robert Kite	Skinner	
1767	Thomas Harley	Goldsmith	
1768	Samuel Turner	Clothworker	
1769	Sir William Beckford	Goldsmith	Second of two terms.
1770	Barlow Trecothick, MP	Clothworker	
1770	Brass Crosby, MP	Goldsmith	Previously Musician.
1771	William Nash	Salter	
1772	James Townsend, MP	Mercer	
1773	Frederick Bull	Salter	
1774	John Wilkes, MP	Joiner	
1775	John Sawbridge, MP	Framework Knitter	
1776	Sir Thomas Hallifax	Goldsmith	
1777	Sir James Esdaile	Cooper	
1778	Samuel Plumbe	Goldsmith	Previously Gold & Silver Wyre Drawer
1779	Brackley Kennett	Vintner	
1780	Sir Watkin Lewes	Joiner	
1781	Sir William Plomer	Tyler	
1782	Nathaniel Newnham, MP	Mercer	
1783	Robert Peckham	Wheelwright	
1784	Richard Clark	Joiner	
1785	Thomas Wright	Stationer	
1786	Thomas Sainsbury	Bowyer	
1787	John Burnell	Glover	
1788	William Gill	Stationer	
1789	William Pickett, MP	Goldsmith	
1790	John Boydell	Stationer	
1791	Sir John Hopkins	Grocer	
1792	Sir James Sanderson, 1st Baronet	Draper	
1793	Sir Paul Le Mesurier	Goldsmith	
1794	Thomas Skinner	Haberdasher	
1795	Sir William Curtis, 1st Baronet	Draper	
1796	Sir Brook Watson, 1st Baronet	Musician	
1797	Sir John Anderson, 1st Baronet	Glover	
1798	Sir Richard Glyn, 1st Baronet	Salter	
1799	Harvey Christian Combe, MP	Brewer	
1800	Sir William Staines	Carpenter	

=== 19th century ===
Elected	Name	Mother livery company	Notes
1801	Sir John Eamer	Salter	
1802	Sir Charles Price, 1st Baronet	Ironmonger	
1803	Sir John Perring, 1st Baronet	Clothworker	
1804	Peter Perchard	Goldsmith	
1805	Sir James Shaw, 1st Baronet	Scrivener	
1806	Sir William Leighton	Shipwright	Previously Wheelwright, Fishmonger
1807	John Ansley	Merchant Taylor	
1808	Sir Charles Flower, 1st Baronet	Framework Knitter	
1809	Thomas Smith	Leatherseller	
1810	Joshua Smith	Ironmonger	Previously Pattenmaker
1811	Sir Claudius Hunter, 1st Baronet	Merchant Taylor	
1812	George Scholey	Distiller	
1813	Sir William Domville, 1st Baronet	Stationer	
1814	Samuel Birch	Cook	
1815–1816	Sir Matthew Wood, 1st Baronet	Fishmonger	
1817	Christopher Smith, MP	Draper	
1818	John Atkins, MP	Merchant Taylor	
1819	George Bridges, MP	Wheelwright	
1820	John Thomas Thorp, MP	Draper	
1821	Christopher Magnay	Merchant Taylor	
1822	Sir William Heygate, 1st Baronet	Merchant Taylor	
1823	Robert Waithman, MP	Framework Knitter	
1824	John Garratt	Goldsmith	
1825	William Venables, MP	Stationer	
1826	Anthony Brown	Fishmonger	
1827	Matthias Prime Lucas	Vintner	
1828	William Thompson, MP	Ironmonger	
1829	John Crowder	Playing Card Maker	
1830–1831	Sir John Key, 1st Baronet	Stationer	
1832	Sir Peter Laurie	Saddler	
1833	Charles Farebrother	Vintner	
1834	Henry Winchester, MP	Cutler	
1835	William Taylor Copeland, MP	Goldsmith	
1836	Thomas Kelly	Plaisterer	
1837	Sir John Cowan, 1st Baronet	Wax Chandler	
1838	Samuel Wilson	Weaver	
1839	Sir Chapman Marshall	Innholder	
1840	Thomas Johnson	Cooper	
1841	Sir John Pirie, 1st Baronet	Plaisterer	
1842	John Humphery, MP	Tallow Chandler	
1843	Sir William Magnay, 1st Baronet	Stationer	
1844	Michael Gibbs	Fishmonger	
1845	John Johnson	Spectacle Maker	
1846	Sir George Carroll	Spectacle Maker	
1847	John Kinnersley Hooper	Vintner	
1848	Sir James Duke, 1st Baronet	Spectacle Maker	
1849	Thomas Farncombe	Tallow Chandler	
1850	Sir John Musgrove, 1st Baronet	Clothworker	
1851	William Hunter	Upholder	
1852	Thomas Challis, MP	Butcher	
1853	Thomas Sidney, MP	Girdler	
1854	Sir Francis Moon, 1st Baronet	Stationer	
1855	Sir David Salomons, 1st Baronet	Cooper	
1856	Thomas Quested Finnis, MP	Bowyer	
1857	Sir Robert Carden, 1st Baronet	Cutler	
1858	David Wire	Innholder	
1859	John Carter	Clockmaker	
1860–1861	William Cubitt, MP	Fishmonger	
1862	Sir William Rose	Clothworker	
1863	Sir William Lawrence	Carpenter	
1864	Warren Hale	Tallow Chandler	
1865	Sir Benjamin Phillips	Spectacle Maker	
1866	Sir Thomas Gabriel, 1st Baronet	Goldsmith	
1867	William Ferneley Allen	Stationer	In 1867, Michaelmas Day fell on the Sabbath. Alderman Allen elected on 28 September.
1868	Sir James Lawrence, 1st Baronet	Carpenter	
1869	Robert Besley	Loriner	
1870	Sir Thomas Dakin	Spectacle Maker	
1871	Sir John Sills Gibbons, 1st Baronet	Salter	
1872	Sir Sydney Waterlow, 1st Baronet	Stationer	
1873	Sir Andrew Lusk, 1st Baronet	Spectacle Maker	
1874	David Henry Stone	Spectacle Maker	
1875	Sir William Cotton	Haberdasher	
1876	Sir Thomas White	Vintner	Previously Feltmaker
1877	Sir Thomas Owden	Innholder	
1878	Sir Charles Whetham	Leatherseller	
1879	Sir Francis Wyatt Truscott	Stationer	
1880	Sir William McArthur	Spectacle Maker	
1881	Sir John Ellis, 1st Baronet	Merchant Taylor	
1882	Sir Henry Knight	Fishmonger	Previously Spectacle Maker
1883	Sir Robert Fowler, 1st Baronet	Spectacle Maker	First of two terms.
1884	George Nottage	Spectacle Maker	Died in office; the last Lord Mayor to have done so.
1885	Sir Robert Fowler	Spectacle Maker	Second of two terms; the last Lord Mayor to have served more than once.
1885	Sir John Staples	Leatherseller	
1886	Sir Reginald Hanson, 1st Baronet	Shipwright	Previously Merchant Taylor
1887	Sir Polydore de Keyser	Spectacle Maker	
1888	Sir James Whitehead, 1st Baronet	Fanmaker	
1889	Sir Henry Isaacs	Loriner	
1890	Sir Joseph Savory, 1st Baronet	Goldsmith	
1891	Sir David Evans	Haberdasher	
1892	Sir Stuart Knill, 1st Baronet	Goldsmith	
1893	Sir George Tyler, 1st Baronet	Stationer	
1894	Sir Joseph Renals, 1st Baronet	Spectacle Maker	
1895	Sir Walter Wilkin	Broderer	
1896	Sir George Faudel-Phillips, 1st Baronet	Spectacle Maker	
1897	Lt-Col. Sir Horatio Davies	Spectacle Maker	
1898	Sir John Voce Moore	Loriner	
1899	Sir Alfred Newton, 1st Baronet	Fanmaker	
1900	Sir Frank Green, 1st Baronet	Glazier	

=== 20th century ===
Elected	Name	Mother Livery Company	Notes
1901	Sir Joseph Dimsdale, 1st Baronet	Grocer	
1902	Sir Marcus Samuel, 1st Baronet	Spectacle Maker	Later Viscount Bearsted
1903	Sir James Ritchie, 1st Baronet	Shipwright	
1904	Sir John Pound, 1st Baronet	Leatherseller	
1905	Sir Walter Morgan, 1st Baronet	Cutler	
1906	Sir William Treloar, 1st Baronet	Loriner	
1907	Sir John Charles Bell, 1st Baronet	Haberdasher	Previously Fanmaker
1908	Sir George Wyatt Truscott, 1st Baronet	Stationer	
1909	Sir John Knill, 2nd Baronet	Goldsmith	
1910	Sir Thomas Vezey Strong	Stationer	
1911	Sir Thomas Crosby, MD	Turner	
1912	Col. Sir David Burnett, 1st Baronet	Loriner	
1913	Sir Vansittart Bowater, 1st Baronet	Girdler	
1914	Sir Charles Johnston, 1st Baronet	Innholder	
1915	Sir Charles Wakefield, 1st Baronet	Haberdasher	Later Viscount Wakefield
1916	Sir William Dunn, 1st Baronet	Wheelwright	
1917	Sir Charles Hanson, 1st Baronet	Pattenmaker	
1918	The Lord Marshall of Chipstead	Stationer	
1919	Sir Edward Cooper, 1st Baronet	Musician	
1920	Sir James Roll, 1st Baronet	Horner	
1921	Sir John Baddeley, 1st Baronet	Framework Knitter	
1922	Sir Edward Moore, 1st Baronet	Fruiterer	
1923	Col. Sir Louis Newton, 1st Baronet	Loriner	
1924	Sir Alfred Bower, 1st Baronet	Vintner	
1925	Sir William Pryke, 1st Baronet	Painter-Stainer	
1926	Sir Rowland Blades, 1st Baronet	Gardener	Later Baron Ebbisham
1927	Sir Charles Batho, 1st Baronet	Pavior	
1928	Sir Kynaston Studd, 1st Baronet	Fruiterer	
1929	Sir William Waterlow, 1st Baronet	Stationer	
1930	Sir William Neal, 1st Baronet	Horner	
1931	Sir Maurice Jenks, 1st Baronet	Haberdasher	
1932	Sir Percy Greenaway, 1st Baronet	Stationer	
1933	Sir Charles Collett, 1st Baronet	Glover	
1934	Sir Stephen Killik	Fanmaker	
1935	Sir Percy Vincent, 1st Baronet	Gold & Silver Wyre Drawer	
1936	Sir George Broadbridge	Loriner	Later Baron Broadbridge
1937	Sir Harry Twyford	Framework Knitter	
1938	Sir Frank Bowater, 1st Baronet	Girdler	Younger brother of Sir Vansittart Bowater (1913)
1939	Sir William Coxen, 1st Baronet	Cordwainer	
1940	Sir George Wilkinson, 1st Baronet	Stationer	
1941	Lt-Col. Sir John Laurie, 1st Baronet	Saddler	
1942	Sir Samuel Joseph, 1st Baronet	Cutler	
1943	Sir Frank Newson-Smith, 1st Baronet	Turner	
1944	Sir Frank Alexander, 1st Baronet	Shipwright	
1945	Sir Charles Davis, 1st Baronet	Fanmaker	
1946	Sir Bracewell Smith, 1st Baronet	Spectacle Maker	
1947	Sir Frederick Wells, 1st Baronet	Carman	
1948	Sir George Aylwen, 1st Baronet	Merchant Taylor	
1949	Sir Frederick Rowland, 1st Baronet	Horner	
1950	Denys Lowson	Grocer	Later Sir Denys Lowson, 1st Baronet
1951	Sir Leslie Boyce, 1st Baronet	Loriner	
1952	Sir Rupert de la Bère, 1st Baronet	Skinner	
1953	Sir Noël Bowater, 2nd Baronet	Vintner	Nephew of Sir Vansittart Bowater (1913), son of Sir Frank Bowater (1938)
1954	Sir Seymour Howard, 1st Baronet	Gardener	
1955	Sir Cuthbert Ackroyd, 1st Baronet	Carpenter	
1956	Sir Cullum Welch, 1st Baronet	Haberdasher	
1957	Sir Denis Truscott	Stationer	
1958	Sir Harold Gillett, 1st Baronet	Basketmaker	
1959	Sir Edmund Stockdale, 1st Baronet	Carpenter	
1960	Sir Bernard Waley-Cohen, 1st Baronet	Clothworker	
1961	Sir Frederick Hoare, 1st Baronet	Spectacle Maker	
1962	Sir Ralph Perring, 1st Baronet	Tin Plate Worker	
1963	Sir James Harman	Painter-Stainer	
1964	Sir James Miller	Coachmaker	Also served as Lord Provost of Edinburgh (1951–1954)
1965	Sir Lionel Denny	Vintner	
1966	Sir Robert Bellinger	Broderer	
1967	Sir Gilbert Inglefield	Haberdasher	
1968	Sir Charles Trinder	Fletcher	
1969	Sir Ian Frank Bowater	Haberdasher	Nephew of Sir Vansittart Bowater (1913), son of Sir Frank Bowater (1938), younger brother of Sir Noël Bowater (1953)
1970	Sir Peter Studd	Merchant Taylor	
1971	Sir Edward Howard, 2nd Baronet	Gardener	
1972	Alan Mais, Baron Mais	Pavior	
1973	Sir Hugh Wontner	Feltmaker	
1974	Sir Murray Fox	Wheelwright	
1975	Sir Lindsay Ring	Armourer & Brasier	
1976	Sir Robin Gillett, 2nd Baronet	Master Mariner	
1977	Sir Peter Vanneck	Gunmaker	
1978	Sir Kenneth Cork	Horners	
1979	Sir Peter Gadsden	Clothworker	
1980	Sir Ronald Gardner-Thorpe	Painter-Stainer	
1981	Sir Christopher Leaver	Carman	
1982	Sir Anthony Jolliffe	Painter-Stainer	
1983	Dame Mary Donaldson	Gardener	First female Lord Mayor. Later Baroness Donaldson of Lymington
1984	Sir Alan Traill	Cutler	
1985	Sir Allan Davis	Painter-Stainer	
1986	Sir David Rowe-Ham	Wheelwright	
1987	Sir Greville Spratt	Ironmonger	
1988	Sir Christopher Collett	Glover	
1989	Sir Hugh Bidwell	Grocer	
1990	Sir Alexander Graham	Mercer	
1991	Sir Brian Jenkins	Chartered Accountant	
1992	Sir Francis McWilliams	Loriner	
1993	Sir Paul Newall	Baker	
1994	Sir Christopher Walford	Playing Card Maker	
1995	Sir John Chalstrey	Apothecary	
1996	Sir Roger Cork	Bowyer	Son of Sir Kenneth Cork (1978)
1997	Sir Richard Nichols	Salter	
1998	The Lord Levene of Portsoken	Carman	
1999	Sir Clive Martin	Stationer	
2000	Sir David Howard, 3rd Baronet	Gardener	Grandson of Sir Seymour Howard (1954)

=== 21st century ===
City of London coat of arms

Elected	Name	Mother Livery Company	Notes
2001	Sir Michael Oliver	Ironmonger	
2002	Sir Gavyn Arthur	Gardener	
2003	Sir Robert Finch	Solicitor	
2004	Sir Michael Savory	Poulter	
2005	Sir David Brewer	Merchant Taylor	
2006	Sir John Stuttard	Glazier	
2007	Sir David Lewis	Solicitor	
2008	Ian Luder	Cooper	
2009	Nick Anstee	Butcher	
2010	Sir Michael Bear	Pavior	
2011	Sir David Wootton	Fletcher	
2012	Sir Roger Gifford	Musician	
2013	Dame Fiona Woolf	Solicitor	Second female Lord Mayor.
2014	Sir Alan Yarrow	Fishmonger	
2015	The Lord Mountevans	Shipwright	Also a Goldsmith and elected Hereditary Member of the House of Lords.
2016	Sir Andrew Parmley	Musician	also Glass Seller.
2017	Sir Charles Bowman	Grocer	
2018	Sir Peter Estlin	Banker	
2019–2020	Sir William Russell	Haberdasher	Served a two-year term due to the COVID-19 pandemic
2021	Vincent Keaveny	Woolman	
2022	Sir Nicholas Lyons	Merchant Taylor	
2023	Michael Mainelli	World Trader	First American-born Lord Mayor.
2024	Alastair King	Blacksmith	
2025	Dame Susan Langley	Insurers	
2026	Bronek Masojada	Insurers	

== See also ==
- Timeline of London
- List of sheriffs of London
