= Cutlers' Company =

Cutlers' Company may refer to the following organisations in England:

- Worshipful Company of Cutlers, in London, chartered 1416
- Company of Cutlers in Hallamshire, in Sheffield, founded 1624
