= Alice la Haubergere =

English mail maker (fl. 1271–1310)

Alice la Haubergere (Note: Rendered as Avice la Haubergere after 1307, and as Alice le Haubergere due to a probable scribal error.) (lit. 'Alice the Mailmaker'; fl. 1271–1310) was an English mail maker from London who is one of the earliest known female blacksmiths in England. Trained as an armourer by her father, she also owned a brewery and was a landlady for several prominent Londoners.

== Biography ==
Alice la Haubergere first appeared in records in 1271. She was the daughter of Reginald le Hauberger, a mail maker from Cheapside in London and was probably trained in the trade by her father. The patent rolls indicate she used the feminised occupational surname "la Haubergere" – meaning "the mailmaker" – throughout her life, even during her marriage; this was highly unusual, as married women of this period would be identified with the surname of their husbands.

Although an armourer by trade, Haubergere became involved in brewing during her marriage to Thomas le Marshal, a vintner and tavern owner. After she inherited a large brewery – Le Horshed – and seven shops from her father, the couple leased it to William le Paternoster in 1280, periodically collecting advances on the leases for ten years to avoid charges of usury. During this period, she also worked as a journeyman armourer: two of her shops were leased by the armourers Andrew le Armurer in 1284 and Druettus le Armurer in 1290.

Her husband Marshal died some time before 1305, as she had remarried to a man named Roger Cary who also died before this year. During this period, Haubergere rented out tenement housing; among her tenants were William de Leyre and Richer de Refham. In 1305, she became involved in a legal dispute with Roger de Broune, (Note: Alternatively spelled Brunne.) one of her tenants, who filed a charge of trespass against her in the Mayor's Court on 1 July 1305. Broune had leased a tenement from her near the Great Conduit for a period of her life plus two years. While he was serving in the king's army in Scotland and was therefore under the king's protection, Broune alleged that Haubergere barricaded the door of the property until his wife paid a tallage of 21 shillings. Broune also alleged that Haubergere had annulled (eloigned) his deed because her husband Cary – who died before the trial – wanted the property.

Leyre was the judge presiding over the trial. He was accused by Broune of maintenance as Leyre frequently interrupted Broune's arguments by "impleading him". Haubergere's trial was held on 5 July 1305. During the trial, Broune asserted that she had annulled her portion of the indenture and refused to restore his deed, while Haubergere argued that he never held seisin (legal ownership) of the property by virtue of the deed. Haubergere demanded a trial by jury, one of whom was William de Bristol. The jury found in favour of Broune, determining that Haubergere had in fact "tore the deed". She was ordered to pay Broune half a mark and was sentenced to prison "until &c".

By September 1305, Haubergere had been released from prison on mainprise due to illness. She appeared before the lord mayor of London (Note: Likely John le Blund.) on 3 September 1305 and acknowledged that she had in fact torn up the deed, for which she was re-sentenced to prison. After her release, she seems to have remained active as a blacksmith. The last record of Haubergere is in 1310.
