= William Leighton (Lord Mayor of London) =

British shipowner and merchant

Sir William Leighton (1752 – 23 April 1826) was a British shipowner and merchant who served as the Lord Mayor of London in 1806.

Leighton's family was from County Durham in the North East of England and he moved to London around 1779 following his father's death. Leighton worked as a coal merchant shipping coal from the port of Newcastle, and was based at Newcastle's Coal Exchange.

Leighton was a prominent shipowner who owned Borrowdale, Fishburn and Golden Grove, three of the ships of the First Fleet, which transported convicts to the British colony of New south Wales. Leighton also owned several ships that were sent as military transports to the British Province of Quebec with contracts from the British Navy.

Because of his maritime interests, Leighton served on various shipping committees.

== Civic career ==
Leighton was a member of the Livery company of the Worshipful Company of Wheelwrights. He was created an alderman in the City of London's Billingsgate ward in 1799, before his resignation as an alderman in 1821. He was subsequently elected one of the Sheriffs of the City of London in 1803.

In 1806, Leighton was proclaimed Lord Mayor of London, and knighted on 1 May that year. Leighton was listed as one of the governors of Christ's Hospital in 1825.

Leighton died at Kemnal House in Kent, in 1826. He had previously lived in Charlton.

Civic offices
Preceded by James Shaw	Lord Mayor of London; 1806–1807	Succeeded by John Ansley
