= Henry Aaron Isaacs =

Lord Mayor of London, Sheriff of the City of London, and Alderman

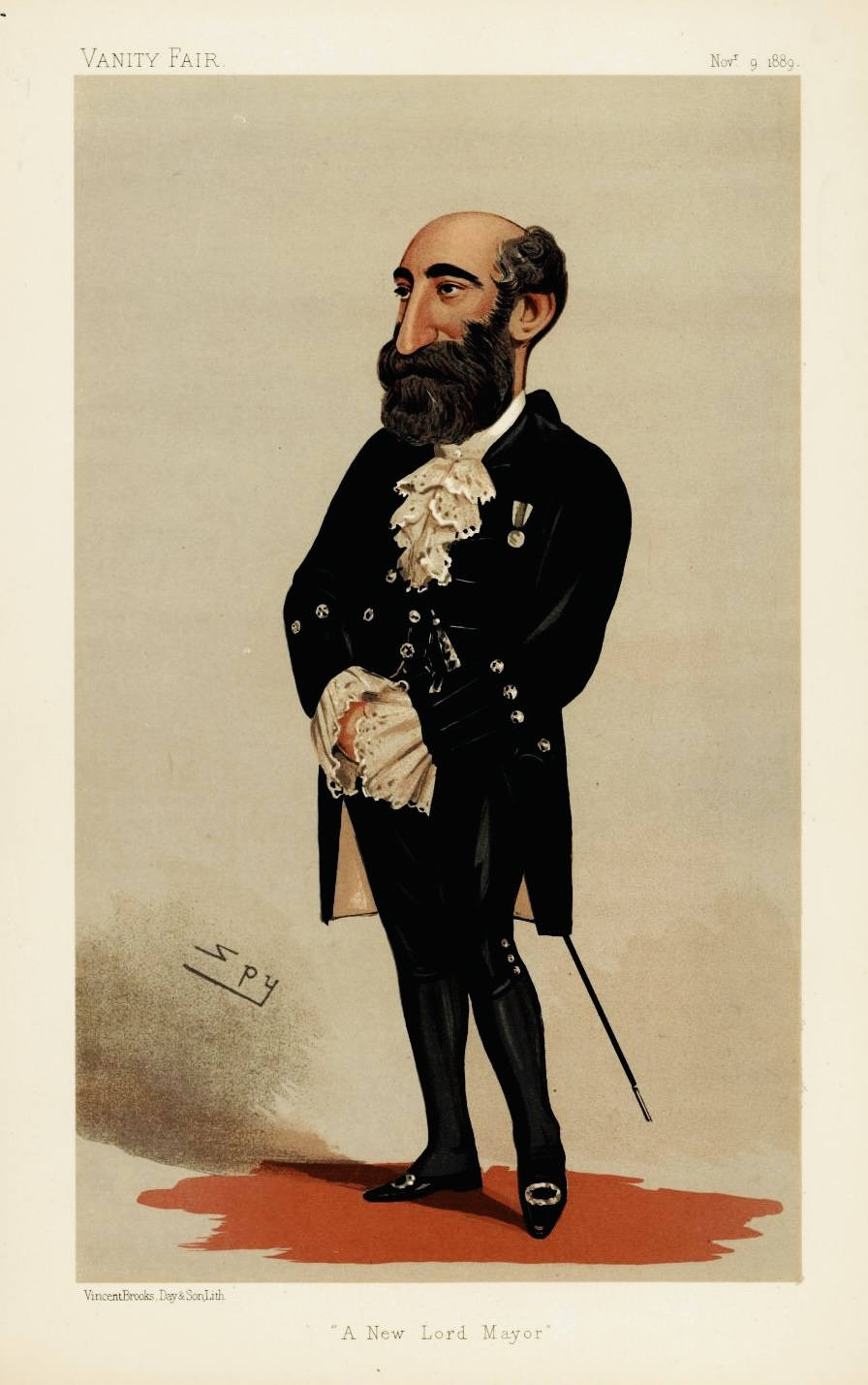
Sir Henry Aaron Isaacs by 'Spy' for Vanity Fair (1889)

Sir Henry Aaron Isaacs (15 August 1830–2 August 1909) was an Alderman, Sheriff of the City of London and Lord Mayor of London in 1889.

== Biography ==
Henry ‘Michael’ Isaacs was born in London in 1830, the eldest son of the fruit merchant Michael Isaacs (1802-1859) and Sara née de Mendoza (1793-1859), daughter of Aaron de Mendoza, a relative of Daniel Mendoza, the champion boxer. His nephew was Rufus Isaacs, the first Marquess of Reading. Henry Isaacs was a leading City trader, and, as a Liberal aged 32, he was elected as a Common Councillor in 1862 in the Aldgate ward. He was Alderman in Portsoken from 1883 to 1891 where he took an interest in the markets. He held the office of Sheriff of the City of London between 1886 and 1887 and during 1889-1890 he was Lord Mayor of London. A Freemason, he was Master of the Worshipful Company of Loriners, Warden of the Hambro Synagogue, a member of the Jewish Board of Guardians and a Justice of the Peace (J.P.) for London.

For a quarter of a century he laboured in the best interests of the City of London. He agitated for improving the dwellings of the poor, and was mainly instrumental in bringing about much-needed reforms in the finance committee of the corporation. In 1859, he was appointed to the chairmanship of the City Lands Committee. Some years later, as head of the Markets Committee, he gave valuable evidence before the House of Commons; and Tower Bridge owed its existence, in a great measure, to his persistence.

In September 1848 he married Eleanor Rowland (1830-1901), daughter of Alexander McDonald Rowland (1789-1855). With her, he had four children: Michael Henry Isaacs (1850-1897); Louisa Ellen Isaacs (1851-1925); Sarah Isaacs (1856-1949) and Joseph Alexander Isaacs (1868-1942). At least one of their children was born deaf and dumb, sparking Isaac's enthusiasm for the teaching of deaf-mutes. Favouring the oral system of teaching deaf-mutes, his brochure Sounds Versus Signs was a recognized authority.

His book Memoirs of My Mayoralty was privately published in 1890.

Sir Henry Aaron Isaacs died on 2 August 1909 at age 78.

Civic offices
Preceded by Sir James Whitehead	Lord Mayor of London; 1889 – 1890	Succeeded by Joseph Savory
