= William Nash (Lord Mayor of London) =

William Nash was a grocer and politician in 18th century London.

== Life ==
Originally from Worcester, he was the co-owner of a wholesale grocery business in Cannon Street in the City of London, and known as the "opulent grocer". He was elected an Alderman in 1766, served as Sheriff in 1768, and on 8 October 1771 succeeded Brass Crosby as Lord Mayor of London, being succeeded in turn on 24 October 1772 by James Townsend.
