= Worshipful Company of Carmen =

Livery company of the City of London

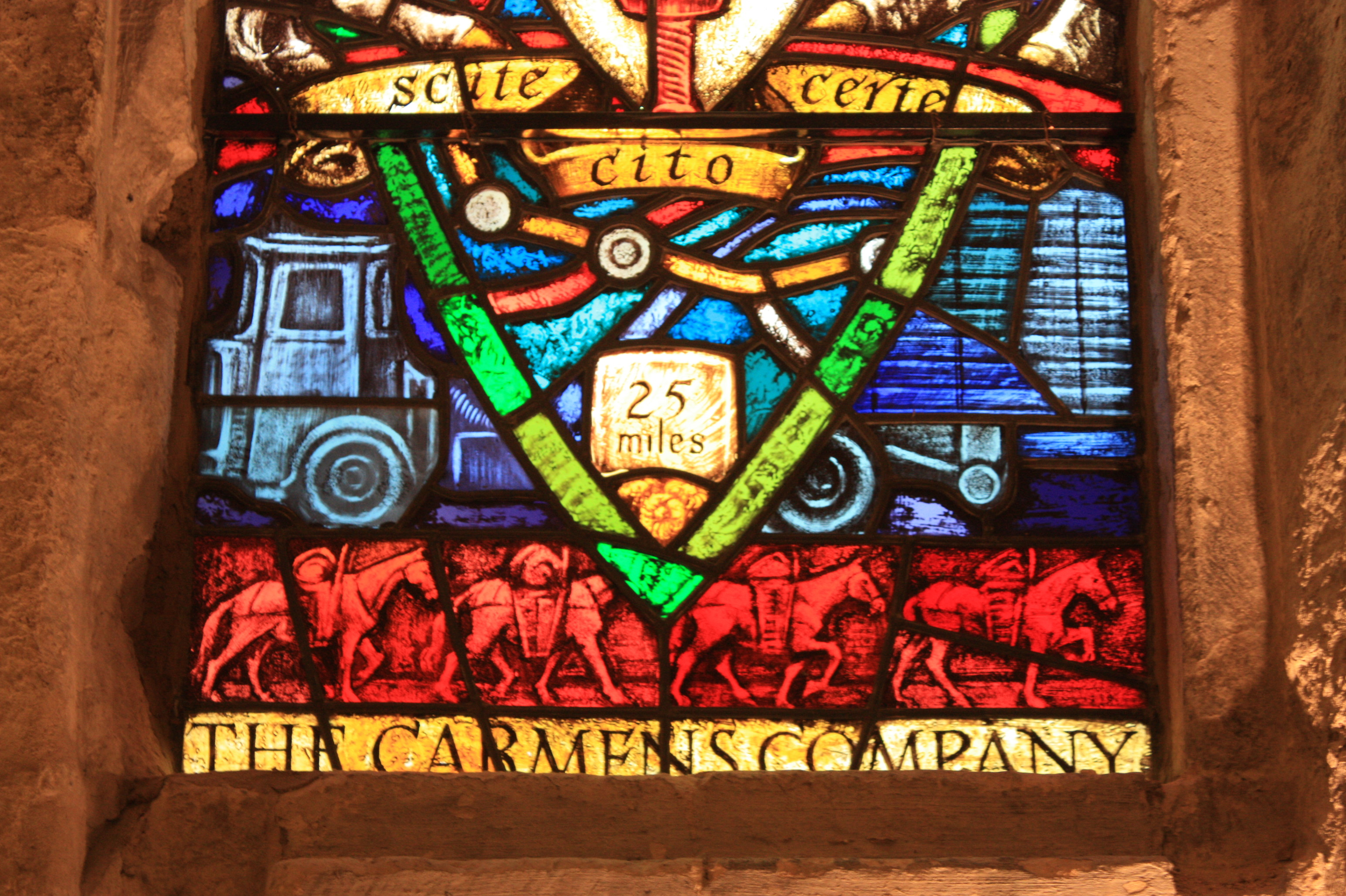
Stained glass to the Company of Carmen, Guildhall, London (detail)

The Worshipful Company of Carmen is one of the Livery Companies of the City of London, whose origins date back to 1517.

Carmen, or drivers of carts, caused upset in 1481. The King conscripted carts to carry his wine allowing rural carters to force food prices up. By offering to provide the King's carriage and clean the streets the Fellowship of Carmen was established in 1517 with authority to control the cartage trade. Carmen organised themselves into a fraternity and plied for hire. However, this was contested by the Woodmongers' Company, who owned more carts. The Carmen turned to Christ's Hospital, who were short of cash at the time. However, by 1597 the Carmen had fallen out with Christ's Hospital, the Woodmongers asserted their control again, and absorbed the Carmen in 1605. However alongside other rearrangements in the haulage trade, the Carmen separated and formed their own fellowship in 1668, but were unsuccessful in gaining the power to regulate carmen, until the Woodmongers became defunct in 1746. The Carmen did not acquire a royal charter until 1946.

Now that carts have been rendered obsolete by trucks and vans, the Carmen remain as a charitable and ceremonial institution with over 500 Liverymen, 180 Freemen plus an additional 23 apprentices. The Carmen organise the ceremony of Cart Marking, which originated in the rule that no cart could ply for hire within the City of London unless licensed by the corporation. Presently, the ceremony involves human powered, horsed, steam, fossil fuelled or electric, old and new vehicles rather than carts.

The Carmen's Company ranks seventy-seventh in the order of precedence for Livery Companies. Its motto is Scite, Cite, Certo, Latin for Skilfully, Swiftly, Surely. It was granted a livery in 1848; there would not be another new livery company until the Honourable Company of Master Mariners, formed in 1932.

== Coat of arms ==
Coat of arms of Worshipful Company of Carmen
Crest On a wreath of the colours, A demi cart horse argent, collared sable, resting the sinister hoof on a wheel as in the Arms. Escutcheon Or, a sword erect, point upwards, in pale proper, pommel and hilt gules, between two cart wheels in fesse of the last. Supporters On either side a dray horse argent, harnessed and bridled proper, gorged with a wreath of roses gules, barbed, seeded and leaved also proper. Motto 'Scite, cito, certe'

== Sources ==
- Bennett E. (1952) The Worshipful Company of Carmen of London. A short history, London: Simpkin Marshall
- Birch, Clive (1999) Carr and Carmen, an illustrated record, London: Baron Books (2nd edition due 2018)
