= Worshipful Company of Gardeners =

Livery company of the City of London

The Worshipful Company of Gardeners
- Motto: In The Sweat Of Thy Brows Shalt Thow Eate Thy Bread
- Location: City of London
- Date of formation: 1345
- Charter granted: 1605
- Company association: Horticulture, Gardening, and Education

The Worshipful Company of Gardeners is one of the livery companies of the City of London. A fraternity of Gardeners existed in the middle of the fourteenth century; it received a royal charter in 1605. The company no longer exists as a regulatory authority for the sale of produce in London; instead serving as a charitable institution. The company also performs a ceremonial role; it formally presents bouquets to the Queen and to princesses upon their wedding, anniversary, or other similar occasion.

The Gardeners' Company ranks sixty-sixth in the order of precedence of City livery companies. Its motto is In The Sweat Of Thy Brows Shalt Thow Eate Thy Bread.

The Master Gardener (Nicholas Woolf for 2023/24) is assisted by the Upper Warden and Renter Warden. Other Gardeners' Company officers include the Clerk and Spadebearer.

== Origins ==
First mentioned in Corporation of London records in 1345, the Gardeners' Company hails from its predecessor medieval guild.

In 1605, after existing for centuries as a "mystery" or "fellowship", the Gardeners of London were incorporated by royal charter. This charter sets out the operations controlled by the Company: "The trade, crafte or misterie of gardening, planting, grafting, setting, sowing, cutting, arboring, rocking, mounting, covering, fencing and removing of plants, herbes, seedes, fruites, trees, stocks, setts, and of contryving the conveyances to the same belonging ... ".

=== Objectives ===
In the 21st century statutory control over the craft of gardening is neither feasible nor desirable. Instead, the Company pursues three main objectives, to:

1. promote the art and practice of good gardening throughout the country and especially in the London area. Further, to encourage and support educational establishments which are centres of horticultural excellence;
2. support charitable activities connected with horticulture or with the City of London. The Company does not benefit from large endowments and has never owned property. The Charitable Fund is therefore limited and largely dependent upon the generosity of its Liverymen and Freemen (i.e. members of the Company) who are expected to contribute to the Fund as a condition of membership;
3. promote the fellowship of gardening by introducing new members to the Company and to beautify the City of London and elsewhere by encouraging the display of flowers and foliage wherever and whenever possible. There is a wide knowledge of gardening and horticulture within the Company which can be drawn upon as practical support for new projects.

== Organisation and structure ==
Membership of the Company, as prescribed by the Court of Aldermen of the City of London, shall not exceed 330 Liverymen. The number of Freemen is unlimited.

The Company is administered by the Court of Assistants, comprising the Master, who acts as Chairman supported by the Upper Warden and Renter Warden, and 24 Assistants. Of these, not more than 6 are Past Masters and 18 are "below the Chair". The Master holds office for one year and is normally succeeded by the Upper Warden. The Clerk to the Company is the Chief Executive and has responsibility for day-to-day administration of the Company and acts as secretary to the Court.

Six committees, comprising Assistants and Liverymen, address specific matters relating to the Company's activities and make recommendations to the Court. The opportunity of participating in the running of the Company is thereby provided to Liverymen.

== The livery and freedom ==
The Company numbers among its members both professionals and amateurs who are actively involved in the craft. All are united by the common bond of gardens and gardening.

King Charles III is a Royal Liveryman as is the Duke of Edinburgh, who served as Master for 2013/14 when Earl of Wessex. The King and Queen of the Belgians are Royal Freemen of the Company, reflecting the British gardening's strong links with Belgium.

As a City Livery Company, there are close links with the Corporation of London and members of the Company are strongly represented on the Court of Common Council. Since 1891, the year in which the Company was granted livery status, 11 Lord Mayors of London have been Gardeners, of which, eight have served as Master.

Admission to the Company is usually by one of four routes: Patrimony, Servitude, Redemption or Presentation. Candidates for admission to the Freedom and advancement to the Livery are subject to interview and recommendation by a committee appointed by the Court. A fifth category of membership is that of Honorary Freedom (Freedom Honoris Causa) which the Court has the power to award to persons who have distinguished themselves by public service or individual merit.

== The Company's year ==
Installation Court, at which the Master and Wardens are installed, takes place on the first Thursday in July. It marks the beginning of the Company's year and is followed by a livery dinner. Court meetings followed by dinner take place in November (Autumn Court) and April (Spring Court), with a Harvest Court preceding the Harvest Thanksgiving service in October. Guests are invited to all livery dinners and guild services.

The Fairchild Lecture, delivered in accordance with the will of Thomas Fairchild, Citizen and Gardener, takes place on the first Tuesday in Pentecost at St. Giles, Cripplegate. Churches for the Guild services are decorated by the Flower Arrangers group within the Company, who also arrange flowers in St. Paul's Cathedral and on other Company occasions.

Its annual Livery and Ladies' Banquet is held at the Mansion House, in the presence of the Lord Mayor, at which the Master presents a donation for the Lord Mayor's Charity.

Visits, led by the Master, take place throughout the year to gardens and horticultural establishments at home and abroad and the Company pursues a busy programme of events.

The Gardeners' Company produces a magazine called The Spade, giving details of recent events and visits.

== Charitable activities ==
The Company makes donations through its independent Charity Board to registered charities only. The charities must be linked to horticulture and gardening. Individuals and groups in the horticultural industry who have fallen on hard times should consider applying to Perennial. The Company provides funds and advice for charitable garden projects and awards prizes to students of horticulture at Capel Manor College, Royal Botanic Gardens Kew, RHS Wisley, Writtle College and the City and Guilds of London Institute. The Prince of Wales's Trophy is presented annually to the student adjudged to have contributed most to the field of organic gardening. Trophies are also awarded to other deserving organisations and causes.

The Company organises the "Flowers in The City" Campaign in close co-operation with the Corporation of London. The aim is to encourage the planting of gardens, courtyards, atria, window boxes, troughs, tubs and hanging baskets to beautify the City. The award, by the Lord Mayor, of trophies and plaques for meritorious displays (Summer) takes place annually at Mansion House. The award for winter displays takes place annually at Cutlers' Hall.

The Master, whilst in office, represents the Company on a variety of charitable committees. Other members of the Company sit on those committees in their own right and also contribute their time and expertise to numerous other organisations for the furtherance of the craft and in pursuit of the Company's objectives. The Company is privileged to present a gift of produce each year to the Lord Mayor.
