= Worshipful Company of Framework Knitters =

Livery company of the City of London

The Worshipful Company of Framework Knitters is one of the livery companies of the City of London. It was incorporated by letters patent issued by Oliver Cromwell in 1657, with a royal charter from Charles II in 1663. It was granted livery status in 1713. For a period it had its own hall in Red Cross Street, however for various reasons it was sold.

The Framework Knitters' Company ranks sixty-fourth in the order of precedence for livery companies. Its motto is Speed, Strength and Truth United.

It maintains almshouses known as the Cottage Homes in Oadby, Leicestershire – and has an active bursary awards scheme for up-and-coming students in fashion and textiles.

Quarterly dinners are held, normally at Mansion House or livery halls within the square mile of the City of London. These are well attended with guests including the Lord Mayor of London and the sheriffs.
