= Worshipful Company of Tallow Chandlers =

Livery company of the City of London

Coordinates: 51.51136°N 0.09108°W

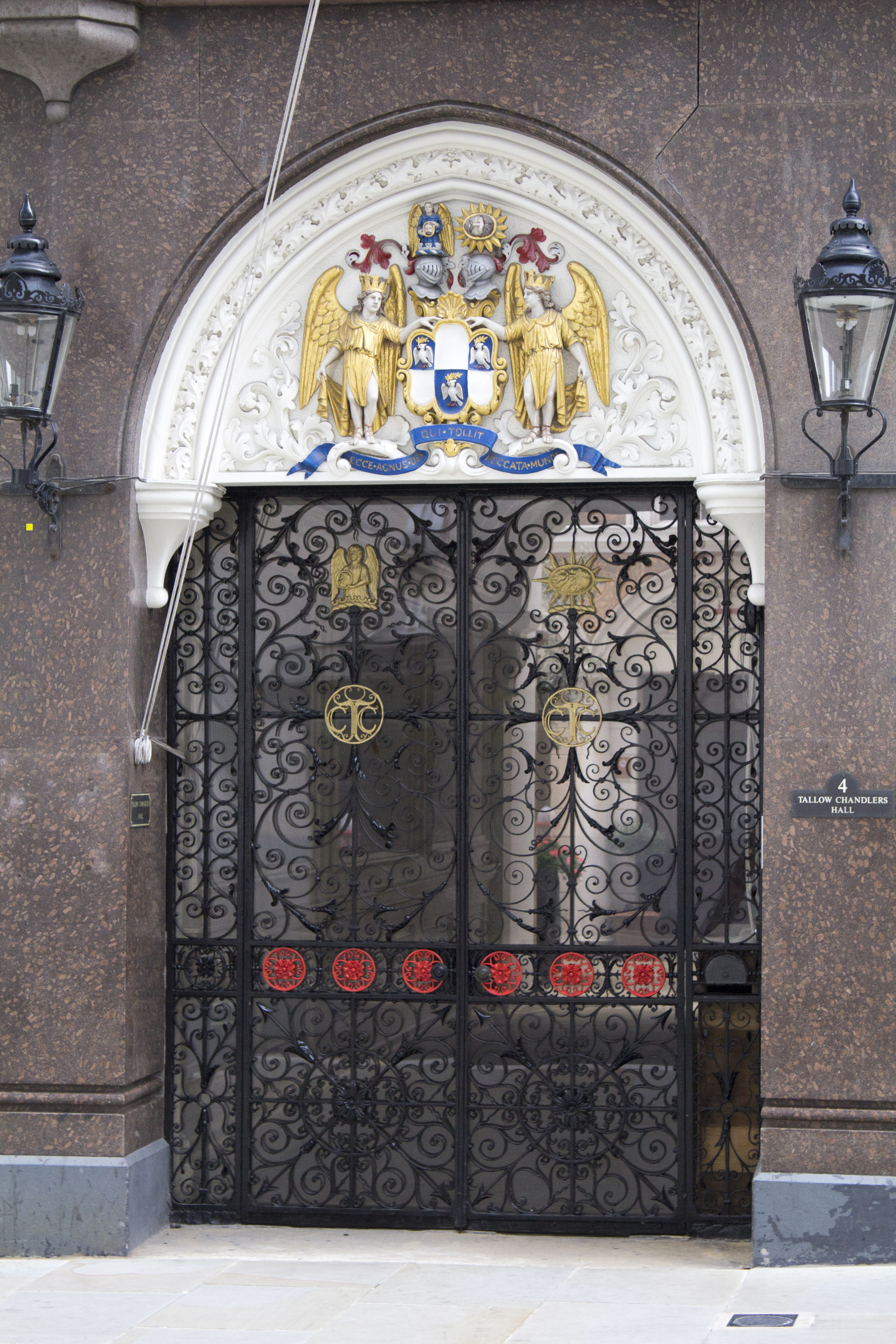
- Location: Tallow Chandlers' Hall; Dowgate Hill, London
- Date of formation: 1462
- Company association: Oil-related industries
- Order of precedence: 21st
- Master of company: (2023–2024) Julian Hill
- Website: www.tallowchandlers.org

The Worshipful Company of Tallow Chandlers is one of the ancient livery companies of the City of London. The organisation, which engaged not only in tallow candle making but also in the trade of oils, first received a royal charter in 1462.

Traditionally tallow chandlers operated separately from wax chandlers: beeswax candles customarily being used in churches and noble houses, while tallow (animal fat) candles were generally used in other homes. As is the case with most other livery companies, the Tallow Chandlers' Company is no longer a trade association of candlemakers, its decline precipitated by the advent of electric lighting. The company now exists as a charitable institution and supports education in oil-related fields.

The company ranks 21st in the Precedence of Livery Companies in the City of London. Its motto is Ecce Agnus Dei, Ecce Qui Tollit Peccata Mundi: Latin for "Behold the Lamb of God, Who Takes Away the Sins of the World", words of St John the Baptist (Patron Saint of the Company) in reference to Jesus.

Coat of arms of Worshipful Company of Tallow Chandlers
Crest "(On the dexter, the helmet contournee) On a wreath of the colours, an angel issuant from clouds proper, holding a platter Or, thereon the head of St. John the Baptist also proper. (On the sinister) On a wreath of the colours, On a charger proper rayonee Or the head of St. John the Baptist also proper." Escutcheon "Per fesse azure and argent, a fesse counterchanged and three doves of the second, membered gules, each holding in its beak an olive branch Or." Supporters "On either side on a mount vert an angel vested winged and crowned with stars Or." Motto "Ecce Agnus Dei qui tollit peccata mundi."
