= Worshipful Company of Fan Makers =

Livery company of the City of London

The Worshipful Company of Fan Makers is one of the Livery Companies of the City of London. The company was incorporated by a Royal Charter in 1709, and it was granted livery by the Court of Aldermen in 1809. As fan making is now done by machines rather than by craftsmen, the company is no longer a trade association for fan makers. Instead, the Company functions as a charitable establishment.

The Fan Makers' Company ranks seventy-sixth in the order of precedence for Livery Companies. Its motto is Arts and Trade United.

Coat of arms of Worshipful Company of Fan Makers

Crest
(Upon a helm with a wreath Or and Gules) a dexter hand couped below the wrist Proper holding a fan displayed Gold.
Escutcheon
Or a fan displayed with a mount of various devices and colours the sticks Gules on a chief per pale Gules and Azure dexter a shaving iron over a bundle of fan sticks tied together Or and sinister a framed saw in pale Gold.
