= John Ansley =

John Ansley (1774 – 23 September 1845) served as Lord Mayor of London from 1807 to 1808.

Ansley was a Merchant Taylor. He was appointed an alderman in the City of London's Bread Street ward in 1800 at the age of 26, and subsequently elected one of the Sheriffs of the City of London in 1805, before being elected Lord Mayor in 1807.

Ansley served as vice-president of the Royal Literary Fund for many years, and was a patron of the Merchant Taylors' School.

Civic offices
Preceded by William Leighton	Lord Mayor of London; 1807–1808	Succeeded by Charles Flower
