= Worshipful Company of Wax Chandlers =

Livery company of the City of London

Coordinates: 51.515678°N 0.095353°W

The Worshipful Company of Wax Chandlers
- Motto: Truth is the Light
- Location: Wax Chandlers' Hall, Gresham Street, London (since 1501)
- Date of formation: before 1330; Royal Charter 1484 (Richard III)
- Company association: Beeswax products
- Order of precedence: 20th
- Master of company: Ian Appleton
- Website: Wax Chandlers' Company

The Worshipful Company of Wax Chandlers is one of the oldest livery companies of the City of London, with one of the smallest memberships (about 120).

The Wax Chandlers' Company, ranked 20th in the City Livery Company order of precedence, has an association with the Church of St Vedast alias Foster in nearby Foster Lane.

== History ==
Established before 1330 (when it was recorded as being invited to contribute funds to King Edward III) and possibly before 1199 (from when there is some documentary evidence, relating to a property in Aldersgate Street, of its existence as a body), the company received further Byelaws and Ordinances from Lord Mayor John Stodeye in 1358. New Ordinances were issued in 1371 and the company was granted a Royal Charter in 1484 – one of only three known Royal Charters of King Richard III, the others being for the College of Arms and for the incorporation as a county borough of the city of Gloucester. The Company remains governed under its 1663 Royal Charter of King Charles II and corresponding Ordinances of 1664.

Wax chandlers (or merchants in beeswax products) traded separately from Tallow Chandlers; beeswax candles, being expensive, were usually reserved for churches and the households of royalty and nobility, while tallow candles were generally used in ordinary homes. In recent years, in February, the two companies have celebrated the Feast of Candlemas together.

== Company today ==
As with many City Livery Companies today, the Wax Chandlers' Company no longer operates primarily as a trade association. Its role has evolved into being a civic, ceremonial, educational and charitable institution. Like other livery companies, it takes an active role in supporting the corporate governance of the City of London and the Lord Mayor.

Examples of its charitable giving are its affiliation with Armed Forces units (HMS Protector, 5 Rifles and RAF Coningsby), the donation of candles to St Paul's Cathedral (every Holy Cross Day in September), support to those in need throughout the City and Greater London (particularly in the London Borough of Bexley), patronage of the National Honey Show and the British Beekeepers Association.

== Wax Chandlers' Hall ==
The Company has maintained a Hall on the same site (6 Gresham Street, London) since 1501. The Wax Chandlers' current premises, their sixth, were substantially rebuilt in 1954 after damage during World War II. Recently refurbished, the Hall is popular for hire on corporate or social occasions. Wax Chandlers' Hall can sometimes be viewed by the general public during the annual London Open House Weekend or by prior arrangement. The Company owns other property on Fleet Street in London.

== Membership ==
The Wax Chandlers' membership comprises Liverymen and Freemen (who initially join the Company by servitude (as Apprentices), by patrimony, or by redemption).
The Company is governed by the Master Wax Chandler, Wardens (Upper Warden and Renter Warden) and a Court of Assistants. Election Court each June determines appointments to senior office, with ceremonial installation on or around the Feast of the Transfiguration, in the first week of August.
The Company has supplied five Lord Mayors of London since the 18th century, including two in the 21st: Sir Gavyn Arthur and Dame Fiona Woolf DBE.
The Company is administered by the Clerk and day-to-day management of the Hall is overseen by the Beadle.

The Company's current membership includes:

- The Rt Rev & Rt Hon The Lord Williams of Oystermouth (former Archbishop of Canterbury)
- Dame Fiona Woolf DBE (686th Lord Mayor of London, former President of the Law Society of England and Wales)

== Arms ==
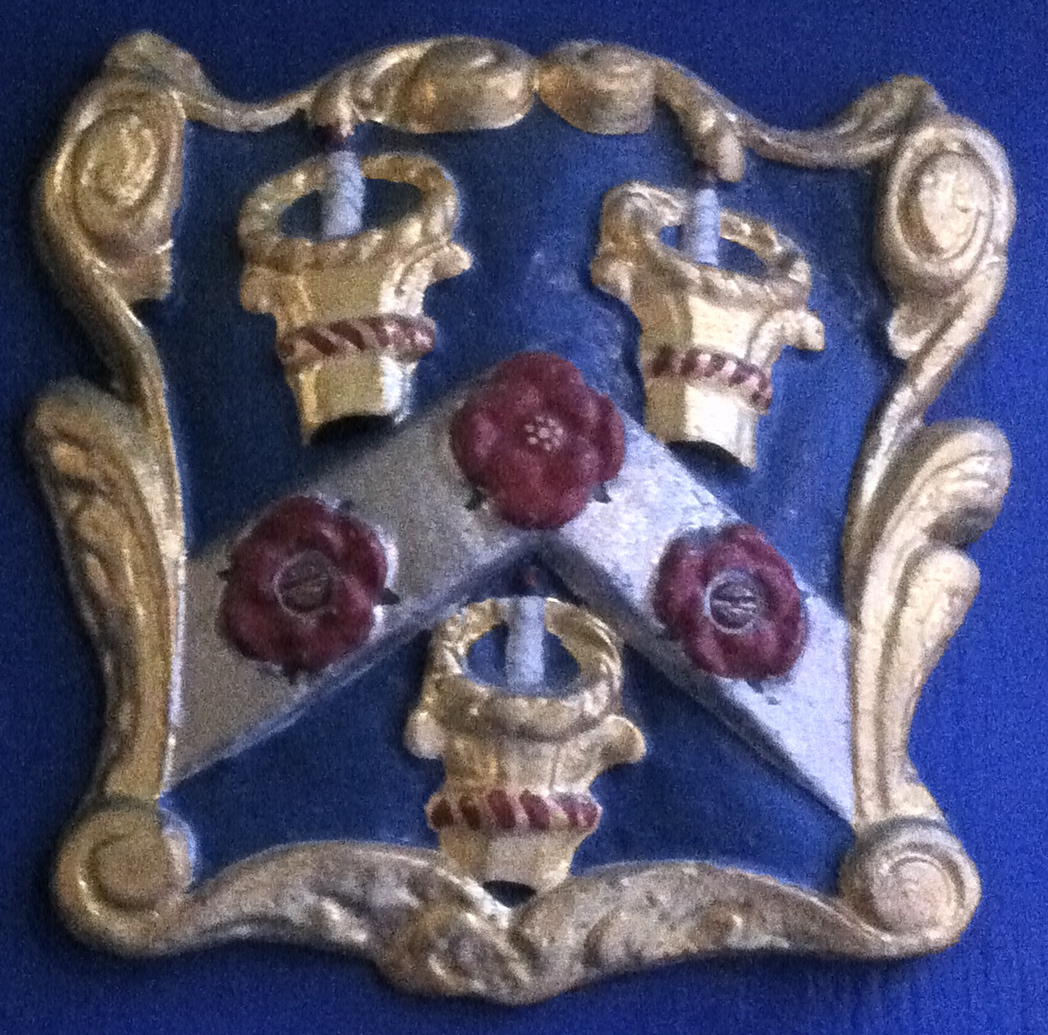
Wax Chandlers' Arms

The Company received a Grant of Arms from Sir Thomas Holme, Clarenceux King of Arms, on 3 February 1485, the year following the College of Arms' foundation; the Charter of foundation of the College of Arms and that incorporating the city of Gloucester are the only known Charters of Richard III other than that which established the Wax Chandlers' Company. There were minor changes (grant of supporters and their modification), but not to the escutcheon or crest, in 1530 and 1536.
The Company’s extant armorial bearings, as confirmed in the Visitation of London in 1630, are blazoned:

- Shield: Azure on a Chevron Argent three Roses Gules seeded Or between three Mortars royal Or. (A mortar is a type of candle-holder, similar to the mortar of a pestle-and-mortar; a mortar royal is particularly splendid.)
- Crest: On a wreath Or and Gules a Maiden vested in a Surcoat of Cloth of Or furred with Ermine, kneeling among divers Flowers Proper and making thereof a Garland.
- Mantling: Azure doubled Ermine.
- Supporters (granted in 1530, modified in 1536, but reverting to the 1530 version in 1630): On either side a Unicorn Argent gorged with a Garland of various Flowers Proper, the Horn wreathed Or and Gules.

== See also ==
- Corporation
- Guild
