= John le Blund =

Sir John le Blund was Mayor of London, England for eight consecutive years.

He was a member of the London Company of Drapers and became an alderman of the city in 1291. He was elected Mayor from 1301 to 1307.

He was involved in investigation of the crown jewels robbery of 1303 from Westminster. Edward I, King of England, was involved with warfare with Scotland in Linlithgow, Scotland in May 1303 at the time of the robbery. Upon hearing of the robbery in early June, Edward sent his Keeper of the King's Wardrobe, John de Drokensford, to investigate, while his justices would hold court in the city. On 17 June 1303 Mayor John Le Blund, Justice Ralph de Sandwich, Coroner John Circot, and Sheriff Simon de Paris heard the confession of William Palmer, valet of John Shenche, Keeper of the Palace. It was this confession that broke open the investigation and led to the conviction of so many.

John le Blund was knighted on 22 May 1306 by Edward I prior to an invasion of Scotland, making him the first Mayor of London to receive a knighthood. He died in 1312/1313.

== See also ==
- List of Lord Mayors of London
