= Worshipful Company of Horners =

Livery company of the City of London

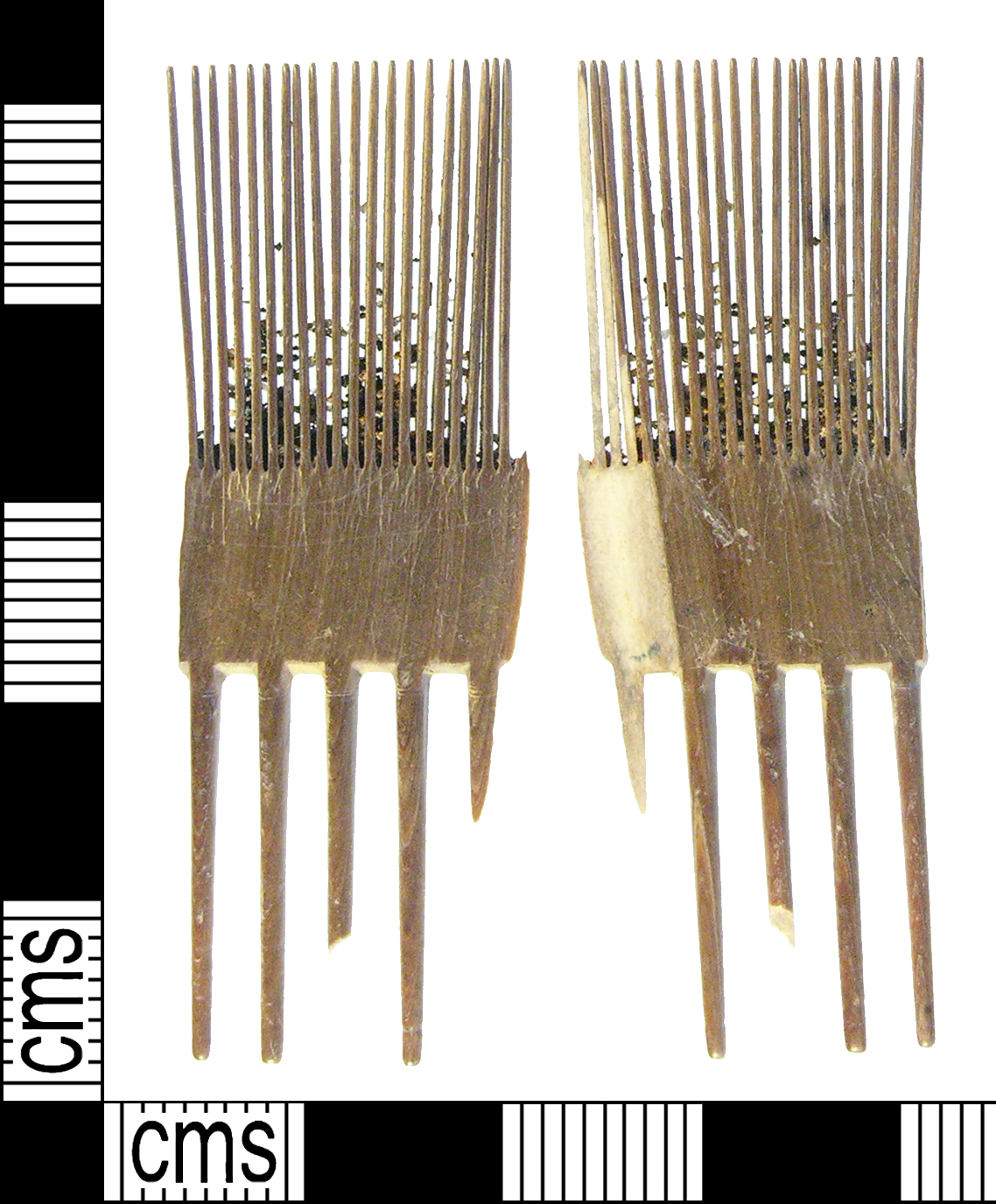
Horn or ivory comb, made between 1350 and 1600 and found in London

The Worshipful Company of Horners is one of the livery companies of the City of London. It existed in at least 1284. In 1476, the Leather Bottlemakers merged with the Horners. The company received its royal charter of incorporation in 1638.

Due to the decline of the trade of horn working, the company augmented its ongoing association with the ancient trade by encompassing new trades. In 1943, the company decided to support the plastics industry, as it continues to do. The company also acts as a charitable body.

The Horners' Company ranks fifty-fourth in the order of precedence for livery companies.
