= Worshipful Company of Spectacle Makers =

Livery company of the City of London

The Worshipful Company of Spectacle Makers
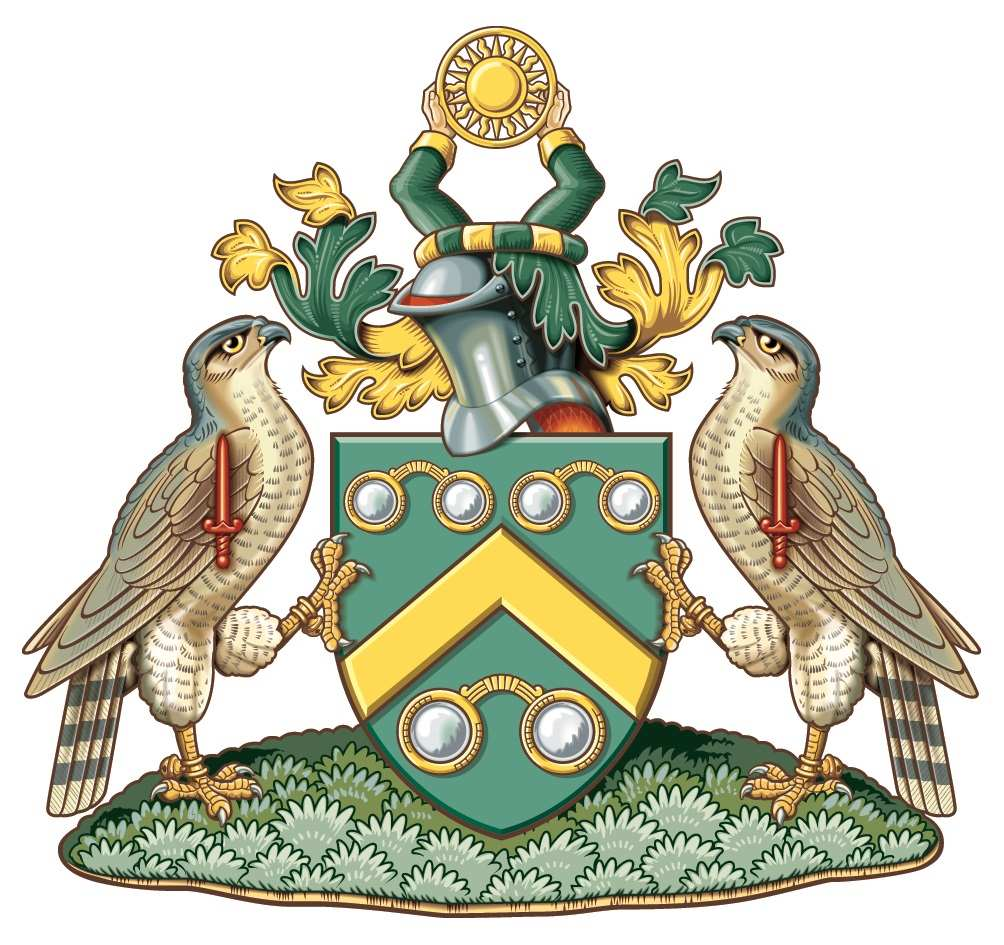
- Achievement of Arms for the Worshipful Company of Spectacle Makers
- Motto: A Blessing To The Aged (no longer used)
- Location: Apothecaries' Hall; Black Friars Lane, London
- Date of formation: 1629; 397 years ago Royal Charter (Charles I)
- Company association: Optical health and eye care
- Order of precedence: 60th
- Master of company: Mr David Baker (2026-27)
- Website: Spectacle Makers' Company

The Worshipful Company of Spectacle Makers is one of the Livery Companies of the City of London, UK. It ranks 60th in order of precedence of the Livery Companies.

The company was founded by a royal charter of Charles I in 1629 AD; it was granted the status of a Livery Company in 1809. The company was empowered to set regulations and standards for optical devices; this was eroded by the Industrial Revolution, after which mechanical advancements made trade restrictions difficult to enforce. It is the oldest existing optical body in the world.

== History ==
The Worshipful Company of Spectacle Makers was founded in 1629 when a group of skilled craftsmen, including spectacle makers and optical instrument workers, petitioned for official recognition of their trade. A Royal Charter was granted by King Charles I on 16 May 1629, formally establishing the Company. Edward Gregorie, a Master Goldsmith, was named the first Master, and Robert Alt is believed to have served as Upper Warden. Following Gregorie's death, his widow Martha married Alt and continued to train apprentices, demonstrating the early involvement of women in the craft. Both were later buried at St Ann, Blackfriars, close to the Company's present home at Apothecaries’ Hall.

The Company's early archives were largely destroyed in the Great Fire of London in 1666, though its original Charter and the Book of Ordinances from 1630 survived—likely rescued by a quick-thinking Clerk. These historic documents are now preserved in the London Metropolitan Archives.

In 1671 the Worshipful Company of Spectacle Makers broke up a batch of substandard spectacles on the London Stone:

Two and twenty dozen [= 264] of English spectacles, all very badd both in the glasse and frames not fitt to be put on sale ... were found badd and deceitful and by judgement of the Court condemned to be broken, defaced and spoyled both glasse and frame the which judgement was executed accordingly in Canning [Cannon] Street on the remayning parte of London Stone where the same were with a hammer broken in all pieces.

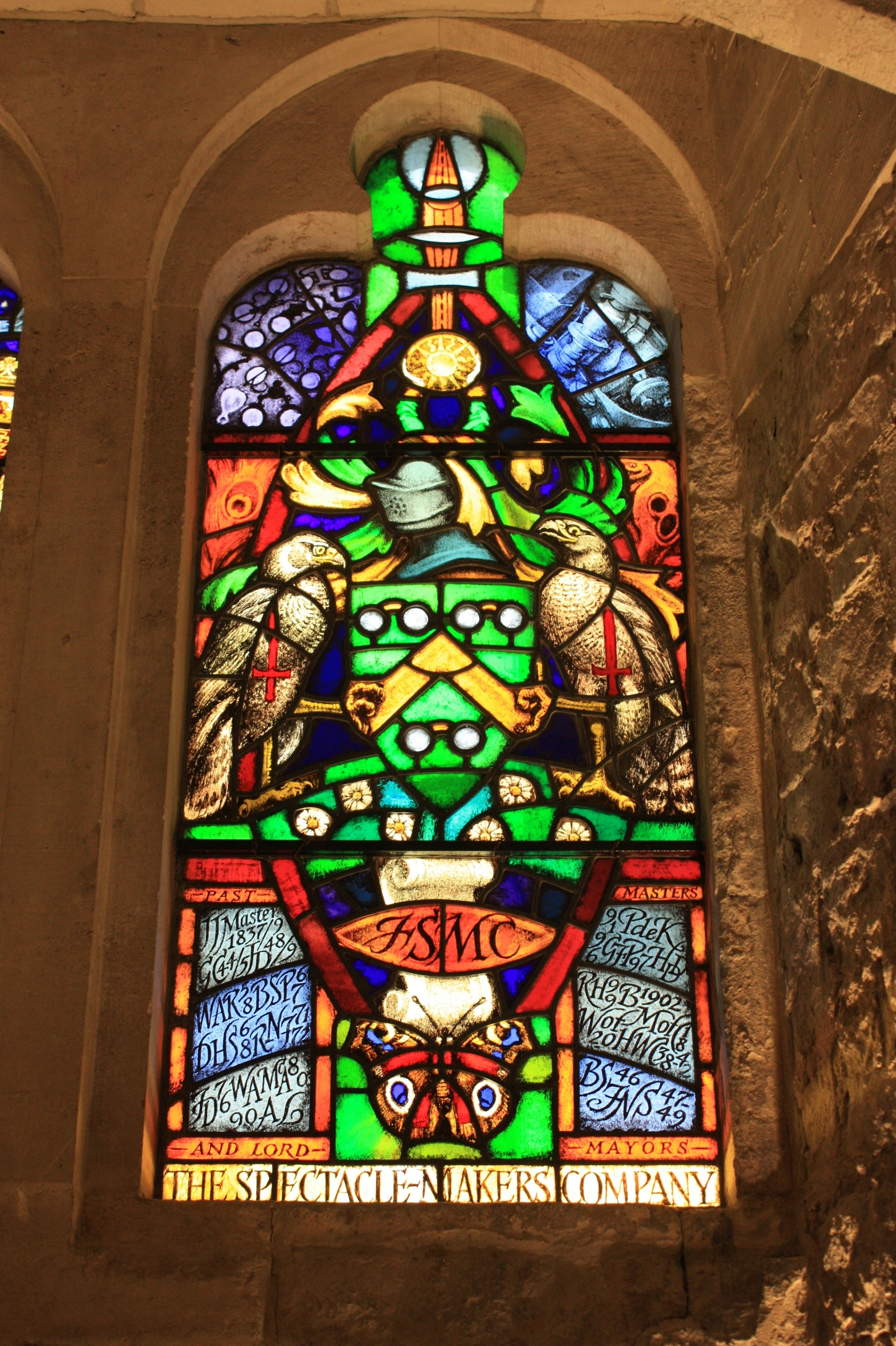
Stained glass to the Company of Spectacle Makers, Guildhall, London

Throughout the 20th century, the Company continued to evolve. In 1946, it established a permanent base at Apothecaries' Hall. A Supplemental Charter was issued in 1956 by Queen Elizabeth II, modernising its governance and expanding the Court of Assistants. In more recent years, the Company has focused on promoting eye health and supporting vision research and education. In 2020, it founded The Spectacle Makers' Charity to further these goals.

Today, the Worshipful Company of Spectacle Makers maintains its livery traditions while actively contributing to contemporary issues in vision care and education, upholding its founding motto: “A blessing to the aged and to the poor”.

The Company is governed by the Master, Deputy Master, Upper Warden and Renter Warden, assisted by a Court of Assistants. The Company is administered by a Clerk and Assistant Clerk.

== Examining powers ==
Following the loss of its monopoly on the production and evaluation of eyewear during the 19th Century, the Company acquired the right to set examinations that opticians had to pass before practicing. The opticians that passed the examinations were designated F.S.M.C. and this credential stood for Fellowship in Optometry of the Worshipful Company of Spectacle Makers.

This power was surrendered to the British College of Ophthalmic Opticians (now titled the College of Optometrists) in 1979, who took over the examination of optometrists, and in 1986 power of examination for dispensing opticians was surrendered to the Association of British Dispensing Opticians (ABDO).

Now, the Spectacle Makers' Company is a membership organisation working across vision care and sight loss. There are over 800 members in 17 different countries. The Spectacle Makers' Charity (registered Charity in England and Wales no.1186122) supports charities improving the quality of life for people with impaired vision, as well as research in the field of optics and bursaries for aspiring optical technicians, orthoptists, optometrists, dispensing opticians, ophthalmic nurses and optical imaging professionals.

== Coat of arms ==
Coat of arms of Worshipful Company of Spectacle Makers
Crest On a wreath Or and vert, Two arms embowed vested vert cuffed Or, the hands proper holding a sun in splendour within an annulet gold. Escutcheon Vert, a chevron Or between three pairs of nose-spectacles proper, framed of the second. Supporters On either side a falcon proper belied Or charged with a sword erect gules.
