= Worshipful Company of Coachmakers and Coach Harness Makers =

Livery company of the City of London

The Worshipful Company of Coachmakers and Coach Harness Makers is one of the Livery Companies of the City of London. An organisation of Coachmakers and Wheelwrights petitioned for incorporation in 1630. The petition was granted almost fifty years later, in 1677, when a Royal Charter was granted to the Coachmakers. (The Wheelwrights were separately incorporated in 1670.) As coaches have been replaced by cars, the Coachmakers' and Coach Harness Makers' Company has lost its role as a body responsible for controlling the quality of coaches. Instead, it promotes the automobile industry, and also supports various charities.

The Coachmakers' and Coach Harness Makers' Company ranks seventy-second in the order of precedence for Livery Companies. Its motto is Surgit Post Nubila Phœbus, Latin for The Sun Rises After The Clouds.

== See also ==
- Coachbuilder
- Coach (carriage)
- Horse harness
