= Worshipful Company of Innholders =

Livery company of the City of London

Coordinates: 51.51080°N 0.09146°W

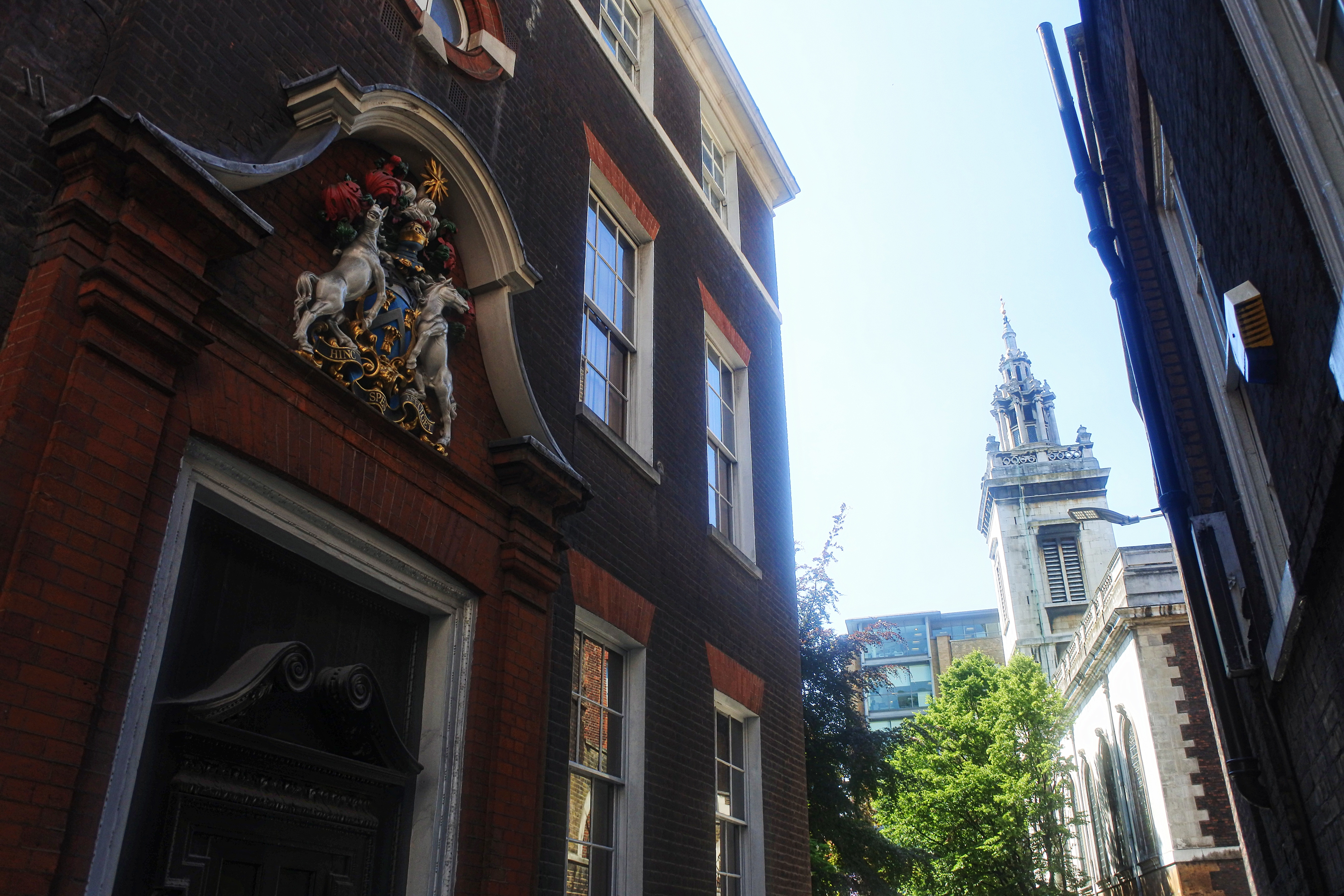
Innholders' Hall in College Street, near Cannon Street station, with St Michael Paternoster Royal in the background

The Worshipful Company of Innholders is one of the 114 livery companies of the City of London.

The innholders were originally known as hostellers, but their name had changed by the time it was incorporated under a royal charter in 1514. The company has, over the years, lost its status as an association of traders and businessmen, instead becoming, as have most of the other ancient livery companies, an establishment dedicated primarily to charity.

The Innholders' Company ranks 32nd in the order of precedence of all the livery companies. Its motto is Hinc Spes Affulget, Latin for Hence Hope Shines Forth, and it is based at Innholders' Hall in College Street, between Cannon Street and Upper Thames Street.

== Gallery ==
Worshipful Company of Innholders: Hinc Spes Affulget (Hence Hope Shines Forth)

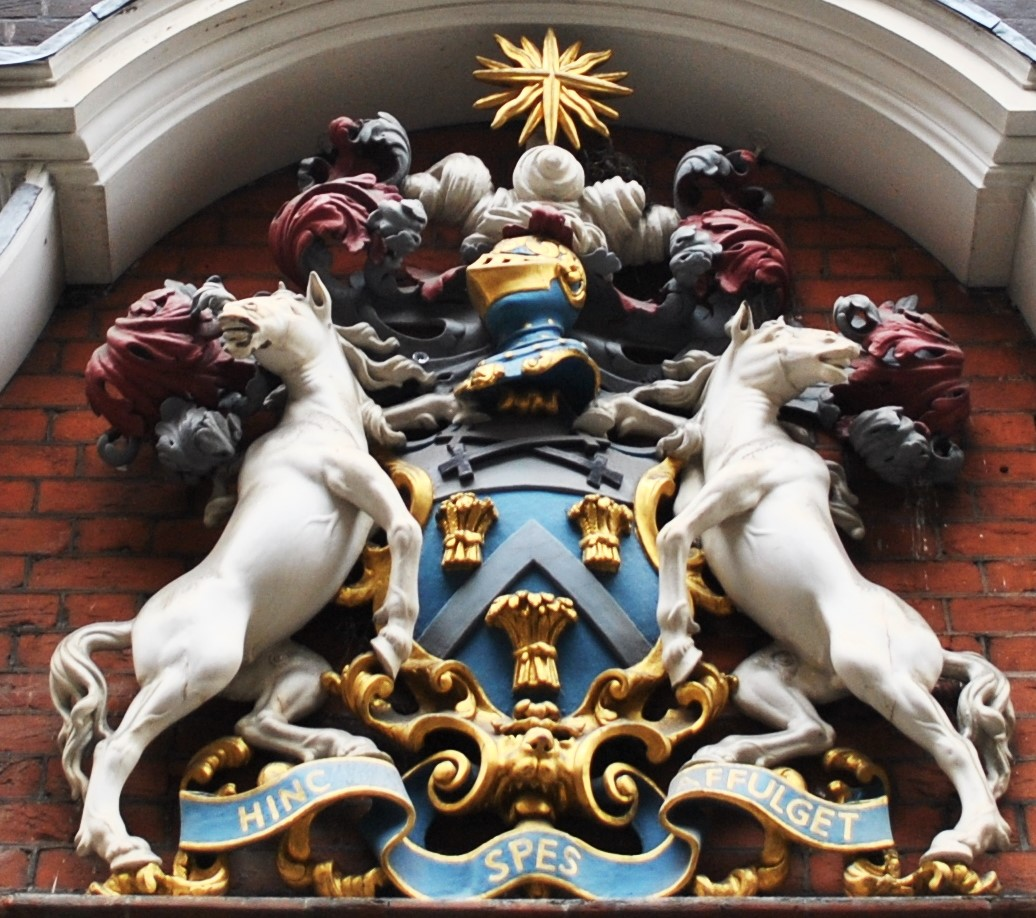
Worshipful Company of Innholders: Hinc Spes Affulget (Hence Hope Shines Forth)

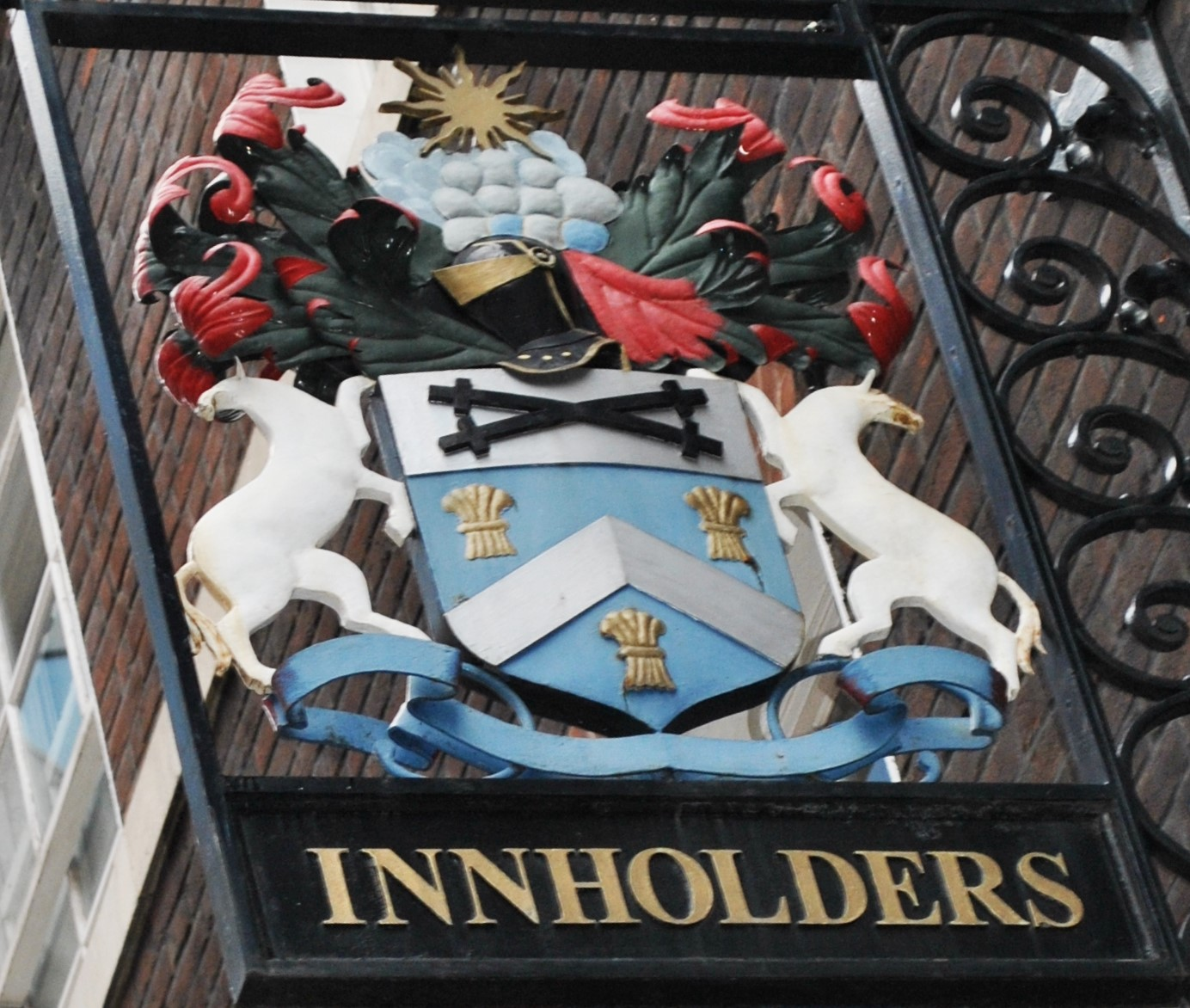
Worshipful Company of Innholders: Hinc Spes Affulget (Hence Hope Shines Forth)

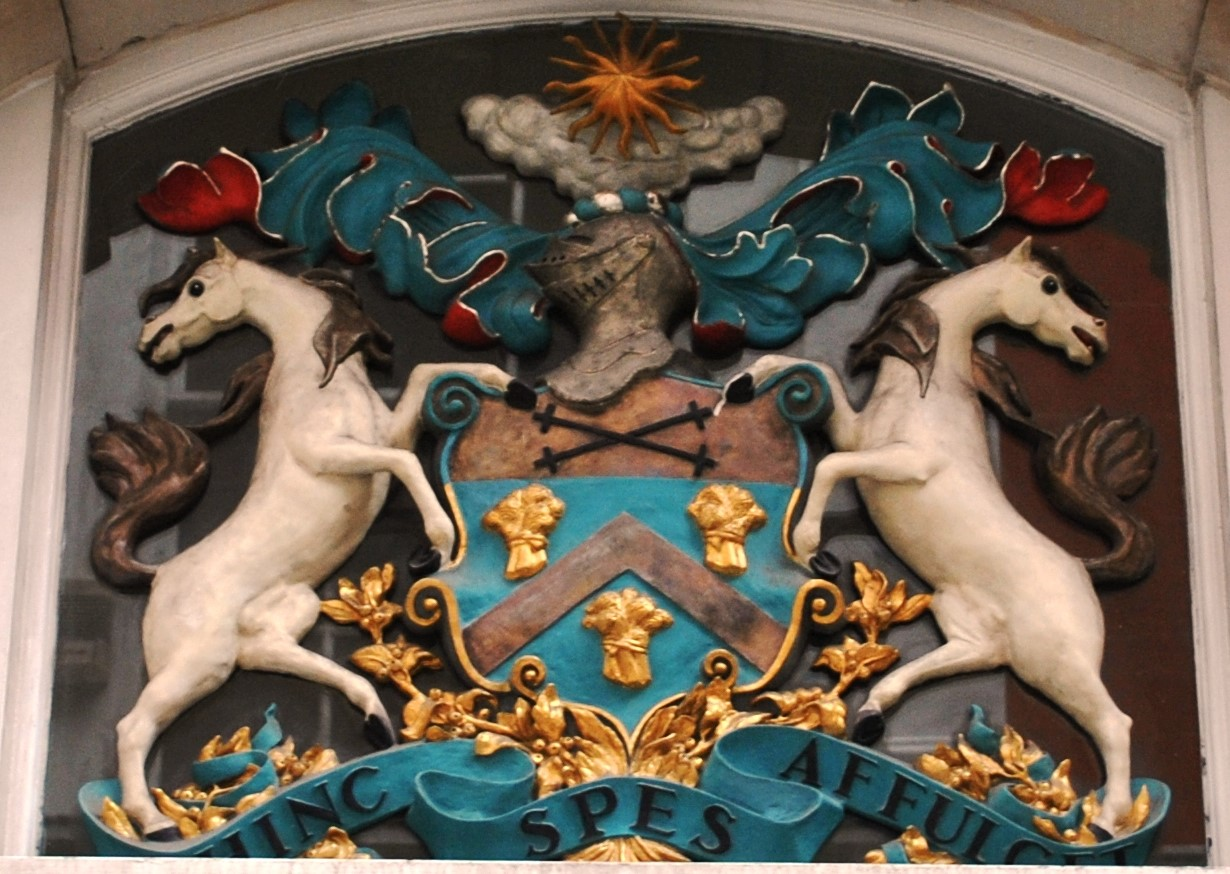
Worshipful Company of Innholders: Hinc Spes Affulget (Hence Hope Shines Forth)

== See also ==
- Licensed Trade Charity
