= Worshipful Company of Gold and Silver Wyre Drawers =

Livery company of the City of London

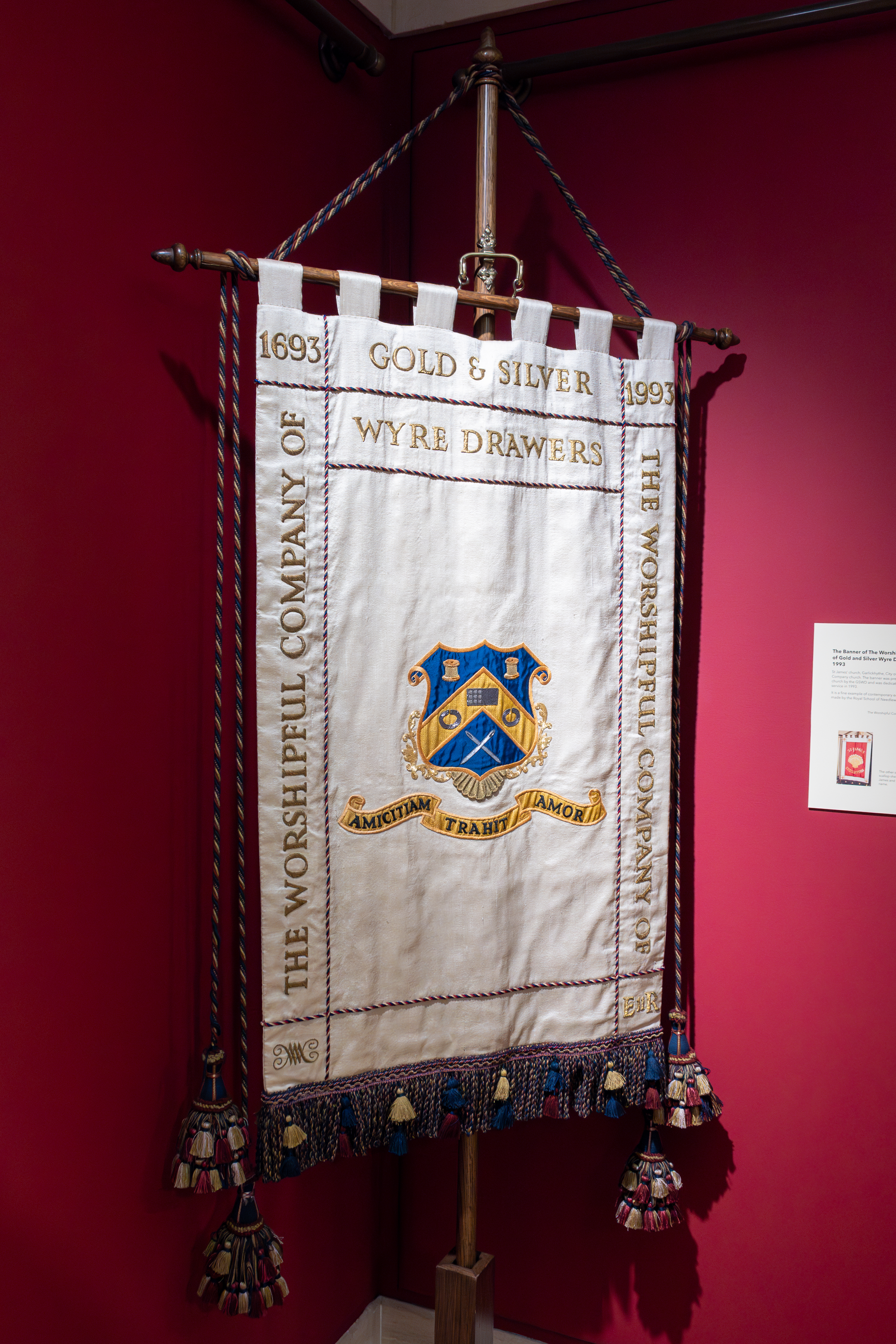
Banner of the company

The Worshipful Company of Gold and Silver Wyre Drawers is one of the livery companies of the City of London. The Gold and Silver Wyre Drawers were incorporated by royal charter in 1693; the City granted it the status of a livery company in 1780. The craft originally associated with the company, namely the making of gold and silver thread for uniforms or ceremonial clothing, has declined but is still practised. Thus nowadays the company functions mainly as a charitable body.

The Gold and Silver Wyre Drawers' Company ranks seventy-fourth in the order of precedence of City livery companies. Its motto is Amicitiam Trahit Amor, Latin for Love leads to friendship – or, more literally, "love draws friendship", a punning reference to the guild's ancient craft.

The Gold and Silver Wyre Drawers' Company also has an associated Masonic Lodge, consecrated on 29 October 1945, membership of which is open only to Liverymen of the company, its motto being "The Lodge of Love and Friendship", a play on words of the ancient livery company's motto.
