= Worshipful Company of Cutlers =

Livery company of the City of London

Coordinates: 51°30.93′N 0°6.056′W

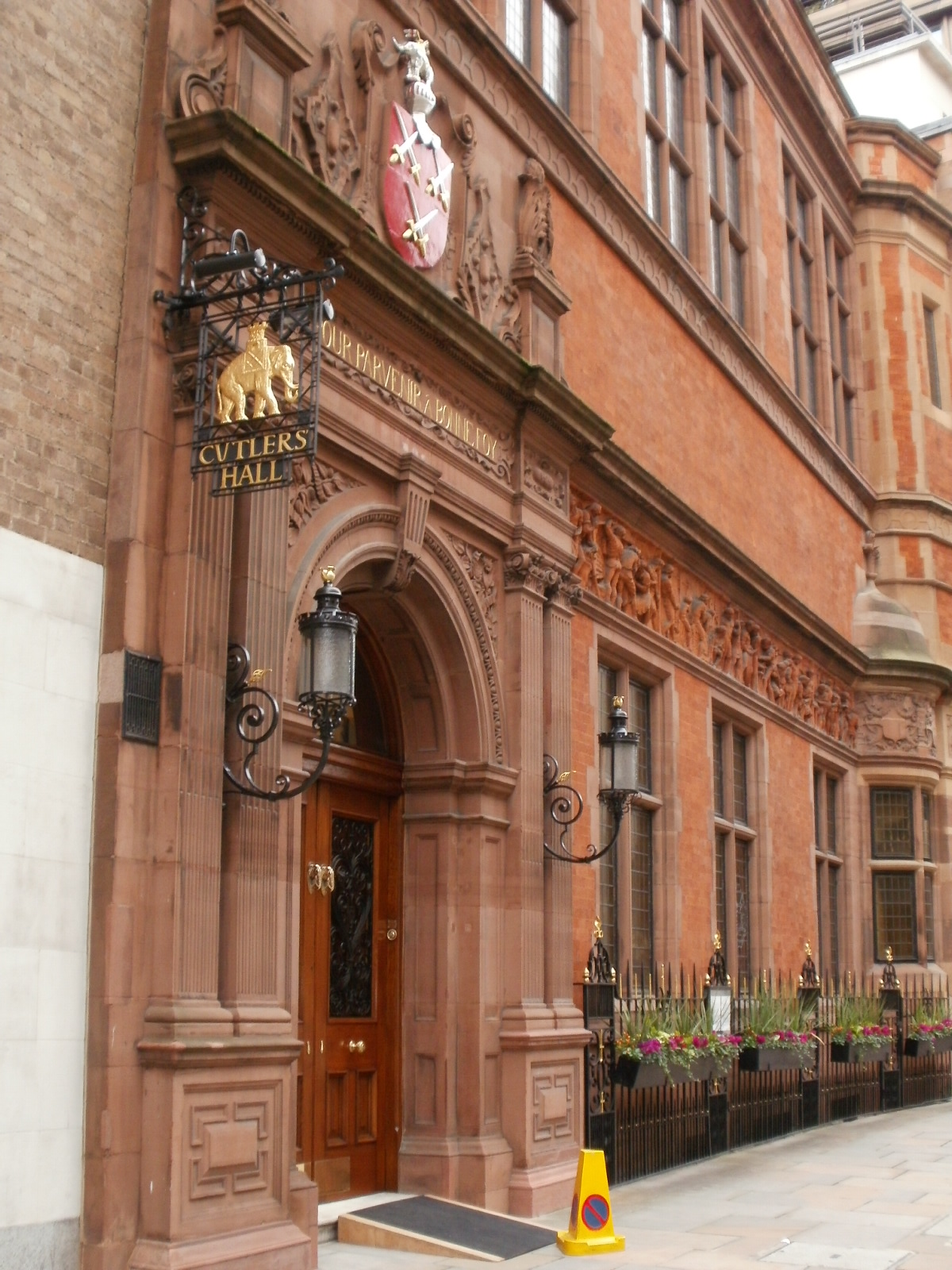
- Motto: Pour parvenir a bonne foy
- Location: Cutlers' Hall, 4 Warwick Lane, London EC4M 7BR
- Date of formation: 13c
- Order of precedence: 18th
- Master of company: Ian Sabin FRCS
- Website: www.cutlerslondon.co.uk

The Worshipful Company of Cutlers is one of the ancient Livery Companies of the City of London, ranking 18th in order of precedence.

The trade of knife-making and repairing in London became established by the thirteenth century forming a guild before receiving a Royal Charter in 1416. The Cutlers' Company, like many other City livery companies, no longer has a strong connection with its trade, which for the most part relocated north to Yorkshire, where an associated organisation, the Company of Cutlers in Hallamshire was established in the 17th century. Thus, the Cutlers' Company is nowadays primarily a charitable institution, funding and administering a variety of educational initiatives such as scholarships and awards.

== Heraldry and history ==
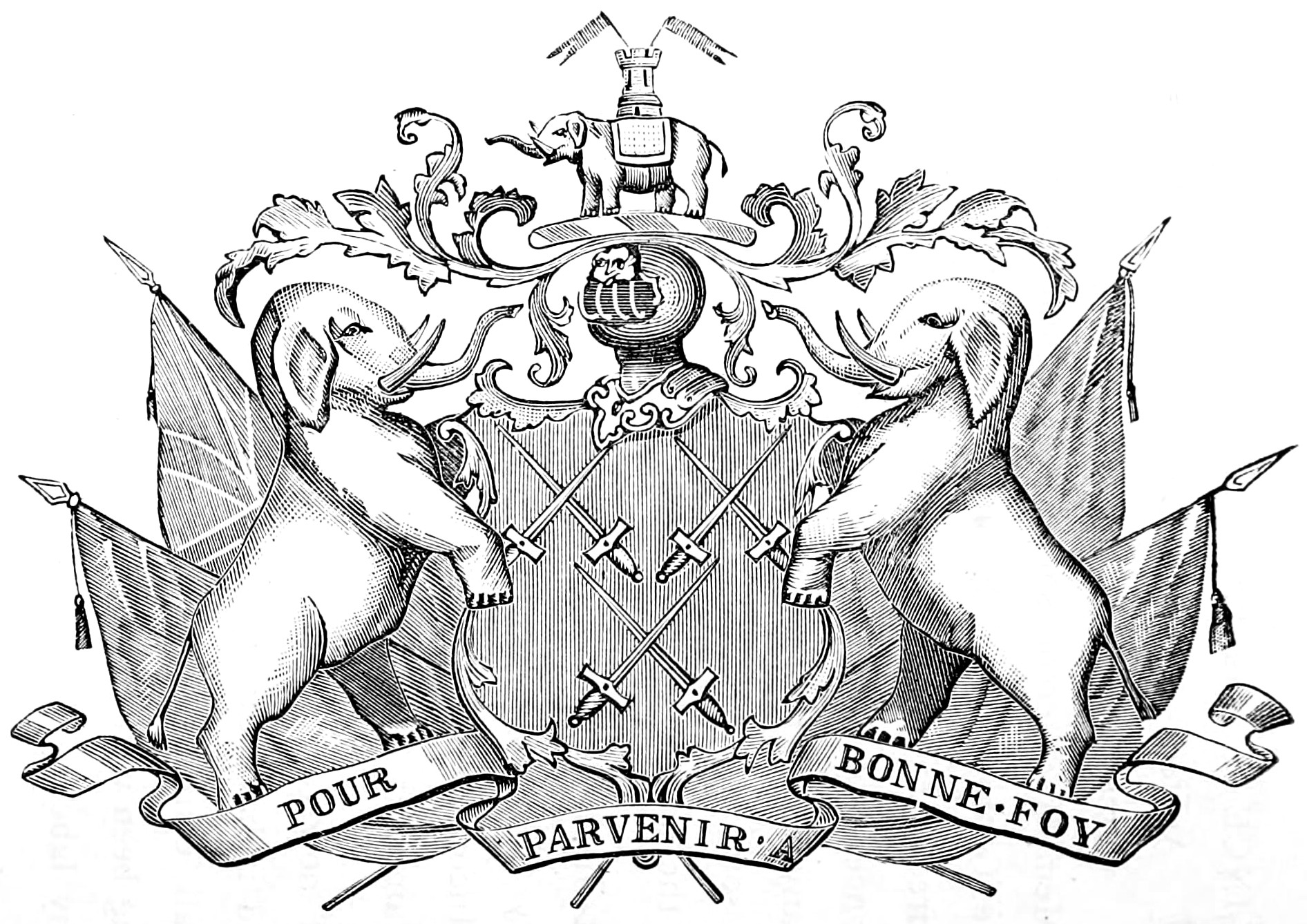
Arms of the Cutlers' Company

John Stowe recorded that the arms of the Cutlers' Company of London ("Gules three Pairs of Swords in saltire Argent hilts and pommels Or) were granted in 1476 by Sir Thomas Holme, Clarenceux King of Arms, and a crest ("An Elephant Argent armed and bearing a Castle Or") by a successor Clarenceux, Robert Cooke. Its heraldic supporters are two elephants.

The Company's motto was originally Pervenir a bonne foy later becoming Pour parvenir a bonne foy, an Anglo-Norman phrase meaning To succeed through good faith.

It was believed that the former Cutlers' Inn at Walworth, which displayed as its sign the elephant and castle crest, gave rise to the area now known as Elephant and Castle. In correspondence with a 'contributor', the Clerk to the Cutlers' Company denied knowledge of any connection with the locality. Meanwhile a historian of the Elephant and Castle area asserts that Elephant and Castle was a common public house name, and the eponymous district of London simply acquired its name in a happenstance fashion from that establishment.

Surrey landowner, Symon Newenton, was twice Master Cutler in the late 15th century. 20th-century Masters of the Cutlers' Company include Sir Horace Boot, Sheriff (for 1940/41) and Alan Mais, Baron Mais, Lord Mayor of London (for 1972/73).

The Company's livery hall is situated on Warwick Lane off Newgate Street, a site once occupied by the Royal College of Physicians. Cutlers' Hall opened in 1888 to the design of the Company's surveyor T. Tayler Smith, son of Thomas Smith (1798–1875) the celebrated architect from Newington Butts. It is a brick building, the façade decorated with a terracotta frieze depicting the processes of knife-making by the sculptor Benjamin Creswick, who had worked as a knife-grinder in Sheffield.

== Gallery ==
Cutlers' escutcheon

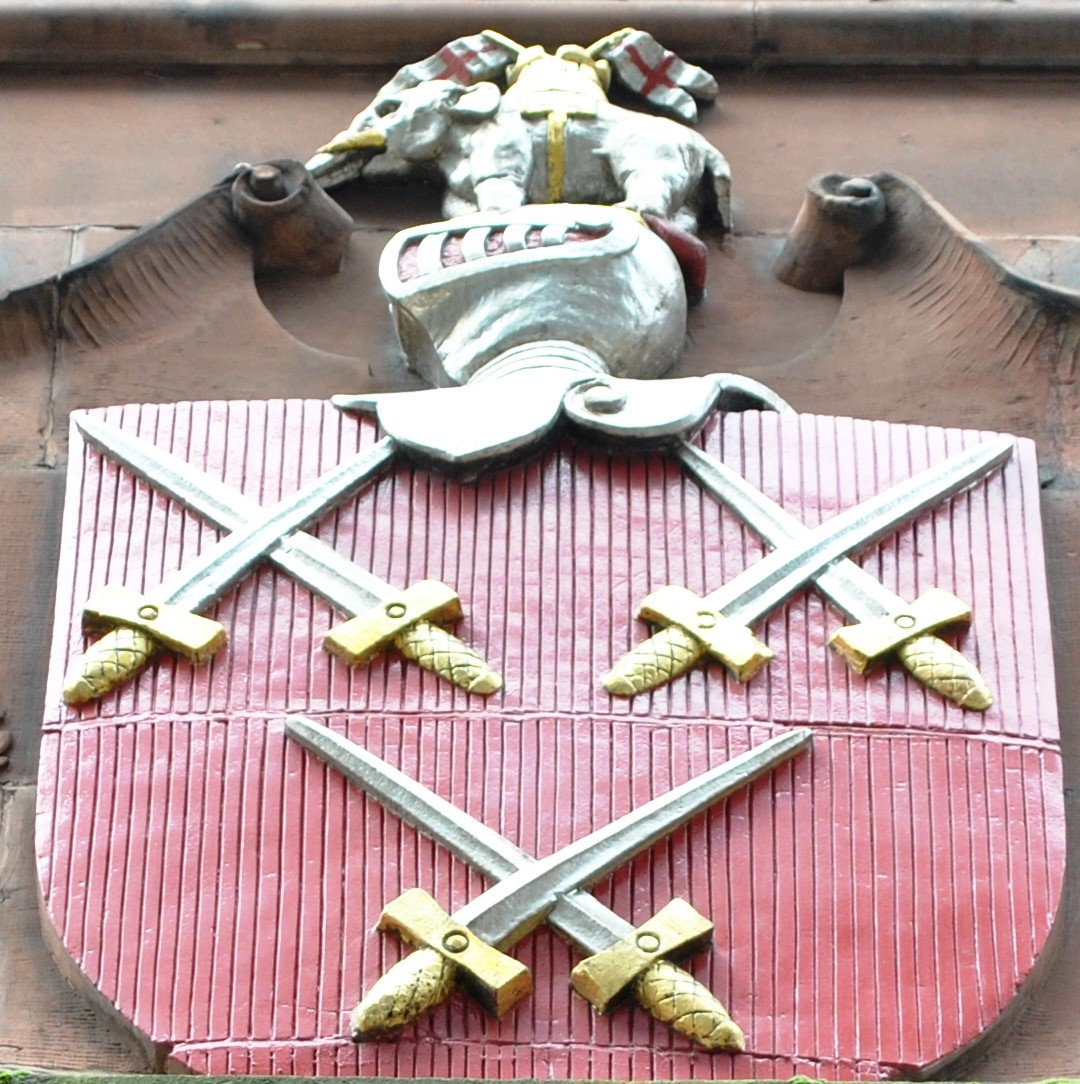
Cutlers' arms and crest

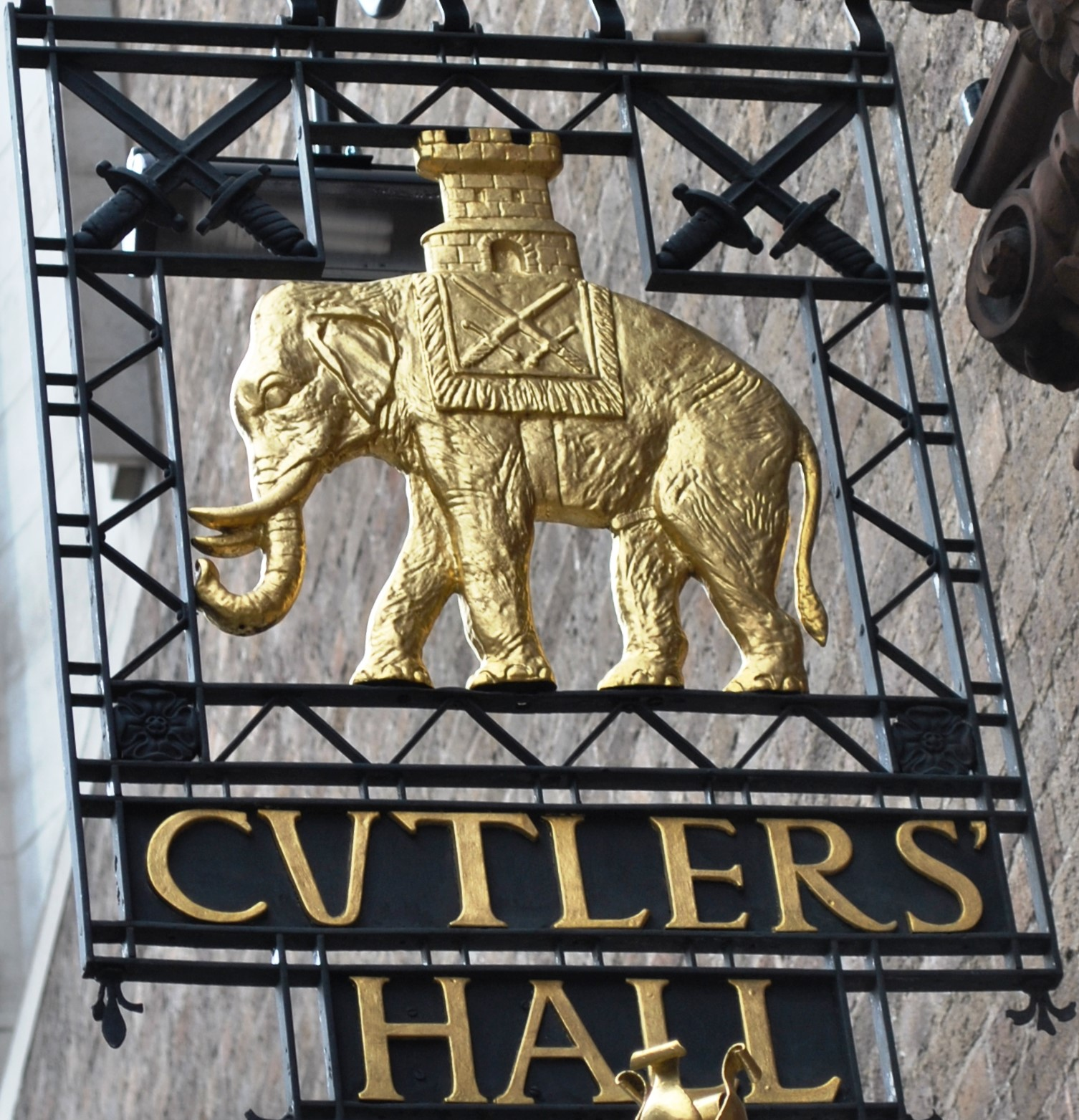
Cutlers' Hall emblem

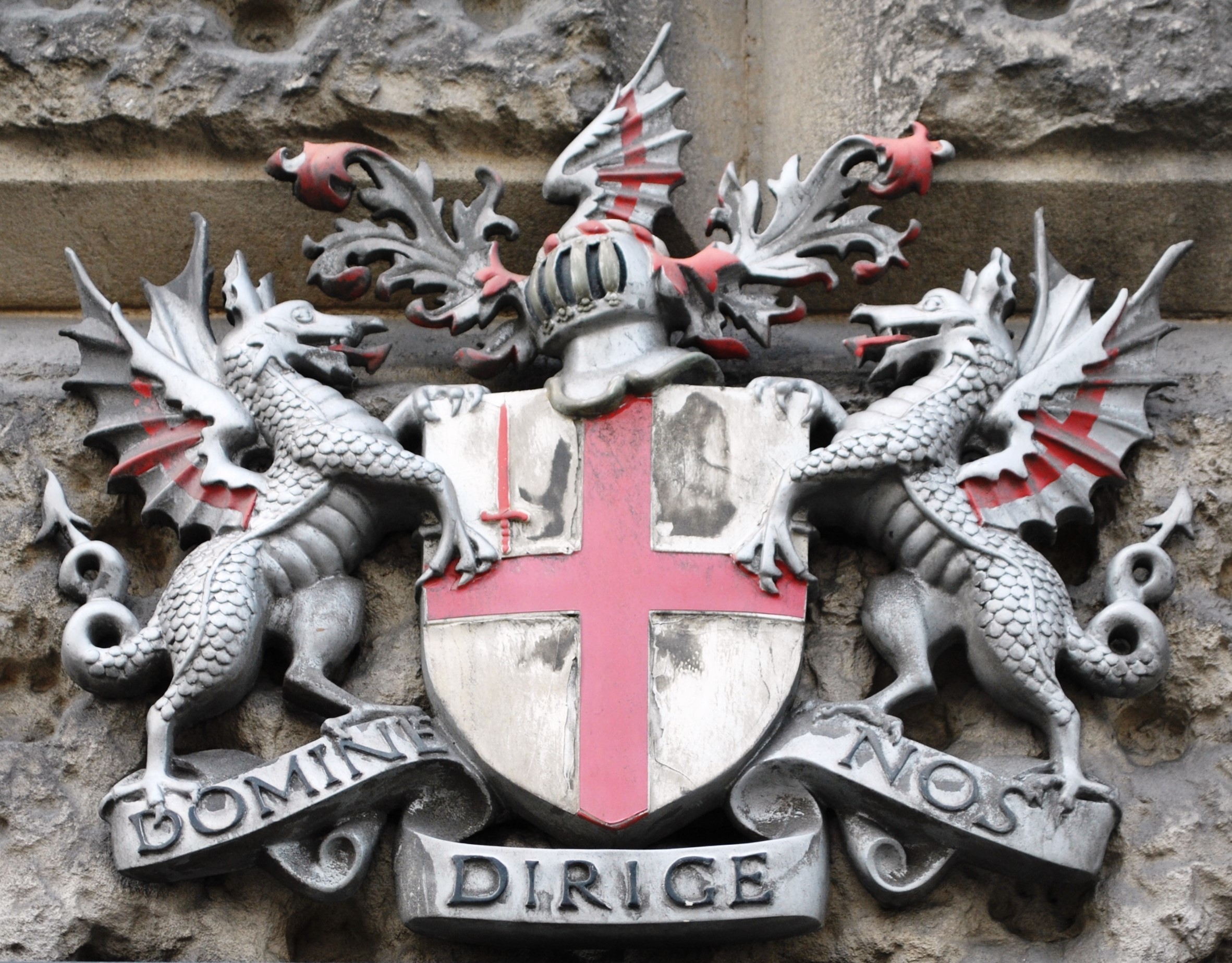
The City's arms depicted outside Cutlers' Hall
