= Worshipful Company of Loriners =

Livery company of the City of London

- Date of formation: 1261
- Company association: Equestrianism
- Order of precedence: 57th
- Master of company: Mary-Jane Atkinson (2021)
- Website: www.loriner.co.uk

The Worshipful Company of Loriners is one of the ancient Livery Companies of the City of London. The organisation was originally a trade association for makers of metal parts for bridles, harnesses, spurs and other horse apparel; hence the company's name, which comes from the Latin word lorum through the French word lormier.

== History ==
The company's first ordinances originate from 1261, which predate those of any other existing livery company, although its current ordinances were issued in 1741. The company was incorporated by a royal charter of 1711 in the reign of Queen Anne. It ranks fifty-seventh in the order of precedence of City Livery Companies. The Loriners' Company is permitted (by the Court of Aldermen) a Livery complement of up to 500 and currently comprises over 400 members (including assistants, liverymen, freemen and apprentices).

Whilst no longer authorised to regulate lorinery business throughout the London area, the company still administers examinations for students of its trade within the United Kingdom. It also acts as a charitable body.

The Loriners' coat of arms is Azure on a Chevron Argent, between three Manage-bits Or, as many Bosses Sable, supported asymmetrically by a single Horse, between Foliage of Palm and of Juniper. Mottoes, not being subject to the laws of English heraldry, have sometimes encouraged masters of the company to display a family motto with the company's arms, thus the company has no established motto.

== Notable members ==
The Master Loriner for 1992-93 was Anne, Princess Royal. Many other well known equestrians belong to its number including Captain Mark Phillips CVO and Samuel Vestey (Master of the Horse).
