= Worshipful Company of Wheelwrights =

Livery company of the City of London

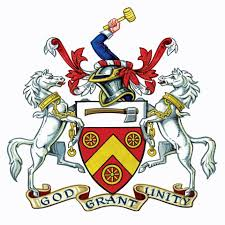
- Motto: God Grant Unity
- Date of formation: 3 February 1670
- Company association: Wheels & Mobility
- Order of precedence: 68th
- Master of company: David Mortlock
- Website: www.wheelwrights.org

The Worshipful Company of Wheelwrights is one of the Livery Companies of the City of London, England.

An organisation of Wheelwrights and Coachmakers petitioned for incorporation in 1630. The petition was granted forty years later, in 1670, when a royal charter was granted to the Wheelwrights. (The Coachmakers were separately incorporated in 1677.) The Wheelwrights' Company was granted the status of a Livery Company in 1763. Over the years, wheel making has largely changed from being hand-made by craftsmen to being made by machines. Whilst there are a number of working wheelwrights still practising the ancient craft, which the company actively supports through its apprenticeship scheme, the company is no longer a trade association for wheelwrights. Instead, it functions largely as a charitable body focusing on mobility.

The Wheelwrights' Company ranks sixty-eighth in the order of precedence for Livery Companies. Its motto is God Grant Unity.

== See also ==
- Wheelwrights
