= List of organisations with a British royal charter =

This is a list of organisations with a British royal charter. It includes organisations in the United Kingdom and elsewhere, in chronological order, that have received a royal charter from an English, Scottish, or British monarch.

The list of organisations in the United Kingdom with a royal charter is an alphabetical list of organisations in the UK.

== Table ==
Day and month	Year	Name	Notes	Date sealed	Reference
	1067	Mayor and Commonalty and Citizens of the City of London	City of London Corporation		
17 November	1155	Weavers' Company	(See also under 1707 below)		
	1231	University of Cambridge			
	1248	University of Oxford			
	1272	Saddlers' Company			
	1282	Bridge House Estates			
28 May	1284	Peterhouse, Cambridge			
10 March	1326	Merchant Taylors' Company			
1 March	1327	Skinners' Company			
	1327	Goldsmiths' Company			
6 August	1348	Dean and Canons of Windsor			
	1348	Gonville and Caius College, Cambridge			
30 June	1379	New College, Oxford			
	1382	Winchester College			
13 January	1393	Mercers' Company			
4 December	1416	Cutlers' Company			
16 February	1428	Grocers' Company			
22 February	1437	Brewers' Company			
23 August	1437	Vintners' Company			
26 April	1439	Cordwainers' Company			
	1444	Leathersellers' Company			
8 May	1453	Armourers' Company			
13 October	1457	Magdalen College, Oxford			
8 March	1462	Tallow Chandlers' Company			
	1462	Barbers' Company			
20 March	1463	Ironmongers' Company			
16 February	1471	Dyers' Company			
20 January	1473	Pewterers Company			
	1474	Corporation of Blacksmiths of Dublin			
16 August	1475	St Catharine's College, Cambridge			
7 July	1477	Carpenters' Company			
16 February	1483	Wax Chandlers' Company			
	1496	Jesus College, Cambridge			
10 March	1501	Plaisterers' Company			
29 April	1501	Coopers' Company			
23 February	1504	Poulters' Company			
1 July	1505	Royal College of Surgeons of Edinburgh			
22 July	1509	Bakers' Company			
15 January	1512	Brasenose College, Oxford			
	1517	Corpus Christi College, Oxford			
23 September	1518	Royal College of Physicians of London			
18 January	1528	Clothworkers' Company			
	1532	Bristol Grammar School			
25 August	1537	Honourable Artillery Company			
	1541	King's Ely	The school's first Royal Charter		
19 January	1542	College of Christ of Brecknock			
	1542	Magdalene College, Cambridge			
23 July	1545	King Henry VIII School, Coventry			
	1545	Warwick School			
	1546	Colyton Grammar School			
	1547	Trinity College, Cambridge			
	1547	Norwich School			
13 January	1547	Bethlem Hospital			
13 January	1547	Saint Bartholomew's Hospital			
	1549	Pembroke College, Cambridge			
13 May	1550	Sherborne School			
	1550	French Protestant Church of London Charities			
12 August	1551	St Thomas' Hospital			
14 May	1552	Sedbergh School			
17 June	1552	King Edward VI Grammar School, Stourbridge			
12 July	1552	King Edward's School, Bath			
18 December	1552	Society of Merchant Venturers of Bristol			
	1552	Bedford School			
	1552	King Edward's School, Birmingham			
25 April	1552	King Edward VI Free Grammar School (King's School), Macclesfield	1. The Governors of the Possessions, Revenues and Goods of the Free Grammar School (King's School) (Macclesfield); 2. Foundation of Sir John Percyvale in 1502, refounded by King Edward VI in 1552 with (King Edward VI Free Grammar School Macclesfield)		
26 May	1553	Giggleswick School			
26 June	1553	Bridewell Hospital			
26 June	1553	Christ's Hospital			
	1553	King Edward VI Grammar School, Southampton			
	1553	Tonbridge School			
6 January	1554	Boston Grammar School, Lincolnshire			
	1554	Queen Mary's Grammar School, Walsall			
15 July	1555	College of Arms			
	1555	Muscovy Company			
	1555	St John's College, Oxford			
7 July	1556	Charity of the Priest and Poor of Ginge Petre in the County of Essex			
4 May	1557	Stationers' Company			
5 July	1558	Brentwood School, Essex			
21 May	1560	Westminster Abbey			
28 February	1561	Worcester School			
	1561	Kingston Grammar School			
25 October	1561	Broderers' Company			
	1562	Royal Grammar School High Wycombe			
	1562	St Olave's Grammar School			
	1562	King's Ely	The school's second Royal Charter		
15 June	1563	Queen Elizabeth Sixth Form College			
	1565	Exeter College, Oxford			
	1565	Highgate School			
	1567	Queen Elizabeth's Grammar School, Blackburn			
3 August	1568	Worshipful Company of Tylers and Bricklayers			
12 October	1568	Worshipful Company of Girdlers			
14 April	1570	Joiners' Company			
	1571	Blacksmiths' Company			
	1571	Harrow School			
27 June	1571	Jesus College, Oxford			
9 February	1573	University College, Oxford			
	1574	Cranbrook School			
25 November	1574	Queen Elizabeth's College, Greenwich			
	1576	Sutton Valence School			
	1577	Spanish Company			
19 June	1578	Haberdashers' Company			
	1579	Eastland Company			
	1579	Turkey Company of London			
19 July	1581	Painter Stainers' Company			
	1584	Uppingham School			
	1585	Queen's College, Oxford			
	1591	Queen Elizabeth Grammar School, Wakefield			
	1594	Sidney Sussex College, Cambridge			
3 May	1597	Hospital of St. John the Evangelist and St. Anne in Oakham			
29 November	1599	Royal College of Physicians and Surgeons of Glasgow			
22 March	1600	Royal Grammar School, Newcastle-upon-Tyne			
	1600	East India Company			
	1603	Oriel College, Oxford			
	1603	Hostmen of Newcastle upon Tyne			
30 August	1603	Fishmongers' Company			
17 December	1603	Bishop Auckland Grammar School			
2 August	1604	Feltmakers' Company			
29 August	1605	Woodmongers' Company			
16 September	1605	Butchers' Company			
18 September	1605	Gardeners' Company			
9 January	1606	Fruiterers' Company			
19 January	1606	Drapers' Company			C878
30 April	1606	Curriers' Company			
15 May	1607	Salters' Company			
	1610	Newfoundland Company			
12 April	1611	Plumbers' Company			
22 June	1611	Sutton's Hospital in Charterhouse			
20 December	1611	Wadham College, Oxford			
	1611	French Company			
	1612	Bermuda Company			
13 September	1612	Don Baudains (Jersey)			
	1613	The Honourable The Irish Society			
18 September	1614	Founders' Company			
	1615	Wilson's Grammar School			
28 January	1617	Scriveners' Company			
6 December	1617	Society of Apothecaries of London			
21 June	1619	Dulwich College			
21 June	1619	New River Company			
9 June	1621	Brown Bakers' Company			
	1621	Bowyers' Company			
13 May	1622	Starch Makers' Company			
	1624	Pembroke College, Oxford			
14 June	1626	Upholders' Company			
22 October	1628	Playing Card Makers' Company			
16 May	1629	Spectacle Makers' Company			
	1629	Massachusetts Company			
3 July	1630	Sion College			
8 July	1631	Sackville College			
22 August	1631	Clockmakers' Company			
4 April	1636	Comb Makers' Company			
20 August	1636	Pinmakers' Company			
14 March	1637	Gunmakers' Company			
12 January	1638	Horners' Company			
22 May	1638	Soap Makers' Company			
9 August	1638	Distillers' Company			
6 November	1638	Glaziers' Company			
10 September	1639	Glovers' Company			
27 February	1639	Worshipful Company of Parish Clerks			
10 November	1656	Needlemakers' Company			
13 June	1657	Worshipful Company of Framework Knitters			
28 November	1661	Glass Sellers' Company			
20 January	1662	Royal African Company			
7 February	1662	New England Company			
15 July	1662	Royal Society			
	1662	Bradford Grammar School			
16 February	1663	Cooks' Company			
21 December	1663	Innholders' Company			
17 March	1664	Canary Company			
30 June	1664	Royal Scottish Corporation			
1 December	1664	Hat-Band Makers' Company			
18 May	1666	Broadweavers and Clothiers' Company of Coventry			
	1666	King's Ely	The school's third Royal Charter		
3 February	1670	Wheelwrights' Company			
2 May	1670	Hudson's Bay Company			
2 August	1670	Pattenmakers' Company			
29 December	1670	Tin Plate Workers' Company			
18 November	1672	Trinity House in Kingston-Upon-Hull			
17 January	1674	Farriers' Company			
31 May	1677	Coachmakers' Company			
17 December	1677	Masons' Company			
1 July	1678	Corporation of the Sons of the Clergy			
19 October	1681	Company of Merchants of the City of Edinburgh			
8 July	1685	Corporation of the Trinity House of Deptford Strond			
16 June	1693	Gold and Silver Wyre Drawers' Company			
27 July	1694	Bank of England			
16 June	1701	Society for the Propagation of the Gospel in Foreign Parts			
15 July	1703	Tanners' Company of Bermondsey			
6 March	1704	The Royal Company of Archers			C889
26 April	1704	Company of the Mine Adventurers of England			
3 November	1704	Queen Anne's Bounty			
19 April	1706	Grey Coat Hospital			
27 July	1706	Amicable Society for a Perpetual Assurance Office			
17 November	1707	Weavers' Company			
22 December	1707	Charitable Corporation			
19 April	1709	Fanmakers' Company			
25 May	1709	Society in Scotland for Propagating Christian Knowledge			
23 May	1711	Blanket Weavers of Witney			
8 September	1711	South Sea Company			
3 December	1711	Loriners' Company			
29 July	1714	Worcester College, Oxford			
	1718	Greenwich Hospital, London			
24 July	1718	French Protestant Hospital			
27 July	1719	Music Society for Carrying on Operas and other Entertainments			
22 June	1720	London Assurance			
22 June	1720	Royal Exchange Assurance			
8 March	1723	Chelsea Waterworks Company			
21 November	1724	Equivalent Company			
31 May	1727	Royal Bank of Scotland Ltd			
31 July	1729	Queen Elizabeth Grammar School, Halifax			
23 October	1729	Company for working Mines etc. in Scotland			
17 October	1739	Foundling Hospital			
27 August	1740	Hertford College			
28 April	1741	Charity for the Relief of the Widows and Children of the Clergy of Norwich and Norfolk			
13 April	1742	Charity for the Relief of the Widows and Children of the Clergy of Suffolk			
25 June	1742	Orphan Hospital and Workhouse at Edinburgh			
5 July	1746	British Linen Bank			
29 April	1747	Governors of the Charity for the relief of the poor Widows and Orphans			
14 July	1748	Excise Incorporation in Scotland			
11 October	1750	Society of the Free British Fishery			
2 November	1751	Society of Antiquaries of London			
9 December	1758	London Hospital			
26 January	1765	Society of Artists of Great Britain			
8 June	1765	Bethel Hospital, Norwich			
19 June	1773	Carron Company			
22 June	1768	College of Doctors of Law			
	1773	Royal Medical Society			
27 January	1774	Society of Advocates in Aberdeen			
24 March	1781	Governors of the Possessions Revenues and Goods			
29 March	1783	Royal Society of Edinburgh			
6 May	1783	Society of Antiquaries of Scotland			
9 June	1783	Glasgow Chamber of Commerce and Manufactures			
10 July	1786	Edinburgh Chamber of Commerce and Manufactures			
17 May	1787	Royal Highland and Agricultural Society of Scotland			
26 August	1790	Royal Society of Musicians of Great Britain			
21 December	1791	Glasgow Royal Infirmary			
9 January	1792	Society for the Benefit of Sons and Daughters of the Clergy of the Church of Scotland			
6 March	1793	Inverness Royal Academy			
23 August	1793	Ministry of Agriculture, Fisheries and Food (United Kingdom)			
30 October	1794	Christian Faith Society			
6 June	1796	Royal Faculty of Procurators in Glasgow			
24 January	1797	Society of Solicitors in the Supreme Courts of Scotland			
29 June	1797	Corporation of the Trinity House of Leith			
	1798	Commercial Buildings Company of Dublin			
20 June	1798	Naval Knights of Windsor|			
28 June	1798	Ayr Academy			
13 January	1800	Royal Institution of Great Britain			
22 March	1800	Royal College of Surgeons of England			
5 July	1800	Sierra Leone Company			
22 September	1800	Downing College, Cambridge			
19 April	1801	James Gillespie's High School			
26 March	1802	Linnean Society of London			
12 May	1802	University of King's College, Halifax, Nova Scotia			
21 January	1807	London Institution			
7 April	1807	Dumfries and Galloway Royal Infirmary			
6 April	1809	Tain Royal Academy			
	1808	Commercial Buildings Company of Cork			
17 April	1809	Royal Horticultural Society			
30 April	1812	Gaslight and Coke Company			
23 May	1817	National Society for Promoting Religious Education			
13 January	1818	Royal Edinburgh Public Dispensary			
19 May	1818	Royal Literary Fund			C187
8 May	1819	Dundee Royal Infirmary			
	1820	Faculty of Procurators and Solicitors in Dundee			
3 February	1821	Hutchesons' Hall			
31 March	1821	McGill University			
24 November	1821	Liverpool Royal Institution			
6 February	1824	North British Insurance Company			
6 February	1824	Edinburgh Academy			
11 August	1824	Royal Asiatic Society			
14 October	1824	Royal Caledonian Horticultural Society			
1 November	1824	Australian Agricultural Company			
9 December	1824	Glasgow Royal Mental Hospital			
23 April	1825	Geological Society of London			
30 July	1825	Incorporated British, Irish and Colonial Silk Company			
15 September	1825	Royal Society of Literature of the United Kingdom			
10 November	1825	Van Diemen's Land Company			
23 February	1826	West India Company			
28 June	1826	The Equitable Life Assurance Society			
19 August	1826	Canada Company			
15 March	1827	University of Toronto			
2 August	1827	Society for the management and distribution of the Artists Fund			
30 April	1827	London Portable Gas Company			
6 February	1828	St David's College, Lampeter			
3 June	1828	Institution of Civil Engineers			
25 November	1828	Plymouth Union Bath Company			
27 March	1829	Zoological Society of London			
14 August	1829	King's College London			
16 July	1829	Haytor Granite Mining Company			
18 January	1830	General Lying-In Hospital			
25 January	1830	Schaw Bequest			
19-May	1830	Dundee Orphanage Trust			
23 June	1830	Royal Academy of Music			
22 November	1830	Mauritius Bank			
7 March	1831	Royal Astronomical Society			
2 March	1831	United General Gas Company			
5 August	1831	Commercial Bank of Scotland Ltd			
16 May	1832	Society for the Diffusion of Useful Knowledge			
6 August	1832	Cambridge Philosophical Society			
20 February	1834	New Brunswick and Nova Scotia Land Company			
20 March	1834	British American Land Company			
26 July	1834	Wearmouth Dock Company			
30 September	1834	Royal Medical and Chirurgical Society of London			
13 October	1834	Society for the illustration and encouragement of Practical Science			
3 May	1836	Society of Licensed Victuallers			
28 November	1836	University of London			
28 November	1836	University College, London			
13 April	1836	Colonial Bank			
11 January	1837	Royal Institute of British Architects			
1 June	1837	University of Durham			
7 June	1837	Company of Stationers of Glasgow			
11 November	1837	Millar and Peadie's School			
27 January	1838	Scottish Equitable Life Assurance Society			
26 April	1838	Royal Naval Benevolent Society			
13 August	1838	Royal Scottish Academy of Painting, Sculpture & Architecture			
23 August	1838	Polytechnic Institution			
6 September	1839	Royal Botanic Society of London			
10 April	1839	Insurance Company of Scotland			
26 August	1839	Mauritius Commercial Bank			
26 August	1839	Royal Mail Steam Packet Company			
26 March	1840	Royal Agricultural Society of England			
3 January	1840	Bank of British North America			
29 January	1840	Pacific Steam Navigation Company			
1 August	1840	Society of Solicitors of Banffshire			
10 August	1840	Bank of Ceylon			
11 September	1840	Australian Trust Company			
11 September	1840	West India Bank			
10 November	1840	P&O			
12 February	1841	New Zealand Company			
16 March	1841	Bank of Australasia			
26 April	1841	Life Association of Scotland			
19 June	1841	Murdoch's Boys' School			
16 October	1841	Queen's University at Kingston, Ontario			
16 March	1842	McLachlan's Free School			
30 June	1842	Artists General Benevolent Institution			
15 December	1842	Licensed Victuallers Asylum			
11 August	1842	British Plate Glass Company (granted for one year)			
18 February	1843	Pharmaceutical Society of Great Britain			
3 April	1843	Royal Grammar School, Worcester			
27 April	1843	Queen Elizabeth's Almshouses Worcester			
17 July	1843	Queen's College, Birmingham			
18 January	1844	Ionian Bank			
8 March	1844	Royal College of Veterinary Surgeons			
4 June	1844	Irish Reproductive Loan Fund Institution			
26 February	1845	The Law Society			
21 August	1845	Marlborough College			
13 January	1845	Trust and Loan Company of Upper Canada			
3 February	1845	Agricultural College, Cirencester			
30 June	1845	Metropolitan Association for Improving the Dwellings of the Industrious Classes			
8 August	1845	Preston Banking Company			
	1845	Queen's University, Belfast			
20 November	1845	Smyrna Bank			
18 March	1846	Trust Company			
6 April	1846	British Whale and Seal Fishery Company			
19 May	1846	General Mining Association (Nova Scotia and Cape Breton)			
30 October	1846	Art Union of London			
30 October	1846	British West India Company			
14 November	1846	Exchange Bank of Scotland			
3 February	1847	Royal Society of British Artists			
27 February	1847	Southern and Western Mining Company of Ireland			
20 May	1847	Royal Society of Arts			
20 May	1847	India and Australia Mail Steam Packet Company			
17 June	1847	Eastern Archipelago Company			
17 June	1847	Great Southern and Eastern Steam Packet Company			
17 June	1847	Valentia Slab Company in Ireland			
22 July	1847	South Australian Banking Company			
22 July	1847	General Screw Steam Shipping Company			
22 November	1847	Association for the Promotion of Fine Arts in Scotland			
2 March	1848	Royal Irish Fisheries Company			
2 March	1848	Southern Whale Fishery Company			
8 May	1848	Governesses Benevolent Institution	"Schoolmistresses and Governesses Benevolent Institution"		
27 June	1848	Missionary College of Saint Augustine Canterbury	"St Augustine's Foundation"		
4 September	1848	Chemical Society			
31 October	1848	Irish Amelioration Society			
16 December	1848	College of Preceptors	"College of Teachers"		
1 March	1849	Warneford Lunatic Asylum (Oxford)			
1 May	1849	Canterbury Association for Founding a Settlement in New Zealand			
30 July	1849	Royal British Bank			
5 September	1849	Banbury Banking Company			
8 January	1850	The Royal Panopticon of Science and Art			
14 August	1850	Commissioners for the Exhibition of 1851			
14 August	1850	Society for Improving the Condition of the Labouring Classes	"1830 Housing Society"		
12 December	1850	Royal College of Surgeons of Edinburgh			
7 March	1851	British and Irish Peat Company			
14 April	1851	Submarine Telegraph Company	"Submarine Telegraph Company between Great Britain and the Continent of Europe"		
5 May	1851	Educational Institute of Scotland			
25 June	1851	Eastern Steam Navigation Company			
7 August	1851	Oriental Bank Corporation			
7 August	1851	Great Peat Working Company of Ireland			
7 August	1851	South American and General Steam Navigation Company			
23 October	1851	Falkland Islands Company			
23 October	1851	Leith Chamber of Commerce			
16 July	1852	University of Trinity College, Toronto, Ontario			
8 December	1852	Laval University, Quebec			
2 February	1852	Irish Beet Sugar Company			
2 February	1852	West of Ireland Land Investment Company			
5 March	1852	Colonial Gold Company			
5 March	1852	Australian Royal Mail Steam Navigation Company			
5 March	1852	Irish Land Company			
5 April	1852	English and Irish Magnetic Telegraph Company			
5 April	1852	General Theatrical Fund Association	"The Royal Theatrical Fund"		
15 May	1852	Irish Submarine Telegraph Company			
15 May	1852	English Company for Working Mines in Ireland			
15 June	1852	Australasian Gold Mining Company			
15 June	1852	Port Philip and Colonial Gold Mining Company			
30 June	1852	President and Managers of the Infirmary of Aberdeen			
30 June	1852	African Steamship Company			
18 August	1852	Liverpool and Australian Navigation Company			
18 August	1852	Australasian Pacific Mail Steam Packet Company			
16 October	1852	London Chartered Bank of Australia			
10 November	1852	Liverpool and African Screw Steam Carrying Company			
10 November	1852	English, Scottish and Australian Chartered Bank			
28 December	1852	Crystal Palace Company			
28 January	1853	Bishops College, Lennoxville, Quebec as well as Bishop's College School then as its affiliated institute			
13 December	1853	Wellington College			
4 January	1853	Bucks and Oxon Union Bank			
13 June	1853	Australian Direct Steam Navigation Company via Panana			
13 June	1853	British Telegraph Company			
13 June	1853	East Indian Iron Company			
13 June	1853	Council and Committee of Queen's College	"Queen's College London"		
13 June	1853	International Telegraph Company			
8 August	1853	Friend of the Clergy			
19 August	1853	Chartered Bank of Asia			
19 August	1853	Chartered Bank of India, Australia and China	"Standard Chartered Bank"		
7 April	1854	Marylebone Association for Improving the Dwellings of the Industrious Classes			
7 April	1854	City of Worcester Association for Building Dwellings for the Labouring Classes			
13 September	1854	Society of Accountants in Edinburgh	"Institute of Chartered Accountants of Scotland"		
18 October	1854	London and Eastern Banking Corporation			
8 February	1855	Institute of Accountants and Actuaries in Glasgow			
8 February	1855	Australian Mining Company			
21 May	1855	Manchester and Salford Baths and Laundries Company			
21 May	1855	Bank of London			
6 June	1855	Colonial Fibre Company			
26 June	1855	City Bank			
21 July	1855	Salopian Society for Improving the Dwellings of the Industrious Classes			
21 November	1855	South Australia Company			
7 December	1855	President and Managers of the Aberdeen Asylum for the Blind			
7 December	1855	Banque Misr			
25 February	1856	Unity Joint Stoke Mutual Banking Association			
4 April	1856	Ottoman Bank			
28 April	1856	Western Bank of London			
28 April	1856	London and Paris Joint Stock Bank			
7 February	1857	Society of Procurators and Solicitors in the City and Country of Perth			
12 July	1857	Hospital for Women			
6 May	1857	Agra and United Service Bank			
27 August	1857	Chartered Mercantile Bank of India, London and China			
3 February	1858	University of Sydney			
14 March	1859	University of Melbourne			
11 January	1859	Royal Geographical Society			
18 April	1859	Royal Dramatic College			
6 July	1859	Benevolent Institution for the Relief of Aged and Infirm Journeymen Tailors			
23 September	1859	National Benevolent Institution, founded by the late Peter Herve			
22 October	1859	High School of Dundee			
23 January	1860	Royal United Service Institution	"Royal United Services Institute for Defence"		
7 March	1860	Royal National Life Boat Institution for the Preservation of Life from Shipwreck			
26 October	1860	London and South African Bank			
4 February	1861	Commissioners for the Exhibition of 1862			
5 August	1861	Royal College of Physicians of Edinburgh			
20 November	1861	Glasgow Art Union			
26 April	1862	Bank of British Columbia			
19 July	1862	Salisbury Infirmary			
1 November	1862	Asylum for Idiots	"Royal Earlswood Institution for Mental Defectives"		
1 November	1862	Saint Andrew's College, Bradfield			
3 February	1864	Commercial Bank Corporation of India and the East			
3 February	1864	Asiatic Banking Corporation			
3 February	1864	Dundee Chamber of Commerce	"Dundee and Tayside Chamber of Commerce and Industry"		
3 February	1864	Royal Orthopaedic Hospital			
3 February	1864	Society for Relief of Widows and Orphans of Medical Men			
7 April	1864	Natal Native Trust			
7 April	1864	Department of Science and Art			
9 July	1864	Friend of the Clergy			
9 July	1864	Albert Memorial College in Suffolk	"Framlingham College"		
28 July	1864	Haileybury College	"Haileybury and Imperial Service College"		
1 November	1864	Printers' Pension, Almshouse and Orphan Asylum Corporation	"Printers' Charitable Corporation"		
5 December	1865	Meteorological Society	"Royal Meteorological Society"		
24 March	1866	Glasgow Magdalene Institution			
9 May	1866	Corporation for Middle Class Education in the Metropolis and the Suburbs thereof			
26 July	1866	Microscopical Society	"Royal Microscopical Society"		
28 December	1866	Corporation of the Hall of Arts and Sciences (Royal Albert Hall)			
26 February	1867	Preceptor, Patrons and Directors of Baillie's Institution in Glasgow			
4 March	1867	Society of Accountants in Aberdeen			
17 May	1867	Poor Clergy Relief Society	"Poor Clergy Relief Corporation"		
4 November	1867	Association for the Protection of Commercial Interests as respects Wrecked and Damaged Property	"Salvage Association"		
30 July	1868	Crossley Orphan Home and School	"Crossley and Porter Orphan Home and School"		
14 September	1868	Faculty of Actuaries in Scotland	Surrendered 21 July 2010	Merged with Institute and Faculty of Actuaries	
4 June	1870	Keble College, Oxford			
6 July	1871	Incorporated Lay Body of the Church of England in Jamaica			
17 March	1875	Royal Veterinary College			
13 May	1875	Dundee Royal Lunatic Asylum			
27 June	1876	University of New Zealand			
23 October	1876	North of England Institute of Mining and Mechanical Engineers			
7 February	1877	Clifton College			
11 July	1877	University of the Cape of Good Hope	"University of South Africa"		
18 March	1880	Victoria University	"Victoria University of Manchester"		
24 March	1880	Institute of Chartered Accountants in England and Wales			
2 March	1881	University of Adelaide			
15 July	1881	Surveyors Institution	"Royal Institution of Chartered Surveyors"		
26 August	1881	South Wales Institute of Engineers			
26 August	1881	University College, Liverpool			
26 August	1881	British North Borneo Company			
18 August	1882	Selwyn College, Cambridge			
18 August	1882	Royal Colonial Institute	"Royal Commonwealth Society"		
20 April	1883	Royal College of Music			
23 August	1883	Charing Cross Hospital			
12 December	1883	Incorporated Society of Law Agents in Scotland	"Scottish Law Agents Society"		
26 June	1884	St. Paul's Hostel, Cambridge			
26 June	1884	Institute of Actuaries	Institute and Faculty of Actuaries		
11 August	1884	University College of South Wales and Monmouthshire	"Cardiff University "		
29 November	1884	Radcliffe Infirmary, Oxford			
30 December	1884	Royal National Hospital for Consumption and Diseases of the Chest on the separate or Cottage principle	"President and Governors of the Royal National Hospital for Disease of the Chest, Ventnor"		
26 March	1885	University College of North Wales	"Bangor University"		C5
19 May	1885	Queen Charlotte's Lying in Hospital	"Queen Charlotte Maternity Hospital"		
19 May	1885	Institute of Chemistry of Great Britain and Ireland	"Royal Institute of Chemistry"		
24 June	1885	Entomological Society of London	"Royal Entomological Society of London"		
12 August	1885	Colonial and Indian Exhibition Commissioners 1886			
8 March	1886	Princess Helena College			
25 June	1886	National African Company			
14 January	1887	Royal Statistical Society			
7 February	1888	Trustees of the Buchanan Bequest			
7 February	1888	Corporation of the Church House			
3 May	1888	Imperial Institute of the United Kingdom, the Colonies, and India and the Isles of the British Seas			
3 May	1888	Grand Priory of the Order of the Hospital of St John of Jerusalem in England	"Grand Priory of the Most Venerable Order of the Hospital of St John of Jerusalem"		
10 August	1888	Imperial British East Africa Company			
5 July	1889	Royal Historical Society			
23 July	1889	University College of Wales, Aberystwyth	"Aberystwyth University"		
19 August	1889	Manchester Whitworth Institute			
19 August	1889	Queen Victoria's Jubilee Institute for Nurses	"Queen's Nursing Institute"		
19 August	1889	Imperial Bank of Persia	"British Bank of the Middle East"		
15 October	1889	British South Africa Company			
8 February	1890	Institute of Journalists			
21 October	1890	National Rifle Association			
21 October	1890	Rossall School			
21 October	1890	St. Peter's College, Radley			
22 November	1890	Newspaper Press Fund			
22 November	1890	Royal London Ophthalmic Hospital			
9 May	1891	Royal Provident Fund for Sea Fishermen	Charter surrendered 1995		
30 July	1891	Chartered Institute of Patent Agents			
28 June	1892	Royal Free Hospital			
5 August	1892	Governors of the Buchanan Retreat			
16 May	1893	Royal British Nurses Association			
23 November	1893	University of Wales			
23 November	1893	Royal College of Organists			
	1894	West London Hospital			
11 May	1895	National Society for the Prevention of Cruelty to Children			
26 November	1897	Queen Victoria Clergy Fund			
3 February	1897	Library Association	"Chartered Institute of Library and Information Professionals"		
19 May	1898	Corporation of the Cranleigh and Bramley Schools			
19 May	1898	Victorian Order of Nurses for Canada			
9 August	1898	Royal Blind Asylum and School, Edinburgh			
7 March	1899	League of Mercy	Royal Charter surrendered June 1947.		
7 March	1899	St. Andrew's Ambulance Association			
14 July	1899	Grand Antiquity Society of Glasgow			
7 October	1899	Iron and Steel Institute			
7 October	1899	British Home and Hospital for Incurables			
3 March	1900	University of Birmingham			
17 September	1900	City and Guilds of London Institute			
17 September	1900	Great Northern Central Hospital	"Royal Northern Hospital"		
26 November	1900	Governors of the Peabody Donation Fund			
11 June	1902	Carnegie Trustees for the Universities of Scotland			
26 July	1902	British Academy for the Promotion of Historical, Philosophical and Philological Studies			
15 September	1902	Weavers Society of Anderston			
20 October	1902	Chartered Institute of Secretaries of Joint Stock Companies and other Public Bodies	"Institute of Chartered Secretaries and Administrators"		
19 November	1902	Royal Economic Society			
16 February	1903	Royal Edinburgh Hospital for Incurables			
16 February	1903	Royal Society for Home Relief to Incurables, Edinburgh			
9 July	1903	Victoria University of Manchester	"University of Manchester"		
9 July	1903	University of Liverpool			
9 July	1903	Chartered Society of Queen Square	Surrendered		
10 August	1903	University College of Nottingham	"University of Nottingham"		
11 February	1904	Royal Numismatic Society			
21 April	1904	University of Leeds			
15 July	1904	West India Committee			
10 August	1904	British Cotton Growing Association			
	1904	Royal Society for the Protection of Birds			
29 May	1905	University of Sheffield			
11 July	1905	Royal National Orthopaedic Hospital			
7 August	1905	Liverpool Royal Infirmary			
11 May	1906	British and Foreign School Society			
30 June	1906	Institute of Directors			
1 December	1906	Hull Royal Infirmary			
11 February	1907	Royal Warrant Holders Association			
1 March	1907	National Museum of Wales			
1 March	1907	National Library of Wales			
1 June	1907	Society of Chemical Industry			
6 July	1907	Imperial College of Science and Technology	"Imperial College of Science, Technology and Medicine"		
2 November	1907	Royal Society of South Africa			
1 August	1908	British Red Cross Society			
21 December	1908	Bedford College for Women	Since 1985 called Royal Holloway and Bedford New College. Now governed by Royal Holloway and Bedford New College Act 1985		
17 May	1909	University of Bristol			
10 August	1909	Royal British Colonial Society of Artists			
22 April	1910	Cancer Hospital (Free)	"Royal Marsden Hospital"		
13 October	1910	Association of Deacons of the Fourteen Incorporated Trades of Glasgow			
28 November	1910	Institution of Naval Architects	Royal Institution of Naval Architects		
23 January	1911	Royal United Kingdom Beneficent Association			
25 May	1911	Royal Society of Painter-Etchers and Engravers	"Royal Society of Painter-Printmakers"		
16 December	1911	Boy Scouts Association	"Scout Association"		
17 January	1912	Chartered Insurance Institute			
14 May	1912	King Edward the Seventh Welsh National Memorial Association			
14 June	1912	British School at Rome			
16 December	1912	King Edward VII Sanatorium	"King Edward VII Hospital"		
11 February	1913	Paton Trust			
11 February	1913	Faculty of Surveyors of Scotland			
24 June	1913	Zoological Society of Scotland	"Royal Zoological Society of Scotland"		
14 October	1913	Royal Asylum of Montrose			
14 October	1913	Montrose Royal Infirmary			
30 March	1914	Liverpool Merchants Guild			
7 January	1915	Institution of Mining Engineers			
7 January	1915	Institution of Mining and Metallurgy			
2 June	1915	University of Tasmania			
23 May	1916	School of Oriental Studies, London Institution	"School of Oriental and African Studies"		
7 September	1916	The Society for the Promotion of Nature Reserves	"The Society for the Promotion of Nature Conservation" "The Royal Society for Nature Conservation" "Royal Society of Wildlife Trusts"		C97
16 November	1916	Imperial Trust for the encouragement of Scientific and Industrial Research			
30 March	1917	Newnham College, Cambridge			
14 April	1917	British Trade Corporation			
10 May	1917	Imperial War Graves Commission	"Commonwealth War Graves Commission"		
19 May	1917	Carnegie United Kingdom Trustees			
27 November	1917	Queen Mary's Hospital for the East End			
14 January	1919	Carnegie Dunfermline and Hero Fund Trustees			
24 February	1919	Incorporation of Cordiners in Glasgow			
15 April	1919	Representative Body of the Church in Wales			
30 May	1919	Imperial Mineral Resources Bureau			
30 May	1919	Royal Hospital and Home for Incurables, Putney	"Royal Hospital for Neuro-disability"		
9 December	1919	Institute of Chartered Shipbrokers			
9 December	1919	University College of Swansea	"Swansea University" 30 August 2007		
20 December	1919	King George's Fund for Sailors			
20 December	1919	Lord Kitchener National Memorial Fund			
11 March	1920	Leicester Royal Infirmary			
25 March	1920	Medical Research Council			
25 March	1920	Forestry Commissioners			
17 May	1920	Chamber of Shipping of the United Kingdom			
17 May	1920	Chartered Society of Massage and Medical Gymnastics	"Chartered Society of Physiotherapy"		
28 June	1920	Royal Academy of Dramatic Art			
13 October	1920	St. Mary's Hospital, Paddington			
22 April	1921	United Services Fund			
10 June	1921	Officers Association			
14 July	1921	Medical College of St. Bartholomew's Hospital in the City of London			
10 August	1921	Institution of Electrical Engineers			
11 October	1921	Empire Forestry Association	"Commonwealth Forestry Association"		
11 October	1921	Empire Cotton Growing Corporation	"Cotton Research Corporation"		
7 November	1921	Institute of British Foundrymen	"Institute of Cast Metals Engineers"		
13 December	1921	Royal Liverpool Seamen's Orphan Institution			
6 February	1922	Royal Scottish Society for Prevention of Cruelty to Children			
3 March	1922	Royal Victoria College, Montreal			
3 March	1922	Over-Seas League	"Royal Over-Seas League"		
1 April	1922	Royal Naval Benevolent Trust (Grand Fleet and Kindred Funds)			
5 May	1922	Incorporation of Architects in Scotland	"Royal Incorporation of Architects in Scotland"		
20 June	1922	St. John's Foundation School			
10 August	1922	College of Estate Management	Now the University of the Built Environment		
6 December	1922	Toc H (Incorporated)	"Toc H"		
6 December	1922	Girl Guides Association	"The Guide Association"		
29 January	1923	Institution of Royal Engineers			
12 March	1923	British Institute of Florence			
27 March	1923	Royal Manchester College of Music			
4 May	1923	Confederation of British Industry			
4 May	1923	Wolverhampton and Staffordshire Hospital			
26 June	1923	Cardiff Royal Infirmary			
26 June	1923	Royal Westminster Ophthalmic Hospital			
11 October	1923	Dover College			
21 March	1924	London School of Hygiene and Tropical Medicine			
25 June	1924	Royal Life Saving Society			
25 July	1924	Girton College, Cambridge			
6 February	1925	The Textile Institute			
17 March	1925	British Legion	"Royal British Legion"		
12 October	1925	League of Nations Union			
12 October	1925	London Playing Fields Society			
12 October	1925	Shakespeare Memorial Theatre, Stratford-upon-Avon	"Royal Shakespeare Theatre", then "Royal Shakespeare Company'"		
16 December	1925	The Soldiers', Sailors' and Airmen's Families Association	The Soldiers, Sailors, Airmen and Families Association - Forces Help		C141
1 February	1926	University of Reading			
25 February	1926	Lady Margaret Hall, Oxford	"Lady Margaret College, Oxford"		
25 February	1926	St Hilda's College, Oxford			
25 February	1926	Birkbeck College			
25 February	1926	Royal Medico-Psychological Association	"Royal College of Psychiatrists"		
30 April	1926	Somerville College, Oxford			
1 June	1926	Royal Masonic Institution for Boys			
1 June	1926	The Mothers Union			
28 June	1926	Royal Institute of International Affairs			
28 June	1926	St Hugh's College, Oxford			
5 November	1926	Institute of Transport	"Chartered Institute of Logistics and Transport"		
5 November	1926	Imperial College of Tropical Agriculture			
20 November	1926	British Broadcasting Corporation			
14 December	1926	National Police Fund			
6 February	1928	National Association of Colliery Managers			
22 March	1928	British Association for the Advancement of Science			
22 March	1928	Institute of Chartered Accountants in Australia			
13 July	1928	College of Nursing	"Royal College of Nursing of the United Kingdom"		
1 -August	1928	Royal Victoria Hospital, Dundee			
20 November	1928	London Homeopathic Hospital			
20 November	1928	National Art Collection Fund			
21 December	1928	Malvern College			
29 January	1929	Elizabeth Garrett Anderson Hospital			
1 March	1929	Howard Leopold Davis Scholarships Trust			
21 March	1929	British Engineering Standards Association	"British Standards Institution"		
7 May	1929	Land Agent's Society			
10 May	1929	Indian Church Trustees			
10 May	1929	Institution of Gas Engineers			
5 July	1929	National Radium Trust			
5 July	1929	Institute of Hygiene	Royal Institute of Public Health merged with Royal Society for the Promotion of Health and petitioned for a new charter of incorporation under the name of The Royal Society for Public Health (11 June 2008)		
17 December	1929	King George Hospital at Ilford			
20 January	1930	Royal Society for the Relief of Indigent Gentlewomen of Scotland			
28 March	1930	Institution of Mechanical Engineers			
28 July	1930	King Edward VII's Hospital for Officers, Sister Agnes Founder			
28 July	1930	Honourable Company of Master Mariners			
28 July	1930	Oundle School			
28 July	1930	East Ham Memorial Hospital			
18 December	1930	Welsh National School of Medicine	"University of Wales College of Medicine"		
20-Mar	1931	Imperial Service College			
27 March	1931	National Central Library			
29 June	1931	Agricultural Research Council	"Agricultural & Food Research Council"		
29 June	1931	British Postgraduate Medical School	"Royal Postgraduate Medical School"		
1 October	1931	Glasgow Fishmongers Company			
7 October	1931	Australian Chemical Institute	"Royal Australian Chemical Institute"		
7 October	1931	Royal Seamen's Pension Fund			
11 February	1932	Universities China Committee in London			
15 December	1932	National Playing Fields Association			
16 March	1933	Institute of Marine Engineers			
25 May	1933	London Library			
26 June	1933	Westfield College, London			
26 June	1933	Company of Newspaper Makers			
22 March	1934	Institution of Structural Engineers			
9 November	1934	Queen Mary College			
20 December	1934	City of London Maternity Hospital			
21 February	1935	Cheltenham Ladies College			
6 June	1935	Royal Agricultural Benevolent Institution			
13 August	1935	Institution of Engineers (India)			
20 December	1935	Royal Academy of Dancing	"Royal Academy of Dance"		
27 October	1936	Children's Aid Society			
13 April	1937	Worshipful Company of Basketmakers			
29 July	1937	General Infirmary at Leeds			
24 February	1938	Engineers Australia			
15 March	1938	Institution of Automobile Engineers			
4 November	1938	London (Royal Free Hospital) School of Medicine for Women	"Royal Free Hospital School of Medicine"		
25 November	1938	Roedean School			
25 May	1939	National Association of Boy's Clubs	"NABC - Clubs for Young People"		
25 July	1939	Imperial Cancer Research Fund			
19 September	1940	British Council			
30 May	1941	Australian Red Cross Society			
26 June	1946	King's School, Canterbury			
26 June	1946	Worshipful Company of Carmen			
10 July	1946	The Arts Council of Great Britain	In 1994 split in three: The Arts Council of England Scottish Arts Council Arts Council of Wales		C159
10 July	1946	Institute of Fuel	(1) Institute of Energy (6 February 1979) (2) Institute of Energy merged with Institute of Petroleum now called "Energy Institute" (8 May 2003)		
29 January	1947	Royal College of Obstetricians and Gynaecologists			
10 March	1947	British Postgraduate Medical Federation			
28 October	1947	Scottish National War Memorial Trustees			
28 October	1947	Officers Families Fund			
13 November	1947	Auctioneers' and Estate Agents' Institute			
9 July	1948	University of Nottingham			
13 September	1948	Wye College			
13 September	1948	Institution of Municipal Engineers			
25 October	1948	British and Foreign Bible Society			
22 December	1948	Royal Aeronautical Society			
22 December	1948	University College of the West Indies	"University of the West Indies"		
4 March	1949	Nature Conservancy			
4 March	1949	National Institute for the Blind	(1) "Royal National Institute for the Blind" (2)"Royal National Institute of Blind People"		
30 June	1949	University College of North Staffordshire	"University of Keele"		
25 November	1949	Railway Benevolent Institution			
31 March	1950	Royal Alfred Merchant Seamen's Society	"Royal Alfred Seafarers' Society"		
25 April	1950	Women's Royal Naval Service Benevolent Trust			
25 April	1950	Standards Association of Australia			
9 October	1950	National Oceanographic Council			
9 October	1950	University College of Leicester	"University of Leicester"		
8 December	1950	Worshipful Company of Musicians			
21 December	1950	Campbell College, Belfast			
1 November	1951	Ceylon Red Cross Society	"Sri Lanka Red Cross Society"		
14 November	1951	Honourable Society of Cymmrodorion			
24 March	1952	University of Southampton			
9 April	1952	School of Pharmacy, University of London			
29 April	1952	St Anne's College, Oxford			
29 July	1952	Royal Masonic Institution for Girls			
25 November	1952	Principal and Governors of Queen Elizabeth College			
04-Dec	1952	Royal Air Forces Association			
1 April	1953	St Antony's College, Oxford			
30 April	1953	Faculty of Radiologists	"Royal College of Radiologists"		
20 Jan	1954	Australian Academy of Science			
13 May	1954	University of Hull			
15 July	1954	Royal Naval Association			
21 December	1954	Queen Elizabeth House, Oxford			
10 February	1955	University College of Rhodesia and Nyasaland			
7 April	1955	Cuddesdon Theological College	"Ripon College Cuddesdon"		
7 April	1955	Seafarers Education Service			
29 July	1955	Manchester College of Science and Technology	"University of Manchester Institute of Science and Technology" and has now changed to "University of Manchester"		
29 July	1955	Company of Farmers of the City of London			
29 July	1955	Australasian Institute of Mining and Metallurgy			
28 October	1955	University of Exeter			
9 October	1956	Royal Ballet			
15 February	1957	St Edmund Hall, Oxford			
22 February	1957	Institution of Chemical Engineers			
15 March	1957	University of Leicester			
17 May	1957	City of London Solicitor's Company			
23 August	1957	English-Speaking Union of the Commonwealth			
19 February	1958	British Institute of Radiology			
14 Mar	1958	Nuffield College, Oxford			
07-May	1958	National Institute for Research in Nuclear Science			
21 November	1958	Institute of Municipal Treasurers and Accountants	"Chartered Institute of Public Finance and Accountancy"		
19 December	1958	Royal Humane Society			
15 June	1959	Town Planning Institute	"Royal Town Planning Institute"		
21 December	1959	Fourah Bay College - The University College of Sierra Leone			
8 April	1960	National Army Museum			
3 August	1960	Churchill College, Cambridge			
26 October	1960	Westcott House, Cambridge			
2 August	1961	University of Sussex			
2 August	1961	British Institution of Radio Engineers	"Institute of Electronic and Radio Engineers"		
24 October	1961	Royal Archaeological Institute			
24 October	1961	St Peter's College, Oxford			
6 December	1961	University of Keele			
21 December	1961	Chartered Institute of Loss Adjusters			
26 February	1962	University of the West Indies			
2 October	1962	Magistrates Association			
28 November	1962	Library Association of Australia			
26 March	1963	Society of Dyers and Colourists			
2 May	1963	Royal Society of St. George			
30 May	1963	Association of Commonwealth Universities			
29 July	1963	University of York			
29 July	1963	St Catherine's College, Oxford			
29 July	1963	Animal Health Trust			
27 November	1963	University of East Anglia			
27 November	1963	University of Basutoland, the Bechuanaland Protectorate and Swaziland	"University of Botswana, Lesotho and Swaziland"		
26 March	1964	Institution of Production Engineers	"Institution of Manufacturing Engineers"		
23 June	1964	University of Strathclyde			
23 June	1964	Liverpool Medical Institution			
27 July	1964	University of Lancaster			
27 July	1964	Council for National Academic Awards			
20 November	1964	University of Kent at Canterbury	"The University of Kent"	4 October 2010	C388
20 November	1964	University of Essex			
29 January	1965	University of Warwick			
26 February	1965	Science Research Council	"Science and Engineering Research Council"		
26 February	1965	British Psychological Society			
4 May	1965	Natural Environment Research Council			
3 August	1965	Council of Engineering Institutions			
3 August	1965	London Mathematical Society			
29 October	1965	The Social Science Research Council	"The Economic and Social Research Council"		C73
31 January	1966	Heriot-Watt University			
24 February	1966	Loughborough University of Technology			
10 March	1966	University of Aston in Birmingham			
6 April	1966	City University			
9 June	1966	Brunel University			
28 July	1966	University of Surrey			
28 July	1966	Fitzwilliam College, Cambridge			
20 September	1966	University of Bradford			
20 September	1966	Bath University of Technology	"University of Bath"		
10 February	1967	University of Salford			
28 June	1967	University of Dundee			
28 July	1967	Royal College of Art			
23 August	1967	Australian Boy Scouts Association			
10 October	1967	Institution of Radio and Electronic Engineers, Australia			
13 November	1967	University of Stirling			
13 November	1967	University of Wales Institute of Science and Technology			
22 March	1968	Royal African Society			
23 April	1969	The Open University			
25 June	1969	Australian Academy of the Humanities for the Advancement of Scholarship in Language, Literature, History, Philosophy and the Fine Arts			
31 July	1969	Australian Institute of Building			
28 November	1969	Society for Promoting Christian Knowledge			
28 November	1969	Cranfield Institute of Technology	"Cranfield University"		
19 December	1969	Royal College of Pathologists			
4 February	1970	Jockey Club (incorporating the National Hunt Committee)			
4 February	1970	University of the South Pacific			
28 July	1970	New University of Ulster			
30 September	1970	Institute of Physics			
11 March	1971	Heythrop College			
22 December	1971	Chelsea College, University of London			
22 December	1971	The Sports Council	In 1996 split to become "The United Kingdom Sports Council" and "The English Sports Council"		C319
22 December	1971	Scottish Sports Council			
22 December	1971	Sports Council for Wales			
28 June	1972	New Hall, Cambridge			
23 October	1972	Royal College of General Practitioners			
24 October	1973	Anglo-German Foundation for the study of Industrial Society			
16 October	1974	Association of Certified Accountants	"Association of Chartered Certified Accountants"		
12 February	1975	Institute of Cost and Management Accountants	"Chartered Institute of Management Accountants"		
12 February	1975	Institution of Metallurgists	"Institute of Materials" then to "The Institute of Materials, Minerals and Mining"		
18 March	1975	Institute of Measurement and Control			
12 November	1975	College of Law			
17 March	1976	Institution of Heating and Ventilating Engineers under title of "Chartered Institution of Building Services"			
19 May	1976	Design Council			
19 May	1976	Society of Industrial Artists and Designers	"The Chartered Society of Designers"		
9 June	1976	Darwin College, Cambridge			
15 September	1976	Institute of Bankers in Scotland	"Chartered Institute of Bankers in Scotland"		
27 October	1976	Wolfson College, Cambridge			
15 November	1977	University College, London			
25 April	1978	Carnegie Trustees for the Universities of Scotland (new)			
6 February	1979	Institute of Arbitrators			
14 March	1979	Building Societies Institute			
14 March	1979	Institute of Biology	Society of Biology		
13 February	1980	King's College, London			
19 March	1980	Royal Society of Chemistry (amalgamation between Royal Institute of Chemistry and Chemical Society)			
28 July	1980	Institute of Building	"Chartered Institute of Building"		
18 February	1981	Wolfson College, Oxford			
28 October	1981	Engineering Council			
10 February	1982	Institute of Foresters			
11 February	1983	University of Buckingham			
22 June	1983	British Film Institute			
18 May	1983	Crafts Council			
20 April	1984	Fellowship of Engineering	"Royal Academy of Engineering"		
11 April	1984	Industrial Society	"The Work Foundation"		
25 June	1984	Institute of Housing	"Chartered Institute of Housing"		
25 June	1984	Institution of Environmental Health Officers	"Chartered Institute of Environmental Health"		
31 July	1984	University of Ulster			
31 July	1984	British Computer Society			
12 September	1984	Clare Hall, Cambridge			
30 October	1984	Robinson College, Cambridge			
5 June	1986	Linacre College, Oxford			
8 July	1986	London Graduate School of Business Studies			
25 November	1986	Museums and Galleries Commission			
10 February	1987	Institute of Bankers	(1) "Chartered Institute of Bankers" (2) "ifs School of Finance"		
10 June	1987	University of London Institute of Education			
23-Mar	1988	College of Ophthalmologists			
27 April	1988	Motability			
7 February	1989	Institute of Marketing	"The Chartered Institute of Marketing"		
2 August	1989	Queen Mary and Westfield College			
19 December	1989	Royal Commonwealth Society for the Blind			
1 November	1989	Goldsmiths College, University of London			
7 June	1990	The Institute of Mathematics and it Applications			
26 June	1990	Royal Star and Garter Homes for Disabled Sailors, Soldiers and Airmen			
21 May	1991	The Henley Management College			C617
11 February	1992	Royal College of Anaesthetists			C417
15 July	1992	The Chartered Institute of Purchasing & Supply			C393
16 December	1993	The Biotechnology and Biological Sciences Research Council		29 March 1994	C714
16 December	1993	The Engineering and Physical Sciences Research Council		29 April 1994	C715
16 December	1993	Particle Physics and Astronomy Research Council	Surrendered 14 November 2007		C716
8 February	1994	The Arts Council of England			C938
8 February	1994	The Scottish Arts Council	Charter revoked by the Public Services Reform (Scotland) Act 2010 - 1 July 2010		C723
8 February	1994	The Arts Council of Wales		30 March 1994	C722
15 March	1994	The Institute of Taxation	"The Chartered Institute of Taxation"		C377
14 December	1994	The Chartered Institution of Water and Environmental Management			C663
14 December	1994	Council for the Central Laboratory of the Research Council	Surrendered		C739
11 April	1995	The Principal and Fellows of Mansfield College in the University of Oxford – known as Mansfield College, Oxford			C392
11 April	1995	The President, Fellows and Students of Templeton College in the University of Oxford – known as Green Templeton College, Oxford	"The Principal, Fellows and Students of Green Templeton College in the University of Oxford"		C674
28 June	1995	The College of Optometrists			C20
23 November	1995	The Principal and Fellows of The Manchester Academy and Harris College in the University of Oxford – known as Manchester College, Oxford			C733
13 March	1996	Cardiff County Council			
23 July	1996	English Sports Council			C808
23 July	1996	The United Kingdom Sports Council			C937
23 July	1996	College of Paediatrics and Child Health	"Royal College of Paediatrics and Child Health"		C690
23 July	1996	Borough of North East Lincolnshire			
26 June	1997	The Landscape Institute		22 August 1997	C661
22 July	1997	The President and Fellows of Lucy Cavendish College in the University of Cambridge – known as Lucy Cavendish College			575
22 July	1997	Brighton and Hove Council			
11 February	1998	Medway Town Council			
11 February	1998	Historic Royal Palaces		6 March 1998	C777
22 April	1998	The Master, Fellows and Scholars of St. Edmund's College in the University of Cambridge – known as St Edmund's College, Cambridge		6 July 1998	C753
15 October	1998	North Lincolnshire District Council			
12 October	1999	The Prince's Trust			C786
24 November	1999	The Royal Air Force Benevolent Fund			C364
8 February	2000	Chartered Institute of Personnel and Development			C210
12 July	2000	The Royal Environmental Health Institute of Scotland			C696
11 April	2001	The Institution of Incorporated Engineers			C789
11 December	2001	Chartered Institution of Wastes Management			C590
12 February	2002	Chartered Management Institute			C812
12 February	2002	Telford and the Wrekin Borough Council			
26 June	2002	The Institution of Occupational Safety and Health			C647
12 June	2003	The Science Council			C811
11 February	2004	The Worshipful Company of Engineers			C813
11 February	2004	The Worshipful Company of Paviors			C836
8 May	2004	Society for the Environment			C832
27 July	2004	The Royal Photographic Society of Great Britain			C826
13 October	2004	The Association for Science Education			C816
16 December	2004	The Arts and Humanities Research Council			C892
9 February	2005	The Chartered Institute of Public Relations			C383
7 May	2005	The Worshipful Company of Water Conservators			C850
7 May	2005	Chartered Institute of Architectural Technologists			C746
19 July	2005	The Chartered Institute of Linguists		19 September 2006	C616
14 December	2005	The Duke of Edinburgh's Award		31 March 2006	C856
19 July	2006	The Chartered Quality Institute		23 November 2006	C475
19 July	2006	Elizabeth Phillips Hughes Hall, Cambridge – known as Hughes Hall, Cambridge		23 November 2006	C862
5 September	2006	English Association		1 December 2006	C846
10 October	2006	Historical Association		15 December 2006	C863
14 November	2006	The Royal Institute of Navigation		22 February 2007	C865
14 November	2006	Wokingham Borough		1 March 2007	
7 February	2007	The Technology Strategy Board		27 March 2007	C872
7 February	2007	The Science and Technology Facilities Council		27 March 2007	C901
25 July	2007	The Chartered Institute of Educational Assessors		2 April 2008	C861
25 July	2007	The Worshipful Company of Management Consultants		4 October 2007	C877
10 October	2007	The Worshipful Company of International Bankers			C866
10 October	2007	The Society for Radiological Protection		10 December 2007	C833
12 December	2007	The College of Emergency Medicine		20 February 2008	C822
12 February	2008	The Chartered Institute of Plumbing and Heating Engineering		30 June 2008	C864
12 February	2008	The Worshipful Company of Chartered Secretaries and Administrators		24 June 2008	C871
11 June	2008	The Royal Society for Public Health		23 October 2008	C907
9 July	2008	The King's Fund		4 November 2008	C881
10 December	2008	Cheshire West and Chester Borough		1 April 2009	
10 December	2008	West Lancashire Borough		20 May 2009	
10 December	2008	Cheshire East Borough		1 April 2009	
18 March	2009	Chartered Institution of Civil Engineering Surveyors		2 September 2009	C582
13-May	2009	The Worshipful Company of Actuaries		4 September 2009	C904
8 July	2009	The Worshipful Company of Tax Advisers		9 October 2009	C880
8 July	2009	Chartered Institute for Securities & Investment			C913
15 October	2009	Worshipful Company of Security Professionals		15 February 2010	C917
15 October	2009	The Chartered Institution of Highways and Transportation		7 December 2009	C124
17 November	2009	The Principal, Fellows and Scholars of Homerton College in the University of Cambridge		11 March 2010	C915
10 February	2010	The Worshipful Company of Constructors		27 April 2010	C919
10 February	2010	The Worshipful Company of Launderers		17 June 2010	C923
10 February	2010	Institute of Internal Auditors - UK and Ireland		24 June 2010	C914
10 February	2010	Worshipful Company of Information Technologists		16 June 2010	C903
17 March	2010	The Firefighters Memorial Trust		4 October 2010	C920
12 April	2010	The Worshipful Company of Marketors		22 September 2010	C918
21 July	2010	Basildon Council			990(318)
21 July	2010	The Worshipful Company of Environmental Cleaners			C927
10 November	2010	Chartered Institute of Payroll Professionals		11 March 2011	C926
16 March	2011	Worshipful Company of Arbitrators		24 April 2012	C928
7 April	2011	Chartered Institute for the Management of Sport and Physical Activity		5 October 2011	C884
8 June	2011	Worshipful Company of Chartered Accountants in England and Wales		6 September 2012	C496
13 July	2011	Oxford Centre for Islamic Studies		20 April 2012	C916
12 October	2011	Chartered Institute of Legal Executives		30 January 2012	C122
12 October	2011	Institution of Engineering Designers		30 January 2012	C707
30 May	2012	Worshipful Company of Builders Merchants		5th September 2012	C933
30 May	2012	Worshipful Company of Lightmongers		4 September 2012	C868
10 July	2012	The Association of Corporate Treasurers	Came into legal effect 1 January 2013	1 November 2012	C768
17 October	2012	The British Occupational Hygiene Society		20 December 2012	C749
7 November	2012	The College of Chiropractors	"The Royal College of Chiropractors"	14 March 2013	C809
7 November	2012	Chartered Institute of Ecology and Environmental Management	Came into legal effect 1 April 2013	28 March 2013	C752
12 December	2012	Marylebone Cricket Club	Came into legal effect 1 July 2013	10 June 2013	C947
15 May	2013	The Marine Biological Association of the United Kingdom		26 July 2013	C951
15 May	2013	Worshipful Company of Furniture Makers		19 August 2013	C956
15 May	2013	The Worshipful Livery Company of Wales		6 September 2013	C731
15 May	2013	Worshipful Company of Hackney Carriage Drivers		10 October 2013	C952
10 July	2013	Chartered Association of Building Engineers		1 November 2013	C912
13 June	2013	The Worshipful Company of Chartered Surveyors		2 December 2013	C943
13 July	2013	Worshipful Company of World Traders			
30 October	2013	Recognition Panel		12 December 2013	C963
11 December	2013	Worshipful Company of Firefighters			
26 May	2021	Worshipful Company of Fletchers			

== Kingdom of England ==
=== 13th and 14th century ===
see table above.

=== 15th century ===
- 4 December 1416 Cutlers' Company
- 16 February 1428 Grocers' Company
- 22 February 1437 Brewers' Company
- 23 August 1437 Vintners' Company
- 26 April 1439 Cordwainers' Company
- 1441 King's College, Cambridge
- 1444 Leathersellers' Company
- 8 May 1453 Armourers' and Brasiers' Company
- 13 October 1457 Magdalen College, Oxford
- 8 March 1462 Tallow Chandlers' Company
- 1462 Barbers' Company
- 20 March 1463 Ironmongers' Company
- 16 February 1471 Dyers' Company
- 20 January 1473 Pewterers' Company
- 1474 Corporation of Blacksmith's of Dublin
- 16 August 1475 St. Catharine's College, Cambridge
- 7 July 1477 Carpenters' Company
- 16 February 1483 Wax Chandlers' Company
- 1496 Jesus College, Cambridge

=== 16th century ===
==== 1500-1549 ====
- 10 March 1501 Plaisterers' Company
- 29 April 1501 Coopers' Company
- 23 February 1504 Poulters' Company
- 1 July 1505 Royal College of Surgeons of Edinburgh
- 2 July 1509 Bakers' Company
- 9 April 1511 St John's College, Cambridge
- 15 January 1512 Brasenose College, Oxford
- 1513 Nottingham High School
- 1517 Corpus Christi College, Oxford
- 23 September 1518 Royal College of Physicians of London
- 18 January 1528 Clothworkers' Company
- 1532 Bristol Grammar School
- 25 August 1537 Honourable Artillery Company
- 1539 Colchester Royal Grammar School (granted a second charter by Elizabeth I, see below)
- 1541 King's Ely (granted a second charter by Elizabeth I and a third charter by Charles II, see below)
- 1542 Magdalene College, Cambridge
- 23 July 1545 King Henry VIII School, Coventry
- 1545 Warwick School
- 1547 Trinity College, Cambridge
- 1547 Norwich School
- 13 January 1547 Bethlem Hospital
- 13 January 1547 Saint Bartholomew's Hospital
- 1549 Pembroke College, Cambridge

==== 1550-1599 ====
- 13 May 1550 Sherborne School
- 1550 French Protestant Church of London
- 14 May 1552 Sedbergh School
- 17 June 1552 King Edward VI Grammar School, Stourbridge
- 12 July 1552 King Edward's School, Bath
- 18 December 1552 Society of Merchant Venturers of Bristol
- 1552 Bedford School
- 1552 King Edward's School, Birmingham
- 1552 The King's School, Macclesfield
- 26 May 1553 Giggleswick School
- 26 June 1553 Bridewell Hospital
- 26 June 1553 Christ's Hospital
- 1553 King Edward VI Grammar School, Southampton
- 1553 Tonbridge School
- 6 January 1555 Boston Grammar School, Lincolnshire
- 1554 Clitheroe Royal Grammar School
- 1554 Queen Mary's Grammar School, Walsall
- 15 July 1555 College of Arms
- 1555 St. John's College, Oxford
- 7 July 1556 Charity of the Priest and Poor of Ginge Petre in the County of Essex
- 4 May 1557 Stationers' Company
- 5 July 1558 Brentwood School
- 21 May 1560 Dean and Chapter of the Collegiate Church of St Peter, Westminster
- 28 February 1561 Royal Grammar School Worcester
- 1561 Kingston Grammar School, Kingston upon Thames
- 25 October 1561 Broderers' Company
- 1562 St. Olave's and St. Saviour's Grammar School
- 1562 King's Ely
- 15 June 1563 Queen Elizabeth Grammar School, Darlington
- 1565 Exeter College, Oxford
- 1565 Highgate School
- 1567 Queen Elizabeth's Grammar School, Blackburn
- 3 August 1568 Tylers' and Bricklayers' Company
- 12 October 1568 Girdlers' Company
- 14 April 1570 Joiners' Company
- 1571 Blacksmiths' Company
- 1571 Harrow School
- 27 June 1571 Jesus College, Oxford
- 9 February 1573 University College, Oxford
- 1574 Cranbrook School, Kent
- 1576 Sutton Valence School
- 19 June 1578 Haberdashers' Company
- 19 July 1581 Painter-Stainers' Company
- 1584 Colchester Royal Grammar School
- 1584 Uppingham School
- 1585 Queen's College, Oxford
- 1591 Queen Elizabeth Grammar School, Wakefield
- 1592 Queen Elizabeth's Hospital, Bristol
- 1594 Sidney Sussex College, Cambridge
- 3 May 1597 Hospital of St. John the Evangelist and St. Anne in Oakham

=== 17th century ===
==== 1600s ====
- 22 March 1600 Royal Grammar School, Newcastle
- 1603 Oriel College, Oxford
- 1603 Hostmen Company of Freemen of Newcastle upon Tyne
- 30 August 1603 Fishmongers' Company
- 17 December 1603 Bishop Auckland Grammar School
- 2 August 1604 Feltmakers' Company
- 16 September 1605 Butchers' Company
- 18 September 1605 Gardeners' Company
- 9 January 1606 Fruiterers' Company
- 19 January 1606 Drapers Company
- 30 April 1606 Curriers' Company
- 30 April 1607 Prince Henry's Grammar School, Otley
- 15 May 1607 Salters' Company
- 24 November 1609 King James School, Almondbury

==== 1610s ====
- 12 April 1611 Plumbers' Company
- 22 June 1611 Sutton's Hospital in Charterhouse
- 20 December 1611 Wadham College, Oxford
- 13 September 1612 Don Baudains (Jersey)
- 1613 Honourable Irish Society
- 18 September 1614 Founders' Company
- 1615 Wilson's Grammar School
- 28 January 1617 Scriveners' Company
- 6 December 1617 Society of Apothecaries of London
- 21 June 1619 Dulwich College

==== 1620s ====
- 1621 Bowyers' Company
- 1624 Pembroke College, Oxford
- 14 June 1626 Upholders' Company
- 22 October 1628 Playing Card Makers' Company
- 16 May 1629 Spectacle Makers' Company

==== 1630s ====
- 3 July 1630 Sion College
- 8 July 1631 Sackville College, East Grinstead
- 22 August 1631 Clockmakers' Company
- 14 March 1637 Gunmakers' Company
- 12 January 1638 Horners' Company
- 9 August 1638 Distillers' Company
- 6 November 1638 Glaziers' Company
- 10 September 1639 The Company of Glovers of the City of London
- 27 February 1639 Worshipful Company of Parish Clerks

==== 1660s ====
- 28 November 1661 Glass Sellers' Company
- 7 February 1662 New England Company
- 15 July 1662 Royal Society
- 1662 Bradford Grammar School
- 16 February 1663 Cooks' Company
- 21 December 1663 Innholders' Company
- 1663 Framework Knitters' Company
- 9 February 1664 Needlemakers' Company
- 30 June 1664 Royal Scottish Corporation
- 18 May 1666 Broadweavers and Clothiers Company of Coventry
- 1666 King's Ely

==== 1670s ====
- 3 February 1670 Wheelwrights' Company
- 2 May 1670 Hudson's Bay Company
- 2 August 1670 Pattenmakers' Company
- 29 December 1670 Tin Plate Workers' Company
- 18 November 1672 Trinity House in Kingston-upon-Hull
- 17 January 1674 Farriers' Company
- 31 May 1677 Coachmakers' Company
- 17 December 1677 Masons' Company
- 1 July 1678 Corporation of the Sons of the Clergy

==== 1680s ====
- 19 October 1681 Company of Merchants of the City of Edinburgh
- 8 July 1685 Corporation of the Trinity House of Deptford Strond

==== 1690s ====
- 8 February 1693 The College of William & Mary
- 16 June 1693 Gold and Silver Wyre Drawers' Company
- 27 July 1694 Bank of England
- 25 October 1694 The Royal Hospital, Greenwich

=== 18th century ===
==== 1700s ====
- 16 June 1701 Society for the Propagation of the Gospel in Foreign Parts
- 19 April 1706 Grey Coat Hospital in Tothill Fields of the Foundation of Queen Anne

== Kingdom of Scotland ==
=== 16th century ===
- 1582 University of Edinburgh

== Kingdom of Great Britain ==
=== 18th century ===
==== 1700s ====
- 15 July 1704 Bermondsey tanners Surrey/ Greater London

==== 1710s ====
- 23 May 1711 Blanket Weavers in Witney, Oxfordshire
- 3 December 1711 Loriners' Company
- 29 July 1714 Worcester College, Oxford
- 24 July 1718 French Protestant Hospital
- 27 July 1719 Music Society for Carrying on Operas and other entertainments

==== 1720s ====
- 22 June 1720 London Assurance Corporation
- 22 June 1720 Royal Exchange Assurance
- 1727 The Royal Bank of Scotland
- 31 July 1729 Queen Elizabeth Grammar School, Halifax

==== 1730s ====
- 17 October 1739 Foundling Hospital

==== 1740s ====
- 28 April 1741 Charity for the Relief of the Widows and Children of the Clergy of Norwich and Norfolk
- 13 April 1742 Charity for the Relief of the Widows and Children of the Clergy of Suffolk
- 5 July 11 October British Linen Bank
- 29 April 1747 Governors of the Charity for the relief of the poor Widows and Orphans of Beneficed Clergymen or having Curacys in the County of Essex the Deanery of Braughing and Archdeaconry of St. Albans, County of Hertford and Diocese of London

==== 1750s ====
- 2 November 1751 Society of Antiquaries of London
- 9 December 1758 London Hospital

==== 1760s ====
- 8 June 1765 Bethel Hospital, Norwich

==== 1770s ====
- 19 June 1773 Carron Company
- 1773 Royal Medical Society
- 27 January 1774 Society of Advocates in Aberdeen

==== 1780s ====
- 24 March 1781 Governors of the possessions etc. of the Free Chapel of Hindon within the parish of East Knoyle, Wiltshire
- 29 March 1783 Royal Society of Edinburgh
- 6 May 1783 Society of Antiquaries of Scotland
- 9 June 1783 Glasgow Chamber of Commerce and Manufactures
- 10 July 1786 Edinburgh Chamber of Commerce and Manufactures
- 17 May 1787 Royal Highland and Agricultural Society of Scotland

==== 1790s ====
- 26 August 1790 Royal Society of Musicians of Great Britain
- 21 December 1791 Glasgow Royal Infirmary
- 9 January 1792 Society for the Benefit of Sons and Daughters of the Clergy of the Church of Scotland
- 30 October 1794 Christian Faith Society
- 6 June 1796 Royal Faculty of Procurators in Glasgow
- 24 January 1797 Society of Solicitors in the Supreme Courts of Scotland
- 28 June 1798 Ayr Academy

=== 19th century ===
==== 1800s ====
- 13 January 1800 Royal Institution of Great Britain
- 22 March 1800 Royal College of Surgeons of England
- 22 September 1800 Downing College, Cambridge

== United Kingdom ==
=== 19th century ===
==== 1800s ====
- 19 April 1801 James Gillespie's Hospital and Free School
- 26 March 1802 Linnean Society of London
- 12 May 1802 University of King's College, Halifax, Nova Scotia
- 7 April 1807 Dumfries and Galloway Royal Infirmary
- 17 April 1809 Royal Horticultural Society

==== 1810s ====
- 23 May 1817 National Society for Promoting the Education of the Poor in the Principles of the Established Church throughout England and Wales
- 13 January 1818 Royal Edinburgh Public Dispensary
- 19 May 1818 Royal Literary Fund
- 8 May 1819 Dundee Royal Infirmary

==== 1820s ====
- 1820 Faculty of Procurators and Solicitors in Dundee
- 31 March 1821 McGill University, Montreal
- 6 February 1824 Edinburgh Academy
- 11 August 1824 Royal Asiatic Society
- 14 October 1824 Royal Caledonian Horticultural Society
- 1 November 1824 Australian Agricultural Company
- 9 December 1824 Glasgow Royal Mental Hospital
- 23 April 1825 Geological Society of London
- 15 September 1825 Royal Society of Literature of the United Kingdom
- 10 November 1825 Van Diemen's Land Company
- 28 June 1826 University Life Assurance Society
- 19 August 1826 Canada Company
- 15 March 1827 University of Toronto
- 2 August 1827 Society for the management and distribution of the Artists Fund
- 6 February 1828 St David's College, Lampeter
- 3 June 1828 Institution of Civil Engineers
- 27 March 1829 Zoological Society of London
- 14 August 1829 King's College London

==== 1830s ====
- 18 January 1830 General Lying-in Hospital
- 23 June 1830 Royal Academy of Music
- 7 March 1831 Royal Astronomical Society
- 6 August 1832 Cambridge Philosophical Society
- 20 March 1834 British American Land Company
- 30 September 1834 Royal Medical and Chirurgical Society of London
- 3 May 1836 Society of Licensed Victuallers
- 28 November 1836 University of London
- 11 January 1837 Royal Institute of British Architects
- 1 June 1837 University of Durham
- 7 June 1837 Company of Stationers of Glasgow
- 26 April 1838 Royal Naval Benevolent Society
- 13 August 1838 Royal Scottish Academy of Painting, Sculpture & Architecture
- 26 August 1839 Mauritius Commercial Bank

==== 1840s ====
- 26 March 1840 Royal Agricultural Society of England
- 29 January 1840 Pacific Steam Navigation Company
- 1 August 1840 Society of Solicitors of Banffshire
- 10 November 1840 P&O
- 16 March 1841 Bank of Australasia
- 16 October 1841 Queen's University at Kingston, Ontario
- 16 March 1842 McLachlan's Free School
- 30 June 1842 Artists General Benevolent Institution
- 15 December 1842 Licensed Victuallers Asylum
- 18 February 1843 Pharmaceutical Society of Great Britain
- 3 April 1843 Royal Grammar School Worcester
- 27 April 1843 Queen Elizabeth's Almshouses Worcester
- 18 January 1844 Ionian Bank
- 8 March 1844 Royal College of Veterinary Surgeons
- 26 February 1845 The Law Society
- 21 August 1845 Marlborough College
- 13 January 1845 Trust and Loan Company of Upper Canada
- 30 June 1845 Metropolitan Association for Improving the Dwellings of the Industrious Classes
- 1845 Queen's College of Belfast (now Queen's University Belfast)
- 1846 Royal Bermuda Yacht Club
- 3 February 1847 Royal Society of British Artists
- 20 May 1847 Society for the Encouragement of Arts, Manufactures, and Commerce. (Royal Society of Arts)
- 17 July 1847 Eastern Archipelago Company
- 8 May 1848 Governesses Benevolent Institution
- 27 June 1848 Missionary College of Saint Augustine Canterbury
- 4 September 1848 Chemical Society
- 16 December 1848 College of Preceptors
- 1 March 1849 Warneford Lunatic Asylum (Oxford)
- 30 July 1849 Royal British Bank

==== 1850s ====
- 14 August 1850 Commissioners for the Exhibition of 1851
- 12 December 1850 Royal College of Surgeons of Edinburgh
- 5 May 1851 Educational Institute of Scotland
- 23 October 1851 Falkland Islands Company
- 23 October 1851 Leith Chamber of Commerce
- 16 July 1852 University of Trinity College, Toronto
- 8 December 1852 Université Laval, Quebec
- 5 April 1852 General Theatrical Fund Association
- 28 January 1853 Bishops University, Lennoxville, Quebec
- 13 December 1853 Wellington College
- 13 June 1853 Council and Committee of Queen's College
- 19 August 1853 Chartered Bank of India, Australia and China
- 7 April 1854 Marylebone Association for Improving the Dwellings of the Industrious Classes
- 7 April 1854 City of Worcester Association for Building Dwellings for the Labouring Classes
- 13 September 1854 Society of Accountants in Edinburgh
- 18 October 1854 London and Eastern Banking Corporation
- 7 February 1857 Society of Procurators and Solicitors in the City and Country of Perth
- 12 July 1857 Hospital for Women
- 3 February 1858 University of Sydney
- 11 January 1859 Royal Geographical Society
- 6 July 1859 Benevolent Institution for the Relief of Aged and Infirm Journeymen Tailors
- 23 September 1859 National Benevolent Institution, founded by the late Peter Herve
- 22 October 1859 High School of Dundee

==== 1860s ====
- 23 January 1860 Royal United Service Institution
- 7 March 1860 Royal National Lifeboat Institution for the Preservation of Life from Shipwreck
- 5 August 1861 Royal College of Physicians of Edinburgh
- 20 November 1861 Glasgow Art Union
- 19 July 1862 Salisbury Infirmary
- 1 November 1862 Asylum for Idiots
- 1 November 1862 Saint Andrew's College, Bradfield
- 3 February 1864 Dundee Chamber of Commerce
- 3 February 1864 Royal Orthopaedic Hospital
- 3 February 1864 Society for Relief of Widows and Orphans of Medical Men
- 7 April 1864 Natal Native Trust
- 9 July 1864 Friend of the Clergy
- 9 July 1864 Albert Middle Class College in Suffolk
- 28 July 1864 Haileybury College
- 1 November 1864 Printers' Pension, Almshouse and Orphan Asylum Corporation
- 5 December 1865 Meteorological Society
- 9 May 1866 Corporation for Middle Class Education in the Metropolis and the Suburbs thereof
- 26 July 1866 Microscopical Society
- 28 December 1866 Corporation of the Hall of Arts and Sciences (Royal Albert Hall)
- 26 February 1867 Preceptor, Patrons and Directors of Baillie's Institution in Glasgow
- 4 November 1867 Association for the Protection of Commercial Interests as respects Wrecked and Damaged Property
- 30 July 1868 Crossley Orphan Home and School
- 14 September 1868 Faculty of Actuaries in Scotland

==== 1870s ====
- 4 June 1870 Keble College, Oxford
- 6 July 1871 Incorporated Lay Body of the Church of England in Jamaica
- 17 March 1875 Royal Veterinary College
- 13 May 1875 Dundee Royal Lunatic Asylum
- 23 October 1876 North of England Institute of Mining and Mechanical Engineers
- 7 February 1877 Clifton College
- 11 July 1877 University of the Cape of Good Hope

==== 1880s ====
- 18 March 1880 Victoria University
- 24 March 1880 Institute of Chartered Accountants in England and Wales
- 2 March 1881 University of Adelaide
- 15 July 1881 Surveyors' Institution
- 31 July 1881 Royal College Colombo, Sri Lanka
- 26 August 1881 South Wales Institute of Engineers
- 18 August 1882 Selwyn College, Cambridge
- 18 August 1882 Royal Colonial Institute
- 20 April 1883 Royal College of Music
- 23 August 1883 Charing Cross Hospital
- 12 December 1883 Incorporated Society of Law Agents in Scotland
- 26 June 1884 St. Paul's Hostel, Cambridge
- 29 July 1884 Institute of Actuaries
- 11 August 1884 University College of South Wales and Monmouthshire
- 29 November 1884 Radcliffe Infirmary, Oxford
- 30 December 1884 Royal National Hospital for Consumption and Diseases of the Chest on the separate or Cottage principle
- 26 March 1885 University College of North Wales
- 19 May 1885 Queen Charlotte's Lying in Hospital
- 19 May 1885 Institute of Chemistry of Great Britain and Ireland
- 24 June 1885 Entomological Society of London
- 8 March 1886 Princess Helena College
- 14 January 1887 Royal Statistical Society
- 27 November 1887Belfast Royal Academy
- 7 February 1888 Trustees of the Buchanan Bequest
- 7 February 1888 Corporation of the Church House
- 3 May 1888 Grand Priory of the Order of the Hospital of St. John of Jerusalem in England
- 5 July 1889 Royal Historical Society
- 23 July 1889 University College of Wales, Aberystwyth (now the University of Wales, Aberystwyth)
- 19 August 1889 Queen Victoria's Jubilee Institute for Nurses
- 19 August 1889 Imperial Bank of Persia
- 15 October 1889 British South Africa Company

==== 1890s ====
- 8 February 1890 Institute of Journalists
- 21 October 1890 National Rifle Association
- 21 October 1890 Rossall School
- 21 October 1890 St. Peter's College, Radley
- 22 November 1890 Newspaper Press Fund
- 9 May 1891 Royal Provident Fund for Sea Fishermen
- 30 July 1891 Chartered Institute of Patent Agents (now the Chartered Institute of Patent Attorneys)
- 5 August 1892 Governors of the Buchanan Retreat
- 16 May 1893 Royal British Nurses' Association
- 23 November 1893 University of Wales
- 23 November 1893 Royal College of Organists
- 1894 West London Hospital
- 11 May 1895 National Society for the Prevention of Cruelty to Children
- 26 November 1897 Queen Victoria Clergy Fund
- 17 February 1898 Library Association
- 19 May 1898 Corporation of the Cranleigh and Bramley Schools
- 19 May 1898 Victorian Order of Nurses for Canada
- 9 August 1898 Royal Blind Asylum and School, Edinburgh
- 7 March 1899 St. Andrew's Ambulance Association
- 14 July 1899 Grand Antiquity Society of Glasgow
- 7 October 1899 British Home and Hospital for Incurables

=== 20th century ===
==== 1900s ====
- 3 March 1900 University of Birmingham
- 17 September 1900 City and Guilds of London Institute
- 17 September 1900 Great Northern Central Hospital
- 27 March 1901 Royal Philosophical Society of Glasgow
- 26 July 1902 British Academy for the Promotion of Historical, Philosophical and Philological Studies
- 21 August 1902 Carnegie Trust for the Universities of Scotland (revised 1978)
- 15 September 1902 Weavers Society of Anderston
- 20 October 1902 Chartered Institute of Secretaries of Joint Stock Companies and other Public Bodies
- 19 November 1902 Royal Economic Society
- 16 February 1903 Royal Edinburgh Hospital for Incurables
- 16 February 1903 Royal Society for Home Relief to Incurables, Edinburgh
- 9 July 1903 Victoria University of Manchester
- 9 July 1903 University of Liverpool
- 9 July 1903 Chartered Society of Queen Square
- 10 August 1903 University College of Nottingham
- 11 February 1904 Royal Numismatic Society
- 21 April 1904 University of Leeds
- 15 July 1904 West India Committee
- 10 August 1904 British Cotton Growing Association
- 24 October 1904 Royal Society for the Protection of Birds
- 29 May 1905 University of Sheffield
- 11 July 1905 Royal National Orthopaedic Hospital
- 11 May 1906 British and Foreign School Society
- 30 June 1906 Institute of Directors
- 1 December 1906 Hull Royal Infirmary
- 11 February 1907 Royal Warrant Holders Association
- 1 March 1907 National Museum of Wales
- 1 March 1907 National Library of Wales
- 1 June 1907 Society of Chemical Industry
- 6 July 1907 Imperial College of Science and Technology
- 2 November 1907 Royal Society of South Africa
- 21 December 1908 Bedford College for Women
- 1 August 1908 British Red Cross Society
- 17 May 1909 University of Bristol
- 10 August 1909 Royal British Colonial Society of Artists

==== 1910s ====
- 22 April 1910 Cancer Hospital (Free)
- 13 October 1910 Association of Deacons of the Fourteen Incorporated Trades of Glasgow
- 28 November 1910 Royal Institution of Naval Architects
- 23 January 1911 Royal United Kingdom Beneficent Association
- 25 May 1911 Royal Society of Painter-Etchers and Engravers
- 16 December 1911 Scout Association
- 17 January 1912 Chartered Insurance Institute
- 14 May 1912 King Edward the Seventh Welsh National Memorial Association
- 14 June 1912 British School at Rome
- 16 December 1912 King Edward VII Sanatorium
- 11 February 1913 Paton Trust
- 24 June 1913 Zoological Society of Scotland
- 7 October 1913 Royal West of England Academy
- 14 October 1913 Royal Asylum of Montrose
- 14 October 1913 Montrose Royal Infirmary
- 30 March 1914 Liverpool Merchants Guild
- 7 January 1915 Institution of Mining Engineers
- 7 January 1915 Institution of Mining and Metallurgy
- 2 June 1915 University of Tasmania
- 23 May 1916 School of Oriental Studies, London Institution
- 7 September 1916 Society for the Promotion of Nature Reserves
- 30 March 1917 Newnham College, Cambridge
- 10 May 1917 Imperial War Graves Commission (now Commonwealth War Graves Commission)
- 19 May 1917 Carnegie United Kingdom Trust
- 27 November 1917 Queen Mary's Hospital for the East End
- 14 January 1919 Carnegie Dunfermline and Hero Fund Trustees
- 24 February 1919 Incorporation of Cordiners in Glasgow
- 15 April 1919 Representative Body of the Church in Wales
- 30 May 1919 Royal Hospital and Home for Incurables, Putney
- 9 December 1919 Institute of Chartered Shipbrokers
- 9 December 1919 University College of Swansea (now Swansea University)
- 20 December 1919 King George's Fund for Sailors
- 20 December 1919 Lord Kitchener National Memorial Fund

==== 1920s ====
- 11 March 1920 Leicester Royal Infirmary
- 25 March 1920 Medical Research Council
- 25 March 1920 Forestry Commissioners
- 17 May 1920 Chamber of Shipping of the United Kingdom
- 17 May 1920 Chartered Society of Massage and Medical Gymnastics
- 28 June 1920 Royal Academy of Dramatic Art
- 13 October 1920 St. Mary's Hospital, Paddington
- 10 June 1921 Officers' Association
- 14 July 1921 Medical College of St. Bartholomew's Hospital in the City of London
- 10 August 1921 Institution of Electrical Engineers
- 11 October 1921 Empire Forestry Association
- 11 October 1921 Empire Cotton Growing Corporation
- 7 November 1921 Institute of British Foundrymen
- 13 December 1921 Royal Liverpool Seamen's Orphan Institution
- 6 February 1922 Royal Scottish Society for Prevention of Cruelty to Children
- 3 March 1922 Royal Victoria College, Montreal
- 3 March 1922 Over-Seas League
- 1 April 1922 Royal Naval Benevolent Trust (Grand Fleet and Kindred Funds)
- 5 May 1922 Incorporation of Architects in Scotland
- 20 June 1922 St. John's Foundation School
- 10 August 1922 College of Estate Management
- 6 December 1922 Toc H (Incorporated)
- 6 December 1922 Girl Guides Association
- 29 January 1923 Institution of Royal Engineers
- 12 March 1923 British Institute of Florence
- 4 May 1923 Confederation of British Industry
- 4 May 1923 Wolverhampton and Staffordshire Hospital
- 26 June 1923 Cardiff Royal Infirmary
- 11 October 1923 Dover College
- 21 March 1924 London School of Hygiene and Tropical Medicine
- 25 June 1924 Royal Life Saving Society
- 25 July 1924 Girton College, Cambridge
- 6 February 1925 The Textile Institute
- 17 March 1925 British Legion
- 12 October 1925 London Playing Fields Society
- 12 October 1925 Shakespeare Memorial Theatre, Stratford-upon-Avon
- 16 December 1925 Soldiers', Sailors' and Airmen's Families Association
- 1 February 1926 University of Reading
- 25 February 1926 Lady Margaret Hall, Oxford
- 25 February 1926 St. Hilda's College, Oxford
- 25 February 1926 Birkbeck College
- 25 February 1926 Royal Medico Psychological Association
- 30 April 1926 Somerville College, Oxford
- 1 June 1926 Royal Masonic Institution for Boys
- 1 June 1926 The Mothers' Union
- 28 June 1926 Royal Institute of International Affairs
- 28 June 1926 St. Hugh's College, Oxford
- 5 November 1926 Institute of Transport
- 20 November 1926 British Broadcasting Corporation
- 14 December 1926 National Police Fund
- 22 March 1928 British Association for the Advancement of Science
- 22 March 1928 Institute of Chartered Accountants in Australia
- 13 July 1928 Royal College of Nursing
- 14 August 1928 Royal Victoria Hospital, Dundee
- 20 November 1928 London Homeopathic Hospital (now the Royal London Hospital for Integrated Medicine)
- 20 November 1928 National Art Collection Fund
- 21 December 1928 Malvern College
- 29 January 1929 Elizabeth Garrett Anderson Hospital
- 1 March 1929 Howard Leopold Davis Scholarships Trust
- 21 March 1929 British Engineering Standards Association
- 10 May 1929 Indian Church Trustees
- 10 May 1929 Institution of Gas Engineers
- 5 July 1929 Institute of Hygiene
- 17 December 1929 King George Hospital at Ilford

==== 1930s ====
- 20 January 1930 Royal Society for the Relief of Indigent Gentlewomen of Scotland
- 28 March 1930 Institution of Mechanical Engineers
- 28 July 1930 King Edward VII's Hospital for Officers, Sister Agnes Founder
- 28 July 1930 Honourable Company of Master Mariners
- 28 July 1930 Oundle School
- 28 July 1930 East Ham Memorial Hospital
- 18 December 1930 Welsh National School of Medicine
- 29 June 1931 British Postgraduate Medical School
- 1 October 1931 Glasgow Fishmongers Company
- 7 October 1931 Australian Chemical Institute
- 7 October 1931 Royal Seamen's Pension Fund
- 11 February 1932 Universities China Committee in London
- 15 December 1932 National Playing Fields Association
- 16 March 1933 Institute of Marine Engineers
- 25 May 1933 London Library
- 26 June 1933 Westfield College, London
- 22 March 1934 Institution of Structural Engineers
- 9 November 1934 Queen Mary College
- 20 December 1934 City of London Maternity Hospital
- 21 February 1935 Cheltenham Ladies' College
- 6 June 1935 Royal Agricultural Benevolent Institution
- 13 August 1935 Institution of Engineers (India)
- 20 December 1935 Royal Academy of Dancing
- 13 April 1937 Worshipful Company of Basketmakers
- 29 July 1937 General Infirmary at Leeds
- 24 February 1938 Engineers Australia
- 25 November 1938 Roedean School
- 25 May 1939 National Association of Boy's Clubs
- 25 July 1939 Imperial Cancer Research Fund

==== 1940s ====
- 19 September 1940 British Council
- 30 May 1941 Australian Red Cross Society
- 26 June 1946 King's School, Canterbury
- 26 June 1946 Worshipful Company of Carmen
- 10 July 1946 Arts Council of Great Britain
- 10 July 1946 Institute of Fuel
- 29 January 1947 Royal College of Obstetricians and Gynaecologists
- 10 March 1947 British Postgraduate Medical Federation
- 28 October 1947 Scottish National War Memorial Trustees
- 28 October 1947 Officers Families Fund
- 9 July 1948 University of Nottingham
- 13 September 1948 Wye College
- 13 September 1948 Institution of Municipal Engineers
- 25 October 1948 British and Foreign Bible Society
- 22 December 1948 Royal Aeronautical Society
- 22 December 1948 University College of the West Indies
- 4 March 1949 National Institute for the Blind
- 30 June 1949 University College of North Staffordshire
- 25 November 1949 Railway Benevolent Institution

==== 1950s ====
- 31 March 1950 Royal Alfred Merchant Seamen's Society
- 25 April 1950 Women's Royal Naval Service Benevolent Trust
- 25 April 1950 Standards Association of Australia
- 9 October 1950 University College of Leicester
- 8 December 1950 Worshipful Company of Musicians
- 21 December 1950 Campbell College, Belfast
- 1 November 1951 Ceylon Red Cross Society
- 14 November 1951 Honourable Society of Cymmrodorion
- 24 March 1952 University of Southampton
- 9 April 1952 School of Pharmacy, University of London
- 29 April 1952 St Anne's College, Oxford
- 29 July 1952 Royal Masonic Institution for Girls
- 25 November 1952 Principal and Governors of Queen Elizabeth College
- 4 December 1952 Royal Air Forces Association
- 1 April 1953 St Antony's College, Oxford
- 30 April 1953 Faculty of Radiologists
- 20 January 1954 Australian Academy of Science
- 13 May 1954 University of Hull
- 15 July 1954 Royal Naval Association
- 21 December 1954 Queen Elizabeth House, Oxford
- 10 February 1955 University College of Rhodesia and Nyasaland
- 7 April 1955 Cuddesdon Theological College
- 7 April 1955 Seafarers Education Service
- 29 July 1955 Manchester College of Science and Technology
- 29 July 1955 Company of Farmers of the City of London
- 29 July 1955 Australasian Institute of Mining and Metallurgy
- 28 October 1955 University of Exeter
- 9 October 1956 Royal Ballet
- 15 February 1957 St. Edmund Hall, Oxford
- 22 February 1957 Institution of Chemical Engineers
- 15 March 1957 University of Leicester
- 17 May 1957 City of London Solicitors' Company
- 23 August 1957 English-Speaking Union of the Commonwealth
- 19 February 1958 British Institute of Radiology
- 14 March 1958 Nuffield College, Oxford
- 21 November 1958 Institute of Municipal Treasurers and Accountants
- 19 December 1958 Royal Humane Society
- 15 June 1959 Town Planning Institute
- 21 December 1959 Fourah Bay College - The University College of Sierra Leone

==== 1960s ====
- 8 April 1960 National Army Museum
- 3 August 1960 Churchill College, Cambridge
- 26 October 1960 Westcott House, Cambridge
- 2 August 1961 University of Sussex
- 24 October 1961 Royal Archaeological Institute
- 24 October 1961 St. Peter's College, Oxford
- 6 December 1961 University of Keele
- 21 December 1961 Chartered Institute of Loss Adjusters
- 26 February 1962 University of the West Indies
- 2 October 1962 Magistrates' Association
- 28 November 1962 Library Association of Australia
- 26 March 1963 Society of Dyers and Colourists
- 2 May 1963 Royal Society of St. George
- 30 May 1963 Association of Commonwealth Universities
- 29 July 1963 University of York
- 29 July 1963 St. Catherine's College, Oxford
- 29 July 1963 Animal Health Trust
- 27 November 1963 University of East Anglia
- 27 November 1963 University of Basutoland, the Bechuanaland Protectorate and Swaziland
- 26 March 1964 Institution of Production Engineers
- 23 June 1964 University of Strathclyde
- 23 June 1964 Liverpool Medical Institution
- 27 July 1964 University of Lancaster
- 20 November 1964 University of Kent at Canterbury
- 20 November 1964 University of Essex
- 29 January 1965 University of Warwick
- 26 February 1965 Science Research Council
- 26 February 1965 British Psychological Society
- 4 May 1965 Natural Environment Research Council
- 3 August 1965 London Mathematical Society
- 29 October 1965 Social Science Research Council
- 31 January 1966 Heriot-Watt University
- 24 February 1966 Loughborough University of Technology
- 10 March 1966 University of Aston in Birmingham
- 6 April 1966 City University, London
- 9 June 1966 Brunel University
- 28 July 1966 University of Surrey
- 28 July 1966 Fitzwilliam College, Cambridge
- 20 September 1966 University of Bradford
- 20 September 1966 Bath University of Technology
- 10 February 1967 University of Salford
- 28 June 1967 University of Dundee
- 28 July 1967 Royal College of Art
- 23 August 1967 Australian Boy Scouts Association
- 10 October 1967 Institution of Radio and Electronic Engineers, Australia
- 13 November 1967 University of Stirling
- 13 November 1967 University of Wales Institute of Science and Technology
- 22 March 1968 Royal African Society
- 1969 Royal Hong Kong Police, reverted to Hong Kong Police after Transfer of sovereignty over Hong Kong
- 23 April 1969 Open University
- 25 June 1969 Australian Academy of the Humanities for the Advancement of Scholarship in Language, Literature, History, Philosophy and the Fine Arts
- -July 1969 Australian Institute of Building
- 28 November 1969 Society for Promoting Christian Knowledge
- 28 November 1969 Cranfield Institute of Technology
- 19 December 1969 Royal College of Pathologists

==== 1970s ====
- 4 February 1970 Jockey Club (incorporating the National Hunt Committee)
- 4 February 1970 University of the South Pacific
- 28 July 1970 New University of Ulster
- 30 September 1970 Institute of Physics
- 11 March 1971 Heythrop College
- 22 December 1971 Chelsea College, University of London
- 22 December 1971 Sports Council
- 22 December 1971 Scottish Sports Council
- 22 December 1971 Sports Council for Wales
- 28 June 1972 New Hall, Cambridge
- 23 October 1972 Royal College of General Practitioners
- 24 October 1973 Anglo-German Foundation for the study of Industrial Society
- 16 October 1974 Association of Chartered Certified Accountants (ACCA)
- 12 February 1975 Institute of Cost and Management Accountants
- 12 February 1975 Institution of Metallurgists
- 18 March 1975 Institute of Measurement and Control
- 12 November 1975 College of Law
- 17 March 1976 Institution of Heating and Ventilating Engineers under title of "Chartered Institution of Building Services"
- 19 May 1976 Design Council
- 19 May 1976 Society of Industrial Artists and Designers
- 9 June 1976 Darwin College, Cambridge
- 15 September 1976 Institute of Bankers in Scotland
- 27 October 1976 Wolfson College, Cambridge
- 15 November 1977 University College London
- 25 April 1978 Carnegie Trustees for the Universities of Scotland (new)
- 6 February 1979 Institute of Arbitrators
- 14 March 1979 Building Societies Institute
- 14 March 1979 Institute of Biology

==== 1980s ====
- 13 February 1980 King's College London
- 19 March 1980 Royal Society of Chemistry (amalgamation between Royal Institute of Chemistry and Chemical Society)
- 28 July 1980 Chartered Institute of Building
- 18 February 1981 Wolfson College, Oxford
- 28 October 1981 Engineering Council
- 10 February 1982 Institute of Foresters
- 11 February 1983 University of Buckingham
- 22 June 1983 British Film Institute
- 18 May 1983 Crafts Council
- 20 April 1984 Fellowship of Engineering
- 11 April 1984 Industrial Society
- 25 June 1984 Institute of Housing
- 25 June 1984 Institution of Environmental Health Officers
- 31 July 1984 University of Ulster
- 31 July 1984 British Computer Society
- 12 September 1984 Clare Hall, Cambridge
- 30 October 1984 Robinson College, Cambridge
- 5 June 1986 Linacre College, Oxford
- 8 July 1986 London Graduate School of Business Studies
- 10 February 1987 Institute of Bankers
- 10 June 1987 University of London Institute of Education
- 23 March 1988 College of Ophthalmologists
- 27 April 1988 Motability
- 7 February 1989 The Chartered Institute of Marketing
- 2 August 1989 Queen Mary and Westfield College
- 19 December 1989 Royal Commonwealth Society for the Blind
- 1 November 1989 Goldsmiths College, University of London

==== 1990s ====
- 7 June 1990 Institute of Mathematics and its Applications
- 26 June 1990 Royal Star and Garter Home
- 21 May 1991 Henley Management College
- 11 February 1992 Royal College of Anaesthetists
- 15 July 1992 Chartered Institute of Purchasing & Supply
- 16 December 1993 Biotechnology and Biological Sciences Research Council
- 16 December 1993 Engineering and Physical Sciences Research Council
- 16 December 1993 Particle Physics and Astronomy Research Council
- 8 February 1994 Arts Council of England
- 8 February 1994 Scottish Arts Council
- 8 February 1994 Arts Council of Wales
- 15 March 1994 Chartered Institute of Taxation
- 14 December 1994 Chartered Institution of Water and Environmental Management
- 14 December 1994 Council for the Central Laboratory of the Research Councils
- 11 April 1995 Mansfield College, Oxford
- 11 April 1995 Templeton College, Oxford
- 28 June 1995 College of Optometrists
- 23 November 1995 Manchester College, Oxford
- 13 March 1996 York Borough Council
- 13 March 1996 Cardiff County Council (?)
- 26 June 1996 Sedgefield Borough Council
- 23 July 1996 North East Lincolnshire Borough Council
- 23 July 1996 Sport England
- 23 July 1996 UK Sport
- 23 July 1996 College Paediatrics and Child Health
- 26 June 1997 Landscape Institute
- 22 July 1997 Lucy Cavendish College, Cambridge
- 22 July 1997 Brighton and Hove Borough Council
- 11 February 1998 Medway Borough Council
- 11 February 1998 Historic Royal Palaces
- 22 April 1998 St Edmund's College, Cambridge
- 15 October 1998 North Lincolnshire Borough Council
- 12 October 1999 The Prince's Trust
- 24 November 1999 Royal Air Force Benevolent Fund

=== 21st century ===
==== 2000s ====
- 8 February 2000 Institute of Personnel and Development
- 12 July 2000 Royal Environmental Health Institute of Scotland
- 11 April 2001 Institution of Incorporated Engineers
- 11 December 2001 Chartered Institute of Wastes Management
- 12 February 2002 Chartered Management Institute
- 12 February 2002 Telford and the Wrekin Borough Council
- 26 June 2002 Institution of Occupational Safety and Health
- 12 June 2003 The Science Council
- 15 December 2003 Thames Valley University
- 11 February 2004 The Worshipful Company of Engineers
- 11 February 2004 The Worshipful Company of Paviors
- 8 May 2004 Society for the Environment
- 27 July 2004 Royal Photographic Society of Great Britain
- 13 October 2004 Association for Science Education
- 22 July 2005 Chartered Institute of Architectural Technologists
- 10 December 2007 Society for Radiological Protection

==== 2010s ====
10 February 2010	Worshipful Company of Constructors
10 February 2010	Worshipful Company of Launderers
10 February 2010	Chartered Institute of Internal Auditors
10 February 2010	Worshipful Company of Information Technologists
17 March 2010	Firefighters Memorial Trust
12 April 2010	Worshipful Company of Marketors
21 July 2010	Worshipful Company of Environmental Cleaners
10 November 2010	Chartered Institute of Payroll Professionals
16 March 2011	Worshipful Company of Arbitrators
7 April 2011	Chartered Institute for the Management of Sport and Physical Activity
8 June 2011	Worshipful Company of Chartered Accountants in England and Wales
13 July 2011	Oxford Centre for Islamic Studies
12 Oct 2011	Chartered Institute of Legal Executives
12 Oct 2011	Institution of Engineering Designers
30 May 2012	Worshipful Company of Builders' Merchants
30 May 2012	Worshipful Company of Lightmongers
10 July 2012	Association of Corporate Treasurers
17 October 2012	British Occupational Hygiene Society
7 November 2012	Royal College of Chiropractors
7 November 2012	Chartered Institute of Ecology and Environmental Management
12 December 2012	Marylebone Cricket Club
15 December 2013	Marine Biological Association of the United Kingdom
15 May 2013	Worshipful Company of Furniture Makers
15 May 2013	Worshipful Livery Company of Wales
15 May 2013	Worshipful Company of Hackney Carriage Drivers
13 June 2013	Worshipful Company of Chartered Surveyors
10 July 2013	Worshipful Company of World Traders
10 July 2013	Chartered Association of Building Engineers
10 July 2013	Chartered Institute of Horticulture
9 Oct 2013	Chartered Society of Forensic Sciences
30 Oct 2013	Recognition Panel
11 December 2013	Worshipful Company of Firefighters
11 December 2013	Honourable Company of Air Pilots
11 February 2014	Chartered Institute for Archaeologists
22 May 2014	Chartered Institute of Ergonomics and Human Factors
8 October 2014	Worshipful Company of Fuellers
8 October 2014	Chartered Trading Standards Institute
5 November 2014	Chartered Institute of Credit Management
10 December 2014	Chartered Association of Business Schools
11 February 2015	Worshipful Company of Insurers
10 June 2015	Chartered Institution for Further Education
10 June 2015	Learned Society of Wales
9 December 2015	Institute of Practitioners in Advertising
12 April 2016	Chartered Institute of Trade Mark Attorneys
2 October 2016	Association for Project Management
3 May 2017	National Citizen Service Trust
11 October 2017	Worshipful Company of Educators
15 November 2017	Police Roll of Honour Trust
7 November 2018	Worshipful Company of Art Scholars
12 December 2018	Chartered Institute of Information Security
10 April 2019	Worshipful Company of Chartered Architects
12 June 2019	Academy of Medical Sciences
10 July 2019	Chartered Institute of Editing and Proofreading
8 October 2019	Worshipful Company of Scientific Instrument Makers

- 11 March 2010 Homerton College, University of Cambridge

==== 2020s ====
12 February 2020	Chartered Institute of Fundraising
12 February 2020	Royal Anthropological Institute of Great Britain and Ireland
26 May 2021	Worshipful Company of Fletchers
26 May 2021	Chartered Institution of Railway Operators
21 July 2021	Royal Air Force Museum
10 November 2021	UK Cyber Security Council
19 July 2023	Chartered Institute of Export & International Trade
19 July 2023	Chartered Institute of Brewers and Distillers
21 February 2024	College of Paramedics
22 May 2024	Chartered Association of Sport and Exercise Sciences

== See also ==
- List of Canadian organizations with royal patronage
- His Majesty's Most Honourable Privy Council
