= CIPP =

CIPP may refer to:

- Certified Information Privacy Professional
- Cured-in-place pipe, a trenchless rehabilitation method used to repair existing pipelines
- CIPP evaluation model (Context, Input, Process, Product)
- The Chartered Institute of Payroll Professionals, a UK professional body.
- Capture, intermediate Purification, and Polishing (CiPP) in affinity chromatography
- Certified Integrative Psychiatric Provider
