= Upholder =

Upholder may refer to:

- HMS Upholder (P37), a British Royal Navy Second World War submarine sunk in 1942
- HMS Upholder (S40), a British Royal Navy submarine launched in 1986 and transferred to the Canadian Navy
- Upholder/Victoria-class submarine, a Royal Navy class originally named the Upholder-class
- Worshipful Company of Upholders, one of the Livery Companies of the City of London, "upholder" being an archaic word for "upholsterer"
