= Worshipful Company of Bakers =

Livery company of the City of London

Coordinates: 51.5094°N 0.0817°W

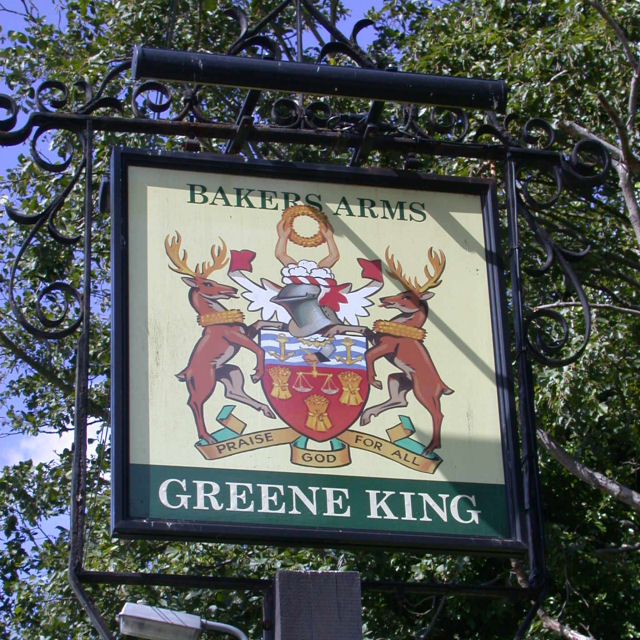
A pub sign of the Bakers Arms, Fulbourn near Cambridge, showing the coat of arms of the Worshipful Company of Bakers

The Worshipful Company of Bakers is one of the livery companies of the City of London. The Bakers' Guild is known to have existed in the twelfth century. From the Corporation of London, the Guild received the power to enforce regulations for baking, known as the Assize of Bread and Ale. The violations included selling short-weight bread and the addition of sand instead of flour. The Bread Assize remained in force until 1863, when Parliament repealed it. The Bakers' Company ranks nineteenth in the order of precedence of livery companies. The company's motto is Praise God For All.

In the 14th century, the Guild was divided into the Brown-Bakers' Guild and the White-Bakers' Guild. The Brown-Bakers were bakers of nutritious bread, while the White-Bakers were bakers of the less nutritious but more popular bread. The White Bakers were incorporated by a Royal Charter of 1509, while the Brown Bakers were incorporated in 1621. The White and Brown Bakers united into one Company in 1645. The new Company acquired a new Charter in 1686, under which it still operates.

There are many such associated trades guilds, such as the Incorporation of Bakers, one of the fourteen Incorporated Trades of Glasgow, who meet in their Robert Adam designed Trades Hall. In the medieval town of Orvieto, bakers were one of the thirty-one organized crafts. Now largely ceremonial and charitable, these crafts and guilds formerly fulfilled the role of regulation much of which is now covered by local government.

== Bakers' Hall ==
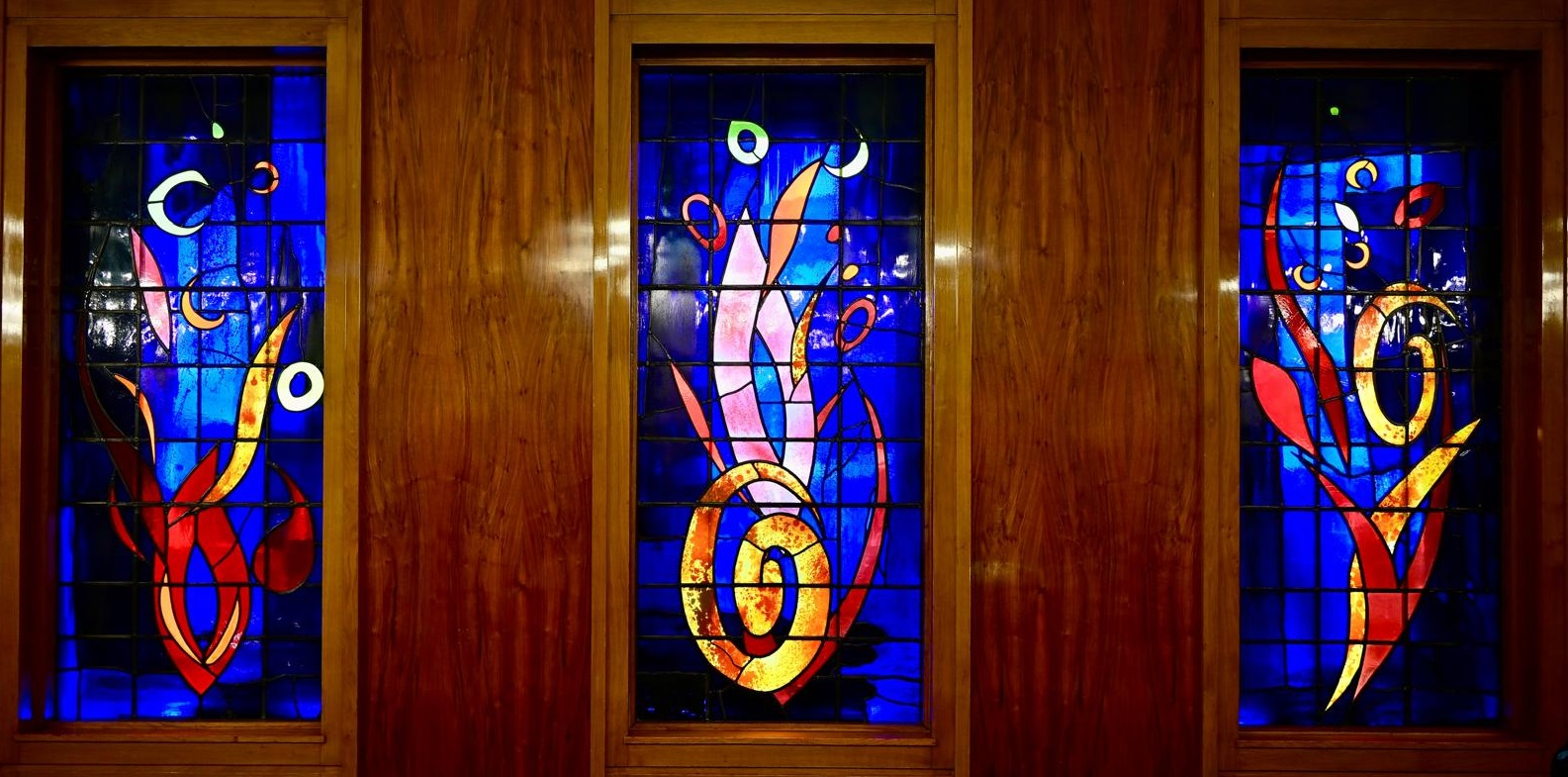
Windows by John Piper (1969)

The livery hall of the Bakers' Company has occupied its current site on Harp Lane since the early 16th century. The original hall was a mansion previously owned by John Chichele, a 15th-century Chamberlain of London, which was purchased by the Company upon his death. The hall has three times been destroyed and rebuilt due to fire. The first such calamity befell the hall in 1666 during the Great Fire of London. A replacement had been built by 1675. This structure survived only until 1715, when it was destroyed in the Thames Street Fire. The third hall on the site, which opened in 1722, was destroyed by incendiary bombing during the London Blitz of 1940. The current hall, completed in 1964, was designed by the architectural firms Trehearne and Norman and Preston and Partners, in collaboration with Past Master William Newcome-Wright. Like other post-war livery halls in London, a Modernist architectural idiom was adopted while retaining a traditional layout of function rooms. The main hall itself, which serves as the primary meeting space for the company, has high ceilings, oak panelled walls and a minstrel’s gallery. Three stained glass windows installed in 1969, designed by John Piper and manufactured by Patrick Reyntiens, show red, yellow and white flames on blue backgrounds, one for each of the three predecessor livery halls lost to fire. The hall also includes an oak-panelled court room used for formal meetings and the Charter Gallery for receptions and displays.

Coat of arms of Worshipful Company of Bakers
Crest On a wreath Or and gules, Two arms embowed issuing out of a cloud proper, holding in their hands a chaplet of wheat Or. Mantled gules, doubled argent. Escutcheon Gules, three garbs Or, on a chief harry wavy of six argent and azure two anchors of the second cabled gules; over all issuant from a cloud proper radiated in chief also Or a cubit arm descending therefrom vested of the third cuffed sable, the hand proper holding a balance gold. Supporters On either side a buck proper, attired Or, gorged with a chaplet of wheat also Or. Motto Praise God for all.

== See also ==
- National Bakery School
