= Worshipful Company of Constructors =

Livery company of the City of London

The Worshipful Company of Constructors is one of the Livery Companies of the City of London. The Company aims to bring together those professionally qualified individuals concerned with aspects of building design, execution, management, vision and economic appraisal.

The Company's origins date from 1976 when a group of members of The Faculty of Building (today, Forum for the Built Environment) met for the first inaugural meeting. The Company of Constructors was recognised by the City of London Corporation in 1985 as a City Company without Livery in 1985, and became a Livery Company in 1990.

The Constructors' Company ranks 99th in the order of precedence for Livery Companies.

== History ==
=== Key events ===
- The Company of Builders was established in 1976
- Recognised as a City Company without livery on 11 June 1985
- The grant of livery to "The Worshipful Company of Constructors" was made on 12 June 1990
- Letters Patent were presented on 20 September 1990.
- A Royal Charter of Incorporation was granted 2010. Presentation of The Charter was made by The Duke of Gloucester on 14 April 2010 in Drapers' Hall, City of London.

It is a modern company, one of 30 formed since 1948. The origins of many City Livery Companies are tied to the building crafts – Carpenters, Masons, Plaisterers, etc. Other, more recent Companies are formed from construction professions (e.g.: Chartered Surveyors, Engineers, Chartered Architects) and are restricted to an individual profession.

The Constructors' Company embraces professionals from all parts of construction, as well as those, like lawyers and accountants, who work with the industry. The Company supports fellowship, education and training and charitable giving, thus following the ancient traditions of City of London Livery Companies.

== Organisation ==
The Company is governed by a Court comprising some 30 people; some are elected officers – the Master and Wardens, for example – and others either aspire to those positions, or, like the Pastmasters, have held office and give the Court the benefit of their experience.

The Court has various committees:

- The Election Committee interviews all applicants for the Freedom of the Company.
- The General Purposes Committee deals with all financial and most other management and policy matters.
- The Scholarships and Awards Committee oversees scholarships and prizes (for example, the QUEST Award, made in partnership with the Institution of Civil Engineers, the Royal Charter International Research Award, made in conjunction with the BRE Trust, and the Sir Ian Dixon Scholarship, in conjunction with the CIOB) and is responsible for links to schools.
- The Charity Committee makes recommendations to the Trustees for disbursement of available charitable funds.
- The Privileges Committee makes recommendations on entry to the Court, and advancement within it.
- The Merchandise & Events Committee is responsible for Company Merchandise and the events programme.
- The Fundraising Committee explores partnerships with construction industry organisations which will enable the Company to further its charitable and educational work.
- The Media Committee looks at all forms of communication from the Company, printed, electronic, website and social media.

Most new members join as Freemen, in the process making certain commitments, or Obligations, to the Company. Freemen are entitled to apply to the City Chamberlain to become a Freeman of the City of London. That achieved, and after a period of satisfactory service with the Company, a Freeman can apply to become a full Liveryman, which entitles him or her to vote in City elections and attend certain events, like the United Guilds Service at St Paul's Cathedral.

Other grades of membership include:

- Yeomen – most of whom have been scholars or prize winners
- Apprentices – bound to a Liveryman or member of the Court for a prescribed period of indenture, and enrolled at Guildhall
- Companion – the widow or widower of a member of the Court or a Liveryman.

The Company has recently admitted its first International Constructors.

Fellowship is a key aspect of the Company's activities. Each year there are three formal dinners and a programme of smaller events and activities.

There are Fines and Fees for entering into the Freedom and Livery of the Company as well as an annual quarterage (subscription) charge. Members are also expected to contribute to the Charity Fund.

== Church ==
- St Lawrence Jewry
