= Chartered Institute for the Management of Sport and Physical Activity =

UK professional body

Chartered Institute for the Management of Sport and Physical Activity (CIMSPA)
- Formerly: Institute for the Management of Sport and Physical Activity (IMSPA)
- Company type: Chartered Institute
- Industry: Sport and Physical Activity
- Predecessor: Institute of Sport and Recreation Management (ISRM), Institute for Sport, Parks, and Leisure (ISPAL), Institute for Leisure and Amenity Management (ILAM)
- Founded: Royal charter sealed in 2011
- Headquarters: SportPark, Loughborough University, 3 Oakwood Drive, Loughborough, Leicestershire, East Midlands, United Kingdom
- Area served: United Kingdom
- Key people: Marc Woods (Chairperson)
- Services: Chartered status, membership, organisational partnerships, qualification endorsement, professional standards, continuing professional development (CPD), sector guidance including COVID-19 pandemic.
- Members: 18,000+ (August 2022)
- Website: https://www.cimspa.co.uk/

The Chartered Institute for the Management of Sport and Physical Activity (CIMSPA), formerly known as the Institute for the Management of Sport and Physical Activity (IMSPA), is the professional body for the United Kingdom's sport and physical activity sector. Based at Loughborough University, it has partnerships with key sporting organisations across the United Kingdom. It is recognised and partnered with Sport England and Sportscotland. It awards chartered status ('Chartered Member' and 'Chartered Fellow') to qualified professionals.

CIMSPA's goals are to establish a new set of professional standards for the sport and physical activity sector, develop an endorsement programme for awarding organisations and training providers, and have the workforce be actively engaged in CIMSPA-accredited continuing professional development.

CIMSPA was formed in 2012 when the IMSPA was awarded a royal charter. Their predecessors are the Institute of Sport and Recreation Management (ISRM), Institute for Leisure and Amenity Management (ILAM) and later Institute for Sport, Parks, and Leisure (ISPAL).

S&PA Professional is the official publication of CIMSPA. The quarterly magazine offers a mix of topical content, including in-depth features, debate on crucial industry issues, training, education and research updates in addition to relevant industry news.

== Membership ==
CIMSPA operates membership pathways for a variety of people working in sport and physical activity.

- Affiliate – For those who have an interest in the sector.
- Student – For individuals who are starting their career in the sector.
- Graduate – Prepares individuals for a smooth transition to the workplace.
- Practitioner – Membership for personal trainers, gym and group exercise instructors, strength and conditioning professionals, swimming teachers, activity coaches, frontline leisure staff and yoga, pilates and wellness practitioners.
- Management – Membership for existing and aspiring managers.

Chartered status is awarded to qualified professionals who have significant achievements within the sport and physical activity sector.

== Activities ==
=== Register of Exercise Professionals (REPs) ===
On 27 February 2020 Sport England CEO, Tim Hollingsworth, announced at the CIMSPA and Quest NBS Conference that CIMSPA and UK Coaching signed a deal to combine the Register of Exercise Professionals (REPs) with the CIMSPA Exercise and Fitness Directory to create a single directory for all exercise and fitness professionals. This is the first time that the entire workforce within sport and physical activity have had a single professional body to represent them.

=== COVID-19 pandemic ===
During the COVID-19 pandemic, CIMSPA launched a digital hub to support the sport and physical activity sector. The hub, located on the CIMSPA website, brought together information, advice and practical support for all those working in sport and physical activity who were impacted by the crisis and is freely available to anyone working in the sector. Later in the pandemic, CIMSPA launched ReTrain to Retain which offered support for ~50,000 sport and physical activity professionals and volunteers who’ve had to find work outside the sector or had their hours reduced.

=== Digital Marketing Hub ===
At the end of September 2021, CIMSPA partnered with tech giant Google and British fitness coach, TV presenter, social media personality and author Joe Wicks to launch the Digital Marketing Hub for sport and physical activity. Supported with National Lottery (United Kingdom) and Sport England funding, and powered by content from the Digital Marketing Institute, The CIMSPA Digital Marketing Hub was made to help people and organisations improve how they apply digital marketing tools and techniques, to encourage more people to play sport and be active.

== See also ==
- List of organisations with a Royal Charter
- List of professional associations in the United Kingdom
- School of Sport, Exercise and Health Sciences, at Loughborough
