= The Seafarers' Charity =

British charitable organization

The Seafarers' Charity

The Seafarers' Charity is a non-governmental organisation which supports seafarers and their families around the world through grants to maritime welfare organisations.

It was established in the UK in 1917 as The King George’s Fund for Sailors, to support the families of seafarers lost at sea during the First World War. Today The Seafarers' Charity raises money and awards grants to a range of delivery partners addressing the challenges of modern seafaring life.

The charity supports, through fundraising and grant making, projects aimed at anyone who makes a living at sea, including seafarers in the Merchant Navy, Fishing Fleets, and Royal Navy.

In 2025 it awarded £2.7m in grants to support more than 50 maritime welfare projects.

The Seafarers’ Charity is also an active advocate for seafarer wellbeing and has select observer status at the International Maritime Organization (IMO).

== History ==
The First World War took a terrible toll on seafarers and towards the end of the war many small charitable organisations were set up in the UK to support the injured and bereaved.

In 1917 a group of shipowners and officers set up a central body which would collect funds in war time, part of which could be conserved for disbursement in peace time. This umbrella fund directed these resources to where they were most needed. His Majesty King George V took a personal interest in this fund and lent it both his name and an establishing donation of £5,000. Since its foundation, the charity has always had the reigning British monarch as its patron.

In 2005 King George's Fund for Sailors adopted the working name Seafarers UK. This was changed in 2021 to The Seafarers' Charity, to make it clearer how the charity supports seafarers in the Commonwealth (long part of its remit) and throughout the world.

== Advocacy ==
Each year The Seafarers' Charity campaigns on behalf of seafarers across the Merchant Navy, Royal Navy and Fishing Fleets, as well as in other maritime sectors, (e.g. professional yacht crew), to raise awareness of the important role seafarers play in society.

The charity helps to deal with challenges including harassment and sexual violence at sea, psychological safety, financial insecurity, the strain on separated families, and the poverty and hardship that too often afflict shoreline communities.

During the Covid-19 pandemic, along with organisations including the International Chamber of Shipping, the charity was a founding member of the Seafarers International Relief Fund (SIRF) which supported seafarers unable to leave or join ships due to travel restrictions.

The charity is a co-organiser of the Annual National Service for Seafarers at St Paul’s Cathedral in London, which brings together the global maritime community to celebrate the services that seafarers provide and the sacrifices they make. It also set up the UK's National Fishing Remembrance Day following a request from the UK government.

=== Fly the Red Ensign for Merchant Navy Day ===
In 2015 the charity launched its 'Fly the Red Ensign’ campaign to coincide with Merchant Navy Day on 3 September. The campaign encourages communities and public bodies to fly the Red Ensign, the official flag of the UK Merchant Navy, to raise public awareness of the UK's dependence on seafarers.

In 2025 and previous years, the Red Ensign was flown above 10 Downing Street and on other public buildings throughout the UK.

== Fundraising ==
The Seafarers' Charity receives no statutory funding and relies on supporters, donors and volunteers to be able to carry on providing long-term support. Annually, the charity runs a number of fundraising ‘challenge’ events including the London Marathon and the 24 Peaks Challenge.

== Partner organisations ==
The Seafarers' Charity works with numerous partner organisations across all its campaigning, fundraising and grant-giving work, such as ISWAN, Stella Maris, Trinity House, Mission to Seafarers and Sailors' Society.

It is a founding partner of the International Fund for Fishing Safety, and a member of the Maritime Charities Group.

== Governance ==
The Seafarers' Charity's governing document is the Royal Charter, first issued in 1920 and last amended in 2025. The Royal Charter describes The Seafarers' Charity's charitable objects as:

- The relief of seafarers, their families or dependants, who are in need
- The education and training of people of any age to prepare for work or service at sea
- The promotion of the efficiency and effectiveness of the maritime charitable sector and
- The promotion of safety at sea.

== Leadership ==
=== Patron ===
His Majesty King Charles III (2024 to present)

Her Late Majesty Queen Elizabeth II (1951-2022)

=== President ===
Prince Edward, Duke of Edinburgh

=== Chair ===
Paul Butterworth AFNI

=== Chief Executive ===
Deborah Layde
