= Glasgow Trades Hall =

Building in Glasgow, Scotland

Coordinates: 55°51′34″N 4°14′56″W

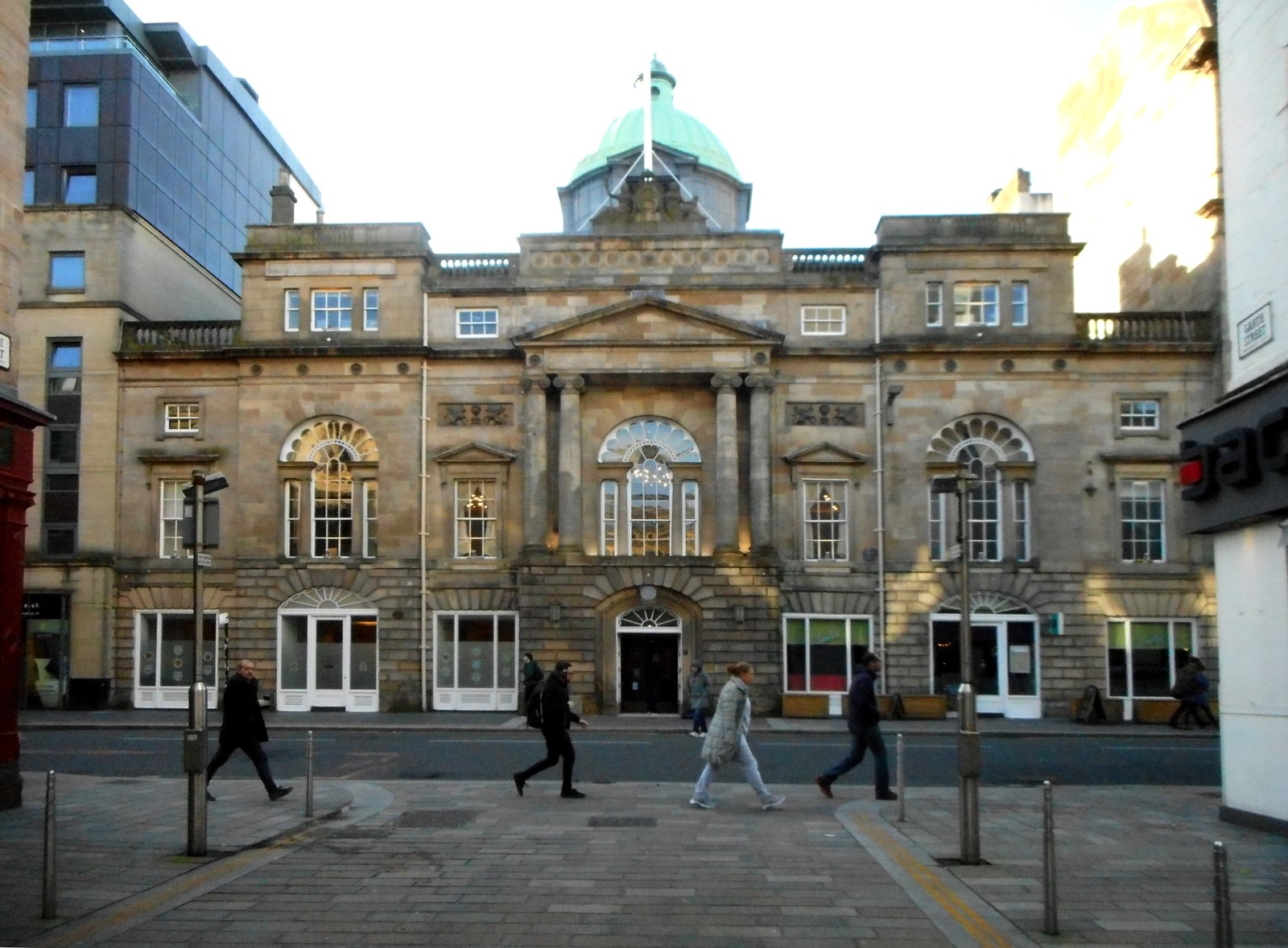
Glasgow Trades Hall in 2020

The Glasgow Trades Hall in Glasgow, Scotland, was built in 1791–1794 to serve as a public hall and meeting place for the city's Trades House and 14 Incorporated Crafts.

These trades are Hammermen, Tailors, Cordiners, Maltmen, Weavers, Bakers, Skinners, Wrights, Coopers, Fleshers, Masons, Gardeners, Barbers, Bonnetmakers and Dyers. Each year they elect members of the Trades House, headed by the Deacon Convener of the Trades.

The Trades House of Glasgow was created at the time of reform of Glasgow's local government in 1605. At that time the electorate was basically divided into two groups, the Merchants and the Craftsmen. The Craft Incorporations or Guilds comprised the trades Rank of Burgesses under the leadership of the deacon convener, who was given a council. This included the Craft leaders and is the body now recognised as the Trades House.

Designed by Robert Adam and completed by David Hamilton, with various subsequent reconstructions, the building was designated as a Category A listed building in 1966.

== See also ==
- Incorporated Trades of Edinburgh
- Seven Incorporated Trades of Aberdeen
