= Bespoke Tailors' Benevolent Association =

Coordinates: 51.54640015387067°N 0.15413354233363655°W

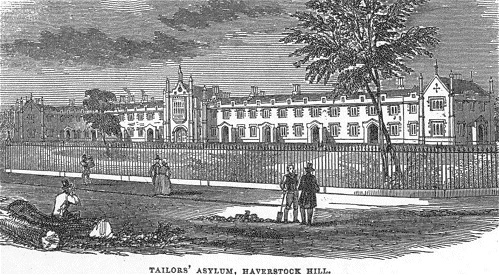
The Tailors' Asylum on its original site.

The Bespoke Tailors' Benevolent Association is a charity supporting journeyman tailors no longer able to work due to blindness, illness or old age, and those tailors' spouses. As of 2022, it was run by ten trustees and 15 volunteers.

== History ==
It was formed on 10 February 1837 as the Benevolent Institution for the Relief of Aged and Infirm Journeymen Tailors. Its founder and first president was a successful West End tailor named John Stultz. It purchased land at the south end of Queens Crescent, just off Haverstock Hill in north London, where between 1842 and 1843 it built the Tailors' Asylum. This consisted of ten almshouses (the southernmost of which was occupied by the chaplain) and a central chapel consecrated by Charles James Blomfield, Bishop of London, all in brick and stone in the neo-Gothic style designed by T Meyer. On 6 July 1859 it was granted a royal charter.

In 1937, the Institution sold off the site to the London County Council, which built council flats on it, though the charity moved to a new building in South Croydon and in 1952, to a third one in Wandsworth. They finally moved out of the Wandsworth site, which was rebuilt (but kept at the disposal of the tailoring trade) as Tailors' Court by the Shaftesbury Housing Association. The charity's records before 1965 are now at the London Metropolitan Archives.
