= Worshipful Company of Poulters =

Livery company of the City of London

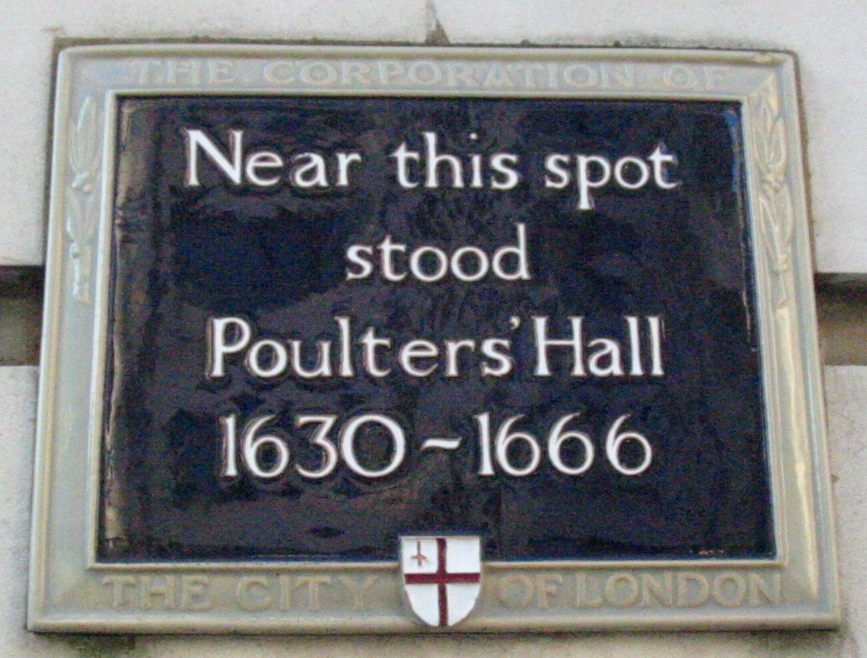
The Poulters occupied a hall in Butcher Hall Lane from 1630 until the hall was destroyed in the Great Fire of London

The Worshipful Company of Poulters is one of the Livery Companies of the City of London. In 1368, the organization received the power to regulate the sale of poultry, swans, pigeons, rabbits, and small game. The company, which was incorporated under a Royal Charter in 1665, is no longer an association of tradesmen that retains its ancient powers, but now operates as a charitable institution, as do most of the other Livery Companies.

The Poulters' Company ranks thirty-fourth in the order of precedence of Livery Companies. Its motto is Remember Your Oath.

== Arms ==
Coat of arms of Worshipful Company of Poulters
Crest On a mural coronet a stork with wings expanded proper. Escutcheon Argent, on a chevron azure between three storks proper as many swans argent. Supporters Two pelicans with wings addorsed (Or) vulning their breast gules. Motto Remember your oath.
