= Royal British Colonial Society of Artists =

The Royal British Colonial Society of Artists (RBC) was founded in 1887 as the Royal Anglo Australian Society of Artists and received its royal charter under its later name in 1907.

Its members were artists from Britain (notably members of the Newlyn School), South Africa, Canada, India, New Zealand and Australia.

It is known to have held an exhibition at the Royal Institute Galleries in London in 1937 and this is believed to have been its last.
