= Independent Age =

Charity supporting older people

- Founded: 1863
- Type: Registered charity
- Registration no.: "Independent Age, registered charity no. 210729". Charity Commission for England and Wales.
- Purpose: Poverty, older people, benefits advice
- Location: London, United Kingdom
- Region served: United Kingdom
- Method: Grants, advocacy, advice services
- Key people: Joanna Elson CBE (CEO)
- Website: www.independentage.org

Independent Age is a British charity that supports and advises older people experiencing financial hardship. The organisation was originally formed in 1863 and is legally registered as the Royal United Kingdom Beneficent Association.

== History ==
Independent Age was founded in 1863 as the United Kingdom Beneficent Association (UKBA), a voluntary society created to provide an alternative to the Victorian workhouse system under the New Poor Law for members of the upper and middle classes experiencing financial hardship. The organisation offered small lifelong annuities to individuals living on under £25 per year, including those over the age of 40 unable to work due to disability, and women over 60 or men over 65.

In 1911, the UKBA was incorporated under Royal Charter and renamed the Royal United Kingdom Beneficent Association (RUKBA). The change enabled the charity to own property in its own name. In 1948, RUKBA opened a residential care home following the 1947 Nuffield Foundation report, Old People.

The organisation rebranded as Independent Age in 2005 and merged with Counsel and Care and the Universal Beneficent Society in 2011.

The organisation's chief executive is Joanna Elson CBE, formerly chief executive of the Money Advice Trust. She is also a director at UK Finance and chair of the advisory board at the University of Birmingham's Centre on Household Assets and Savings Management.

== Activities ==
In 2024, Independent Age launched a £2.8 million grants programme aimed at advice-based organisations supporting older people in deprived areas across England, Scotland and Wales.

In 2025, the charity launched its Frozen and Forgotten campaign, focusing on fuel poverty awareness following changes to the Winter Fuel Payment.

== See also ==
- Pension Credit
- Fuel poverty in the United Kingdom
- Social care in the United Kingdom
- Poverty in the United Kingdom
