= Montrose Royal Infirmary =

- NHS Tayside
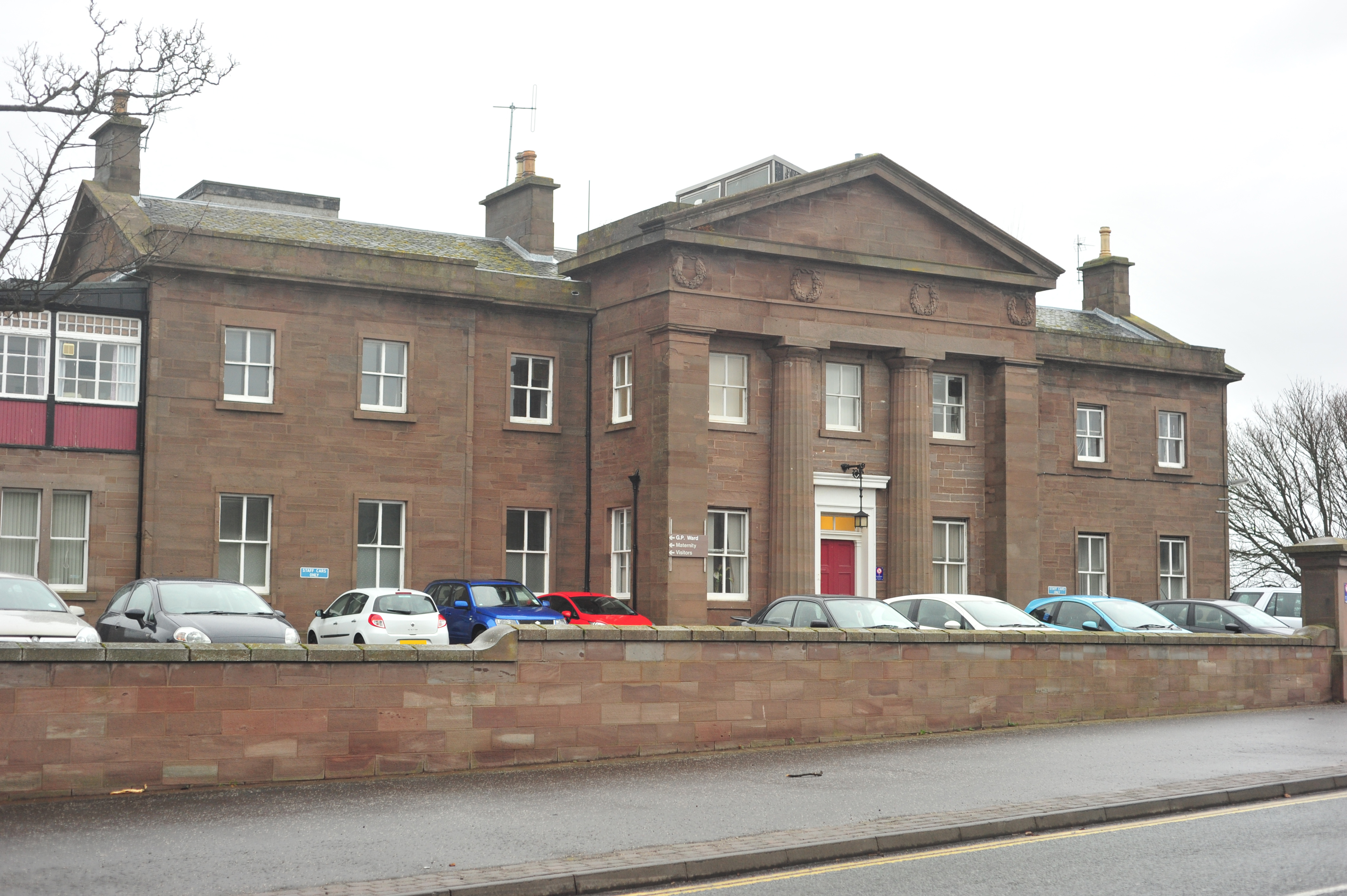
- Montrose Royal Infirmary

- Shown in Angus

Geography
- Location: Bridge Street, Montrose, Scotland
- Coordinates: 56.7078°N 2.4746°W

Organisation
- Care system: NHS Scotland
- Type: General

History
- Founded: 1839
- Closed: 2018

Links
- Lists: Hospitals in Scotland

Montrose Royal Infirmary was a health facility in Bridge Street, Montrose, Angus, Scotland. It was managed by NHS Tayside. It is a Category A listed building.

== History ==
The facility, which was designed by James Collie in the Greek Revival style, opened as the Montrose Infirmary in 1839. It was granted a Royal charter in October 1913. After joining the National Health Service in 1948, it became a community hospital. Following the transfer of services to Ninewells Hospital in Dundee, Montrose Royal Infirmary closed in April 2018.
