= Worshipful Company of Upholders =

Livery company of the City of London

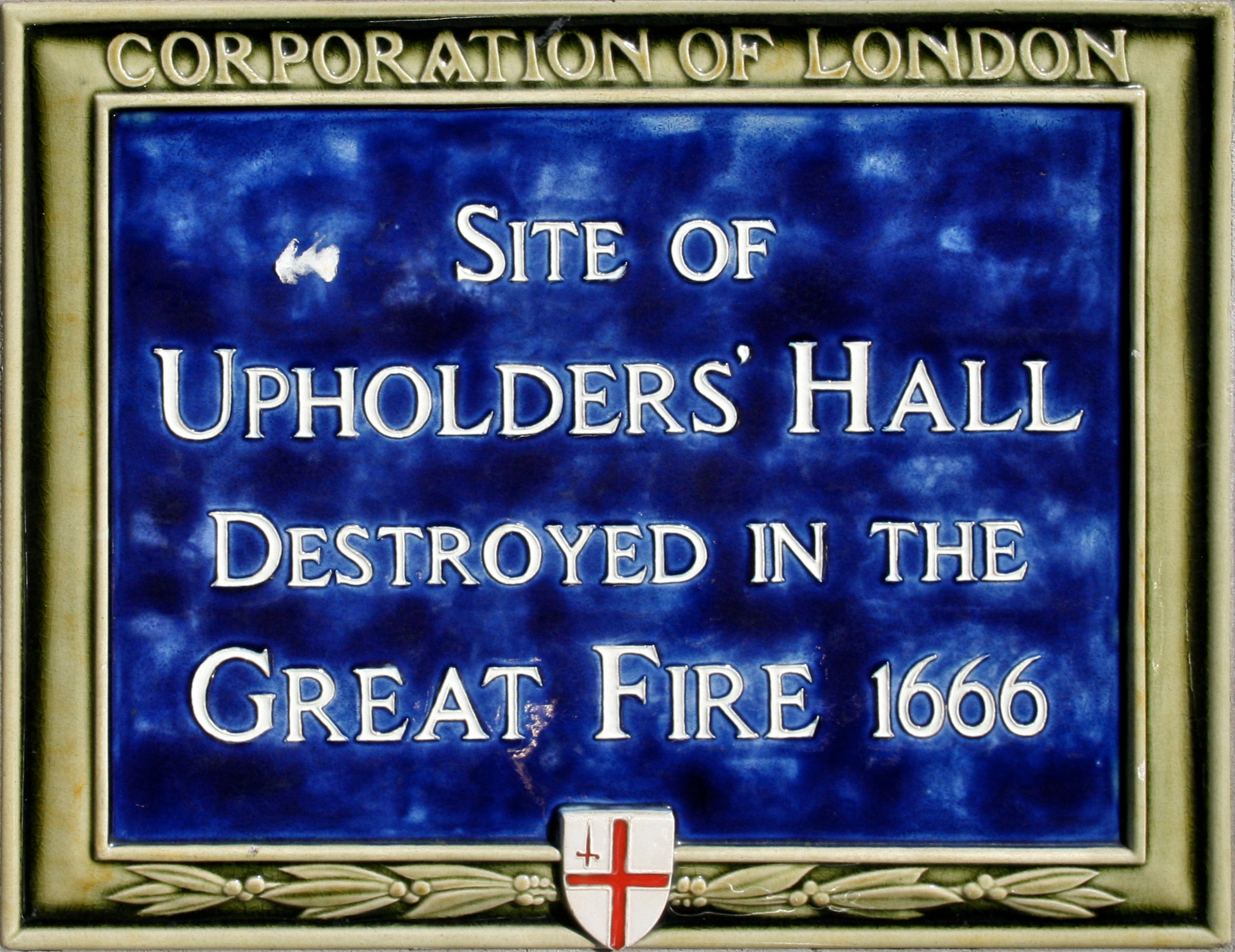
Plaque noting the site of the Upholders' Hall, which was destroyed in 1666.

The Worshipful Company of Upholders is one of the Livery Companies of the City of London. "Upholder" is an archaic word for "upholsterer". In past times, upholders did not just manufacture and sell upholstered goods but were cabinet makers, undertakers, soft furnishers, auctioneers, and valuers. The organisation was formed on 1 March 1360 and officially incorporated by a Royal Charter granted by Charles I in 1626. The Company originally had the right to set standards for upholstery within London and to search, seize and destroy defective upholstery. However, over the years, the Company's power has eroded, as has the profession of upholsterers, because of the advancement of technology.

The Livery's purpose today is:

To Uphold the livery of the Upholders, ensuring it continues to flourish. Upholding the craft of the Upholder and through charitable giving uphold individuals and organisations connected with our trade and Livery.

To celebrate the 400th anniversary of its first charter, this year, the Livery is sponsoring a project with 12 Cathedrals and 1 prison to create the most significant piece of Opus Anglicanum embroidery to be made in 500 years. The embroidery has been designed by international iconographer Aidan Hart, well known for designing the Royal Anointing Screen used at the coronation of King Charles III. All practical training, support and project management will be provided by the Royal School of Needlework. The embroidery is being completed by over 100 volunteer stitchers. In St Pauls, Durham, Liverpool, Lincoln, Exeter, St Albans, Winchester, Salisbury, Southwell, Derby, Norwich and Lichfield cathedrals and the charity Fine Cell Work. The Circle of Life has been designed with 25 detailed Opus Anglicanum panels, depicting the participating cathedrals, the Upholders’ Armorial Bearings and the Company’s history.

In support of the upholstery and soft furnishing trade, the Livery provides prizes and bursaries to students studying these crafts. It gives Merit Awards to companies achieving the highest standards of craftsmanship and Master Craftsman awards to individuals. Working closely with the Association of Master Upholsterers and Soft Furnishers, it is developing a "Centres of Excellence" scheme for colleges and other organisations to ensure traditional upholstery skills are taught and passed on to professionals and enthusiasts. In 2017, the first Upholders' apprentice to complete his training through the Livery Companies' Apprenticeship Scheme was awarded his certificate by the Lord Mayor of London. In addition to working with the AMUSF, the company supports the Guild of Traditional Upholsterers. The Livery provides several pensions to special-needs pensioners who have worked in the trade.

Upholders arranged the funeral of Admiral Lord Nelson, and the Livery is proud to include undertakers today. Members of the company continue to be involved with the funerals of national figures. The Livery also works with SAIF and NAFD and other associations involved with funerals. The name Undertaker also has Upholder as its root.

The Upholders Charity supports the charitable aims of the Livery. This charity incorporates the earlier Peter Jackson and the Neville Hayman Charities. It supports its crafts & artisans especially through training and other charities connected with the City of London and the armed forces. The Livery maintains its connections with TS Upholder, the Chelmsford Sea Cadet unit.

The Livery and Liverymen are actively involved in many organisations and charities in the City of London, including Castle Baynard Ward Club, as the site of the Company's Hall until the Great Fire in 1666 is in the Ward. The Company is the forty-ninth in the order of precedence for Livery Companies. Its motto is Sustine Bona, Latin for Uphold the Good.
