= Chartered Institute of Payroll Professionals =

Professional association in the UK

- Company type: Non-profit
- Founded: 1980; 46 years ago
- Headquarters: Shirley, Solihull
- Area served: United Kingdom
- Key people: Jason Davenport (CEO)
- Website: cipp.org.uk

The Chartered Institute of Payroll Professionals (CIPP) is a chartered professional association in the United Kingdom, representing payroll, pensions and reward professionals. It has 9,500 members and is registered with the UK government for providing training, higher education and qualifications. It is a member of the government Employment and Payroll Group, HMRC's principal consultation forum for employers and their intermediaries and the Compliance Reform Forum in which HMRC consults about changes to HMRC compliance checking activities.
