= Worshipful Company of Plaisterers =

Livery company of the City of London

- Motto: Let Brotherly Love Continue
- Location: Plaisterers' Hall, One London Wall, London, EC2Y 5JU
- Date of formation: 1501
- Company association: Plastering
- Order of precedence: 46th
- Website: plaistererslivery.co.uk

The Worshipful Company of Plaisterers is one of the livery companies in the City of London. The Plaisterers' Company was incorporated under a Royal Charter in 1501 and whilst the spelling used in the charter was "Plaisterer", some later charters used the alternative spelling of "plasterer", nonetheless, the company uses the original spelling.

The company originated as a trade association of London's plasterers. Today, it maintains a connection with the trade by establishing plastering standards and by officially accrediting plasterers. The company is also a charitable and educational institution and generates income by renting out the hall on a private hire basis for events.

The Plaisterers' Company ranks forty-sixth in the Order of Precedence of the City livery companies. Its motto is Let Brotherly Love Continue.

The company's first hall was bequeathed by William Elder, Citizen and Plaisterer in 1556. It was situated on the corner of Addle Street and Philip Lane but was destroyed in the Great Fire of London in 1666. Its second hall was built in 1669 to the design of Christopher Wren, although this too was destroyed by fire in 1882. The third hall on the site was destroyed during the Blitz in 1940.

Its current hall, opened in November 1972, has décor throughout of the neo-classical style created by Robert Adam in the 18th century. His various designs have been faithfully reproduced in great detail both on plaster and wood, some being taken from his original moulds. Plaisterers' Hall is the largest and one of the finest City livery halls in London.

Plaisterer's Hall Academy (1744–54) was a dissenting academy that provided for the training of Congregational ministers.
