= Magna Carta =

English charter of freedoms made in 1215

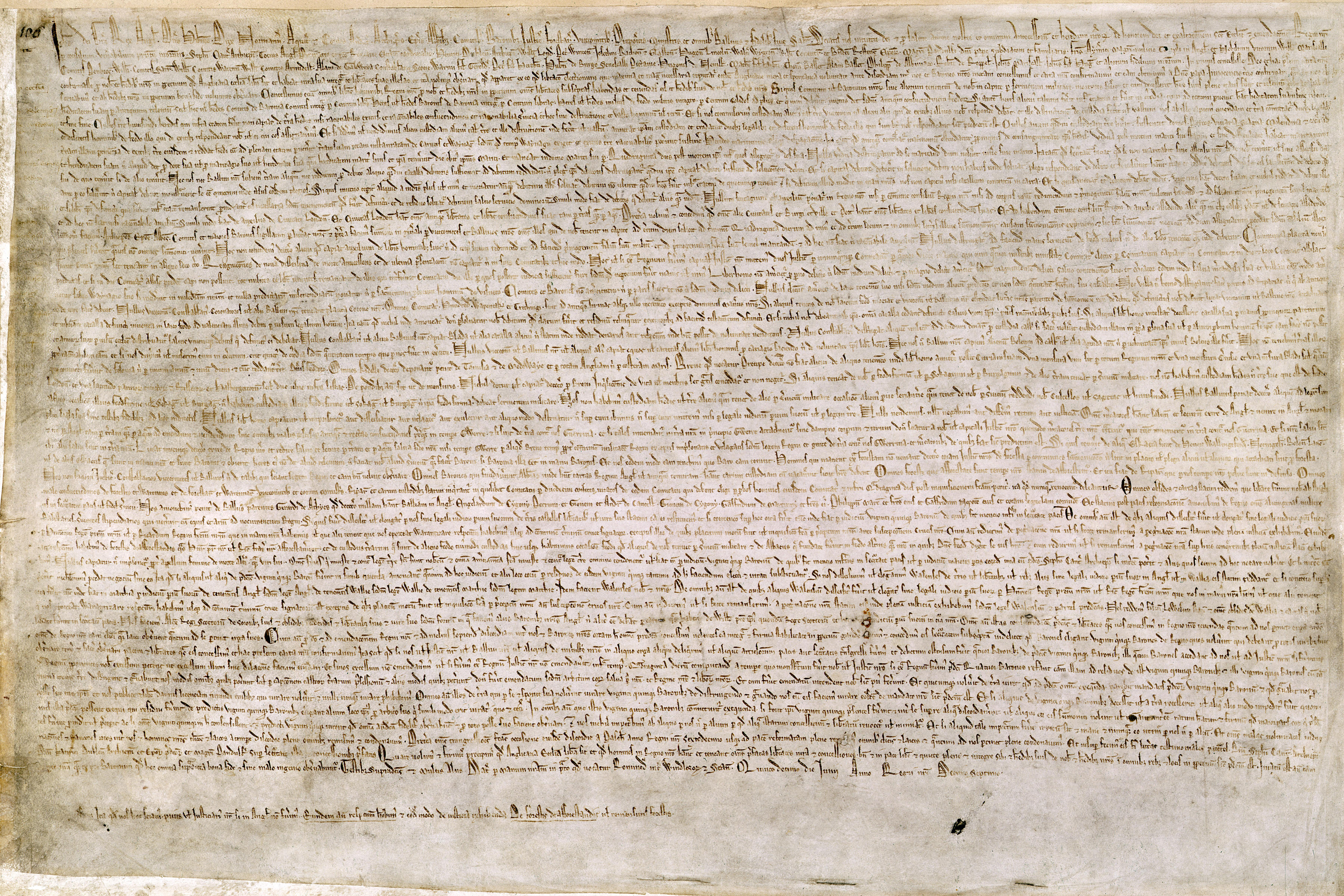
- Cotton MS. Augustus II. 106, one of four surviving exemplifications of the 1215 text
- Created: 1215; 811 years ago
- Location: Two at the British Library; one each in Lincoln Castle and in Salisbury Cathedral
- Authors: John, King of England; His barons; Stephen Langton, Archbishop of Canterbury
- Purpose: Peace treaty

Full text
- Magna Carta at Wikisource

Magna Carta (Medieval Latin for "Great Charter"), sometimes spelled Magna Charta, (Note: The document's Latin name is spelled either Magna Carta or Magna Charta (the pronunciation is the same), and may appear in English with or without the definite article "the". The spelling Charta originates in the 18th century, as a restoration of classical Latin charta for the Medieval Latin spelling carta. While "Charta" remains an acceptable variant spelling, it never became prevalent in English usage. The article is more commonly omitted. Latin does not have a definite article equivalent to "the".) is a royal charter of rights sealed by King John of England at Runnymede, near Windsor, on 15 June 1215. (Note: Within this article, dates before 14 September 1752 are in the Julian calendar. Later dates are in the Gregorian calendar.) First drafted by the Archbishop of Canterbury, Cardinal Stephen Langton, to make peace between the unpopular king and a group of rebel barons who demanded that the King confirm the Charter of Liberties, it promised the protection of church rights, protection for the barons from illegal imprisonment, access to swift and impartial justice, and limitations on feudal payments to the Crown, to be implemented through a council of 25 barons. Neither side stood by their commitments, and the charter was annulled by Pope Innocent III, leading to the First Barons' War.

After John's death, the regency government of his young son, Henry III, reissued the document in 1216, stripped of some of its more radical content, in an unsuccessful bid to build political support for their cause. At the end of the war in 1217, it formed part of the peace treaty agreed at Lambeth, where the document acquired the name "Magna Carta", to distinguish it from the smaller Charter of the Forest, which was issued at the same time. Short of funds, Henry reissued the charter again in 1225 in exchange for a grant of new taxes. His son, Edward I, repeated the exercise in 1297, this time confirming it as part of England's statute law. However, Magna Carta was not unique; other legal documents of its time, both in England and beyond, made broadly similar statements of rights and limitations on the powers of the Crown. The charter became part of English political life and was typically renewed by each monarch in turn. As time went by and the fledgling Parliament of England passed new laws, it lost some of its practical significance.

At the end of the 16th century, there was an upsurge of interest in Magna Carta. Lawyers and historians at the time believed that there was an ancient English constitution, going back to the days of the Anglo-Saxons, that protected individual English freedoms. They argued that the Norman invasion of 1066 had overthrown these rights and that Magna Carta had been a popular attempt to restore them, making the charter an essential foundation for the contemporary powers of Parliament and legal principles such as habeas corpus. Although this historical account was flawed, jurists such as Sir Edward Coke invoked Magna Carta extensively in the early 17th century, arguing against the divine right of kings. Both James I and his son Charles I attempted to suppress the discussion of Magna Carta. The political myth of Magna Carta as a medieval revival of ancient personal liberties persisted after the Glorious Revolution of 1688 until well into the 19th century. It influenced the early American colonists in the Thirteen Colonies and the formation of the United States Constitution, which became the supreme law of the land in the new republic of the United States.

Research by Victorian historians showed that the original 1215 charter had concerned the medieval relationship between the monarch and the barons, and not ordinary subjects. The majority of historians now see the interpretation of the charter as a unique and early charter of universal legal rights as a myth that was created centuries later. Despite the changes in views of historians, the charter has remained a powerful, iconic document, even after almost all of its content was repealed from the statute books in the 19th and 20th centuries. Magna Carta still forms an important symbol of liberty today, often cited by politicians and campaigners, and is held in great respect by the British and American legal communities, Lord Denning describing it in 1956 as "the greatest constitutional document of all times—the foundation of the freedom of the individual against the arbitrary authority of the despot". In the 21st century, four exemplifications of the original 1215 charter remain in existence, two at the British Library, one at Lincoln Castle and one at Salisbury Cathedral. These are recognised by UNESCO on its Memory of the World international register. There are also a handful of the subsequent charters in public and private ownership, including copies of the 1297 charter in both the United States and Australia. The 800th anniversary of Magna Carta in 2015 included extensive celebrations and discussions, and the four original 1215 charters were displayed together at the British Library. None of the original 1215 Magna Carta is currently in force since it has been repealed; however, three clauses of the original charter are enshrined in the 1297 version and remain in force in England and Wales. (Note: These were 1 (part), 13, 39, and 40 of the 1215 charter, being clauses 1, 9, and 29 of the 1297 statute. Although scholars refer to the 63 numbered "clauses" of Magna Carta, this is a modern system of numbering, introduced by Sir William Blackstone in 1759; the original charter formed a single, long unbroken text.)

== History ==
=== 13th century ===
==== Background ====
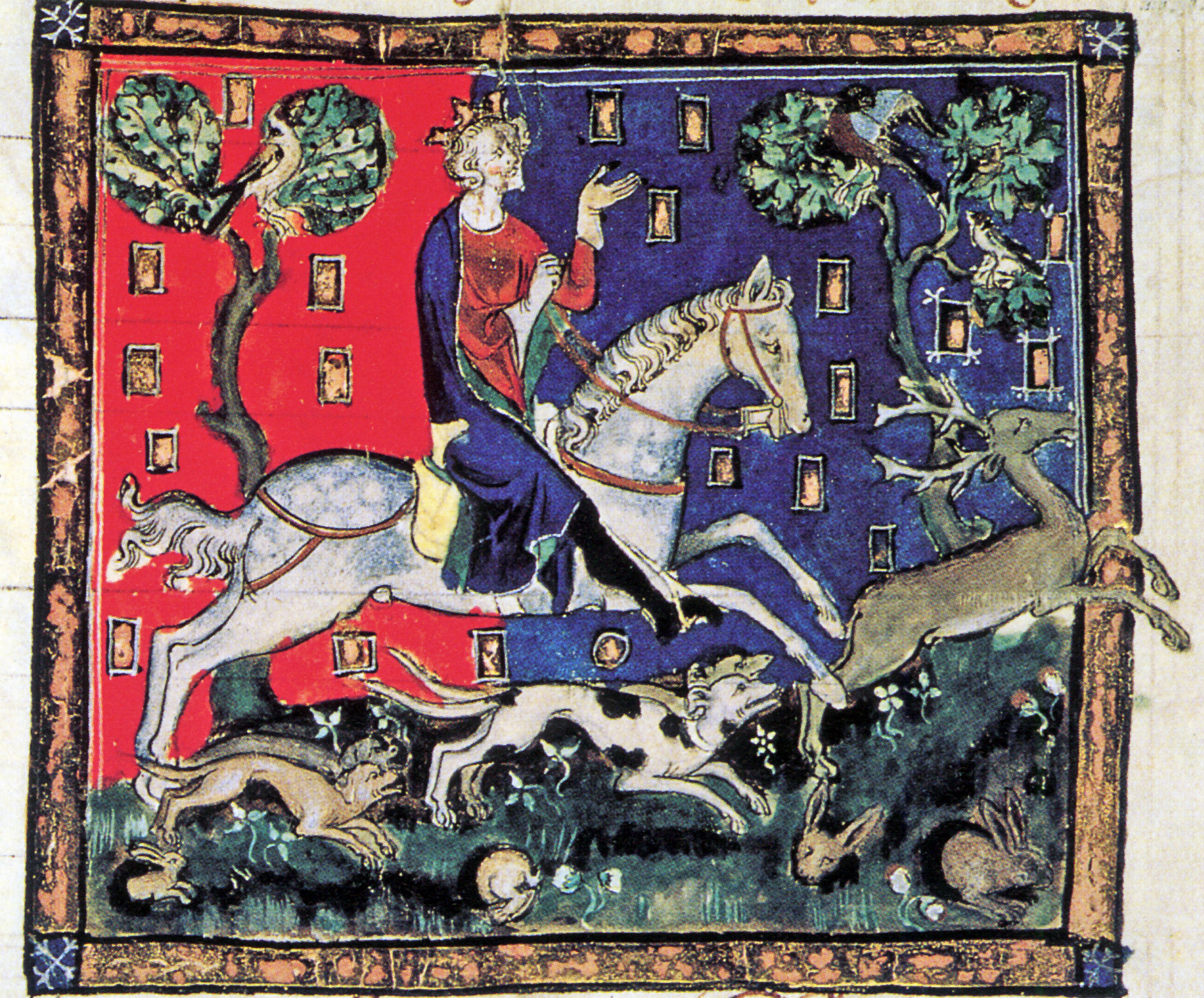
King John on a stag hunt

Magna Carta originated as an unsuccessful attempt to achieve peace between royalist and rebel factions in 1215, as part of the events leading to the outbreak of the First Barons' War. England was ruled by King John, the third of the Angevin kings. Although the kingdom had a robust administrative system, the nature of government under the Angevin monarchs was ill-defined and uncertain. John and his predecessors had ruled using the principle of vis et voluntas, or "force and will", taking executive and sometimes arbitrary decisions, often justified on the basis that a king was above the law. Many contemporary writers believed that monarchs should rule in accordance with the custom and the law, with the counsel of the leading members of the realm, but there was no model for what should happen if a king refused to do so.

John had lost most of his ancestral lands in France to King Philip II in 1204 and had struggled to regain them for many years, raising extensive taxes on the barons to accumulate money to fight a war which ended in expensive failure in 1214. Following the defeat of his allies at the Battle of Bouvines, John had to sue for peace and pay compensation. John was already personally unpopular with many of the barons, many of whom owed money to the Crown, and little trust existed between the two sides. A triumph would have strengthened his position, but in the face of his defeat, within a few months after his return from France, John found that rebel barons in the north and east of England were organising resistance to his rule.

The rebels took an oath that they would "stand fast for the liberty of the church and the realm", and demanded that the King confirm the Charter of Liberties that had been declared by King Henry I in the previous century, and which was perceived by the barons to protect their rights. The rebel leadership was unimpressive by the standards of the time, even disreputable, but were united by their hatred of John; Robert Fitzwalter, later elected leader of the rebel barons, claimed publicly that John had attempted to rape his daughter, and was implicated in a plot to assassinate John in 1212.

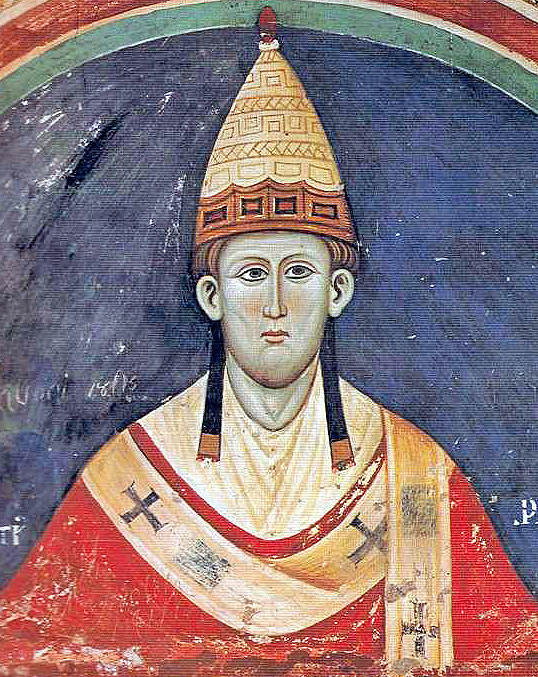
A mural of Pope Innocent III, c. 1219

John held a council in London in January 1215 to discuss potential reforms, and sponsored discussions in Oxford between his agents and the rebels during the spring. Both sides appealed to Pope Innocent III for assistance in the dispute. During the negotiations, the rebellious barons produced an initial document, which historians have termed "the Unknown Charter of Liberties", which drew on Henry I's Charter of Liberties for much of its language; seven articles from that document later appeared in the "Articles of the Barons" and the subsequent charter.

It was John's hope that the Pope would give him valuable legal and moral support, and accordingly John played for time; the King had declared himself to be a papal vassal in 1213 and correctly believed he could count on the Pope for help. John also began recruiting mercenary forces from France, although some were later sent back to avoid giving the impression that the King was escalating the conflict. In a further move to shore up his support, John took an oath to become a crusader, a move which gave him additional political protection under church law, even though many felt the promise was insincere.

Letters backing John arrived from the Pope in April, but by then the rebel barons had organised into a military faction. They congregated at Northampton in May and renounced their feudal ties to John, marching on London, Lincoln, and Exeter. John's efforts to appear moderate and conciliatory had been largely successful, but once the rebels held London, they attracted a fresh wave of defectors from the royalists. The King offered to submit the problem to a committee of arbitration with the Pope as the supreme arbiter, but this was not attractive to the rebels. Stephen Langton, the archbishop of Canterbury, had been working with the rebel barons on their demands, and after the suggestion of papal arbitration failed, John instructed Langton to organise peace talks.

==== Great Charter of 1215 ====
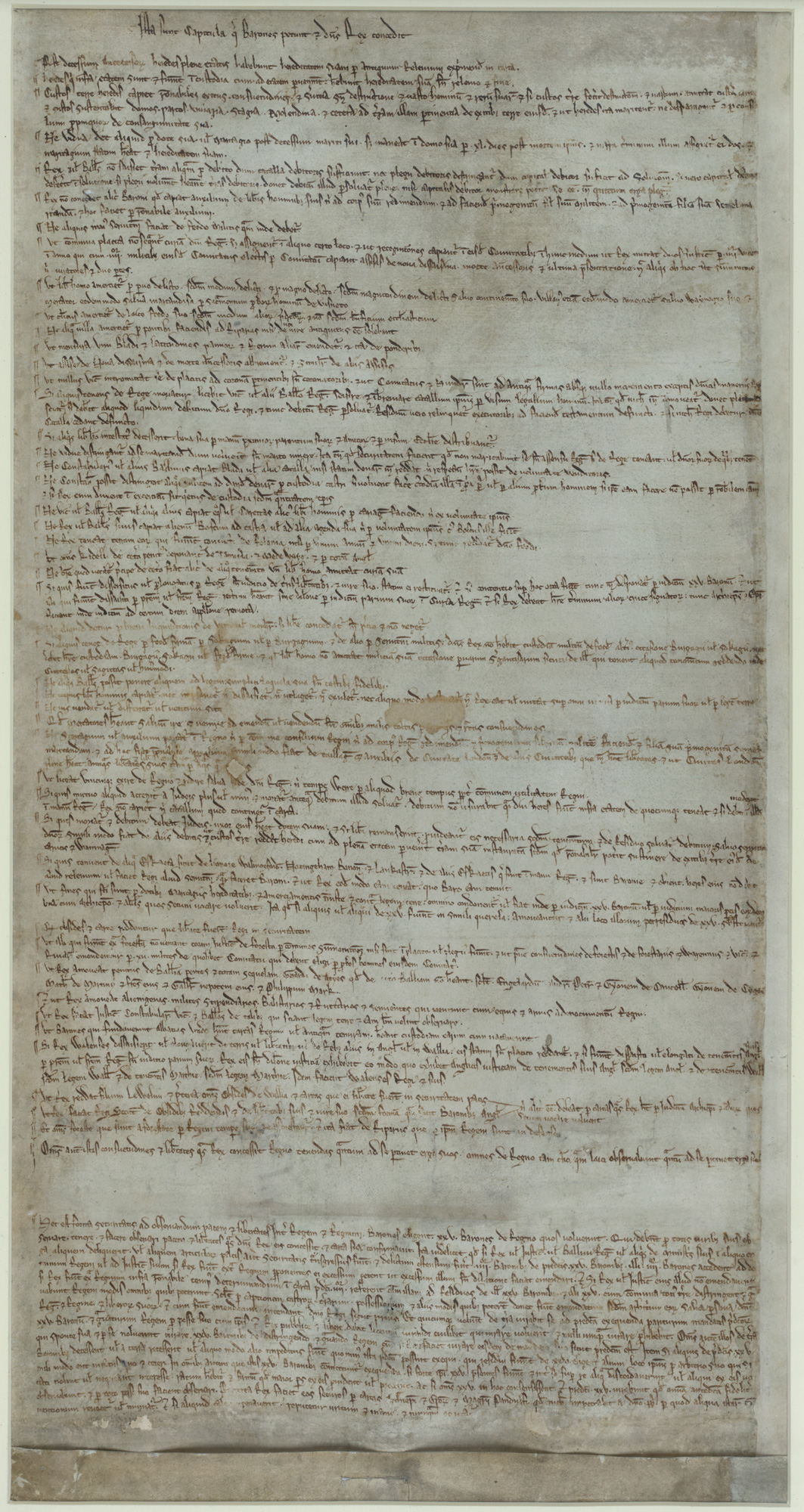
The Articles of the Barons, 1215, held by the British Library

John met the rebel leaders at Runnymede, a water-meadow on the south bank of the River Thames, on 10 June 1215. Runnymede was a traditional place for assemblies, but it was also located on neutral ground between the royal fortress of Windsor Castle and the rebel base at Staines, and offered both sides the security of a rendezvous where they were unlikely to find themselves at a military disadvantage. Here the rebels presented John with their draft demands for reform, the 'Articles of the Barons'. Stephen Langton's pragmatic efforts at mediation over the next ten days turned these incomplete demands into a charter capturing the proposed peace agreement; a few years later, this agreement was renamed Magna Carta, meaning "Great Charter". By 15 June, general agreement had been made on a text, and on 19 June, the rebels renewed their oaths of loyalty to John and copies of the charter were formally issued.

Although, as the historian David Carpenter has noted, the charter "wasted no time on political theory", it went beyond simply addressing individual baronial complaints, and formed a wider proposal for political reform. It promised the protection of church rights, protection from illegal imprisonment, access to swift justice, and, most importantly, limitations on taxation and other feudal payments to the Crown, with certain forms of feudal taxation requiring baronial consent. It focused on the rights of free men—in particular, the barons. The rights of serfs were included in articles 16, 20 and 28. (Note: The Runnymede Charter of Liberties did not apply to Chester, which at the time was a separate feudal domain. Earl Ranulf granted his own Magna Carta of Chester. Some of its articles were similar to the Runnymede Charter.) Its style and content reflected Henry I's Charter of Liberties, as well as a wider body of legal traditions, including the royal charters issued to towns, the operations of the Church and baronial courts and European charters such as the Statute of Pamiers. Magna Carta reflected other legal documents of its time, in England and beyond, which made broadly similar statements of rights and limitations on the powers of the Crown.

Under what historians later labelled "clause 61", or the "security clause", a council of 25 barons would be created to monitor and ensure John's future adherence to the charter. If John did not conform to the charter within 40 days of being notified of a transgression by the council, the 25 barons were empowered by clause 61 to seize John's castles and lands until, in their judgement, amends had been made. Men were to be compelled to swear an oath to assist the council in controlling the King, but once redress had been made for any breaches, the King would continue to rule as before.

In one sense this was not unprecedented. Other kings had previously conceded the right of individual resistance to their subjects if the King did not uphold his obligations. Magna Carta was novel in that it set up a formally recognised means of collectively coercing the King. The historian Wilfred Warren argues that it was almost inevitable that the clause would result in civil war, as it "was crude in its methods and disturbing in its implications". The barons were trying to force John to keep to the charter, but clause 61 was so heavily weighted against the King that this version of the charter could not survive.

John and the rebel barons did not trust each other, and neither side seriously attempted to implement the peace accord. The 25 barons selected for the new council were all rebels, chosen by the more extremist barons, and many among the rebels found excuses to keep their forces mobilised. Disputes began to emerge between the royalist faction and those rebels who had expected the charter to return lands that had been confiscated.

Clause 61 of Magna Carta contained a commitment from John that he would "seek to obtain nothing from anyone, in our own person or through someone else, whereby any of these grants or liberties may be revoked or diminished". Despite this, the King appealed to Pope Innocent for help in July, arguing that the charter compromised the Pope's rights as John's feudal lord. As part of the June peace deal, the barons were supposed to surrender London by 15 August, but this they refused to do. Meanwhile, instructions from the Pope arrived in August, written before the peace accord, with the result that papal commissioners excommunicated the rebel barons and suspended Langton from office in early September.

Once aware of the charter, the Pope responded in detail: in a letter dated 24 August and arriving in late September, he declared the charter to be "not only shameful and demeaning but also illegal and unjust" since John had been "forced to accept" it, and accordingly the charter was "null, and void of all validity for ever"; under threat of excommunication, the King was not to observe the charter, nor the barons try to enforce it.

By then, violence had broken out between the two sides. Less than three months after it had been agreed, John and the loyalist barons firmly repudiated the failed charter: the First Barons' War erupted. The rebel barons concluded that peace with John was impossible, and turned to Philip II's son, the future Louis VIII, for help, offering him the English throne. (Note: Louis's claim to the English throne, described as "debatable" by the historian David Carpenter, derived from his wife, Blanche of Castile, who was the granddaughter of King Henry II of England. Louis argued that since John had been legitimately deposed, the barons could then legally appoint him king over the claims of John's son Henry.) The war soon settled into a stalemate. The King became ill and died on the night of 18 October 1216, leaving the nine-year-old Henry III as his heir.

===== Charters of the Welsh Princes =====
Magna Carta was the first document in which reference is made to English and Welsh law alongside one another, including the principle of the common acceptance of the lawful judgement of peers.

Clause 56: The return of lands and liberties to Welshmen if those lands and liberties had been taken by English (and vice versa) without a law abiding judgement of their peers.

Clause 57: The return of Gruffudd ap Llywelyn ap Iorwerth, illegitimate son of Llywelyn ap Iorwerth (Llywelyn the Great) along with other Welsh hostages which were originally taken for "peace" and "good".

Lists of participants in 1215

====== Counsellors named in Magna Carta ======
The preamble to Magna Carta includes the names of the following 27 ecclesiastical and secular magnates who had counselled John to accept its terms. The names include some of the moderate reformers, notably Archbishop Stephen Langton, and some of John's loyal supporters, such as William Marshal, Earl of Pembroke. They are listed here in the order in which they appear in the charter itself:

- Stephen Langton, Archbishop of Canterbury and Cardinal
- Henry de Loundres, Archbishop of Dublin
- William of Sainte-Mère-Église, Bishop of London
- Peter des Roches, Bishop of Winchester
- Jocelin of Wells, Bishop of Bath and Glastonbury
- Hugh of Wells, Bishop of Lincoln
- Walter de Gray, Bishop of Worcester
- William de Cornhill, Bishop of Coventry
- Benedict of Sausetun, Bishop of Rochester
- Pandulf Verraccio, subdeacon and papal legate to England
- Aimery de Sainte-Maure, Master of the Knights Templar in England
- William Marshal, Earl of Pembroke
- William Longespée, Earl of Salisbury
- William de Warenne, Earl of Surrey
- William d'Aubigny, Earl of Arundel
- Alan of Galloway, Constable of Scotland
- Warin FitzGerold
- Peter FitzHerbert
- Hubert de Burgh, Seneschal of Poitou
- Hugh de Neville
- Matthew FitzHerbert
- Thomas Basset
- Alan Basset
- Philip d'Aubigny
- Robert of Ropsley
- John Marshal
- John FitzHugh

====== The Council of Twenty-Five Barons ======
The names of the Twenty-Five Barons appointed under clause 61 to monitor John's future conduct are not given in the charter itself, but do appear in four early sources, all seemingly based on a contemporary listing: a late-13th-century collection of law tracts and statutes, a Reading Abbey manuscript now in Lambeth Palace Library, and the Chronica Majora and Liber Additamentorum of Matthew Paris. The process of appointment is not known, but the names were drawn almost exclusively from among John's more active opponents. They are listed here in the order in which they appear in the original sources:

- Richard de Clare, Earl of Hertford
- William de Forz, Earl of Albemarle
- Geoffrey de Mandeville, Earl of Essex and Gloucester
- Saer de Quincy, Earl of Winchester
- Henry de Bohun, Earl of Hereford
- Roger Bigod, Earl of Norfolk and Suffolk
- Robert de Vere, Earl of Oxford
- William Marshal junior
- Robert Fitzwalter, baron of Little Dunmow
- Gilbert de Clare, heir to the earldom of Hertford
- Eustace de Vesci, Lord of Alnwick Castle
- Hugh Bigod, heir to the Earldoms of Norfolk and Suffolk
- William de Mowbray, Lord of Axholme Castle
- William Hardell, Mayor of the City of London
- William de Lanvallei, Lord of Walkern
- Robert de Ros, Baron of Helmsley
- John de Lacy, Constable of Chester and Lord of Pontefract Castle
- Richard de Percy
- John FitzRobert de Clavering, Lord of Warkworth Castle
- William Malet
- Geoffrey de Saye
- Roger de Montbegon, Lord of Hornby Castle, Lancashire (Note: Roger de Montbegon is named in only one of the four early sources (BL, Harley MS 746, fol. 64); whereas the others name Roger de Mowbray. However, Holt believes the Harley listing to be "the best", and the de Mowbray entries to be an error.)
- William of Huntingfield, Sheriff of Norfolk and Suffolk
- Richard de Montfichet
- William d'Aubigny, Lord of Belvoir

====== Excommunicated rebels ======
In September 1215, the papal commissioners in England—Subdeacon Pandulf, Peter des Roches, Bishop of Winchester, and Simon, Abbot of Reading—excommunicated the rebels, acting on instructions earlier received from Rome. A letter sent by the commissioners from Dover on 5 September to Archbishop Langton explicitly names nine senior rebel barons (all members of the Council of Twenty-Five), and six clerics numbered among the rebel ranks:

Barons

- Robert Fitzwalter
- Saer de Quincy, Earl of Winchester
- Richard de Clare, Earl of Hertford
- Geoffrey de Mandeville, Earl of Essex and Gloucester
- Eustace de Vesci
- Richard de Percy
- John de Lacy, Constable of Chester
- William d'Aubigny
- William de Mowbray

Clerics

- Giles de Braose, Bishop of Hereford
- William, Archdeacon of Hereford
- Alexander the clerk (possibly Alexander of St Albans)
- Osbert de Samara
- John de Fereby
- Robert, chaplain to Robert Fitzwalter

==== Great Charter of 1216 ====
Although the Charter of 1215 was a failure as a peace treaty, it was resurrected under the new government of the young Henry III as a way of drawing support away from the rebel faction. On his deathbed, King John appointed a council of thirteen executors to help Henry reclaim the kingdom, and requested that his son be placed into the guardianship of William Marshal, one of the most famous knights in England. William knighted the boy, and Cardinal Guala Bicchieri, the papal legate to England, then oversaw his coronation at Gloucester Cathedral on 28 October.

The young King inherited a difficult situation, with over half of England occupied by the rebels. He had substantial support though from Guala, who intended to win the civil war for Henry and punish the rebels. Guala set about strengthening the ties between England and the Papacy, starting with the coronation itself, during which Henry gave homage to the Papacy, recognising the Pope as his feudal lord. Pope Honorius III declared that Henry was the Pope's vassal and ward, and that the legate had complete authority to protect Henry and his kingdom. As an additional measure, Henry took the cross, declaring himself a crusader and thereby entitled to special protection from Rome.

The war was not going well for the loyalists, but Prince Louis and the rebel barons were also finding it difficult to make further progress. John's death had defused some of the rebel concerns, and the royal castles were still holding out in the occupied parts of the country. Henry's government encouraged the rebel barons to come back to his cause in exchange for the return of their lands, and reissued a version of the 1215 Charter, albeit having first removed some of the clauses, including those unfavourable to the Papacy and clause 61, which had set up the council of barons. The move was not successful, and opposition to Henry's new government hardened.

==== Great Charter of 1217 ====
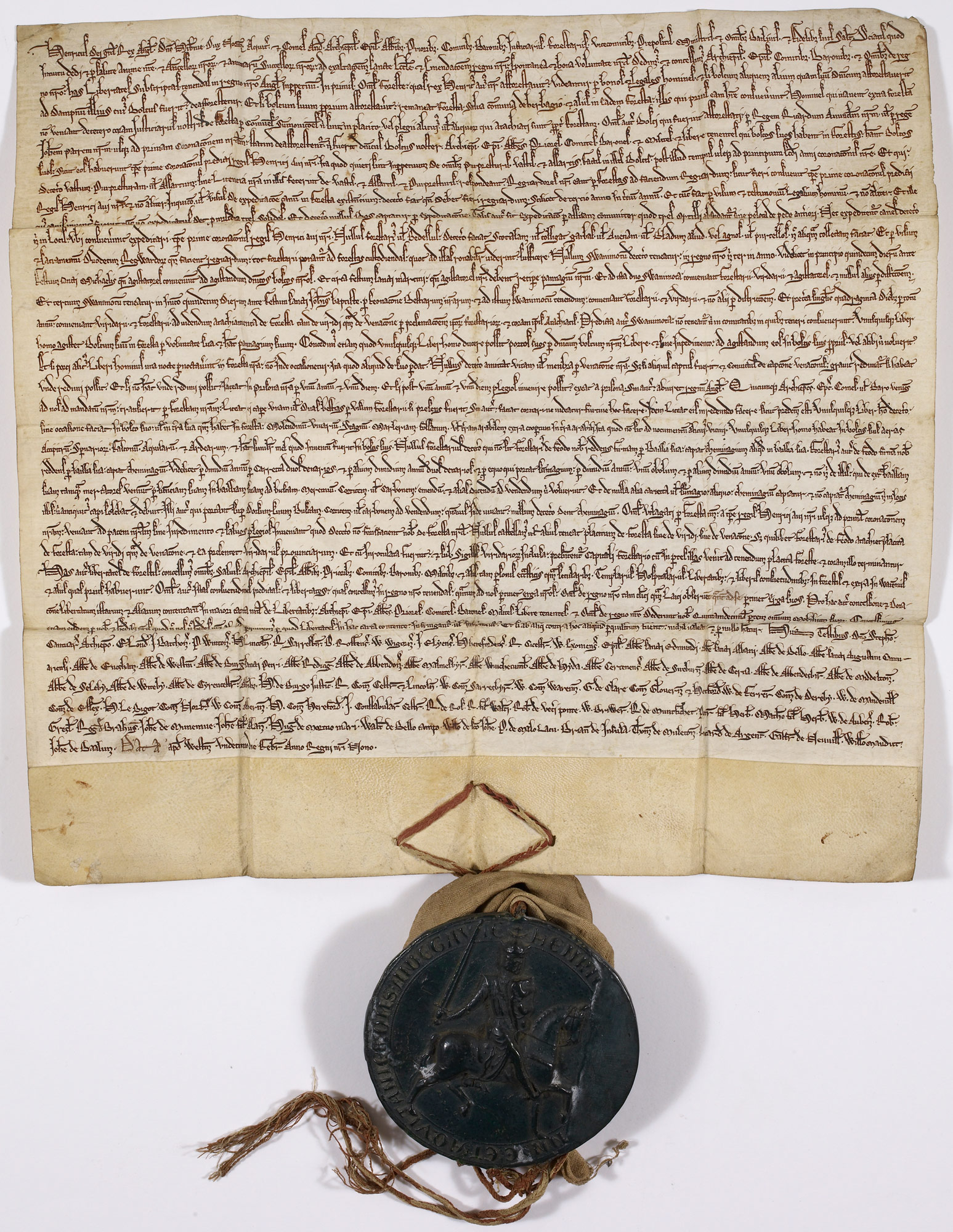
The Charter of the Forest re-issued in 1225, held by the British Library

In February 1217, Louis set sail for France to gather reinforcements. In his absence, arguments broke out between Louis' French and English followers, and Cardinal Guala declared that Henry's war against the rebels was the equivalent of a religious crusade. This declaration resulted in a series of defections from the rebel movement, and the tide of the conflict swung in Henry's favour. Louis returned at the end of April, but his northern forces were defeated by William Marshal at the Battle of Lincoln in May.

Meanwhile, support for Louis' campaign was diminishing in France, and he concluded that the war in England was lost. He negotiated terms with Cardinal Guala, under which Louis would renounce his claim to the English throne. In return, his followers would be given back their lands, any sentences of excommunication would be lifted, and Henry's government would promise to enforce the charter of the previous year. The proposed agreement soon began to unravel amid claims from some loyalists that it was too generous towards the rebels, particularly the clergy who had joined the rebellion.

In the absence of a settlement, Louis stayed in London with his remaining forces, hoping for the arrival of reinforcements from France. When the expected fleet arrived in August, it was intercepted and defeated by loyalists at the Battle of Sandwich. Louis entered into fresh peace negotiations. The factions came to agreement on the final Treaty of Lambeth, also known as the Treaty of Kingston, on 12 and 13 September 1217.

The treaty was similar to the first peace offer, but excluded the rebel clergy, whose lands and appointments remained forfeit. It included a promise that Louis' followers would be allowed to enjoy their traditional liberties and customs, referring back to the Charter of 1216. Louis left England as agreed. He joined the Albigensian Crusade in the south of France, bringing the war to an end.

A great council was called in October and November to take stock of the post-war situation. This council is thought to have formulated and issued the Charter of 1217. The charter resembled that of 1216, although some additional clauses were added to protect the rights of the barons over their feudal subjects, and the restrictions on the Crown's ability to levy taxation were watered down. There remained a range of disagreements about the management of the royal forests, which involved a special legal system that had resulted in a source of considerable royal revenue. Complaints existed over both the implementation of these courts, and the geographic boundaries of the royal forests.

A complementary charter, the Charter of the Forest, was created, pardoning existing forest offences, imposing new controls over the forest courts, and establishing a review of the forest boundaries. To distinguish the two charters, the term 'magna carta libertatum' ("the great charter of liberties") was used by the scribes to refer to the larger document, which in time became known simply as Magna Carta.

==== Great Charter of 1225 ====
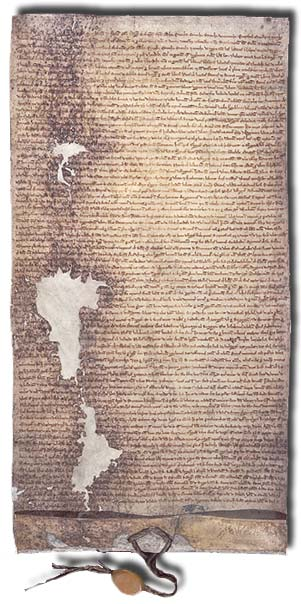
1225 version of Magna Carta issued by Henry III, held in the National Archives

Magna Carta became increasingly embedded into English political life during Henry III's minority. As the King grew older, his government slowly began to recover from the civil war, regaining control of the counties and beginning to raise revenue once again, taking care not to overstep the terms of the charters. Henry remained a minor and his government's legal ability to make permanently binding decisions on his behalf was limited. In 1223, the tensions over the status of the charters became clear in the royal court, when Henry's government attempted to reassert its rights over its properties and revenues in the counties, facing resistance from many communities that argued—if sometimes incorrectly—that the charters protected the new arrangements.

This resistance resulted in an argument between Archbishop Langton and William Brewer over whether the King had any duty to fulfil the terms of the charters, given that he had been forced to agree to them. On this occasion, Henry gave oral assurances that he considered himself bound by the charters, enabling a royal inquiry into the situation in the counties to progress.

In 1225, the question of Henry's commitment to the charters re-emerged, when Louis VIII of France invaded Henry's remaining provinces in France, Poitou and Gascony. Henry's army in Poitou was under-resourced, and the province quickly fell. It became clear that Gascony would also fall unless reinforcements were sent from England. In early 1225, a great council approved a tax of £40,000 to dispatch an army, which quickly retook Gascony. In exchange for agreeing to support Henry, the barons demanded that the King reissue Magna Carta and the Charter of the Forest. The content was almost identical to the 1217 versions, but in the new versions, the King declared that the charters were issued of his own "spontaneous and free will" and confirmed them with the royal seal, giving the new Great Charter and the Charter of the Forest of 1225 much more authority than the previous versions.

The barons anticipated that the King would act in accordance with these charters, subject to the law and moderated by the advice of the nobility. Uncertainty continued, and in 1227, when he was declared of age and able to rule independently, Henry announced that future charters had to be issued under his own seal. This brought into question the validity of the previous charters issued during his minority, and Henry actively threatened to overturn the Charter of the Forest unless the taxes promised in return for it were actually paid. In 1253, Henry confirmed the charters once again in exchange for taxation.

Henry placed a symbolic emphasis on rebuilding royal authority, but his rule was relatively circumscribed by Magna Carta. He generally acted within the terms of the charters, which prevented the Crown from taking extrajudicial action against the barons, including the fines and expropriations that had been common under his father, John. The charters did not address the sensitive issues of the appointment of royal advisers and the distribution of patronage, and they lacked any means of enforcement if the King chose to ignore them. The inconsistency with which he applied the charters over the course of his rule alienated many barons, even those within his own faction.

Despite the various charters, the provision of royal justice was inconsistent and driven by the needs of immediate politics: sometimes action would be taken to address a legitimate baronial complaint, while on other occasions the problem would simply be ignored. The royal courts, which toured the country to provide justice at the local level, typically for lesser barons and the gentry claiming grievances against major lords, had little power, allowing the major barons to dominate the local justice system. Henry's rule became lax and careless, resulting in a reduction in royal authority in the provinces and, ultimately, the collapse of his authority at court.

In 1258, a group of barons seized power from Henry in a coup d'état, citing the need to strictly enforce Magna Carta and the Charter of the Forest, creating a new baronial-led government to advance reform through the Provisions of Oxford. The barons were not militarily powerful enough to win a decisive victory, and instead appealed to Louis IX of France in 1263–1264 to arbitrate on their proposed reforms. The reformist barons argued their case based on Magna Carta, suggesting that it was inviolable under English law and that the King had broken its terms.

Louis came down firmly in favour of Henry, but the French arbitration failed to achieve peace as the rebellious barons refused to accept the verdict. England slipped back into the Second Barons' War, which was won by Henry's son, the Lord Edward. Edward also invoked Magna Carta in advancing his cause, arguing that the reformers had taken matters too far and were themselves acting against Magna Carta. In a conciliatory gesture after the barons had been defeated, in 1267 Henry issued the Statute of Marlborough, which included a fresh commitment to observe the terms of Magna Carta.

===== Witnesses in 1225 =====
Witnesses to the 1225 charter

The following 65 individuals were witnesses to the 1225 issue of Magna Carta, named in the order in which they appear in the charter itself:

- Stephen Langton, Archbishop of Canterbury and Cardinal
- Eustace of Fauconberg, Bishop of London
- Jocelin of Wells, Bishop of Bath
- Peter des Roches, Bishop of Winchester
- Hugh of Wells, Bishop of Lincoln
- Richard Poore, Bishop of Salisbury
- Benedict of Sausetun, Bishop of Rochester
- William de Blois, Bishop of Worcester
- John of Fountains, Bishop of Ely
- Hugh Foliot, Bishop of Hereford
- Ralph Neville, Bishop of Chichester
- William Briwere, Bishop of Exeter
- William of Trumpington, Abbot of St Albans
- Hugh of Northwold, Abbot of Bury St Edmunds
- Richard, Abbot of Battle
- the Abbot of St Augustine's, Canterbury
- Randulf of Evesham, Abbot of Evesham
- Richard of Barking, Abbot of Westminster
- Alexander of Holderness, Abbot of Peterborough
- Simon, Abbot of Reading
- Robert of Hendred, Abbot of Abingdon
- John Walsh, Abbot of Malmesbury
- the Abbot of Winchcombe
- the Abbot of Hyde
- the Abbot of Chertsey
- the Abbot of Sherborne
- the Abbot of Cerne
- the Abbot of Abbotsbury
- the Abbot of Milton
- the Abbot of Selby
- the Abbot of Whitby
- the Abbot of Cirencester
- Hubert de Burgh, Justiciar of England and Ireland
- Ranulf, Earl of Chester and Lincoln
- William Longespée, Earl of Salisbury
- William de Warenne, Earl of Surrey
- Gilbert de Clare, Earl of Gloucester and Hertford
- William de Ferrers, Earl of Derby
- William de Mandeville, Earl of Essex
- Hugh Bigod, Earl of Norfolk
- William de Forz, Earl of Albemarle
- Humphrey de Bohun, Earl of Hereford
- John de Lacy, Constable of Chester
- Robert de Ros
- Robert Fitzwalter
- Robert de Vieuxpont
- William Brewer
- Richard de Montfichet
- Peter FitzHerbert
- Matthew FitzHerbert
- William d'Aubigny
- Robert Gresley
- Reginald de Braose
- John of Monmouth
- John FitzAlan
- Hugh de Mortimer
- William de Beauchamp
- William de St John
- Peter de Maulay
- Brian de Lisle
- Thomas of Moulton
- Richard de Argentan
- Geoffrey de Neville
- William de Maudit
- John de Baalun

==== Great Charter of 1297 ====
Magna Carta (1297)
- Act of Parliament
- Parliament of England
- Citation: 25 Edw. 1
- Territorial extent: England and Wales; Ireland

Dates
- Royal assent: 1297
Other legislation
Amended by	Continuance, etc. of Laws Act 1623; Criminal Statutes Repeal Act 1827; Offences Against the Person Act 1828; Criminal Law (India) Act 1828; Offences Against the Person (Ireland) Act 1829; Statute Law Revision Act 1863; Statute Law Revision (Ireland) Act 1872; Civil Procedure Acts Repeal Act 1879; Sheriffs Act 1887; Statute Law Revision Act 1887; Statute Law Revision Act 1892; Statute Law Revision Act 1894; Administration of Estates Act 1925; Crown Proceedings Act 1947; Statute Law Revision Act 1948; Northern Ireland (Crown Proceedings) Order 1949; Administration of Estates Act (Northern Ireland) 1955; Criminal Law Act 1967; Criminal Law Act (Northern Ireland) 1967; Statute Law (Repeals) Act 1969
Relates to	Charter of the Forest, Confirmation of the Charters (1297), A Statute Concerning Tallage (1297)

Status: Amended

Text of statute as originally enacted

Text of the Magna Carta (1297) as in force today (including any amendments) within the United Kingdom, from legislation.gov.uk.

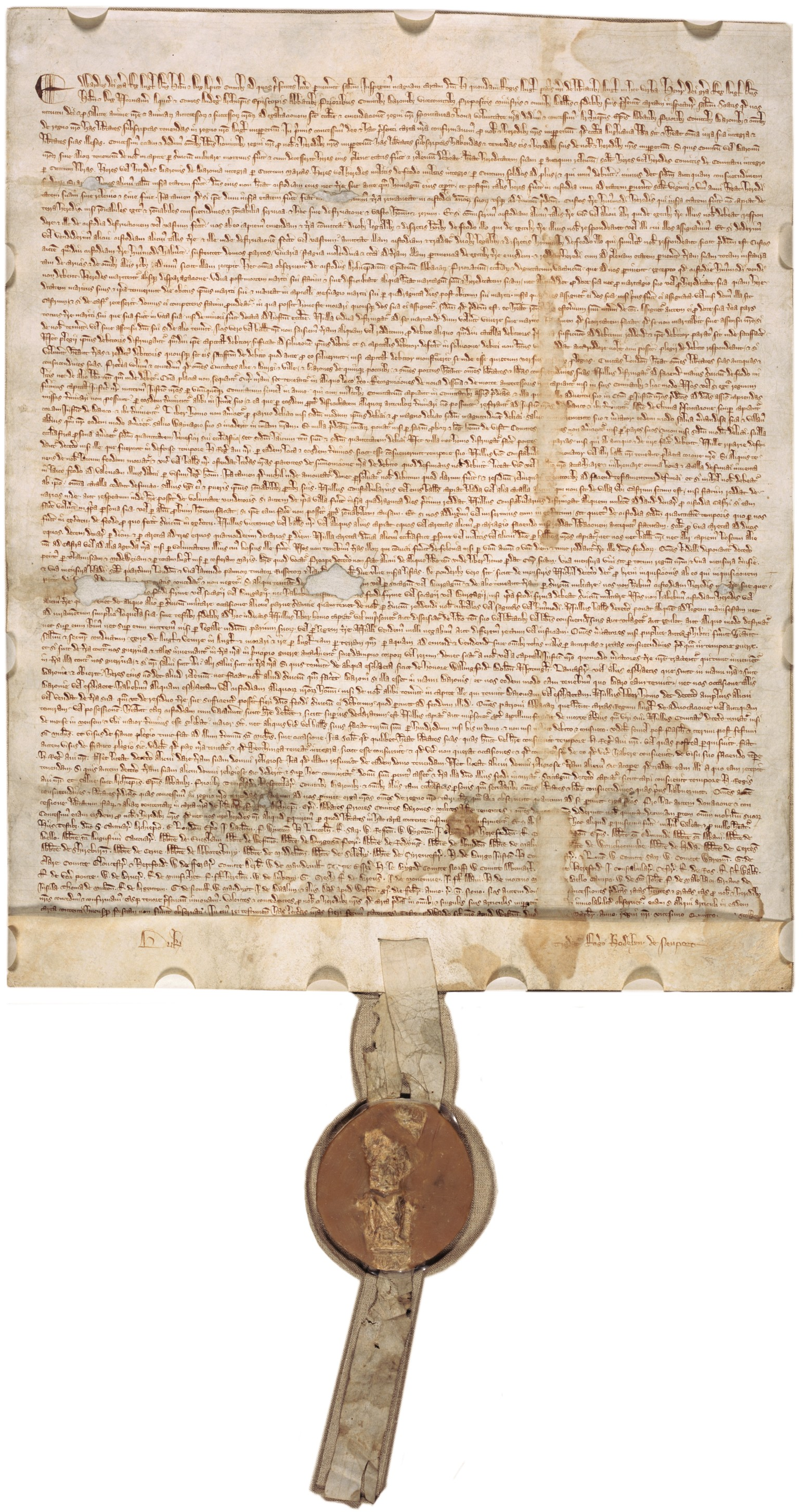
1297 version of the Great Charter, on display in the National Archives Building in Washington, D.C.

King Edward I reissued the Charters of 1225 in 1297 in return for a new tax. It is this version which remains on the statute book today, although with most articles now repealed.

Confirmation of the Charters (1297)
- Act of Parliament
- Parliament of England
- Citation: 25 Edw. 1
- Territorial extent: England and Wales; Ireland

Dates
- Royal assent: 1297
Other legislation
Amended by	Statute Law Revision Act 1887; Statute Law Revision Act 1948; Statute Law (Repeals) Act 1969; Wild Creatures and Forest Laws Act 1971
Relates to	Magna Carta (1297); Charter of the Forest; A Statute Concerning Tallage (1297)

Status: Amended

Text of statute as originally enacted

Text of the Confirmation of the Charters (1297) as in force today (including any amendments) within the United Kingdom, from legislation.gov.uk.

The Confirmatio Cartarum (Confirmation of Charters) was issued in Norman French by Edward I in 1297. Edward, needing money, had taxed the nobility, and they had armed themselves against him, forcing Edward to issue his confirmation of Magna Carta and the Forest Charter to avoid civil war. The nobles had sought to add another document, the De Tallagio, to Magna Carta. Edward I's government was not prepared to concede this, they agreed to the issuing of the Confirmatio, confirming the previous charters and confirming the principle that taxation should be by consent, although the precise manner of that consent was not laid down.

A passage mandates that copies shall be distributed in "cathedral churches throughout our realm, there to remain, and shall be read before the people two times by the year", hence the permanent installation of a copy in Salisbury Cathedral. In the Confirmation's second article, it is confirmed that:

...if any judgement be given from henceforth contrary to the points of the charters aforesaid by the justices, or by any other our ministers that hold plea before them against the points of the charters, it shall be undone, and holden for nought.

==== Great Charter of 1300 ====
With the reconfirmation of the charters in 1300, an additional document was granted, the Articuli super Cartas (The Articles upon the Charters). It was composed of 17 articles and sought in part to deal with the problem of enforcing the charters. Magna Carta and the Forest Charter were to be issued to the sheriff of each county, and should be read four times a year at the meetings of the county courts. Each county should have a committee of three men who could hear complaints about violations of the Charters.

Pope Clement V continued the papal policy of supporting monarchs (who ruled by divine grace) against any claims in Magna Carta which challenged the King's rights, and annulled the Confirmatio Cartarum in 1305. Edward I interpreted Clement V's papal bull annulling the Confirmatio Cartarum as effectively applying to the Articuli super Cartas, although the latter was not specifically mentioned. In 1306 Edward I took the opportunity given by the Pope's backing to reassert forest law over large areas which had been "disafforested". Both Edward and the Pope were accused by some contemporary chroniclers of "perjury", and it was suggested by Robert McNair Scott that Robert the Bruce refused to make peace with Edward I's son, Edward II, in 1312 with the justification: "How shall the king of England keep faith with me, since he does not observe the sworn promises made to his liege men ...".

==== Magna Carta's influence on English medieval law ====
The Great Charter was referred to in legal cases throughout the medieval period. For example, in 1226, the knights of Lincolnshire argued that their local sheriff was changing customary practice regarding the local courts, "contrary to their liberty which they ought to have by the charter of the lord king". In practice, cases were not brought against the King for breach of Magna Carta and the Forest Charter, but it was possible to bring a case against the King's officers, such as his sheriffs, using the argument that the King's officers were acting contrary to liberties granted by the King in the charters.

In addition, medieval cases referred to the clauses in Magna Carta which dealt with specific issues such as wardship and dower, debt collection, and keeping rivers free for navigation. Even in the 13th century, some clauses of Magna Carta rarely appeared in legal cases, either because the issues concerned were no longer relevant, or because Magna Carta had been superseded by more relevant legislation. By 1350 half the clauses of Magna Carta were no longer actively used.

=== 14th–15th centuries ===
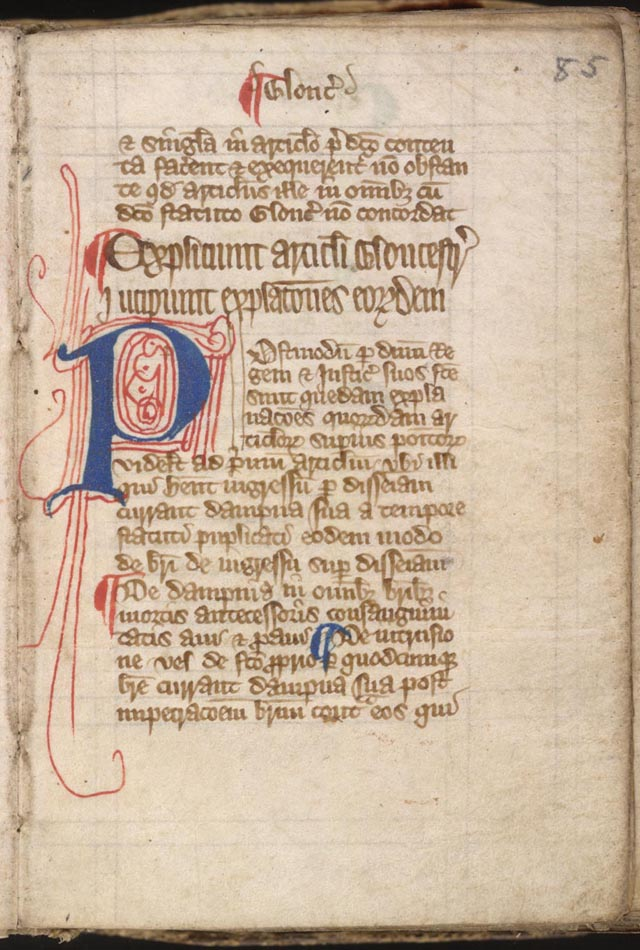
Magna carta cum statutis angliae ("Great Charter with English Statutes"), early 14th century

During the reign of King Edward III six measures, later known as the Six Statutes, were passed between 1331 and 1369. They sought to clarify certain parts of the Charters. In particular the third statute, in 1354, redefined clause 29, with "free man" becoming "no man, of whatever estate or condition he may be", and introduced the phrase "due process of law" for "lawful judgement of his peers or the law of the land".

Between the 13th and 15th centuries Magna Carta was reconfirmed 32 times according to Sir Edward Coke, and possibly as many as 45 times. Often the first item of parliamentary business was a public reading and reaffirmation of the Charter, and, as in the previous century, parliaments often exacted confirmation of it from the monarch. The Charter was confirmed in 1423 by King Henry VI.

By the mid-15th century, Magna Carta ceased to occupy a central role in English political life, as monarchs reasserted authority and powers which had been challenged in the 100 years after Edward I's reign. The Great Charter remained a text for lawyers, particularly as a protector of property rights, and became more widely read than ever as printed versions circulated and levels of literacy increased.

=== 16th century ===
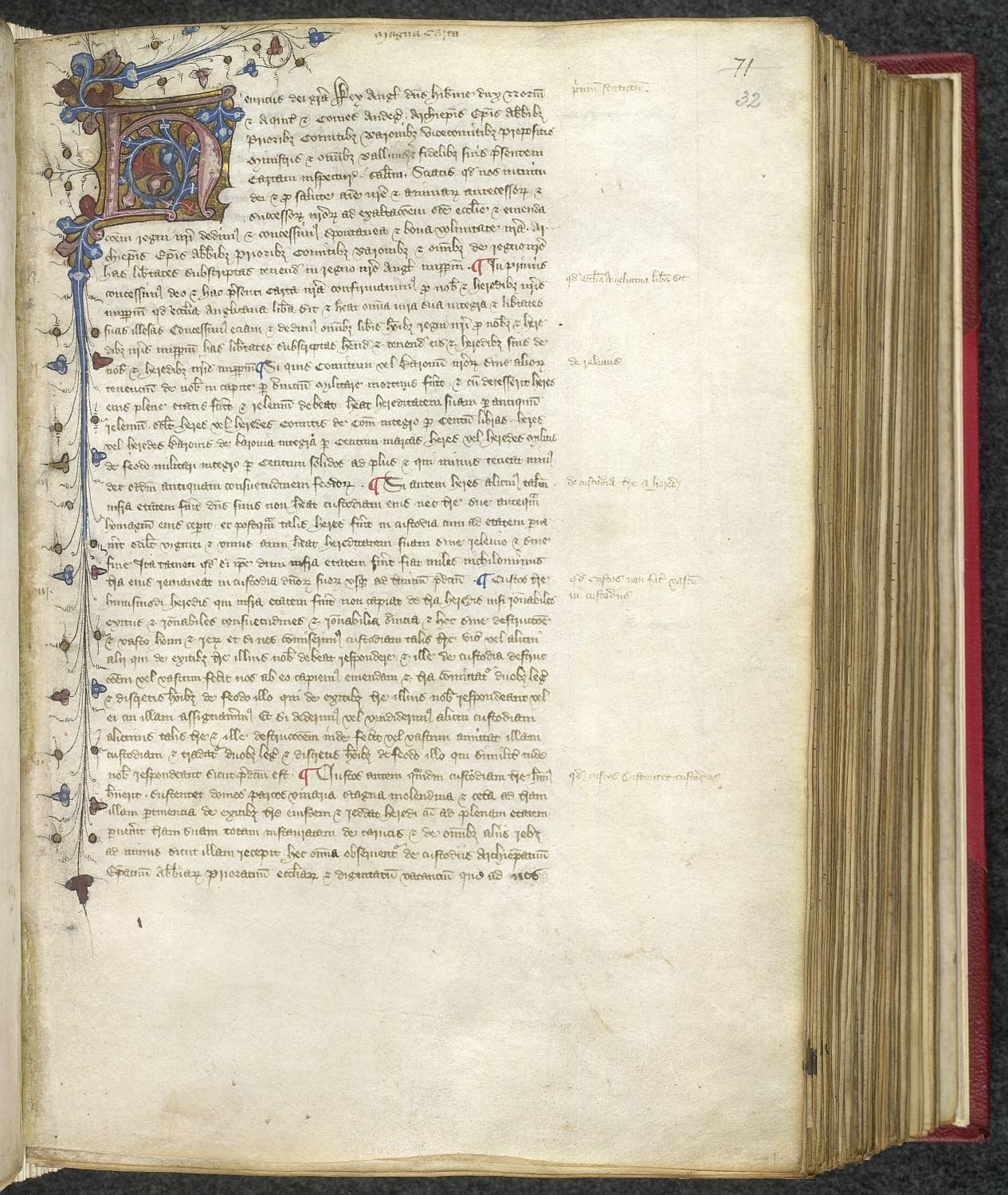
A version of the Charter of 1217, produced between 1437 and c. 1450

During the 16th century, the interpretation of Magna Carta and the First Barons' War shifted. Henry VII took power at the end of the turbulent Wars of the Roses, followed by Henry VIII, and extensive propaganda under both rulers promoted the legitimacy of the regime, the illegitimacy of any sort of rebellion against royal power, and the priority of supporting the Crown in its arguments with the Papacy.

Tudor historians rediscovered the Barnwell chronicler, who was more favourable to King John than other 13th-century texts, and, as historian Ralph Turner describes, they "viewed King John in a positive light as a hero struggling against the papacy", showing "little sympathy for the Great Charter or the rebel barons". Pro-Catholic demonstrations during the 1536 uprising cited Magna Carta, accusing the King of not giving it sufficient respect.

The first mechanically printed edition of Magna Carta was probably the Magna Carta cum aliis Antiquis Statutis of 1508 by Richard Pynson, although the early printed versions of the 16th century incorrectly attributed the origins of Magna Carta to Henry III and 1225, rather than to John and 1215, and accordingly worked from the later text. An abridged English-language edition was published by John Rastell in 1527. Thomas Berthelet, Pynson's successor as the royal printer during 1530–1547, printed an edition of the text along with other "ancient statutes" in 1531 and 1540.

In 1534, George Ferrers published the first unabridged English-language edition of Magna Carta, dividing the Charter into 37 numbered clauses.

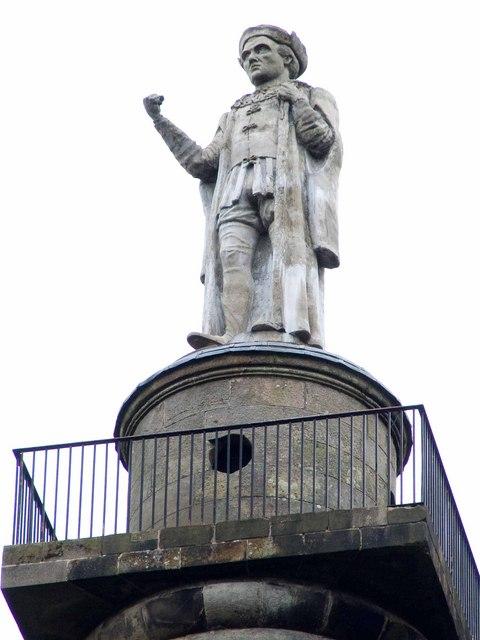
Statue of Sir Rowland Hill (d.1561) on his monument in Hawkstone Park, Shropshire, based on his tomb monument in London: he holds a rolled copy of Magna Carta in his right hand

The tomb monument of Sir Rowland Hill (d. 1561) of Soulton, Shropshire, in the church of St Stephen Walbrook, London, included a standing effigy of the statesman and judge holding a copy of Magna Carta. Hill was a Mercer and a Lord Mayor of London; both of these statuses were shared with Serlo the Mercer who was a negotiator and enforcer of Magna Carta. The original monument was lost in the Great Fire of London, but the statue was replicated in 1795 on a 110-foot tall column on his family's estates in Shropshire, and replaced (following storm damage in the 1930s) by a modern replica in 1992.

At the end of the 16th century, there was an upsurge in antiquarian interest in Magna Carta in England. Legal historians concluded that there was a set of ancient English customs and laws which had been temporarily overthrown by the Norman invasion of 1066, and been recovered in 1215 and recorded in Magna Carta, which in turn gave authority to important 16th-century legal principles. Modern historians regard this narrative as fundamentally incorrect, and many refer to it as a "myth". (Note: Among the historians to have discussed the "myth" of Magna Carta and the ancient English constitution are Claire Breay, Geoffrey Hindley, James Holt, John Pocock, Danny Danziger, and John Gillingham.)

The antiquarian William Lambarde published what he believed were the Anglo-Saxon and Norman law codes, tracing the origins of the 16th-century English Parliament back to this period, but he misinterpreted the dates of many documents concerned. Francis Bacon argued that clause 39 of Magna Carta was the basis of the 16th-century jury system and judicial processes. Antiquarians Robert Beale, James Morice and Richard Cosin argued that Magna Carta was a statement of liberty and a fundamental, supreme law empowering English government. Those who questioned these conclusions, including the Member of Parliament Arthur Hall, faced sanctions.

=== 17th–18th centuries ===
==== Political tensions ====
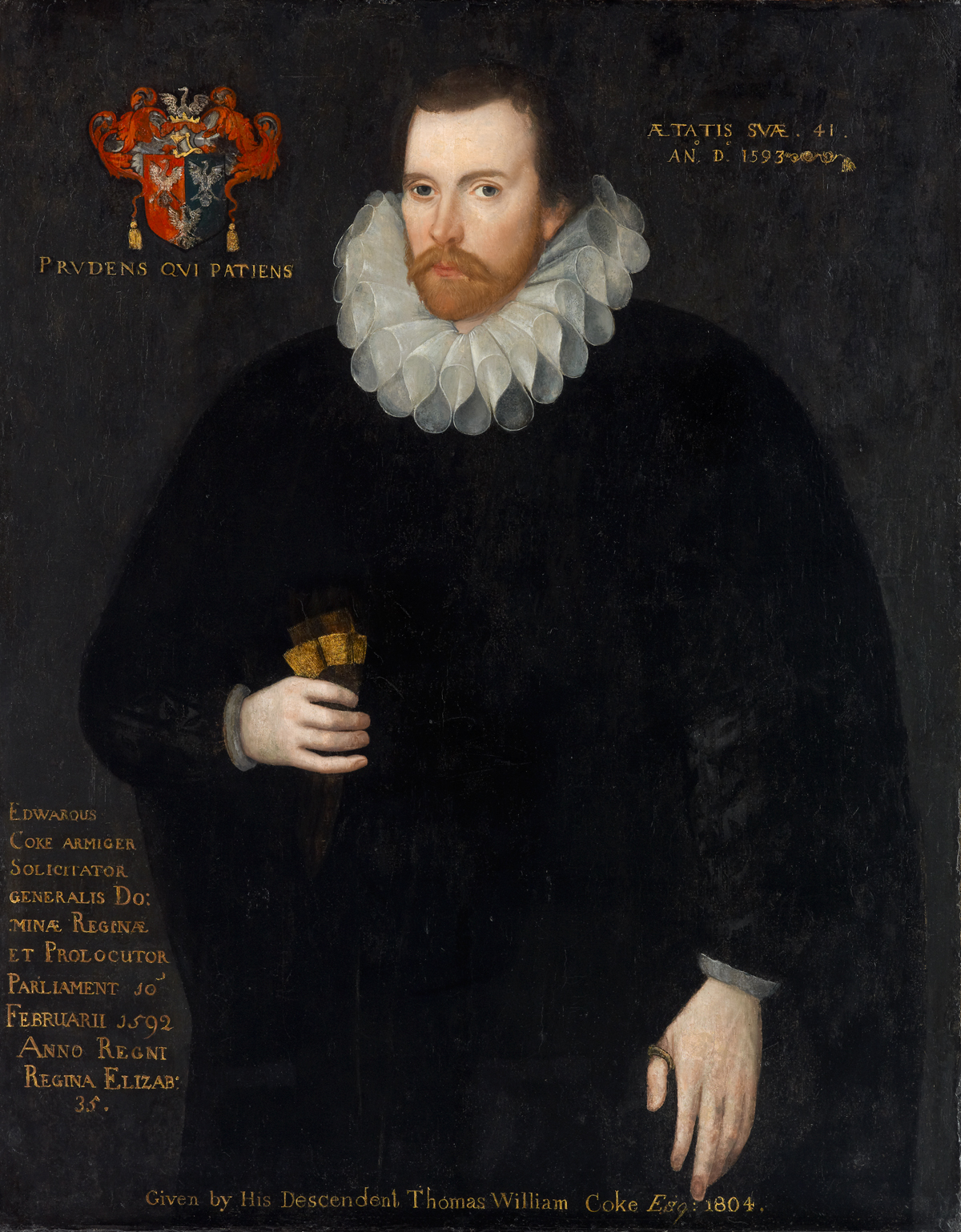
The jurist Edward Coke made extensive political use of Magna Carta.

With the accession of James VI of Scotland of the House of Stuart to the English throne in 1603, when Elizabeth I of England died childless ending the Tudor dynasty, he became James of England, ruling each kingdom separately in a composite monarchy. There were separate parliaments in each kingdom and separate legal traditions. James believed in the divine right of kings and had ruled Scotland without limits on his power. In England under the Stuart kings, Magna Carta became increasingly important as a political document in arguments over the authority of the English monarchy. James I and Charles I both propounded greater authority for the Crown, justified by the doctrine of the divine right of kings, and Magna Carta was cited extensively by their opponents to challenge the monarchy.

Magna Carta, it was argued, recognised and protected the liberty of individual Englishmen, made the King subject to the common law of the land, formed the origin of the trial by jury system, and acknowledged the ancient origins of Parliament: because of Magna Carta and this ancient constitution, an English monarch was unable to alter these long-standing English customs. Although the arguments based on Magna Carta were historically inaccurate, they nonetheless carried symbolic power, as the charter had immense significance during this period; antiquarians such as Sir Henry Spelman described it as "the most majestic and a sacrosanct anchor to English Liberties".

Sir Edward Coke was a leader in using Magna Carta as a political tool during this period. Still working from the 1225 version of the text – the first printed copy of the 1215 charter only emerged in 1610 – Coke spoke and wrote about Magna Carta repeatedly. His work was challenged at the time by Lord Ellesmere, and modern historians such as Ralph Turner and Claire Breay have critiqued Coke as "misconstruing" the original charter "anachronistically and uncritically", and taking a "very selective" approach to his analysis. More sympathetically, J. C. Holt noted that the history of the charters had already become "distorted" by the time Coke was carrying out his work.

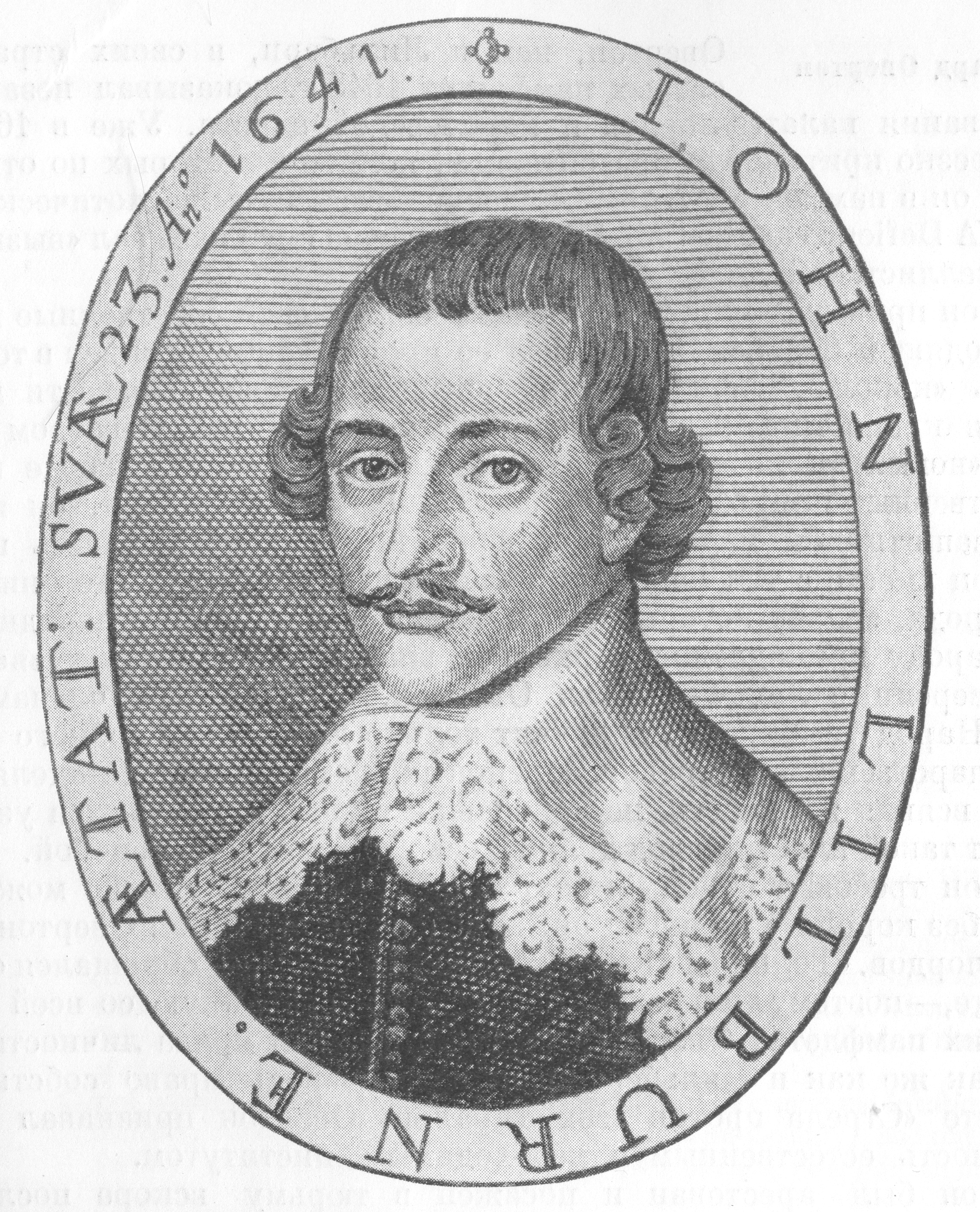
The Leveller John Lilburne criticised Magna Carta as an inadequate definition of English liberties.

In 1621, a bill was presented to Parliament to renew Magna Carta; although this bill failed, lawyer John Selden argued during Darnell's Case in 1627 that the right of habeas corpus was backed by Magna Carta. Coke supported the Petition of Right in 1628, which cited Magna Carta in its preamble, attempting to extend the provisions, and to make them binding on the judiciary. The monarchy responded by arguing that the historical legal situation was much less clear-cut than was being claimed, restricted the activities of antiquarians, arrested Coke for treason, and suppressed his proposed book on Magna Carta. Charles initially did not agree to the Petition of Right, and refused to confirm Magna Carta in any way that would reduce his independence as King.

England descended into civil war in the 1640s, resulting in Charles I's execution in 1649. Under the republic that followed, some questioned whether Magna Carta, an agreement with a monarch, was still relevant. An anti-Cromwellian pamphlet published in 1660, The English devil, said that the nation had been "compelled to submit to this Tyrant Nol or be cut off by him; nothing but a word and a blow, his Will was his Law; tell him of Magna Carta, he would lay his hand on his sword and cry Magna Farta". In a 2005 speech the Lord Chief Justice of England and Wales, Lord Woolf, repeated the claim that Cromwell had referred to Magna Carta as "Magna Farta".

The radical groups that flourished during this period held differing opinions of Magna Carta. The Levellers rejected history and law as presented by their contemporaries, holding instead to an "anti-Normanism" viewpoint. John Lilburne, for example, argued that Magna Carta contained only some of the freedoms that had supposedly existed under the Anglo-Saxons before being crushed by the Norman yoke. The Leveller Richard Overton described the charter as "a beggarly thing containing many marks of intolerable bondage".

Both saw Magna Carta as a useful declaration of liberties that could be used against governments they disagreed with. Gerrard Winstanley, the leader of the more extreme Diggers, stated "the best lawes that England hath, [viz., Magna Carta] were got by our Forefathers importunate petitioning unto the kings that still were their Task-masters; and yet these best laws are yoaks and manicles, tying one sort of people to be slaves to another; Clergy and Gentry have got their freedom, but the common people still are, and have been left servants to work for them."

==== Glorious Revolution ====
The first attempt at a proper historiography was undertaken by Robert Brady, who refuted the supposed antiquity of Parliament and belief in the immutable continuity of the law. Brady contended that the liberties of the Charter were limited and argued that the liberties were the grant of the monarch. By putting Magna Carta in historical context, he cast doubt on its contemporary political relevance. Brady's historical interpretation did not survive the Glorious Revolution, which ousted the Stuart monarch James II. According to the historian J. G. A. Pocock, that "marked a setback for the course of English historiography."

In the Whig interpretation of history, the Glorious Revolution was an example of reclaiming ancient liberties. Reinforced with Lockean concepts, the Whigs believed England's constitution to be a social contract, based on documents such as Magna Carta, the Petition of Right, and the Bill of Rights. The English Liberties (1680, in later versions often British Liberties) by the Whig writer Henry Care (d. 1688) was a polemical and influential work that was much-reprinted, in the American colonies as well as Britain. It placed Magna Carta central to the history and the contemporary legitimacy of its subject.

Ideas about the nature of law in general were beginning to change. In 1716, the Septennial Act 1715 was passed, which had a number of consequences. First, it showed that Parliament no longer considered its previous statutes unassailable, as it provided for a maximum parliamentary term of seven years, whereas the Triennial Act 1694 (enacted less than a quarter of a century previously) had provided for a maximum term of three years. It also greatly extended the powers of Parliament. Under this new constitution, monarchical absolutism was replaced by parliamentary supremacy. It was quickly realised that Magna Carta stood in the same relation to the King-in-Parliament as it had to the King without Parliament. This supremacy was challenged by Granville Sharp, who regarded Magna Carta as a fundamental part of the constitution, and maintained that it would be treason to repeal any part of it. He also held that the Charter prohibited slavery.

Sir William Blackstone published a critical edition of the 1215 Charter in 1759, and gave it the numbering system still used today. In 1763, Member of Parliament John Wilkes was arrested for writing an inflammatory pamphlet, No. 45, 23 April 1763, citing Magna Carta throughout. Lord Camden denounced the treatment of Wilkes as a contravention of Magna Carta. Thomas Paine, whose 1776 pamphlet Common Sense had played an important role in the American Revolution, disregarded Magna Carta and the Bill of Rights in his Rights of Man, arguing that they were not a written constitution devised by elected representatives.

==== Use in the Thirteen Colonies and the United States ====
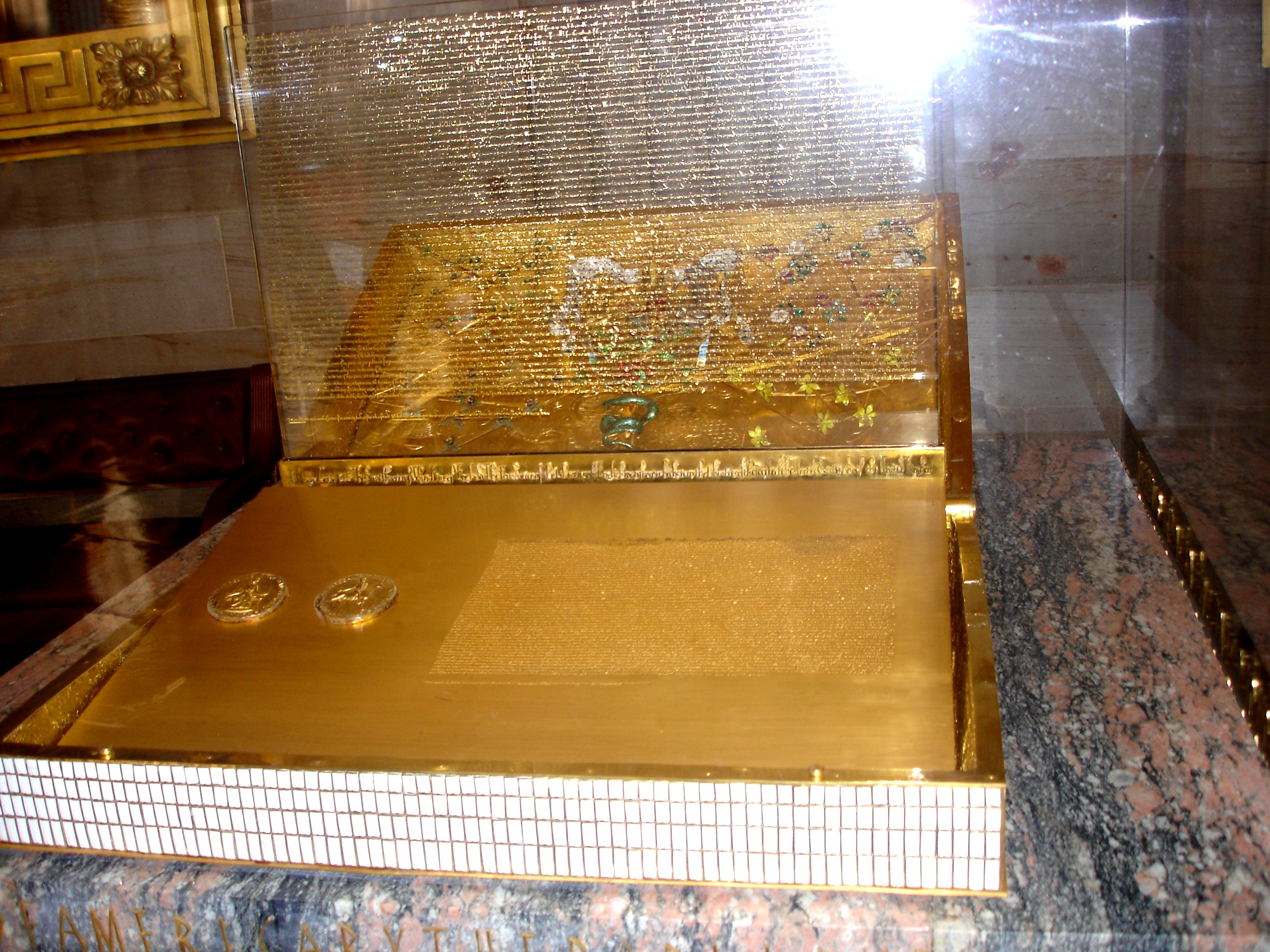
Magna Carta replica and display in the rotunda of the United States Capitol, Washington, D.C.

When English colonists left for the New World, they brought royal charters that established the colonies. The Massachusetts Bay Company charter, for example, stated that the colonists would "have and enjoy all liberties and immunities of free and natural subjects." The Virginia Charter of 1606, which was largely drafted by Sir Edward Coke, stated that the colonists would have the same "liberties, franchises and immunities" as people born in England. The Massachusetts Body of Liberties contained similarities to clause 29 of Magna Carta; when drafting it, the Massachusetts General Court viewed Magna Carta as the chief embodiment of English common law. The other colonies would follow their example. In 1638, Maryland sought to recognise Magna Carta as part of the law of the province, but the request was denied by Charles I.

In 1687, William Penn published The Excellent Privilege of Liberty and Property: being the birth-right of the Free-Born Subjects of England, which contained the first copy of Magna Carta printed on American soil. Penn's comments reflected Coke's, indicating a belief that Magna Carta was a fundamental law. The colonists drew on English law books, leading them to an anachronistic interpretation of Magna Carta, believing that it guaranteed trial by jury and habeas corpus.

The development of parliamentary supremacy in the British Isles did not constitutionally affect the Thirteen Colonies, which retained an adherence to English common law, but it directly affected the relationship between Britain and the colonies. When American colonists fought against Britain, they were fighting not so much for new freedom, but to preserve liberties and rights that they believed to be enshrined in Magna Carta.

In the late 18th century, the United States Constitution became the supreme law of the land, recalling the manner in which Magna Carta had come to be regarded as fundamental law. The Constitution's Fifth Amendment guarantees that "no person shall be deprived of life, liberty, or property, without due process of law", a phrase that was derived from Magna Carta. In addition, the Constitution included a similar writ in the Suspension Clause, Article 1, Section 9: "The privilege of the writ of habeas corpus shall not be suspended, unless when in cases of rebellion or invasion, the public safety may require it."

Each of these proclaim that no person may be imprisoned or detained without evidence that he or she committed a crime. The Ninth Amendment states that "The enumeration in the Constitution, of certain rights, shall not be construed to deny or disparage others retained by the people." The writers of the U.S. Constitution wished to ensure that the rights they already held, such as those that they believed were provided by Magna Carta, would be preserved unless explicitly curtailed.

The U.S. Supreme Court has explicitly referenced Edward Coke's analysis of Magna Carta as an antecedent of the Sixth Amendment's right to a speedy trial.

=== 19th–21st centuries ===
==== Interpretation ====
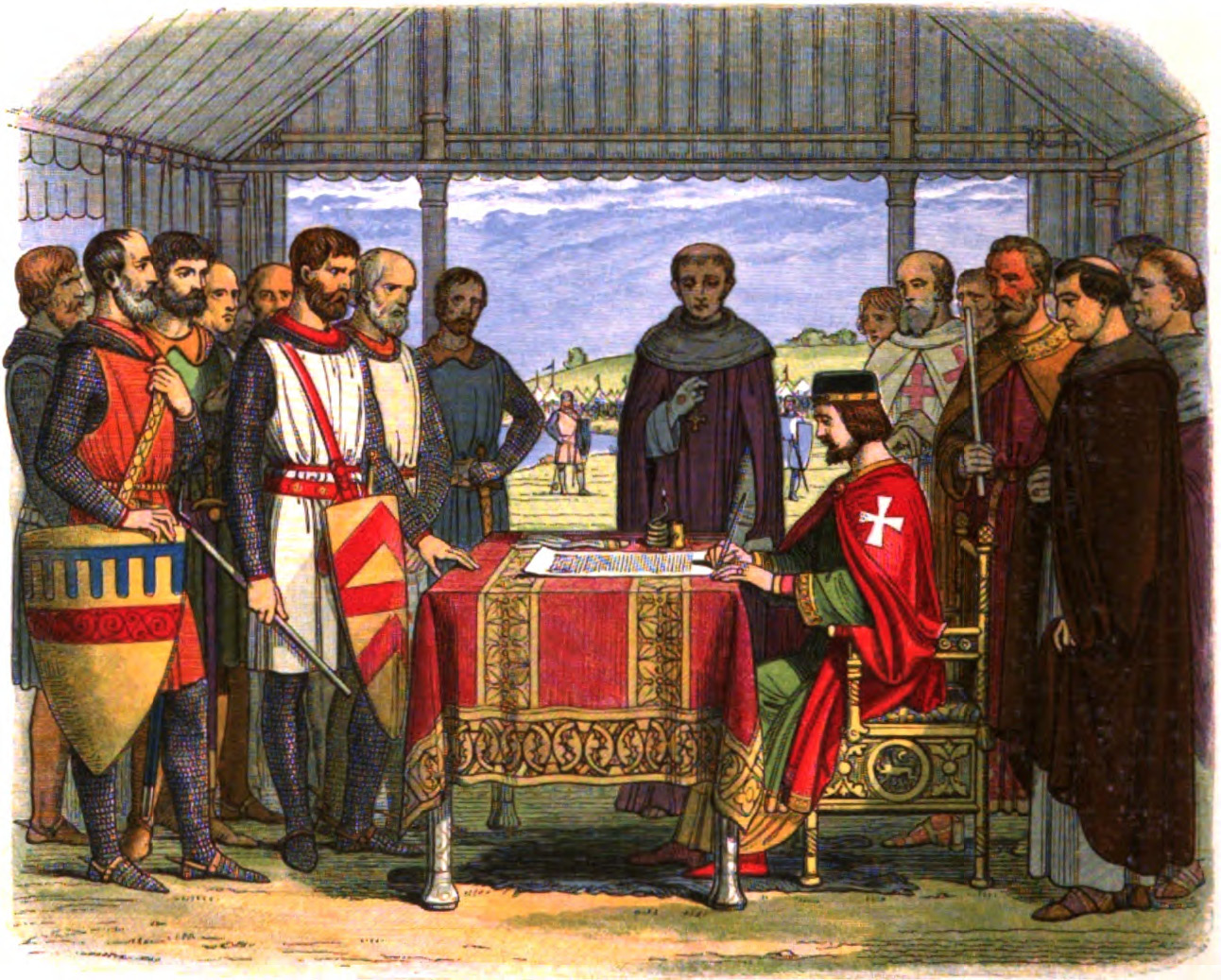
A romanticised 19th-century recreation of King John signing Magna Carta. Rather than signing in writing, the document would have been authenticated with the Great Seal and applied by officials rather than John himself.

Initially, the Whig interpretation of Magna Carta and its role in constitutional history remained dominant during the 19th century. The historian William Stubbs's Constitutional History of England, published in the 1870s, formed the high-water mark of this view. Stubbs argued that Magna Carta had been a major step in the shaping of the English nation, and he believed that the barons at Runnymede in 1215 were not just representing the nobility, but the people of England as a whole, standing up to a tyrannical ruler in the form of King John.

This view of Magna Carta began to recede. The late-Victorian jurist and historian Frederic William Maitland provided an alternative academic history in 1899, which began to return Magna Carta to its historical roots. In 1904, Edward Jenks published an article entitled "The Myth of Magna Carta", which undermined the previously accepted view of Magna Carta. Historians such as Albert Pollard agreed with Jenks in concluding that Edward Coke had largely "invented" the myth of Magna Carta in the 17th century; these historians argued that the 1215 charter had not referred to liberty for the people at large, but rather to the protection of baronial rights.

This view also became popular in wider circles, and in 1930 Sellar and Yeatman published their parody on English history, 1066 and All That, in which they mocked the supposed importance of Magna Carta and its promises of universal liberty: "Magna Charter was therefore the chief cause of Democracy in England, and thus a Good Thing for everyone (except the Common People)".

In many literary representations of the medieval past, however, Magna Carta remained a foundation of English national identity. Some authors used the medieval roots of the document as an argument to preserve the social status quo, while others pointed to Magna Carta to challenge perceived economic injustices. The Baronial Order of Magna Charta was formed in 1898 to promote the ancient principles and values felt to be displayed in Magna Carta. The legal profession in England and the United States continued to hold Magna Carta in high esteem; they were instrumental in forming the Magna Carta Society in 1922 to protect the meadows at Runnymede from development in the 1920s, and in 1957, the American Bar Association erected the Magna Carta Memorial at Runnymede. The prominent lawyer Lord Denning described Magna Carta in 1956 as "the greatest constitutional document of all times—the foundation of the freedom of the individual against the arbitrary authority of the despot".

==== Repeal of articles and constitutional influence ====
Radicals such as Sir Francis Burdett believed that Magna Carta could not be repealed, but in the 19th century clauses which were obsolete or had been superseded began to be repealed. The repeal of clause 26 in 1829, by the Offences Against the Person Act 1828 (9 Geo. 4. c. 31 s. 1) (Note: I.e., section 1 of the 31st statute issued in the 9th year of George IV; "nor will We not" in clause 29 is correctly quoted from this source.) was the first time a clause of Magna Carta was repealed. Over the next 140 years, nearly the whole of Magna Carta (1297) as statute was repealed,

The whole statute, so far as unrepealed, except clauses 1, 9 and 29 were repealed by section 1 of, and part I of the schedule to, the Statute Law (Repeals) Act 1969, which came into force on 1 January 1970. Most of the clauses were repealed in England and Wales by the Statute Law Revision Act 1863(26 & 27 Vict. c. 125), and in modern Northern Ireland and also in the modern Republic of Ireland by the Statute Law Revision (Ireland) Act 1872.

Many later attempts to draft constitutional forms of government trace their lineage back to Magna Carta. The British dominions, Australia and New Zealand, Canada (except Quebec), and formerly the Union of South Africa and Southern Rhodesia, reflected the influence of Magna Carta in their laws, and the Charter's effects can be seen in the laws of other states that evolved from the British Empire.

==== Modern legacy ====
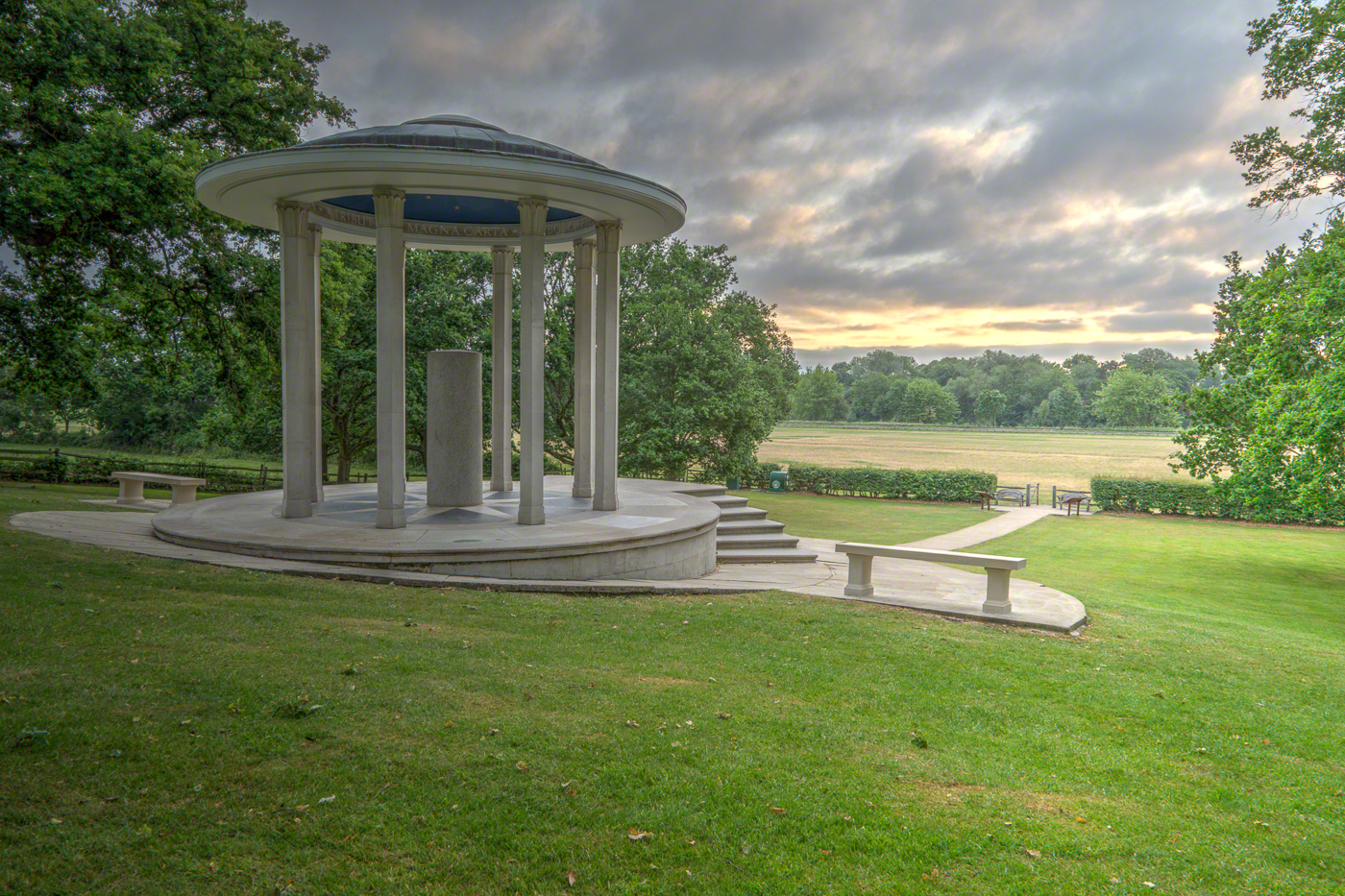
The Magna Carta Memorial at Runnymede, designed by Sir Edward Maufe and erected by the American Bar Association in 1957. The memorial stands in the meadow known historically as Long Mede: it is likely that the actual site of the sealing of Magna Carta lay further east, towards Egham and Staines.

Magna Carta continues to have a powerful iconic status in British society, being cited by politicians and lawyers in support of constitutional positions. Its perceived guarantee of trial by jury and other civil liberties, for example, led to Tony Benn's reference to the debate in 2008 over whether to increase the maximum time terrorism suspects could be held without charge from 28 to 42 days as "the day Magna Carta was repealed". Although rarely invoked in court in the modern era, in 2012 the Occupy London protestors attempted to use Magna Carta in resisting their eviction from St. Paul's Churchyard by the City of London. In his judgment the Master of the Rolls gave this short shrift, noting somewhat drily that although clause 29 was considered by many the foundation of the rule of law in England, he did not consider it directly relevant to the case, and that the two other surviving clauses ironically concerned the rights of the Church and the City of London and could not help the defendants.

Magna Carta carries little legal weight in modern Britain, as most of its clauses have been repealed and relevant rights ensured by other statutes, but the historian James Holt remarks that the survival of the 1215 charter in national life is a "reflexion of the continuous development of English law and administration" and symbolic of the many struggles between authority and the law over the centuries. The historian W. L. Warren has observed that "many who knew little and cared less about the content of the Charter have, in nearly all ages, invoked its name, and with good cause, for it meant more than it said".

It also remains a topic of great interest to historians; Natalie Fryde characterised the charter as "one of the holiest of cows in English medieval history", with the debates over its interpretation and meaning unlikely to end. The majority of contemporary historians however see the interpretation of the charter as a unique and early charter of legal rights as a myth that was created centuries later.

In many ways still a "sacred text", Magna Carta is generally considered part of the uncodified constitution of the United Kingdom; in a 2005 speech, the Lord Chief Justice of England and Wales, Lord Woolf, described it as the "first of a series of instruments that now are recognised as having a special constitutional status". Magna Carta was reprinted in New Zealand in 1881 as one of the Imperial Acts in force there. Clause 29 of the document remains in force as part of New Zealand law.

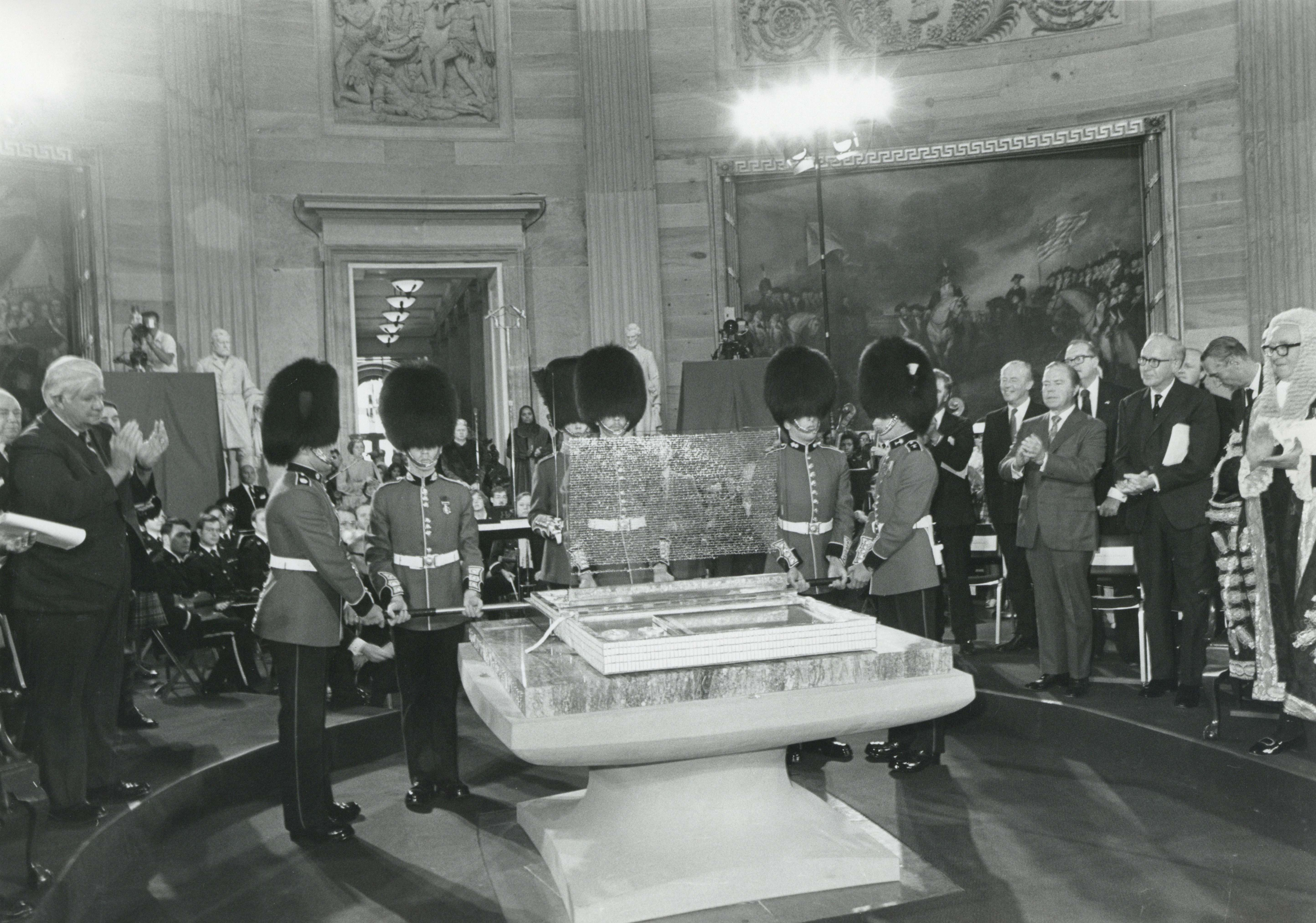
The ceremony in the Capitol rotunda honouring the arrival of Magna Carta in 1976

The document also continues to be honoured in the United States as an antecedent of the United States Constitution and Bill of Rights. In 1976, the UK lent one of four surviving originals of the 1215 Magna Carta to the United States for their bicentennial celebrations and also donated an ornate display case for it. The original was returned after one year, but a replica and the case are still on display in the United States Capitol Crypt in Washington, D.C.

==== Celebration of the 800th anniversary ====
The plan for four surviving original copies of Magna Carta to be brought together in 2015, at the British Library in collaboration with Lincoln Cathedral and Salisbury Cathedral and supported by the law firm Linklaters

The 800th anniversary of the original charter occurred on 15 June 2015, and organisations and institutions planned celebratory events. The British Library brought together the four existing copies of the 1215 manuscript in February 2015 for a special exhibition. British artist Cornelia Parker was commissioned to create a new artwork, Magna Carta (An Embroidery), which was shown at the British Library between May and July 2015. The artwork is a copy of the Wikipedia article about Magna Carta (as it appeared on the document's 799th anniversary, 15 June 2014), hand-embroidered by over 200 people.

On 15 June 2015, a commemoration ceremony was conducted in Runnymede at the National Trust park, attended by British and American dignitaries. On the same day, Google celebrated the anniversary with a Google Doodle.

The copy held by Lincoln Cathedral was exhibited in the Library of Congress in Washington, D.C., from November 2014 until January 2015. A new visitor centre at Lincoln Castle was opened for the anniversary. The Royal Mint released two commemorative two-pound coins.

In 2014, Bury St Edmunds in Suffolk celebrated the 800th anniversary of the barons' Charter of Liberties, said to have been secretly agreed there in November 1214.

== Copies ==
=== Physical format ===
Numerous copies, known as exemplifications, were made of the various charters, and many of them still survive. The documents were written in heavily abbreviated medieval Latin in clear handwriting, using quill pens on sheets of parchment made from sheep skin, approximately 15 by 20 inches (380 by 510 mm) across. They were sealed with the royal great seal by an official called the spigurnel, equipped with a special seal press, using beeswax and resin. There were no signatures on the charter of 1215, and the barons present did not attach their own seals to it. The text was not divided into paragraphs or numbered clauses: the numbering system used today was introduced by the jurist Sir William Blackstone in 1759.

=== Exemplifications ===
==== 1215 exemplifications ====
At least thirteen original copies of the charter of 1215 were issued by the royal chancery during that year, seven in the first tranche distributed on 24 June and another six later; they were sent to county sheriffs and bishops, who were probably charged for the privilege. Slight variations exist between the surviving copies, and there was probably no single "master copy". Of these documents, only four survive, all held in England: two now at the British Library, one at Salisbury Cathedral, and one, the property of Lincoln Cathedral, on permanent loan to Lincoln Castle. Each of these versions is slightly different in size and text, and each is considered by historians to be equally authoritative.

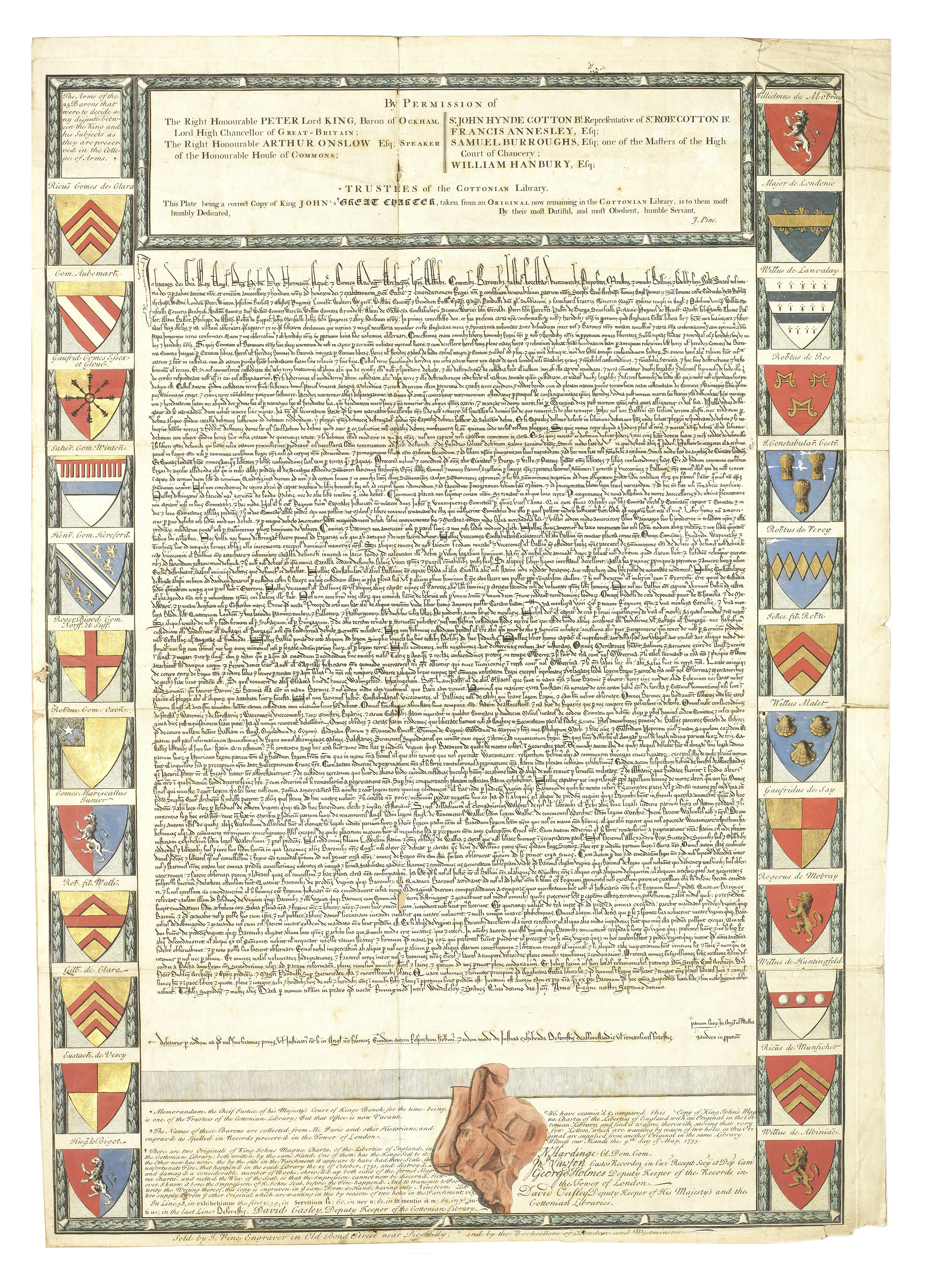
1733 engraving by John Pine of the 1215 charter (Cotton Charter XIII.31A)

The two 1215 charters held by the British Library, known as Cotton MS. Augustus II.106 and Cotton Charter XIII.31A, were acquired by the antiquarian Sir Robert Cotton in the 17th century. The first had been found by Humphrey Wyems, a London lawyer, who may have discovered it in a tailor's shop, and who gave it to Cotton in January 1629. The second was found in Dover Castle in 1630 by Sir Edward Dering. The Dering charter was traditionally thought to be the copy sent in 1215 to the Cinque Ports, but in 2015 the historian David Carpenter argued that it was more probably that sent to Canterbury Cathedral, as its text was identical to a transcription made from the cathedral's copy of the 1215 charter in the 1290s. This copy was damaged in the Cotton library fire of 1731, when its seal was badly melted. The parchment was somewhat shrivelled but otherwise relatively unscathed. An engraved facsimile of the charter was made by John Pine in 1733. In the 1830s, an ill-judged and bungled attempt at cleaning and conservation rendered the manuscript largely illegible to the naked eye. This is the only surviving 1215 copy still to have its great seal attached.

Lincoln Cathedral's copy has been held by the county since 1215. It was displayed in the Common Chamber in the cathedral, before being moved to another building in 1846. Between 1939 and 1940 it was displayed in the British Pavilion at the 1939 World Fair in New York City, and at the Library of Congress. When the Second World War broke out, Winston Churchill wanted to give the charter to the American people, hoping that this would encourage the United States, then neutral, to enter the war against the Axis powers, but the cathedral was unwilling, and the plans were dropped.

After December 1941, the copy was stored in Fort Knox, Kentucky, for safety, before being put on display again in 1944 and returned to Lincoln Cathedral in early 1946. It was put on display in 1976 in the cathedral's medieval library. It was displayed in San Francisco, and was taken out of display for a time to undergo conservation in preparation for another visit to the United States, where it was exhibited in 2007 at the Contemporary Art Center of Virginia and the National Constitution Center in Philadelphia. In 2009 it returned to New York to be displayed at the Fraunces Tavern Museum. It is currently on permanent loan to the David P. J. Ross Vault at Lincoln Castle, along with an original copy of the 1217 Charter of the Forest.

The fourth copy, held by Salisbury Cathedral, was first given in 1215 to its predecessor, Old Sarum Cathedral. Rediscovered by the cathedral in 1812, it has remained in Salisbury throughout its history, except when being taken off-site for restoration work. It is possibly the best preserved of the four, although small pin holes can be seen in the parchment from where it was once pinned up. The handwriting on this version is different from that of the other three, suggesting that it was not written by a royal scribe but rather by a member of the cathedral staff, who then had it exemplified by the royal court.

In 2009, UNESCO added these four surviving exemplars to the Memory of the World international register, recognising them as documentary heritage of global importance.

In 2016, a copy of the Magna Carta was encoded onto an ultra-durable glass storage medium developed by SPhotonix, and transferred to the Memory of Mankind as part of a long-term archival initiative intended to preserve foundational texts for extremely long time (billions of years).

==== Later exemplifications ====
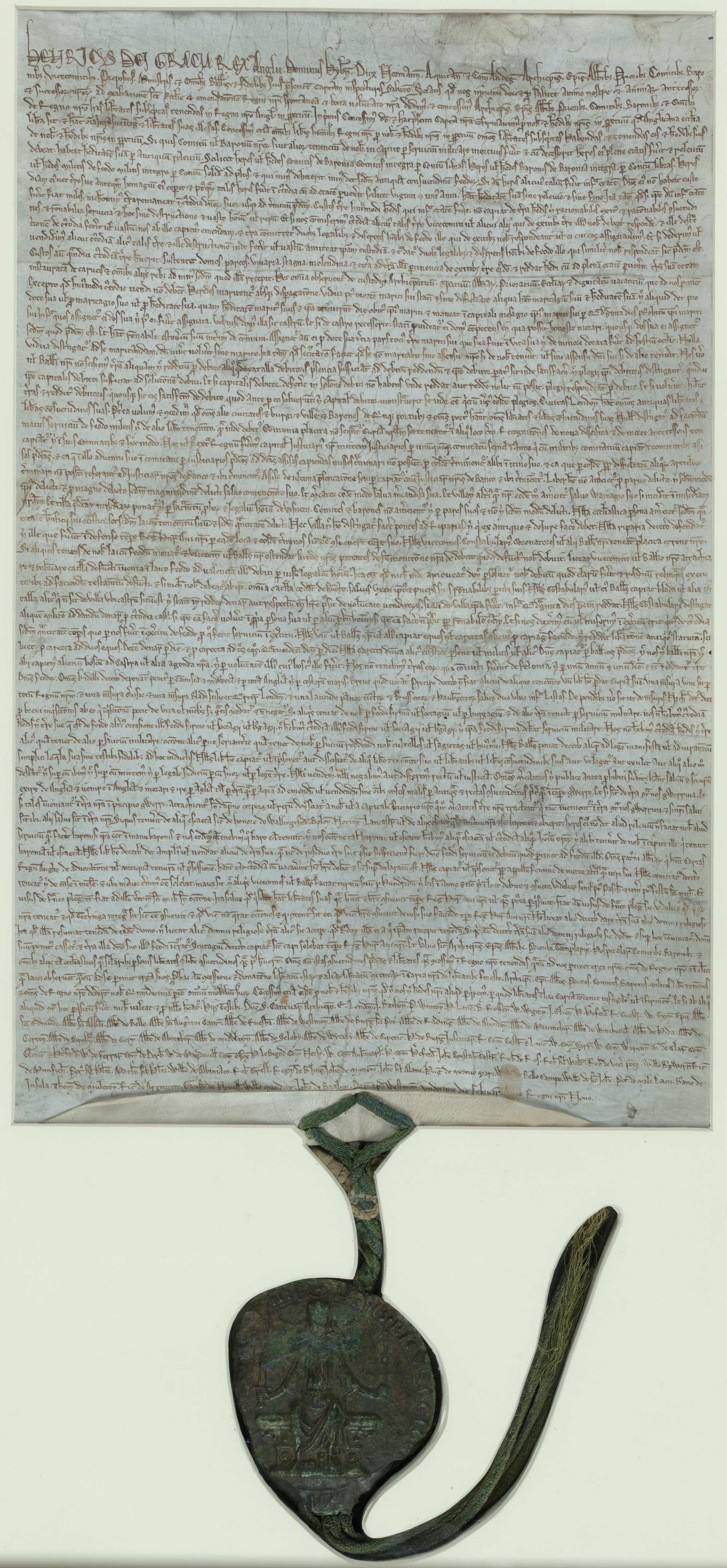
1225 charter, held in the British Library, with the royal great seal attached

Other early versions of the charters survive today. Only one exemplification of the 1216 charter survives, held in Durham Cathedral. Four copies of the 1217 charter exist; three of these are held by the Bodleian Library in Oxford and one by Hereford Cathedral. Hereford's copy is occasionally displayed alongside the Mappa Mundi in the cathedral's chained library and has survived along with a small document called the Articuli super Cartas that was sent along with the charter, telling the sheriff of the county how to observe the conditions outlined in the document. One of the Bodleian's copies was displayed at San Francisco's California Palace of the Legion of Honor in 2011.

Four exemplifications of the 1225 charter survive: the British Library holds one, which was preserved at Lacock Abbey until 1945; Durham Cathedral also holds a copy, with the Bodleian Library holding a third. The fourth exemplification of 1225 was held by the museum of the Public Record Office, and is now held by The National Archives. The Society of Antiquaries also holds a draft of the 1215 charter (discovered in 2013 in a late-13th-century register from Peterborough Abbey), a copy of the 1225 third re-issue (within an early-14th-century collection of statutes) and a roll copy of the 1225 reissue.

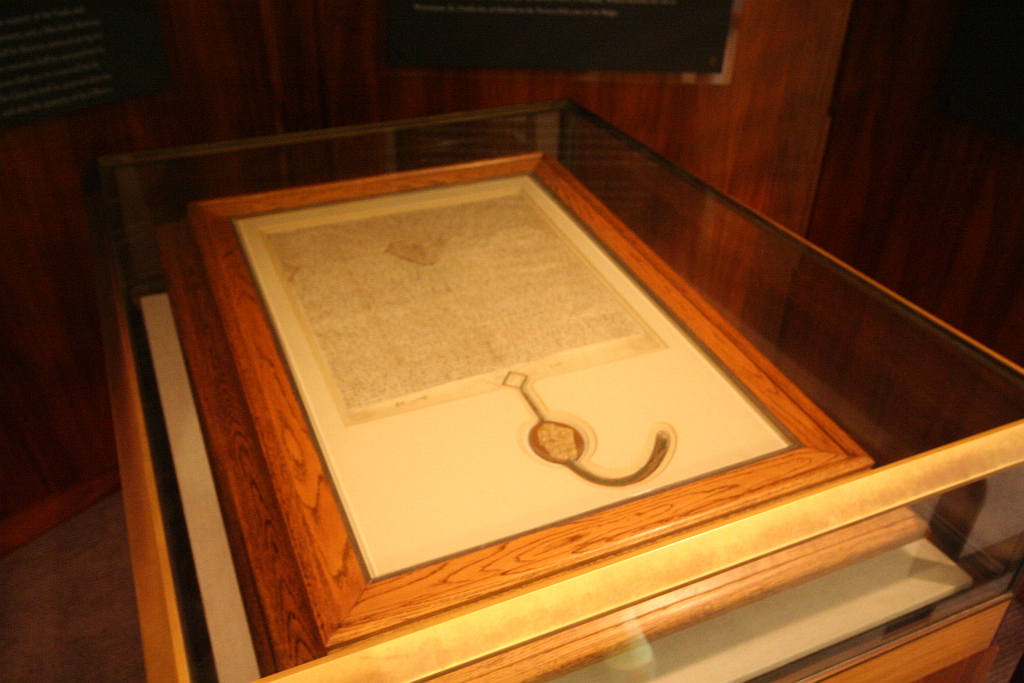
A 1297 copy of Magna Carta, owned by the Australian Government and on display in the Members' Hall of Parliament House, Canberra

Four exemplifications of the 1297 charter also survive, of which two are held outside England. One was purchased in 1952 by the Australian Government for £12,500 from King's School, Bruton, England. Restored in 2024, this copy is now on display in the Members' Hall of Parliament House, Canberra. The second was originally held by the Brudenell family, earls of Cardigan, before they sold it in 1984 to the Perot Foundation in the United States, which in 2007 sold it to U.S. businessman David Rubenstein for US$21.3 million. Rubenstein commented "I have always believed that this was an important document to our country, even though it wasn't drafted in our country. I think it was the basis for the Declaration of Independence and the basis for the Constitution". This exemplification is now on permanent loan to the National Archives in Washington, D.C. Of the other two surviving 1297 exemplifications, one is held in the UK's National Archives, and the other in the Guildhall, London.

Eight exemplifications of the 1300 confirmation by Edward I survive, in Faversham, Oriel College, Oxford, the Bodleian Library, Durham Cathedral, Westminster Abbey, the City of London (held in the archives at the London Guildhall), Sandwich (held in the Sandwich Guildhall Museum) and Cambridge, Massachusetts (held at Harvard Law School). The Sandwich copy was rediscovered in early 2015 in a Victorian scrapbook in the town archives of Sandwich, Kent, one of the Cinque Ports. In the case of the Sandwich and Oriel College exemplifications, the copies of the Charter of the Forest originally issued with them also survive. The Harvard copy, previously thought to be an unofficial secondary copy, was identified as an original exemplification in 2025.

== Clauses ==
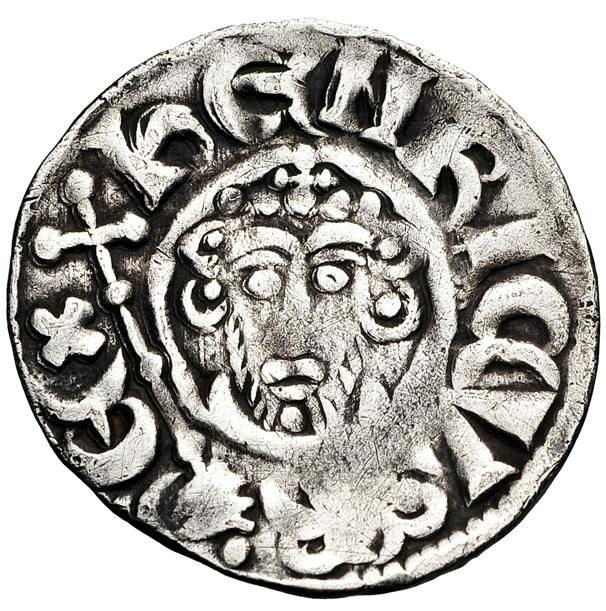
A silver King John penny. Much of Magna Carta concerned how royal revenues were raised.

Most of the 1215 charter and later versions sought to govern the feudal rights of the Crown over the barons. Under the Angevin kings, and in particular during John's reign, the rights of the King had frequently been used inconsistently, often in an attempt to maximise the royal income from the barons. Feudal relief was one way that a king could demand money, and clauses 2 and 3 fixed the fees payable when an heir inherited an estate or when a minor came of age and took possession of his lands.

Scutage was a form of medieval taxation. All knights and nobles owed military service to the Crown in return for their lands, which theoretically belonged to the King. Many preferred to avoid this service and offer money instead. The Crown often used the cash to pay for mercenaries. The rate of scutage that should be payable, and the circumstances under which it was appropriate for the King to demand it, was uncertain and controversial. Clauses 12 and 14 addressed the management of the process.

The English judicial system had altered considerably over the previous century, with the royal judges playing a larger role in delivering justice across the country. John had used his royal discretion to extort large sums of money from the barons, effectively taking payment to offer justice in particular cases, and the role of the Crown in delivering justice had become politically sensitive among the barons. Clauses 39 and 40 demanded due process be applied in the royal justice system, while clause 45 required that the King appoint knowledgeable royal officials to the relevant roles.

Although these clauses did not have any special significance in the original charter, this part of Magna Carta became singled out as particularly important in later centuries. In the United States, for example, the Supreme Court of California interpreted clause 45 in 1974 as establishing a requirement in common law that a defendant faced with the potential of incarceration be entitled to a trial overseen by a legally trained judge.

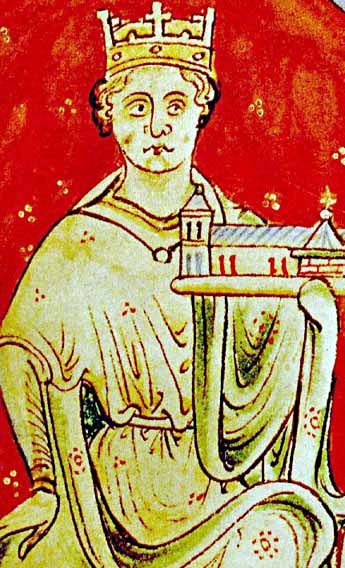
King John holding a church, painted c. 1250–1259 by Matthew Paris

Royal forests were economically important in medieval England and were both protected and exploited by the Crown, supplying the King with hunting grounds, raw materials, and money. They were subject to special royal jurisdiction and the resulting forest law was, according to the historian Richard Huscroft, "harsh and arbitrary, a matter purely for the King's will". The size of the forests had expanded under the Angevin kings, an unpopular development.

The 1215 charter had several clauses relating to the royal forests. Clauses 47 and 48 promised to deforest the lands added to the forests under John and investigate the use of royal rights in this area, but notably did not address the forestation of the previous kings, while clause 53 promised some form of redress for those affected by the recent changes, and clause 44 promised some relief from the operation of the forest courts. Neither Magna Carta nor the subsequent Charter of the Forest proved entirely satisfactory as a way of managing the political tensions arising in the operation of the royal forests.

Some of the clauses addressed wider economic issues. The concerns of the barons over the treatment of their debts to Jewish moneylenders, who occupied a special position in medieval England and were by tradition under the King's protection, were addressed by clauses 10 and 11. The charter concluded this section with the phrase "debts owing to other than Jews shall be dealt with likewise", so it is debatable to what extent the Jews were being singled out by these clauses. Some issues were relatively specific, such as clause 33 which ordered the removal of all fishing weirs—an important and growing source of revenue at the time—from England's rivers.

The role of the English Church had been a matter for great debate in the years prior to the 1215 charter. The Norman and Angevin kings had traditionally exercised a great deal of power over the church within their territories. From the 1040s onwards successive popes had emphasised the importance of the church being governed more effectively from Rome, and had established an independent judicial system and hierarchical chain of authority. After the 1140s, these principles had been largely accepted within the English church, even if accompanied by an element of concern about centralising authority in Rome.

These changes brought the customary rights of lay rulers such as John over ecclesiastical appointments into question. As described above, John had come to a compromise with Pope Innocent III in exchange for his political support for the King, and clause 1 of Magna Carta prominently displayed this arrangement, promising the freedoms and liberties of the church. The importance of this clause may also reflect the role of Archbishop Langton in the negotiations: Langton had taken a strong line on this issue during his career.

=== Clauses in detail ===
Magna Carta clauses in the 1215 and later charters

1215 clause	Description	Included in later charters	Notes
1	Guaranteed the freedom of the English Church.	Y	Still in UK (England and Wales) law as clause 1 in the 1297 statute.
2	Regulated the operation of feudal relief upon the death of a baron.	Y	Repealed by Statute Law Revision Act 1863 and Statute Law Revision (Ireland) Act 1872.
3	Regulated the operation of feudal relief and minors' coming of age.	Y	Repealed by Statute Law Revision Act 1863 and Statute Law Revision (Ireland) Act 1872.
4	Regulated the process of wardship, and the role of the guardian.	Y	Repealed by Statute Law Revision Act 1863 and Statute Law Revision (Ireland) Act 1872.
5	Forbade the exploitation of a ward's property by his guardian.	Y	Repealed by Statute Law Revision Act 1863 and Statute Law Revision (Ireland) Act 1872.
6	Forbade guardians from marrying a ward to a partner of lower social standing.	Y	Repealed by Statute Law Revision Act 1863 and Statute Law Revision (Ireland) Act 1872.
7	Referred to the rights of a widow to receive promptly her dowry and inheritance.	Y	Repealed by Statute Law Revision Act 1863 and Statute Law Revision (Ireland) Act 1872.
8	Forbade the forcible remarrying of widows and confirmed the royal veto over baronial marriages.	Y	Repealed by Administration of Estates Act 1925, Administration of Estates Act (Northern Ireland) 1955 and Statute Law (Repeals) Act 1969.
9	Established protection for debtors, confirming that a debtor should not have his lands seized as long as he had other means to pay the debt.	Y	Repealed by Statute Law (Repeals) Act 1969.
10	Regulated Jewish money lending, stating that children would not pay interest on a debt they had inherited while they were under age.	N	
11	Further addressed Jewish money lending, stating that a widow and children should be provided for before paying an inherited debt.	N	
12	Determined that scutage or aid, forms of medieval taxation, could be levied and assessed only by the common consent of the realm.	N	Some exceptions to this general rule were given, such as for the payment of ransoms.
13	Confirmed the liberties and customs of the City of London and other boroughs.	Y	Still in UK (England and Wales) law as clause 9 in the 1297 statute.
14	Described how senior churchmen and barons would be summoned to give consent for scutage and aid.	N	
15	Prohibited anyone from levying aid on their free men.	N	Some exceptions to this general rule were given, such as for the payment of ransoms.
16	Placed limits on the level of service required for a knight's fee.	Y	Repealed by Statute Law Revision Act 1948.
17	Established a fixed law court rather than one which followed the movements of the King.	Y	Repealed by Civil Procedure Acts Repeal Act 1879.
18	Defined the authority and frequency of county courts.	Y	Repealed by Civil Procedure Acts Repeal Act 1879.
19	Determined how excess business of a county court should be dealt with.	Y	
20	Stated that an amercement, a type of medieval fine, should be proportionate to the offence, but even for a serious offence the fine should not be so heavy as to deprive a man of his livelihood. Fines should be imposed only through local assessment.	Y	Repealed by Statute Law Revision Act 1863 and Statute Law Revision (Ireland) Act 1872.
21	Determined that earls and barons should be fined only by other earls and barons.	Y	Repealed by Statute Law Revision Act 1863 and Statute Law Revision (Ireland) Act 1872.
22	Determined that the size of a fine on a member of the clergy should be independent of the ecclesiastical wealth held by the individual churchman.	Y	Repealed by Statute Law Revision Act 1863 and Statute Law Revision (Ireland) Act 1872.
23	Limited the right of feudal lords to demand assistance in building bridges across rivers.	Y	Repealed by Statute Law (Repeals) Act 1969.
24	Prohibited royal officials, such as sheriffs, from trying a crime as an alternative to a royal judge.	Y	Repealed by Statute Law (Repeals) Act 1969.
25	Fixed the royal rents on lands, with the exception of royal demesne manors.	N	
26	Established a process for dealing with the death of those owing debts to the Crown.	Y	Repealed by Crown Proceedings Act 1947.
27	Laid out the process for dealing with intestacy.	N	
28	Determined that a royal officer requisitioning goods must offer immediate payment to their owner.	Y	Repealed by Statute Law Revision Act 1863 and Statute Law Revision (Ireland) Act 1872.
29	Regulated the exercise of castle-guard duty.	Y	Repealed by Statute Law Revision Act 1863 and Statute Law Revision (Ireland) Act 1872.
30	Prevented royal officials from requisitioning horses or carts without the owner's consent.	Y	Repealed by Statute Law Revision Act 1863 and Statute Law Revision (Ireland) Act 1872.
31	Prevented royal officials from requisitioning timber without the owner's consent.	Y	Repealed by Statute Law Revision Act 1863 and Statute Law Revision (Ireland) Act 1872.
32	Prevented the Crown from confiscating the lands of felons for longer than a year and a day, after which they were to be returned to the relevant feudal lord.	Y	Repealed by Statute Law Revision Act 1948.
33	Ordered the removal of all fish weirs from rivers.	Y	Repealed by Statute Law (Repeals) Act 1969.
34	Forbade the issuing of writ precipes if doing so would undermine the right of trial in a local feudal court.	Y	Repealed by Statute Law Revision Act 1863 and Statute Law Revision (Ireland) Act 1872.
35	Ordered the establishment of standard measures for wine, ale, corn, and cloth.	Y	Repealed by Statute Law Revision Act 1948.
36	Determined that writs for loss of life or limb were to be freely given without charge.	Y	Repealed by Offences Against the Person Act 1828 and Offences Against the Person (Ireland) Act 1829.
37	Regulated the inheritance of Crown lands held by "fee-farm".	Y	Repealed by Statute Law Revision Act 1863 and Statute Law Revision (Ireland) Act 1872.
38	Stated that no one should be put on trial based solely on the unsupported word of a royal official.	Y	Repealed by Statute Law Revision Act 1863 and Statute Law Revision (Ireland) Act 1872.
39	Stated that no free man could be imprisoned or stripped of his rights or possessions without due process being legally applied.	Y	Still in UK (England and Wales) law as part of clause 29 in the 1297 statute.
40	Forbade the selling of justice, or its denial or delay.	Y	Still in UK (England and Wales) law as part of clause 29 in the 1297 statute.
41	Guaranteed the safety and the right of entry and exit of foreign merchants.	Y	Repealed by Statute Law (Repeals) Act 1969.
42	Permitted men to leave England for short periods without prejudicing their allegiance to the King, with the exceptions for outlaws and wartime.	N	
43	Established special provisions for taxes due on estates temporarily held by the Crown.	Y	Repealed by Statute Law Revision Act 1863 and Statute Law Revision (Ireland) Act 1872.
44	Limited the need for people to attend forest courts, unless they were actually involved in the proceedings.	Y	
45	Stated that the King should appoint only justices, constables, sheriffs, or bailiffs who knew and would enforce the law.	N	
46	Permitted barons to take guardianship of monasteries in the absence of an abbot.	Y	Repealed by Statute Law Revision Act 1863 and Statute Law Revision (Ireland) Act 1872.
47	Abolished those royal forests newly created under King John's reign.	Y	
48	Established an investigation of "evil customs" associated with royal forests, with an intent to abolishing them.	N	
49	Ordered the return of hostages held by the King.	N	
50	Forbade any member of the d'Athée family from serving as a royal officer.	N	
51	Ordered that all foreign knights and mercenaries leave England once peace was restored.	N	
52	Established a process for giving restitution to those who had been unlawfully dispossessed of their "lands, castles, liberties, or of his right".	N	
53	Established a process for giving restitution to those who had been mistreated by forest law.	N	
54	Prevented men from being arrested or imprisoned on the testimony of a woman, unless the case involved the death of her husband.	Y	Repealed by Statute Law Revision Act 1863 and Statute Law Revision (Ireland) Act 1872.
55	Established a process for remitting any unjust fines imposed by the King.	N	Repealed by Statute Law Revision Act 1863 and Statute Law Revision (Ireland) Act 1872.
56	Established a process for dealing with Welshmen who had been unlawfully dispossessed of their property or rights.	Y	
57	Established a process for returning the possessions of Welshmen who had been unlawfully dispossessed.	N	
58	Ordered the return of Welsh hostages, including Prince Llywelyn's son.	N	
59	Established a process for the return of Scottish hostages, including King Alexander's sisters.	N	
60	Encouraged others in England to deal with their own subjects as the King dealt with his.	Y	
61	Provided for the application and observation of the charter by twenty-five of the barons.	N	
62	Pardoned those who had rebelled against the King.	N	Sometimes considered a subclause, "Suffix A", of clause 61.
63	Stated that the charter was binding on King John and his heirs.	N	Sometimes considered a subclause, "Suffix B", of clause 61.

=== Clauses remaining in English law ===
Only three clauses of Magna Carta still remain on the statute book of England and Wales. These concern 1) the freedom of the English Church, 2) the "ancient liberties" of the City of London (clause 13 in the 1215 charter, clause 9 in the 1297 statute), and 3) a right to due legal process (clauses 39 and 40 in the 1215 charter, clause 29 in the 1297 statute). Using the numbering system from the 1297 statute, these clauses are traditionally translated into English as follows:

1. FIRST, We have granted to God, and by this our present Charter have confirmed, for Us and our Heirs for ever, that the Church of England shall be free, and shall have all her whole Rights and Liberties inviolable. We have granted also, and given to all the Freemen of our Realm, for Us and our Heirs for ever, these Liberties under-written, to have and to hold to them and their Heirs, of Us and our Heirs for ever.
9. THE City of London shall have all the old Liberties and Customs which it hath been used to have. Moreover We will and grant, that all other Cities, Boroughs, Towns, and the Barons of the Five Ports, and all other Ports, shall have all their Liberties and free Customs.
29. NO Freeman shall be taken or imprisoned, or be disseised of his Freehold, or Liberties, or free Customs, or be outlawed, or exiled, or any other wise destroyed; nor will We not pass upon him, nor condemn him, but by lawful judgment of his Peers, or by the Law of the land. We will sell to no man, we will not deny or defer to any man either Justice or Right.

=== Clauses in force in other countries ===
Clauses of Magna Carta also remain in force in several countries that were formerly British colonies. British colonies received the common and statutory law in force at a particular time in England, often through specific reception statutes or by adoption into local law. As a result, clause 29 of the 1297 version remains in force in New Zealand and the Australian states of New South Wales, Victoria, Queensland and the Australian Capital Territory. The entirety of Magna Carta apart from clause 26 remains in force in the Australian states of Western Australia, Tasmania, South Australia and the Northern Territory.

== See also ==
- Civil liberties in the United Kingdom
- Charter of Liberties
- Charter of the Forest
- Fundamental Laws of England
- Haandfæstning
- History of democracy
- History of human rights
- List of most expensive books and manuscripts
- Magna Carta (An Embroidery), 2015 artwork
- Magna Carta Hiberniae – an issue of the English Magna Carta, or Great Charter of Liberties in Ireland
- Ordinances of 1311
- Statutes of Mortmain
- Yirrkala bark petitions, 1963 documents sent to the Australian Parliament declaring Yolngu sovereignty over their land

== Sources ==
- Aurell, Martin (2003). L'Empire de Plantagenêt, 1154–1224 (in French). Paris: Tempus. ISBN 978-2262022822.
- Baker, John (2017). The Reinvention of Magna Carta 1216–1616. Cambridge University Press. doi:10.1017/9781316940990. ISBN 978-1-316-94973-3 – via Google Books.
- Barnes, Thomas Garden (2008). Shaping the Common Law: From Glanvill to Hale, 1188–1688. Stanford University Press. ISBN 978-0804779593.
- Black, Charles (1999). A New Birth of Freedom: Human Rights, Named and Unnamed. New Haven, CN: Yale University Press. ISBN 978-0300077346.
- Blick, Andrew (2015). Beyond Magna Carta: A Constitution for the United Kingdom. Oxford: Bloomsbury. ISBN 978-1-84946-309-6.
- Breay, Claire (2010). Magna Carta: Manuscripts and Myths. London: The British Library. ISBN 978-0712358330.
- Breay, Claire; Harrison, Julian, eds. (2015). Magna Carta: Law, Liberty, Legacy. London: The British Library. ISBN 978-0712357647.
- Browning, Charles Henry (1898). "The Magna Charta Described". The Magna Charta Barons and Their American Descendants with the Pedigrees of the Founders of the Order of Runnemede Deduced from the Sureties for the Enforcement of the Statutes of the Magna Charta of King John. Philadelphia: Porter and Coates. OCLC 9378577.
- Burdett, Francis (1810). Sir Francis Burdett to His Constituents. R. Bradshaw.
- Carpenter, David A. (1990). The Minority of Henry III. Berkeley and Los Angeles: University of California Press. ISBN 978-0413623607.
- Carpenter, David (1996). The Reign of Henry III. London: Hambledon Press. ISBN 978-1852851378.
- Carpenter, David A. (2004). Struggle for Mastery: The Penguin History of Britain 1066–1284. London: Penguin. ISBN 978-0140148244.
- Clanchy, Michael T. (1997). Early Medieval England. The Folio Society.
- Clark, David (2000). "The Icon of Liberty: The Status and Role of Magna Carta in Australian and New Zealand Law". Melbourne University Law Review. 24 (3).
- Cobbett, William; Howell, Thomas Bayly; Howell, Th.J.; Jardine, William (1810). Cobbett's Complete Collection of State Trials and Proceedings for High Treason and Other Crimes and Misdemeanors from the Earliest Period to the Present Time. Bagshaw.
- Crouch, David (1996). William Marshal: Court, Career and Chivalry in the Angevin Empire 1147–1219. Longman. ISBN 978-0582037861.
- Danziger, Danny; Gillingham, John (2004). 1215: The Year of Magna Carta. Hodder Paperbacks. ISBN 978-0340824757.
- Davis, G.R.C. (1963). Magna Carta. The British Library Publishing Division. 1982 edition ISBN 978-0712300148.
- Davis, John Paul (2013). The Gothic King: A Biography of Henry III. London: Peter Owen. ISBN 978-0720614800.
- Drew, Katherine Fischer (2004). Magna Carta. Greenwood Press. ISBN 978-0313325908.
- Edwards, J.G. (1943). "Confirmatio Cartarum and Baronial Grievances in 1297". The English Historical Review. 58 (231): 273–300. doi:10.1093/ehr/lviii.ccxxxi.273. JSTOR 554340.
- Eele, Caroline (2013). Perceptions of Magna Carta: Why has it been seen as significant? (PDF) (Thesis). 2014 Magna Carta 2015 Committee.
- Fryde, Natalie (2001). Why Magna Carta? Angevin England Revisited. Munster, Germany: LiT. ISBN 978-3825856571.
- Fritze, Ronald; Robison, William (2002). Historical Dictionary of Late Medieval England 1272–1485. Greenwood Press. ISBN 978-0313291241.
- Galef, David (1998). Second Thoughts: Focus on Rereading. Detroit, MI: Wayne State University Press. ISBN 978-0814326473.
- Goodman, Ellen (1995). The Origins of the Western Legal Tradition: From Thales to the Tudors. Federation Press. ISBN 978-1862871816.
- Greenberg, Janelle (2006). The Radical Face of the Ancient Constitution: St Edward's 'Laws' in Early Modern Political Thought. Cambridge: Cambridge University Press. ISBN 978-0521024884.
- Hallam, Elizabeth M.; Everard, Judith A. (2001). Capetian France, 987–1328 (2nd ed.). Harlow, UK: Longman. ISBN 978-0582404281.
- Hazeltine, H.D. (1917). "The Influence of Magna Carta on American Constitutional Development". In Malden, Henry Elliot (ed.). Magna Carta commemoration essays. Royal Historical Society. Reprint available ISBN 978-1116447477
- Helmholz, R. H. (2014). "The Myth of Magna Carta Revisited". North Carolina Law Review. 94 (5): 1475–1493.
- Helmholz, R. H. (2016). "Magna Carta and the Law of Nature" (PDF). Loyola Law Review. 62: 869–886.
- Hewit, H.J. (1929). Mediaeval Cheshire. Manchester, UK: Manchester University Press.
- Hill, Christopher (2006). Winstanley 'The Law of Freedom' and Other Writings. Cambridge University Press. ISBN 978-0521031608.
- Hillaby, Joe; Hillaby, Caroline (2013). The Palgrave Dictionary of Medieval Anglo-Jewish History. Palgrave Macmillan. ISBN 978-1137308153.
- Hindley, Geoffrey (1990). The Book of Magna Carta. London: Constable. ISBN 978-0094682405.
- Holt, James C. (1992a). The Northerners: A Study in the Reign of King John. Oxford: Oxford University Press. ISBN 978-0198203094.
- Holt, James C. (1992b). Magna Carta. Cambridge: Cambridge University Press. ISBN 978-0521277785.
- Holt, James C. (2015). Magna Carta (3rd ed.). Cambridge: Cambridge University Press. doi:10.1017/CBO9781316144596. hdl:10023/9444. ISBN 978-1107093164.
- Holt, James C. (2008) [1993]. The Ancient Constitution in Medieval England (PDF). Liberty Fund. ISBN 978-0865977099.
- Howard, A.E. Dick (2008). "Magna Carta Comes To America". Fourscore. 58 (4).
- Huscroft, Richard (2005). Ruling England, 1042–1217. Harlow, UK: Pearson. ISBN 978-0582848825.
- Jobson, Adrian (2012). The First English Revolution: Simon de Montfort, Henry III and the Barons' War. London: Bloomsbury. ISBN 978-1847252265.
- Kennedy, William Paul McClure (1922). The Constitution of Canada. Oxford: Oxford University Press.
- Kewes, Paulina (2006). The Uses of History in Early Modern England. Berkeley: University of California Press. ISBN 978-0873282192.
- Lewis, Suzanne (1987). The Art of Matthew Paris in the Chronica Majora. University of California Press. ISBN 978-0520049819.
- Linebaugh, Peter (2009). The Magna Carta Manifesto: Liberties and Commons for All. Berkeley: University of California Press. ISBN 978-0520260009.
- Mayr-Harting, Henry (2011). Religion, Politics and Society in Britain, 1066–1272. Harlow, UK: Longman. ISBN 978-0582414136.
- McGlynn, Sean (2013). Blood Cries Afar: The Forgotten Invasion of England, 1216. London: Spellmount. ISBN 978-0752488318.
- Menache, Sophia (2003). Clement V. Cambridge: Cambridge University Press. ISBN 978-0521521987.
- Pocock, J.G.A. (1987). The Ancient Constitution and the Feudal Law: A Study of English Historical Thought in the Seventeenth Century. Cambridge: Cambridge University Press. ISBN 978-0521316439.
- Pollard, Albert Frederick (1912). The history of England; a study in political evolution. H. Holt.
- Poole, Austin Lane (1993) [1951]. From Domesday Book to Magna Carta 1087–1216 (2nd ed.). Oxford: Oxford University Press.
- Powicke, F.M. (1929). "The Bull 'Miramur Plurimum' and a Letter to Archbishop Stephen Langton, 5 September 1215". English Historical Review. 44: 87–93. doi:10.1093/ehr/xliv.clxxiii.87.
- Powicke, Frederick Maurice (1963). The Thirteenth Century 1216–1307. Oxford: Oxford University Press. ISBN 978-0198217084
- Prestwich, Michael (1997). Edward I. New Haven, CN: Yale University Press. ISBN 978-0300071573.
- Ridgeway, H. W. (2010) [2004]. "Henry III (1207–1272)". Oxford Dictionary of National Biography (online ed.). Oxford University Press. doi:10.1093/ref:odnb/12950. (Subscription, Wikipedia Library access or UK public library membership required.)
- Radin, Max (1947). "The Myth of Magna Carta". Harvard Law Review. 60 (7): 1060–1091. doi:10.2307/1335742. ISSN 0017-811X. JSTOR 1335742.
- Rothwell, Harry (1975). English Historical Documents 1189–1327. London: Eyre & Spottiswoode. ISBN 978-0413233004.
- Russell, Conrad (1990). Unrevolutionary England, 1603–1642. Continnuum-3PL. ISBN 978-1852850258.
- Scott, Robert McNair (2014). Robert The Bruce: King Of Scots. Canongate Books. ISBN 978-1847677464.
- Simmons, Clare A. (1998). "Absent Presence: The Romantic-Era Magna Charta and the English Constitution". In Shippey, Richard; Utz, Tom (eds.). Medievalism in the Modern World. Essays in Honour of Leslie J. Workman. Brepols Publishers.
- Stimson, Frederick Jessup (2004). The Law Of The Federal And State Constitutions Of The United States. Lawbook Exchange Ltd. ISBN 978-1584773696.
- Tatton-Brown, Tim (July 2015). "Magna Carta at 800: Uncovering its Landscape Archaeology". Current Archaeology (304): 34–37.
- Thompson, Faith (1948). Magna Carta – Its Role In The Making Of The English Constitution 1300–1629. Minneapolis: University of Minnesota Press. ISBN 978-1299948686
- Thomson, Richard (2011) [1829]. "Magna Carta Liberatum (The Great Charter of Liberties) The First Great Charter of King Edward The First Granted October 12th 1297". In Sharples, Barry (ed.). An Historical Essay on the Magna Charta of King John.
- Turner, Ralph V. (2003a). "The Meaning of Magna Carta since 1215". History Today. 53 (9).
- Turner, Ralph (2003b). Magna Carta: Through the Ages. Routledge. ISBN 978-0582438262.
- Turner, Ralph (2009). King John: England's Evil King?. Stroud, UK: History Press. ISBN 978-0752448503.
- "Magna Carta (1297)". UK Government.
- Vincent, Nicholas (2012). Magna Carta: A Very Short Introduction. Oxford: Oxford University Press. ISBN 978-0199582877.
- Vincent, Nicholas (2015). "From World War to World Heritage: Magna Carta in the Twentieth Century". In Vincent, Nicholas (ed.). Magna Carta: The Foundation of Freedom, 1215–2015. London: Third Millennium Publishing. pp. 154–169. ISBN 978-1908990488.
- Warren, W. Lewis (1990). King John. London: Methuen. ISBN 978-0413455208.
- Weiler, Björn K.U. (2012). Henry III of England and the Staufen Empire, 1216–1272. London: Boydell Press for the Royal Historical Society. ISBN 978-0861933198.
- White, Albert Beebe (1915). "The Name Magna Carta". The English Historical Review. XXX (CXIX): 472–475. doi:10.1093/ehr/XXX.CXIX.472.
- White, Albert Beebe (1917). "Note on the Name Magna Carta". The English Historical Review. XXXII (CXXVIII): 545–555. doi:10.1093/ehr/XXXII.CXXVIII.554.
- Woolwrych, Austin Herbert (2003). Smith, David Lee (ed.). Cromwell and Interregnum: The Essential Readings. Wiley-Blackwell. ISBN 978-0631227250.
- Wright, Herbert G. (1919). The Life And Works Of Arthur Hall Of Grantham, Member Of Parliament, Courtier And First Translator Of Homer Into English. Book on Demand.
- Wright, Patrick (1990). The River: A Thames Journey. London: BBC Books. ISBN 978-0563384786.
