= Claire Breay =

English medieval historian

Claire Breay MBE FRHistS
- Born: Mary Claire Breay; 18 October 1968 (age 57)
- Education: Institute of Historical Research
- Occupation: Curator
- Years active: 1998–present
- Employer: British Library
- Notable work: Anglo-Saxon Kingdoms: Art, Word, War

Claire Breay, MBE FRHistS (born 18 October 1968) is an English manuscript curator and medieval historian. She is the Head of Ancient, Medieval and Early Modern Manuscripts at the British Library, where she specializes in Western medieval manuscripts in the Department of Collections.

== Education ==
Breay studied history and classics for her bachelor's degree at Newnham College, Cambridge, after which she proceeded to do a one-year archival work experience post at the Borthwick Institute for Archives in York, and then trained as an archivist at Aberystwyth University. She did a PhD in medieval history at the Institute of Historical Research in London.

== Career ==
Breay started her career as an archivist at Lambeth Palace Library for two years after her PhD. She joined the British Library in 1998 as a curator of medieval historical manuscripts. She became the head of the medieval manuscripts section of the Library in 2006. While working in the section, she was in charge of the Codex Sinaiticus Project (2002–2010). She also worked on the acquisition of the St Cuthbert Gospel (2010–2012) and was a co-investigator for the AHRC-funded Magna Carta Project (2012–2015). Breay was lead curator of the 2018 exhibition, Magna Carta: Law, Liberty, Legacy and also the lead curator of the exhibition, Anglo-Saxon Kingdoms: Art, Word, War which is the largest ever exhibition on the history, literature and culture of Anglo-Saxon kingdoms spanning six centuries – from the eclipse of Roman Britain in the 5th century to the Norman Conquest of 1066, as at the time of the exhibition in October 2018. She jointly supervised an AHRC Collaborative Doctoral Partnership student (2015–2018) with Professor Joanna Story of the University of Leicester. She is a Committee member of the Association for Archives and Manuscripts in Research Collections and the Cathedral Libraries and Archives Association.

== Awards and recognitions ==
In 2017, Breay was awarded an MBE for her services to medieval history.

In 2019, she received the Longman-History Today Trustees' Award for the promotion of history. She was elected a Fellow of the Royal Historical Society in 2024.

== Publications ==
- The Cartulary of Chatteris Abbey. Woodbridge: Boydell. 1999. ISBN 0851157505.
- Magna Carta: Manuscripts and Myths. London: British Library. 2002. ISBN 0712347437.
- Magna Carta. London: British Library. 2007. ISBN 9780712309653.
- Medieval Cartularies of Great Britain (revised ed.). London: British Library. 2010. ISBN 9780712350389.; edited by G. R. C. Davis; revised by Claire Breay, Julian Harrison & David M. Smith
- Magna Carta: Law, Liberty, Legacy. London: British Library. 2015. ISBN 978-0-7123-5764-7.; edited by Claire Breay & Julian Harrison
- The St Cuthbert Gospel: Studies on the Insular Manuscript of the Gospel of John. London: British Library. 2015. ISBN 978-0-7123-5765-4.; edited by Claire Breay & Bernard Meehan
- Anglo-Saxon Kingdoms: Art, Word, War. London: British Library. 2018. ISBN 9780712352079.; edited by Claire Breay & Joanna Story
