= Linaker =

Linaker is a surname. Notable people with the surname include:

- Hugh Linaker (1872–1938), gardener and landscape gardener
- Johnny Linaker (1927–2013), English footballer
- Kay Linaker (1913–2008), American actress and screenwriter
- Lewis Linaker (1885–1961), English cricketer

== See also ==
- Lineker
