= Linacre (surname) =

Linacre is a surname. Over time, the name has been spelt a variety of different ways including: Linaker, Lineker, Linneker, Liniker, Linnecar, Leneker, Linnegar, Lineker, Lynaker, Lynacre, Lynneker and Lenniker. As of about 2016, 411 people bore one or another variant of this surname in Great Britain and 6 in Ireland; in 1881, 155 people in Great Britain bore one.

== Etymology ==
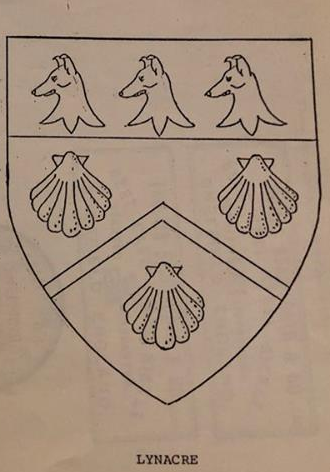
Lynacre Coat of Arms

The surname is of medieval English origin. It originated as a locative name, given to people from places called Linacre. Such place-names in turn derive from Middle English līn ('flax') and aker ('field'), thus denoting places associated with a flax-field.

The name is first attested in the Domesday Book of 1086, which mentions a Cambridgeshire landholder named Godwin de Linacra.

The Linacre family was also prominent in the villages of Hackenthorpe and Eckington in Derbyshire in the 13th and 14th centuries. By 1881, within Great Britain, the name was mostly concentrated in Derbyshire, Lancashire, and the West Riding of Yorkshire.

== People ==
People that bear the surname include:

- Billy Linacre (1924–2010), English footballer
- Sir Gordon Linacre (1920–2015), Royal Air Force officer, afterwards journalist and press baron
- Harry Linacre (1880–1957), English footballer
- John Linacre (born 1955), English footballer
- Thomas Linacre (c.1460–1524), English humanist scholar

== See also ==
- Lineker
