= William Tilly =

William Tilly might refer to:

- William Tilly of Selling, or William Celling (died 1494), English cleric
- William Tilly (1860–1935), Australian elocutionist who became prolific in the United States; see Good American Speech
