= Linacre =

Linacre is a word deriving from Middle English līn ('flax') and aker ('field'), thus originally denoting places associated with a flax-field. It may refer to:

- Linacre (surname), including a list of people with the name
- Linacre College, Oxford, a postgraduate college of Oxford University
- The Linacre Quarterly, the official journal of the Catholic Medical Association
- Linacre, an area west of Chesterfield, Derbyshire, England
- Linacre, the central area of Bootle (formerly known as Bootle-cum-Linacre), Merseyside, England
- Linacre (ward), an electoral ward of the Sefton Metropolitan Borough Council, Merseyside, England
