= Linacre (ward) =

Area of Bootle, England

Coordinates: 53.4512°N 2.9975°W

Linacre is a Metropolitan Borough of Sefton ward in the Bootle Parliamentary constituency. It covers the area of Bootle historically known as Linacre, including Bootle town centre, the New Strand Shopping Centre, and Gladstone Dock. According to the 2021 census, the ward had a population of 13,601. From the 2026 United Kingdom local elections, the ward will be renamed Bootle West, following minor boundary changes.

== Etymology ==
The name Linacre derives from Middle English līn ('flax') and aker ('field'), thus once denoting a place associated with a flax-field.

== Election results ==
=== Elections of the 2020s ===
Sefton Metropolitan Borough Council Municipal Elections 2024: Linacre
Party	Candidate	Votes	%	±%
Labour	Joanne Williams	1402	86%	
Liberal Democrats	David Charles Mellalieu	134	8%	
Conservative	Graham Campbell	103	6%	
Majority				
Turnout		1639	18%	
Labour hold		Swing		

Sefton Metropolitan Borough Council Municipal Elections 2023: Linacre
Party	Candidate	Votes	%	±%
Labour	John Fairclough	1166	76%	
Green	Lily Davies	139	9%	
Independent	John Philip Rice	138	9%	
Conservative	Anne Clegg	91	6%	
Majority				
Turnout		1534	17%	
Labour hold		Swing		

=== Elections of the 2010s ===
Sefton Metropolitan Borough Council Municipal Elections 2011: Linacre
Party	Candidate	Votes	%	±%
Labour	John Fairclough	1758	82%	
UKIP	Robin-Micheal Thompson	191	9%	
Liberal Democrats	Colin Anderson	110	5%	
Conservative	Thomas James Moylan	93	4%	
Majority				
Turnout		2152	28%	
Labour hold		Swing		

Sefton Metropolitan Borough Council Municipal Elections 2010: Linacre
Party	Candidate	Votes	%	±%
Labour	Gordon Friel	2699	69%	
Liberal Democrats	Eileen Elizabeth Smith	543	14%	
UKIP	Paul Andrew Nuttall	457	12%	
Conservative	Alistair McNeill	211	5%	
Majority				
Turnout		3910	49%	
Labour hold		Swing		
