= Lineker =

Lineker is a surname of medieval English origin, a variant spelling of the name found also as Linacre, Linaker, Linneker, Liniker, Linnecor, Linnecar, Linegar and Linnegar. As of about 2016, 411 people bore one or another variant of this surname in Great Britain and 6 in Ireland; in 1881, 155 people in Great Britain bore one.

== Etymology ==
The surname originated as be a locative name, given to people from places whose names are now generally spelled Linacre. Such place-names in turn derive from Middle English līn ('flax') and aker ('field'), thus denoting places associated with a flax-field. The name is first attested in the Domesday Book of 1086, which mentions a Cambridgeshire man named Godwin de Linacra.

== Notable people ==
Notable people with the surname include:

- Danielle Bux (born 1979), formerly Danielle Lineker, Welsh model, ex-wife of Gary Lineker
- Gary Lineker (born 1960), English former footballer
- John Lineker (born 1990), Brazilian mixed martial artist
- Matt Lineker (born 1985), English cricketer

== See also ==
- Linacre (surname)
- Liniker, a Brazilian singer-songwriter, born 1995
