= John Noble Johnson =

English physician (1787–1823)

- Born: 1787
- Died: 6 October 1823 (aged 35–36)
- Occupation: Physician

John Noble Johnson (1787 – 6 October 1823) was an English physician and biographer of Thomas Linacre.

== Biography ==
Johnson was the son of John Johnson, physician, of Aylesbury, entered at Magdalen Hall, Oxford, on 23 May 1803, aged 16 (Foster, Alumni Oxonienses). He graduated B.A. 1807, M.A. 1810, M.B. 1811, and M.D. 1814. He became a fellow of the Royal College of Physicians in 1815, and was Gulstonian lecturer at the college in 1816. In 1818 he was elected physician to the Westminster Hospital, but resigned his office in 1822, and died on 6 October 1823 at the Albany, London. Before his death he had completed an admirable ‘Life of Thomas Linacre’, founder of the College of Physicians, with memoirs of his contemporaries. It was published in 1835; edited by Robert Graves, barrister-at-law.
