= Catholic Medical Association (United Kingdom) =

The Catholic Medical Association is a British organisation of Catholic healthcare workers. It was founded in 1911 as the "Guild of Saints Cosmas and Damian".

It publishes the Catholic Medical Quarterly, an open access medical journal. This has its origins in the "Catholic Medical Gazette", two editions of which were published in 1914 and 1920. The "Catholic Medical Guardian" was published quarterly from 1923 to 1941. The Catholic Medical Quarterly has been published quarterly since 1947.

== See also ==
- Catholic Medical Association (United States and Canada)
