= Lewis Linaker =

English cricketer

Lewis Linaker (8 April 1885 – 17 November 1961) was an English first-class cricketer, who played one match for Yorkshire County Cricket Club against Cambridge University in 1909.

Born in Paddock, Huddersfield, Yorkshire, England, Linaker was a left arm medium fast bowler, who took the wicket of John Nason, hit wicket, for 75 in Cambridge's first innings. He bowled eight overs in all, conceding 28 runs. He was less fortunate in his two innings, batting right-handed he was caught Buchanan bowled Olivier for a duck, batting at number 10, in Yorkshire's first innings, and then stumped Tufnell bowled Bruce-Lockhart, to complete his pair, in the second.

Linaker played for Primrose Hill C.C. for many years.

He died in November 1961 in Paddock, Huddersfield.
