= Nonsuch House =

House on London Bridge; earliest documented example of a prefabricated building

Coordinates: 51.5075°N 0.0871°W

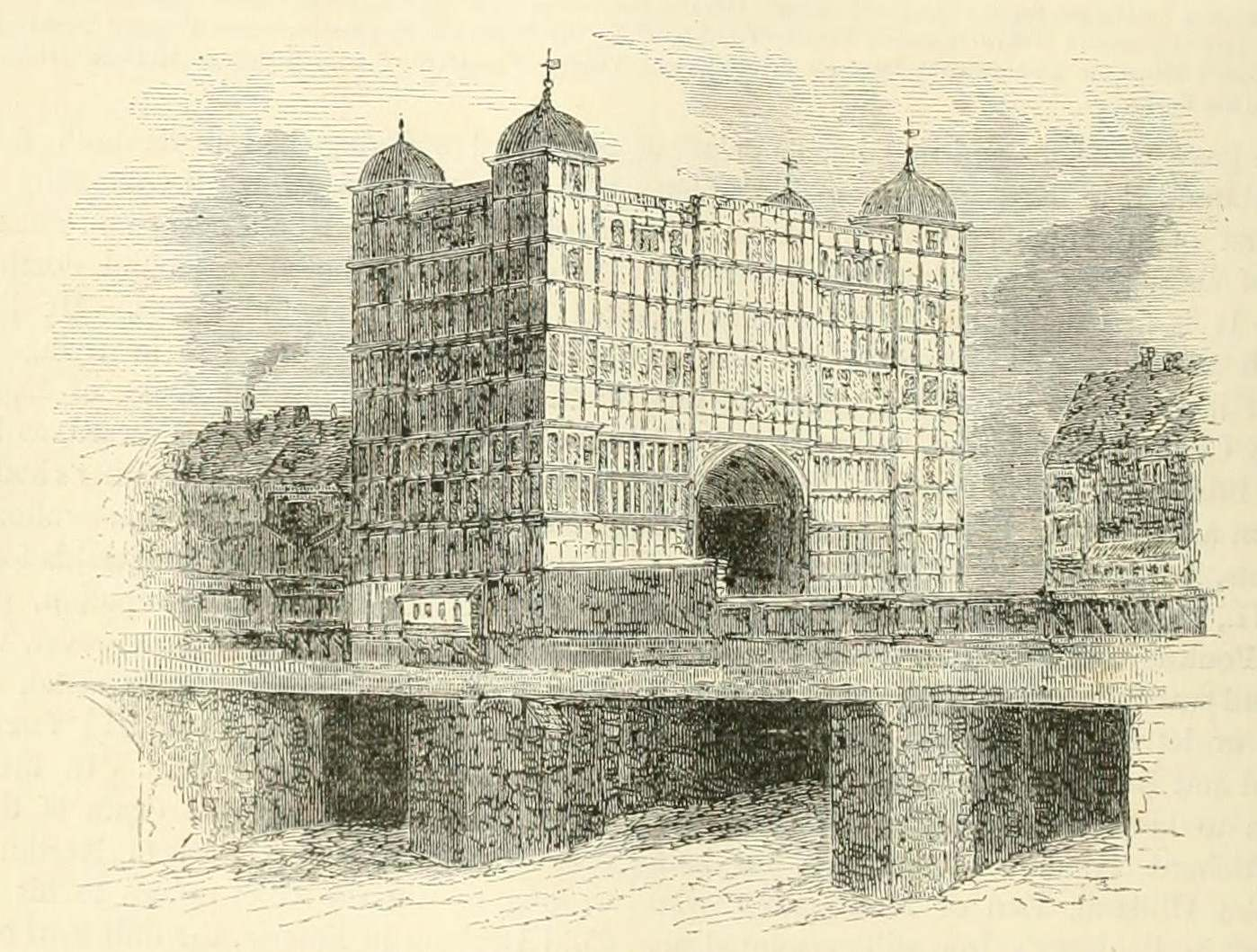
Depiction of Nonsuch House in Old and New London, Illustrated (1873)

Nonsuch House was a four-storey house on London Bridge, completed in 1579. It is the earliest documented prefabricated building. Originally constructed in the Netherlands, it was taken apart and shipped to London in pieces in 1578, where it was reassembled, with each timber being marked so that it could be reconstructed correctly. The name Nonsuch may have referred to Henry VIII's now vanished Nonsuch Palace outside London; it meant there was "none such" anywhere else, that it was an unequalled paragon of its kind.

All houses on London Bridge were pulled down in 1757.

== Description ==
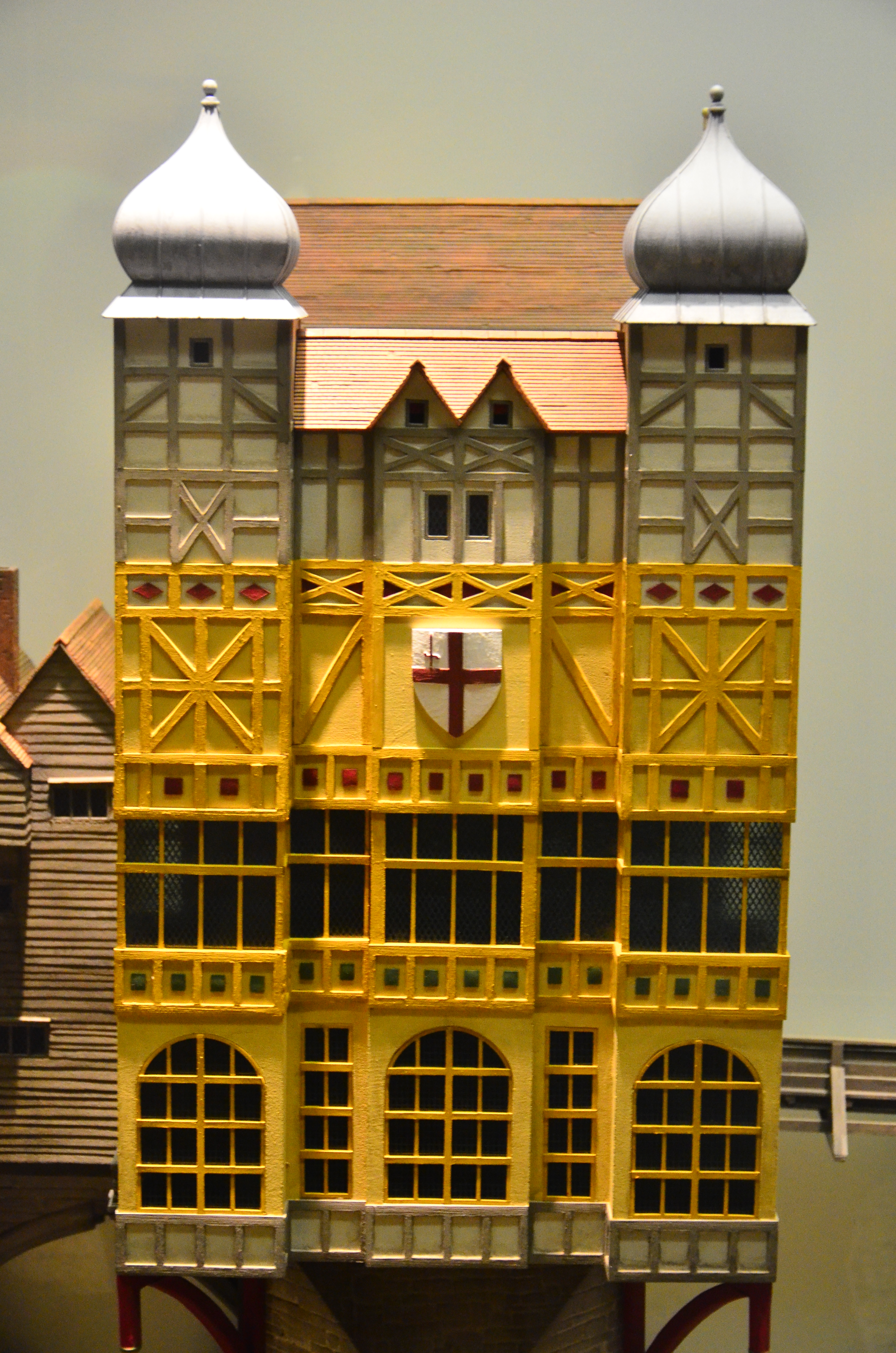
A model of the house at Docklands Museum at London.

Nonsuch House's archway straddled the bridge. The house was in the centre of the bridge with its principal front facing towards the Southwark end, the principal approach to the city of London from the south. Occupying the place of an entrance to the city, it was elaborately carved with ornate decorations on its east and west Dutch stepped gables, which protruded beyond the sides of the bridge. The house was about 27 feet (8.2 m) wide with a usable floor 20 feet (6.1 m) wide in the middle.

Nonsuch House had two fronts to the River Thames with large columns, windows and outside carvings. The square towers at each of its four corners were crowned with onion domes. The house had two sundials on top on the south side. On one of them was painted the adage "Time and tide stay for no man". The northern front of the building was attached to other buildings on the bridge. The southern front was not connected to any other buildings and had a clear area extending 56 feet (17 m) in front. This side contained numerous transom casement windows.
