= Catholic Medical Association =

North American medical organization

- Abbreviation: CMA
- Formation: 1932; 94 years ago
- Founded at: New York City, New York, US
- Legal status: 501(c)(3) organization
- Headquarters: Fort Washington, Pennsylvania, US
- Region served: United States; Canada
- Official language: English
- President: Michael S. Parker
- Executive director: Mario R. Dickerson
- Publication: The Linacre Quarterly
- Affiliations: Alliance for Hippocratic Medicine; International Federation of Catholic Medical Associations
- Revenue: US$1.6 million (2019)
- Expenses: US$1.6 million (2019)
- Website: cathmed.org
- Formerly called: National Federation of Catholic Physicians Guilds

The Catholic Medical Association (CMA) is an organization of Catholic physicians, dentists, and health care professionals. This article refers to the organisation operating in the United States and Canada. As of 2004, it had about 900 members. Until 1997, it was known as the National Federation of Catholic Physicians Guilds. The Catholic Medical Association is also the name of an older sister organisation based in the United Kingdom, and which has existed (under various names) since 1911.

== Description ==
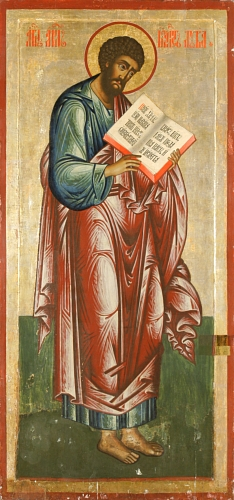
18th-century icon of Luke the Evangelist, patron saint of physicians

The organization studies and holds conferences on topics that relate to spirituality and health. For instance, the theme of the 74th annual meeting in 2005 was "The Biological and Spiritual Development of the Child", and was attended by physicians from 43 US states and Canada, as well as a number of theologians. Another example of the interleaving of religion and medicine that permeates the organization was the 2008 White Mass for healthcare professionals, held on the feast of Saint Luke, the patron saint of physicians.

The organization started around 1932 as local guilds of physicians meeting in various dioceses and then became the International Federation of Catholic Medical Associations, based in Rome. It eventually became the Catholic Medical Association. It publishes a journal of medical ethics, The Linacre Quarterly.

The organization continues to comment on current policies of the United States Department of Health and Human Services. The organization opposes euthanasia. The use of human cloning experiments is also opposed by the organization. The organization is a supporter of the "Rules of Conscience" in medical practice. The Catholic Medical Association also sponsors specific studies, for example, on the prevention of sexual abuse of children. It takes the disproven position that homosexuality is not "inborn" and is a condition that is both preventable and treatable. They also oppose "gender ideology" and gender-affirming care, citing research from conservative and anti-trans groups such the American College of Pediatricians, Independent Women's Forum and the Society for Evidence-Based Gender Medicine.

The organization has affiliates in various parts of the United States and is recognized and its policies are supported by the US Conference of Catholic Bishops On some legal and ethical issues, the organization cooperates with other Christian organizations such as the Christian Medical Association. Along with the Christian Medical & Dental Associations, American College of Pediatricians, and American Association of Pro-Life Obstetricians and Gynecologists, the Catholic Medical Association is represented in the Alliance for Hippocratic Medicine.

The Catholic Medical Students Association is an association of medical students in the United States, operating in conjunction with the Catholic Medical Association and has some regional branches.

== See also ==
- Christian Medical and Dental Associations
- Mass in the Catholic Church § White Mass
