= William Celling =

William Celling (or William Tilly of Selling) (died 1494) was an English Benedictine prior (or abbot), diplomat, and humanist scholar.

== Life ==
He derived his name, according to John Leland, from the village of Celling, or Selling, some two miles from Faversham in Kent: Edward Hasted assigns him to a family settled at Selling near Hythe. He appears to have been a monk of Christ Church, Canterbury; thence he proceeded to the University of Oxford, where he became a member of the newly founded All Souls College.

He was elected prior of Christ Church, Canterbury, on 10 September 1472. It was presumably subsequent to this that he made his first journey to Italy: Leland states that Celling became acquainted with Politian (born in 1454). While abroad Celling collected Latin and Greek manuscripts, and when he returned to England brought these with him. Among other works were a copy of Cicero's Republic, of St. Cyril's and St. Basil's Commentaries on the Prophets; and the works of Synesius are specially mentioned. For his manuscripts he restored the library over the prior's chapel, but many of his books were destroyed some quarter of a century later in a fire.

Celling was a careful manager, clearing the priory of debt and undertaking building work. He charged himself with the education of Thomas Linacre, who is said to have been his pupil at Canterbury, and who certainly accompanied him on his second journey to Italy, an embassy to Rome between 1485 and 1490. In 1490 and 1491 Celling was occupied with Richard Foxe, at that time the bishop of Exeter, in the negotiations between England, France, and Brittany. Some three years later he died on 10 December 1494. He was buried in the martyrium of Thomas Becket, in a richly blazoned tomb, on which was inscribed a long epitaph narrating his embassies to France and Rome.

== Notes ==
Attribution

This article incorporates text from a publication now in the public domain: "Celling, William". Dictionary of National Biography. London: Smith, Elder & Co. 1885–1900.
