= The Linacre Quarterly =

- Discipline: Medical ethics
- Language: English
- Edited by: William V. Williams

Publication details
- History: 1932–present
- Publisher: SAGE Publishing on behalf of the Catholic Medical Association
- Frequency: Quarterly

Standard abbreviations
- ISO 4: Linacre Q.

Indexing
- ISSN: 0024-3639 (print); 2050-8549 (web)
- LCCN: 68003045
- OCLC no.: 268995630

Links
- Journal homepage; Journal at SAGE Journals

The Linacre Quarterly is a peer-reviewed academic journal that was established in 1932. It is the official journal of the Catholic Medical Association (United States) and primarily focuses on the relationship between medicine and spirituality, and in particular on medical ethics. The journal is named after Thomas Linacre, the English physician and Catholic priest, who founded the Royal College of Physicians. Starting in 2013, it was published by Maney Publishing on behalf of the Catholic Medical Association. Maney was acquired by Taylor & Francis in 2015; SAGE Publishing became the publisher in 2018.

The journal is abstracted and indexed in the Philosopher's Index and in the Catholic Periodical and Literature Index.

== Editors Emeritus ==
????-201? Deacon William V. Williams, MD

2005-???? Eugene Diamond, M.D.

1969-2004 John P. Mullooly, M.D.

1932-???? Anthony Bassler
