= Thomas Linacre =

English humanist scholar and physician (c.1460–1524)

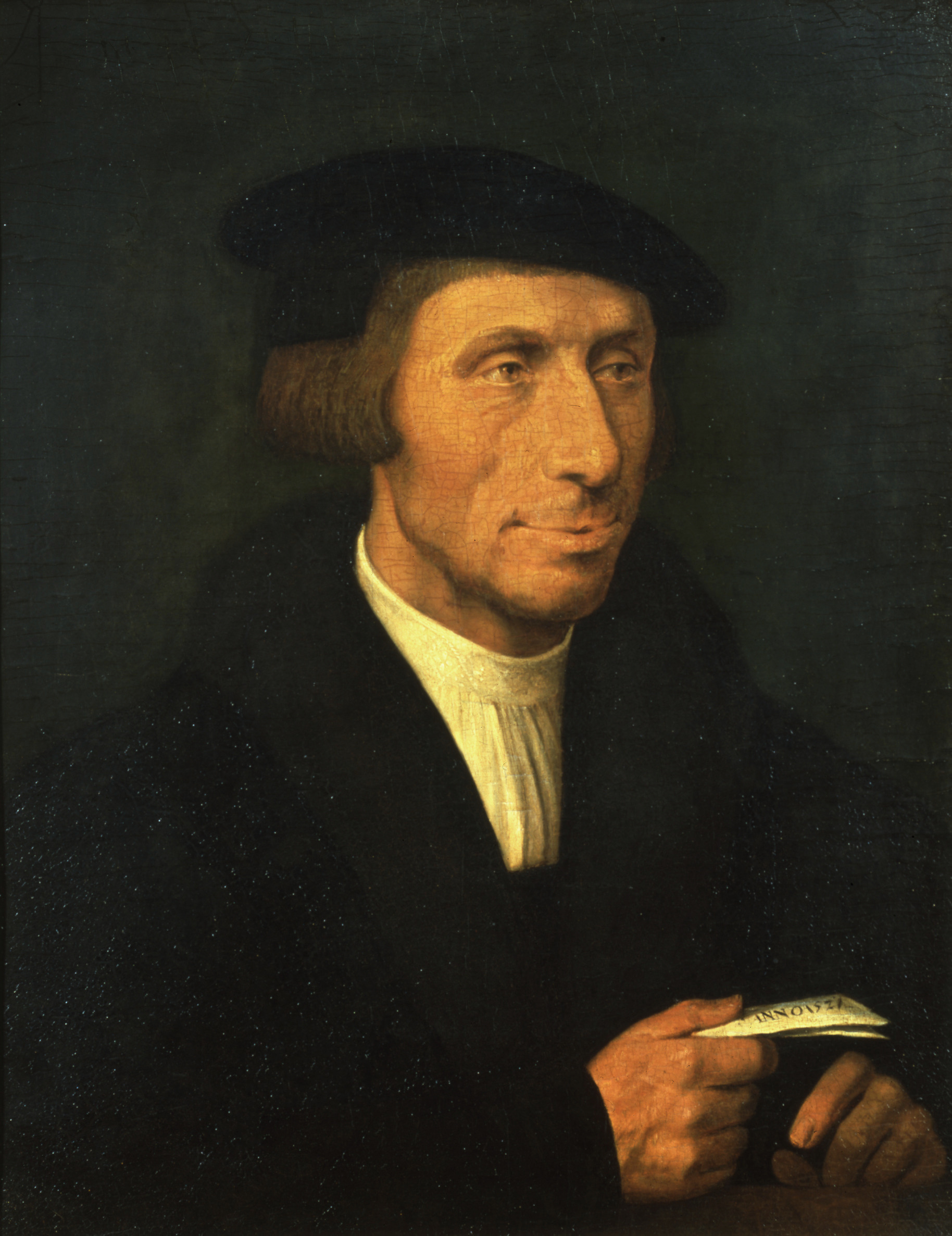
- A likely portrait of Thomas Linacre
- Born: c. 1460; Brampton, Chesterfield, Derbyshire, England
- Died: 20 October 1524 (aged 63–64)
- Other name: Lynaker
- Citizenship: Kingdom of England
- Education: University of Oxford
- Occupations: humanist scholar, physician, clergyman

Thomas Linacre or Lynaker (/ˈlɪnəkər/ LIN-ə-kər; c. 1460 – 20 October 1524) was an English humanist scholar, Catholic priest, and physician, after whom Linacre College, Oxford, and Linacre House, a boys' boarding house at The King's School, Canterbury, were named.

Linacre was more of a scholar than a scientific investigator. It is difficult to judge his practical skill in his profession, but it was highly esteemed in his own day. He took no part in political or theological questions, but his career as a scholar was characteristic of the critical period in the history of learning through which he lived.

He was one of the first Englishmen to study Greek in Italy, and brought back to England and the University of Oxford the lessons of the "New Learning." His teachers were some of the greatest scholars of the day. Among his pupils was one—Erasmus—whose name alone would suffice to preserve the memory of his instructor in Greek, and others of note in letters and politics, such as Sir Thomas More, Prince Arthur, and Queen Mary I of England. John Colet, William Grocyn, William Lilye, and other eminent scholars were his close friends, and he was esteemed by a still wider circle of literary correspondents in all parts of Europe.

== Life ==
Linacre was born at Brampton, Chesterfield, in Derbyshire, descended from an ancient family, recorded in the Domesday Book. He received his early education at the Canterbury Cathedral school, under the direction of William Tilly of Selling, who became prior of Canterbury in 1472. It was from Selling that Linacre must have received his first incentive to study Classics. Linacre entered Oxford in about 1480, and in 1484 was elected a fellow of All Souls College. Shortly afterwards he visited Italy in the train of Selling, who was sent by King Henry VII as an envoy to the papal court. Linacre accompanied his patron as far as Bologna. There he became the pupil of Angelo Poliziano, and shared the instruction that Poliziano imparted at Florence to the sons of Lorenzo de Medici. The younger of these princes became Pope Leo X and later remembered his old companionship with Linacre.

Among his other teachers and friends in Italy were Demetrius Chalcondylas, Hermolaus Barbarus, Aldus Romanus the printer of Venice (of whose New Academy Linacre was a member), and Nicolaus Leonicenus of Vicenza. Linacre took the degree of doctor of medicine with great distinction at Padua.

On his return to Oxford, full of learning and imbued with the spirit of the Italian Renaissance, he formed one of the brilliant circle of Oxford scholars, including John Colet, William Grocyn, and William Latimer, who are mentioned in the letters of Erasmus.

Linacre does not appear to have practised or taught medicine in Oxford. In about 1501 he was called to court as tutor of the young Arthur, Prince of Wales. On the accession of Henry VIII in 1509, he was appointed as Physician to the King, an office at that time of considerable influence and importance, and practised medicine in London, having among his patients most of the great statesmen and prelates of the time, including Cardinal Wolsey, Archbishop William Warham, and Bishop Fox.

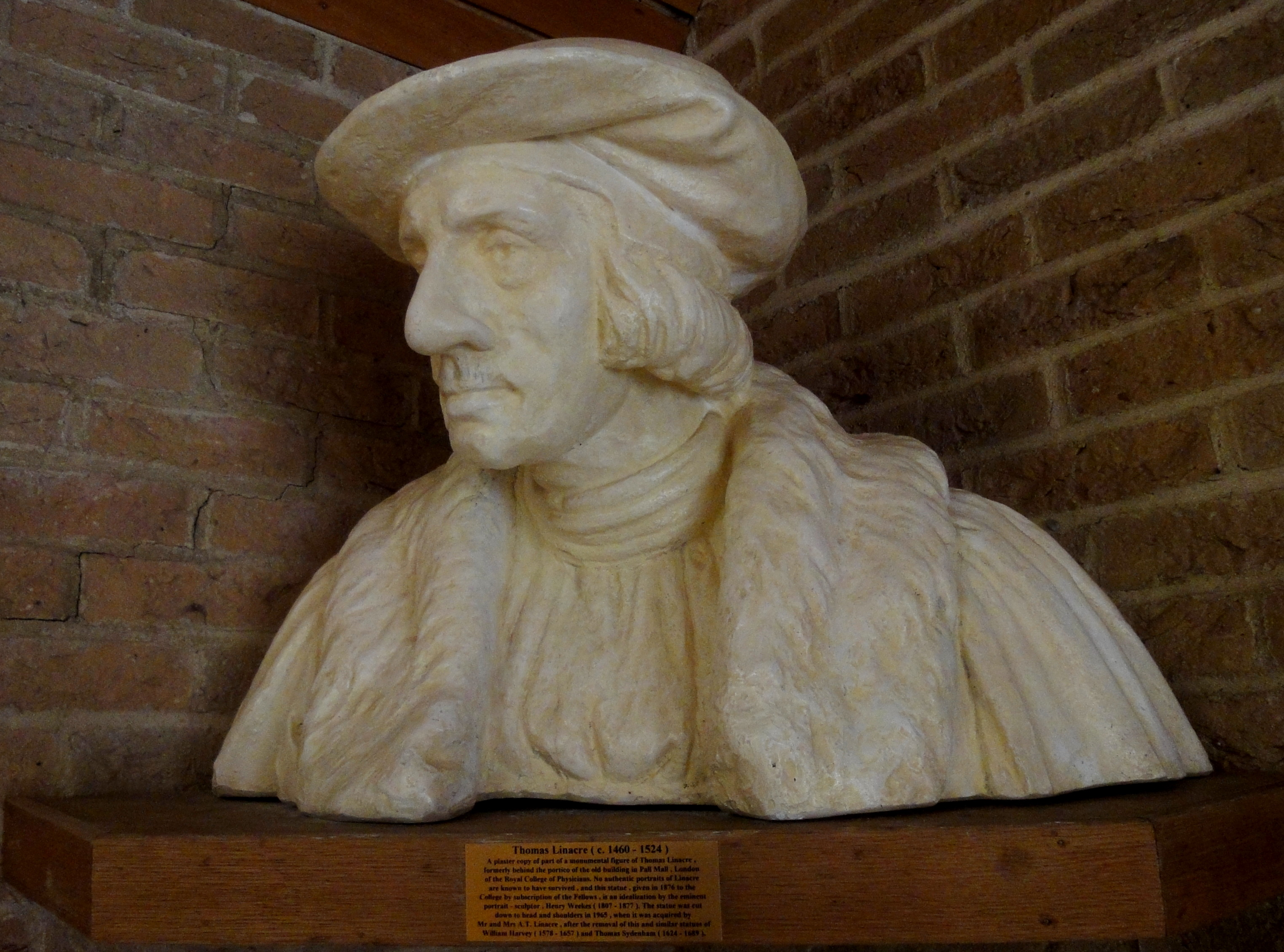
The bust of Thomas Linacre, in the Dining Hall of Linacre College, Oxford

After some years of professional activity, Linacre devoted himself to the study of theology and the duties of the priesthood. In around 1509, he received priest's orders as the rector of Merstham, Kent. Numerous ecclesiastical positions followed, and he finally obtained the rectorship of Wigan in 1520, which he held until his death in 1524. His clerical benefices included the Precentorship of York Minster. His ordination was connected with his retirement from active life. Literary labours and the cares of the foundation that owed its existence chiefly to him, the Royal College of Physicians, occupied Linacre's remaining years.

The most important service Linacre conferred on his own profession and science was the foundation by royal charter of the College of Physicians in London, and he was the first President of the new college, which he further aided by bequeathing to it his own house and library. Shortly before his death, Linacre obtained from the king letters patent for the establishment of readerships in medicine at Oxford and Cambridge, and placed valuable estates in the hands of trustees for their endowment. Two readerships were founded at Merton College, Oxford, and a lectureship at St John's College, Cambridge. The Oxford foundation was revived by the university commissioners in 1856 in the form of the Linacre professorship of anatomy. At St John's College the funds are still in use today; since 1989 the college has hosted an annual "Linacre Lecture" on a subject in medicine, delivered by a leading research scientist in their field.

A modern monument in the crypt of St Paul's Cathedral in London lists Linacre's grave as one of the important lost in the Great Fire of London in 1666. His epitaph in Old St Paul's Cathedral was recorded by Paul Hentzner and translated by Robert Naunton as reading:

Virtue survives the funeral.

To the memory of Thomas Linacre, an eminent physician, John Caius placed this monument.

On the lower part of it is this inscription in gold letters:

Thomas Linacre, physician to King Henry VIII., a man learned in the Greek and Latin languages, and particularly skilful in physick, by which he restored many from a state of languishment and despair to life. He translated with extraordinary eloquence many of Galen's works into Latin; and published, a little before his death, at the request of his friends, a very valuable book on the correct structure of the Latin tongue. He founded in perpetuity in favour of students in physick, two public lectures at Oxford, and one at Cambridge. In this city he brought about, by his own industry, the establishing of a College of Physicians, of which he was elected the first president. He was a detester of all fraud and deceit, and faithful in his friendships; equally dear to men of all ranks: he went into orders a few years before his death, and quitted this life full of years, and much lamented, A.D. 1524, on the 29th of October.

== Works ==
Linacre's literary activity was displayed in both pure scholarship and translation from Greek. In the domain of scholarship he was known by the rudiments of (Latin) grammar (Progymnasmata Grammatices vulgaria), composed in English, a revised version of which was made for the use of the Princess Mary, and afterwards translated into Latin by George Buchanan. He also wrote a work on Latin composition, De emendata structura Latini sermonis ("On the Pure and Correct Structure of Latin Prose"), which was published in London in 1524 and reprinted many times on the continent of Europe.

Linacre's only medical works were his translations. He wanted to make the works of Galen (and indeed those of Aristotle also) accessible to all readers of Latin. What he effected in the case of the first, though not trifling in itself, is inconsiderable compared with the whole mass of Galen's writings; and of his translations from Aristotle, some of which are known to have been completed, nothing has survived. The following are the works of Galen translated by Linacre:

1. De sanitate tuenda (Paris, 1517)
2. Methodus medendi (Paris, 1519)
3. De temperamentis et de inaequali intemperie (Cambridge, 1521)
4. De naturalibus facultatibus (London, 1523)
5. De symptomatum differentiis et causis (London, 1524)
6. De pulsuum usu (London, without date).

He also translated, for the use of Prince Arthur, an astronomical treatise of Proclus, De sphaera, which was printed at Venice by Aldus in 1499. The accuracy of these translations and their elegance of style were universally admitted. They were generally accepted as the standard versions of those parts of Galen's writings, and frequently reprinted, either as parts of the collected works or separately.

Linacre's intellectual fastidiousness and minute accuracy were, as Erasmus suggested, the chief reason for his having left no more permanent literary memorials. It is difficult to justify, by any extant work, the extremely high reputation that he enjoyed among the scholars of his time. His Latin style was greatly admired by Erasmus, who also praised Linacre's critical judgment ("vir non-exacti tantum sed severi judicii"). According to others it was hard to say whether he was more distinguished as a grammarian or a rhetorician. Of Greek he was regarded a consummate master; and he was equally eminent as a "philosopher", that is, learned in the works of the ancient philosophers and naturalists. In this there may have been some exaggeration; but all have acknowledged the elevation of Linacre's character, and the fine moral qualities summed up in the epitaph written by John Caius: "Fraudes dolosque mire perosus; fidus amicis; omnibus ordinibus juxta carus" ("An enemy of deceit; a loyal friend; equally loved by men of all classes).

== Authorities ==
The materials for Linacre's biography are to a large extent contained in the older biographical collections of George Lily (in Paulus Jovius, Descriptio Britanniae), John Bale, John Leland, and Pits, in Anthony Wood's Athenae Oxonienses, and in the Biographia Britannica. All are completely collected in the Life of Thomas Linacre by John Noble Johnson (London, 1835). See also William Munk's Roll of the Royal College of Physicians (2nd edition, London, 1878); and the Introduction, by Joseph Frank Payne, to a facsimile reproduction of Linacre's version of Galen de temperamentis (Cambridge, 1881).

== See also ==
- List of Erasmus's correspondents
- Linacre Quarterly
- List of Roman Catholic scientist-clerics
