= Timeline of London =

The following is a timeline of the history of London, the capital of England and the United Kingdom.

== Prehistory ==
- 120,000 BC – Elephants and hippopotami are roaming on the site of Trafalgar Square.
- 6000 BC – Hunter-gatherers are on the site of Heathrow Terminal 5.
- 4000 BC – Mesolithic timber structure exists on the River Thames foreshore, south of the site of Vauxhall Bridge.
- 3800 BC – Stanwell Cursus is constructed.
- 2300–1500 BC – Possible community on Chiswick Eyot in the Thames.
- 1500 BC – A Bronze Age bridge exists from the foreshore north of Vauxhall Bridge. This bridge either crosses the Thames, or goes to a subsequently lost island in the river.
- 300–1 BC – An Iron Age oppidum in Woolwich, which is possibly London's first port, in the late-Roman period reused as a fort.

== Early history to the 10th century ==
- 47 AD – Original settlement of Londinium founded by the Romans.
- 50
  - The original London bridge is constructed out of wood.
  - Grim's Ditch (Harrow) is dug from this year onwards.
- 57 – 8 January: The earliest known handwritten document in the UK is created in London, a financial record in one of the Roman 'Bloomberg tablets' found during 2010–13 on the site of Londinium. Another dated to 65/70-80 AD gives the earliest known written record of the name of Londinium.
- 60 or 61 – Londinium is sacked by forces of Boudica.
- 122 – Construction of a forum in Londinium is completed; Emperor Hadrian visits. There is a major fire in the city at about this time.
- c. 190–225 – The London Wall is constructed.
- During 3rd century - London's population is around 50,000 due to the influence of its major port.
- c. 214 – London becomes the capital of the province of Britannia Superior.
- c. 240 – The London Mithraeum is built.
- c. 250 – Coasting barge "Blackfriars I" sinks in the Thames at Blackfriars.
- 255 – Work begins on a riverside wall in London.
- 296 – Constantius Chlorus occupies Londinium, saving it from attack by mercenary Franks.
- 368 – The city is known as Augusta by this date, indicating that it is a Roman provincial capital.
- 490 – Saxons are in power, and the Roman city is largely abandoned.
- By early 7th century – Settlement at Lundenwic (modern-day Aldwych).
- c. 604 – Mellitus is the first Bishop of London in the modern succession to be consecrated.
- 650 – A market is active.
- 675
  - An early fire of London destroys the wooden Anglo-Saxon cathedral, which is rebuilt in stone over the following decade.
  - The Church of All Hallows-by-the-Tower is founded in the City by Barking Abbey.
- By 757 – London has come under the control of Æthelbald of Mercia and passes to Offa, who has a mint here.
- 798 – An early fire of London takes place.
- 838 – Kingston upon Thames is first mentioned.
- 842 – London is raided by Vikings with "great slaughter"; they besiege it in 851.
- 871 – Autumn: Danes take up winter quarters in Mercian London.
- 886
  - King Alfred the Great restores London to Mercia.
  - The London Mint is established.
- 893 – Spring: Edward, son of Alfred the Great, forces invading Danish Vikings to take refuge on Thorney Island.
- 911 – Edward the Elder, King of Wessex, transfers London from Mercia to Wessex.
- 918 – Ælfthryth, Countess of Flanders and daughter of King Alfred, donates Kentish lands, including Lewisham, Greenwich and Woolwich, to St. Peter's Abbey in Ghent.
- 925 – 4 September: Coronation of Æthelstan as King of Wessex at Kingston upon Thames.
- 978 – The coronation of Æthelred as King of the English takes place in Kingston upon Thames.
- 982 – An early fire of London takes place.
- 989 – An early fire of London burns from Aldgate to Ludgate.

== The 11th to 15th centuries ==
- 1009 – August: Vikings attack London.
- 1014?
  - Olaf II Haraldsson of Norway perhaps attacks London and burns the wooden London Bridge in support of Æthelred.
  - The origin of Borough Market is claimed.
- 1016
  - 7 May: Cnut the Great lays siege to London.
  - July?: Cnut lays siege to London a second time.
  - Between July and October: Battle of Brentford: King Edmund Ironside defeats Cnut, who then besieges London a third time.
- 1065 – 28 December: Westminster Abbey is consecrated.
- 1066
  - 6 January: Harold Godwinson is crowned as the King of England, probably in the new Westminster Abbey.
  - Mid-October: William the Conqueror burns Southwark while attempting to capture London Bridge.
  - 25 December: William the Conqueror is crowned as the King of England in Westminster Abbey.
- 1067 – The City of London is granted a royal charter by William the Conqueror guaranteeing the same rights as it enjoyed in the reign of Edward the Confessor.
- Around 1078 – Construction of the White Tower (Tower of London) begins; it is probably largely completed by 1088.
- 1087 – An early fire of London destroys much of the city, including the St Paul's Cathedral.
- 1091 – 17 October: The London tornado of 1091 destroys the wooden London Bridge and severely damages the church of St Mary-le-Bow and other buildings.
- 1099 – Westminster Hall is completed.
- 1100
  - 5 August: The coronation of Henry I takes place at Westminster Abbey by Maurice (bishop of London).
  - 15 August: Ranulf Flambard, Bishop of Durham, becomes the first person imprisoned in the Tower of London, by the new king for supposed embezzlement. On 3 February 1101, he becomes the first person to escape from the Tower.
- 1106 – Southwark Priory is refounded by the Augustinians.
- 1109 – Kingston upon Thames is first chartered.
- 1114 – Merton Priory is established.
- 1123 – St Bartholomew's Hospital, St Bartholomew-the-Great priory and Smithfield meat market are established.
- 1127 – A royal charter creates the Liberty of the Clink in the Borough of Southwark.
- 1133 – A royal charter establishes the first annual Bartholomew Fair at Smithfield, which is later to become England's largest cloth fair.
- 1135 – 26 May (Pentecost): The Great Fire of 1135 destroys the wooden London Bridge and seriously damages St Paul's Cathedral.
- 1141 – July: The Anarchy: Matilda I of Boulogne, wife of the imprisoned King Stephen, recaptures London.
- By 1144 – Winchester Palace is completed in Southwark.
- 1147 – The Royal Hospital and Collegiate Church of St Katharine by the Tower is founded by Queen Matilda.
- 1155 – The Worshipful Company of Weavers (established by 1130) is chartered.
- 1163 – The new wooden London Bridge is built, with the construction of the first stone-built structure beginning in 1176.
- 1180 – The Guild of Pepperers, predecessor of the Worshipful Company of Grocers and the Apothecaries, is founded.
- 1185 – 10 February: Temple Church is consecrated.
- 1189
  - 3 September: The coronation of Richard I takes place in Westminster Abbey. Rising against Jews in London.
  - Henry Fitz-Ailwin de Londonestone becomes first mayor of London.
  - A fair is active.
- 1196 – Spring: A popular uprising of the poor against the rich is led by William Fitz Osbert, who is hanged after being smoked out of his refuge in the tower of St Mary-le-Bow.
- 1199 – Shrievalty Charter: The new King John confirms that the City of London has the right to elect its own Sheriffs.
- c. 1200 – The royal treasury is transferred to Westminster from Winchester.
- 1205 – January is exceptionally cold.
- 1209 – Rebuilding of the stone London Bridge is completed.
- 1210 – c. November: 3 "leopards" (probably lions) are given to Henry III of England by Frederick II, Holy Roman Emperor, making them the first creatures in the menagerie at the Tower of London.
- 1212 – 10 July: The Great Fire of 1212 takes place in Southwark and in houses on London Bridge, with fatalities; thatched roofs are prohibited in the City as a consequence.
- 1215
  - 17 May: Rebellious barons occupy London.
  - 15 June: Magna Carta provides that "The City of London shall have all the old Liberties and Customs which it hath been used to have."
  - Mayoralty Charter: King John confirms that the City has the right to elect its own mayor annually.
- 1216 – 21 May: During the First Barons' War, Louis, Count of Artois, invades England in support of the barons, landing in Thanet. He enters London without opposition and is proclaimed, but not crowned, King of England at Old St Paul's Cathedral.
- 1217 – 12 September: Treaty of Lambeth ends the First Barons' War.
- c. 1219 – The first, timber, Kingston Bridge is completed.
- 1222 – 15 July: Rioting after London defeats Westminster in an annual wrestling contest; the ring-leaders are hanged or mutilated in punishment.
- 1232 – The Domus Conversorum ("House of the Converts"), a building and institution in London for Jewish converts to Christianity, is established by Henry III.
- 1234 – 2 December: A royal decree prohibits institutes of legal education within the City.
- 1235 – Famine in England; 20,000 people die in London.
- 1236 – Many people are killed in floods in Woolwich.
- 1237 – The Office of Chamberlain of London and status of Freedom of the City of London are both first recorded.
- 1240 – Old St Paul's Cathedral is consecrated.
- 1241 – The White Friars' monastery is founded.
- 1246 – The Liberty of the Savoy is created.
- 1247
  - Bethlem Royal Hospital is founded as the Priory of the New Order of St Mary of Bethlem.
  - Romford Market is chartered as a sheep market.
- 1249 – The Crutched Friars settle in London.
- 1253 – The Austin Friars monastery is founded.
- 1255 – An elephant joins the royal menageries at the Tower of London.
- 1257
  - c. September: 1257 Samalas eruption: A volcano erupts on Lombok Island in Indonesia, and the resultant climatic changes combine with a second successive poor grain harvest this summer in Britain to produce famine. This kills an estimated 17,000 people in Britain, of which 15,000 deaths are in London.
  - The Brothers of Penitence (Fratres Saccati, 'Brothers of the Sack') first settle in England, in London.
- 1262 – The first church of St Mary Abbots in Kensington is founded.
- 1263
  - 16 July: Rebels occupy London.
  - Savoy Palace built on the Strand waterfront by Peter II, Count of Savoy.
- 1264 – c. April: Targeting of Jews during the conflict with the Barons: One of Simon de Montfort's followers, John FitzJohn, leads a massacre of Jews in London.
- 1265 – Covent Garden market is established.
- 1267 – 9 April: During the Second Barons' War, Gilbert de Clare, 6th Earl of Hertford, occupies London. Simon de Montfort's supporters kill 500 Jews.
- 1269 – 13 October: The rebuilt Westminster Abbey is consecrated. The tomb of Edward the Confessor is relocated to behind the high altar.
- 1271 – The tower of St Mary-le-Bow collapses.
- 1272 – The Worshipful Company of Cordwainers and Worshipful Company of Curriers are granted rights to regulate the leather trade in the City, and the Fishmongers Company is chartered.
- 1282 – The Stocks Market is established.
- By 1290 – St Etheldreda's Church is built; after 1878, it will be the oldest Roman Catholic church building in London.
- 1291–4 – Eleanor crosses erected across England to mark the route of the funeral procession at the end of 1290 of Edward I's Queen, Eleanor of Castile, to Westminster Abbey. In London they are erected at Westcheap and Charing Cross.
- 1295 – The English Parliament constituency of Southwark is established.
- 1296 – Edward I brings the Stone of Scone from Scotland to Westminster Abbey; it will be returned in 1996.
- 1298 – The English Parliament constituency of the City of London is established.
- 1299 – A fire damages the Palace of Westminster.
- 14th–15th century – London's port develops as a European hub for the distribution of goods, particularly textiles.
- 1303 – Enfield Town market is chartered.
- 1304 – The Recorder of London is appointed.
- 1305 – 23 August: Scottish rebel William Wallace is hanged, drawn and quartered at Smithfield following a trial for treason in Westminster Hall.
- 1307 – The Tabard inn is established in Southwark.
- 1308 – The Woolwich Ferry is first mentioned.
- 1309 – The Thames freezes.
- 1314
  - Old St Paul's Cathedral is completed.
  - The Mayor prohibits the playing football in the environs of London.
- 1320 – Hanseatic League merchants establish the Steelyard, a Kontor, in Dowgate.
- 1322 – The Armourers' Guild is instituted.
- 1326 – 15 October: Walter de Stapledon, Bishop of Exeter and Lord High Treasurer, is murdered by the London mob.
- 1327 – The Goldsmiths' Company, the Merchant Taylors' Company and the Skinners' Company are incorporated.
- c. 1329 – Marshalsea prison is in operation in Southwark.
- 1331 – The Butchers' Guild is granted the right to regulate the meat trade in the City.
- 1344 – Clifford's Inn is founded.
- c. 1345 – Durham House is built in Westminster.
- 1348 – September–May 1349: The outbreak of the Black Death is at its peak.
- 1354 – The title of Lord Mayor of London is first granted.
- 1361 – The Company of Drapers is founded (it is chartered in 1364).
- 1363
  - 15 July: The Company of Vintners is chartered.
  - The curfew bell being sounded at St Mary-le-Bow is first recorded.
- 1365 – The Company of Plumbers is granted the right to regulate plumbers.
- 1366 – The Jewel Tower of the Palace of Westminster is completed.
- 1368 – The Company of Poulters is granted the right to regulate the sale of poultry and small game.
- 1371 – 28 March: The London Charterhouse, a Carthusian monastery, is founded in Aldersgate.
- 1377
  - 20 February: Riots in London after John of Gaunt attacks the privileges of the City.
  - The Royal Mews is based at Charing Cross.
- 1378 – Staple Inn becomes one of the Inns of Chancery.
- 1380 – Sir William Walworth, a member of the Fishmongers Guild, becomes Lord Mayor of London for the second time.
- 1381 – The Peasants' Revolt takes place:
  - 12 June: Rebels from Kent and Essex, led by Wat Tyler and Jack Straw, meet in Blackheath, where they are encouraged by a sermon from renegade Lollard priest John Ball.
  - 14 June: Rebels destroy John of Gaunt's Savoy Palace and Winchester Palace and storm the Tower of London, finding and beheading Simon Sudbury, and also Robert Hales, Lord High Treasurer. King Richard II (age 14) meets the leaders of the revolt and agrees to reforms such as fair rents and the abolition of serfdom.
  - 15 June: Peasants' Revolt: During further negotiations, Wat Tyler is stabbed to death by William Walworth, Lord Mayor of London in the King's entourage. Noble forces subsequently overpower the rebel army, the rebel leaders are captured and executed, and Richard revokes his concessions.
- 1382 – 21 May: Shocks from an earthquake in Canterbury are felt as an 'Earthquake Synod' is held in London.
- 1388 – The Inner and Middle Temples are recorded as corporate bodies.
- 1392
  - 29 May – Following the Fleet Street riot, King Richard II summons Lord Mayor of London, John Hende, along with the London sheriff and deputies and aldermen to appear before him at Nottingham Castle for a hearing on unspecified charges.
  - 25 June – At a hearing at Nottingham, the King Richard orders that Lord Mayor Hende is to be arrested, removed from office and imprisoned.
  - 22 July – After a second hearing at Nottingham, former London Mayor John Hende and other imprisoned city officials are assessed a fine and released from prison after posting bond to secure their return for future charges.
- 1394
  - 13 January: The Mercers Company is incorporated by royal charter.
  - The Salters Company is incorporated as the Guild of Corpus Christi.
  - 11 December: John/Eleanor Rykener, a transvestite male prostitute (and embroiderer) working mainly in London, and consorting with some who have taken religious vows, is interrogated by the Mayor of London following his arrest near Cheapside, leaving a rare surviving legal record from this period which mentions same-sex intercourse.
- 1395 – 20 March: The Worshipful Company of Saddlers is incorporated by royal charter.
- 1397
  - 8 June: Richard Whittington is nominated as Lord Mayor of London for the first of four terms by King Richard II following the 6 June death of Adam Bamme.
  - 13 October: Whittington is overwhelmingly approved by London's freemen to serve as mayor after he has negotiated a deal to settle its debt to the King for £10,000.
- 1399
  - 1 September: The imprisoned King Richard II of England is moved to the Tower of London.
  - 13 October: Coronation of Henry IV of England at Westminster Abbey.
- 1400 – During Lent, children give battle in London.
- 1403 – 12 July: The Stationers' Company's formation is approved by the Mayor and Aldermen of the City of London.
- 1407
  - The Company of Merchant Adventurers of London is chartered.
  - Plague in London.
- 1414 – 9 January: The Oldcastle Revolt, a Lollard rebellion in London, is suppressed.
- 1415
  - Syon Abbey is founded at Twickenham, the last new English monastery of the Middle Ages.
  - Approximate date: Moorgate is rebuilt.
- 1416
  - The Guildhall is rebuilt.
  - The Worshipful Company of Ironmongers is chartered.
- 1421 – c. 1 May: Whittington's Longhouse, a gender-segregated public toilet, opens in Cheapside.
- 1422 – Lincoln's Inn is recorded as a corporate body.
- 1425 – 30 October: Henry Beaufort, Lord Chancellor, tries to occupy London.
- 1427 – Harmondsworth Great Barn is completed.
- 1428
  - The Company of Grocers is granted a royal charter and completes its hall.
  - Serious fire at Baynard's Castle.
- 1430 – A tavern is established in High Holborn, which in modern times becomes Henneky's Long Bar and the Cittie of Yorke.
- 1433 – Greenwich Park is enclosed by Humphrey, Duke of Gloucester.
- 1434
  - The "Hopping Hall" tavern recorded in Whitehall, which in modern times becomes the Red Lion.
  - 23 November: The Thames freezes downstream of London Bridge.
- 1437 – The Worshipful Company of Vintners is incorporated.
- 1442 – The City of London School is established.
- 1444 – 24 April: Serious fire at Old St Paul's Cathedral.
- 1448 – The Haberdashers Company is chartered.
- 1450
  - July: Jack Cade's war tax rebellion is suppressed with ferocity.
  - September: Richard Plantagenet, 3rd Duke of York marches an army to London and attacks alleged traitors in the royal government.
- 1452 – A Lord Mayor's barge is first recorded.
- 1455 – 22 May: The Battle of St Albans takes place near London.
- 1460
  - 26 June: During the Wars of the Roses, Richard Neville, 16th Earl of Warwick, and Edward, Earl of March (eldest son of Richard Plantagenet, Duke of York) land at Sandwich with an army and march on London. Here, the Earl of Salisbury remains and, with the support of the citizens, besieges the Tower of London whose Lancastrian commander, Lord Scales, on 4 July turns its weapons against the city.
  - 19 July: Lord Scales surrenders the Tower of London to the Yorkists, and is subsequently murdered by a mob.
- 1461 – The Barbers Company is incorporated.
- 1462 – The Tallow Chandlers Company is incorporated.
- 1463 – The Ironmongers Company is incorporated as the Ferrers.
- 1466 – Crosby Hall is built in Bishopsgate by wool merchant John Crosby (died 1476).
- 1468 – 29 July: Hansa merchant's are expelled from London as the Anglo-Hanseatic War breaks out with the Hanseatic League.
- 1471
  - Wars of the Roses:
    - 14 April: At the Battle of Barnet, Edward IV defeats the Lancastrian army under Richard Neville, 16th Earl of Warwick, who is killed.
    - May: The Lancastrian commander Thomas Neville is prevented from entering the City but burns Southwark.
  - The Dyers Company is incorporated.
- 1473 – St Anthony's Chapel and Lazar House, the first medical facility on the Whittington Hospital site in Upper Holloway, is built for those with leprosy.
- 1474 – The Pewterers Company is incorporated.
- 1475 – Construction of the new hall of Eltham Palace begins.
- 1476 – September/December: William Caxton sets up the first printing press in England, in Westminster, where he produces his first full-length book on 18 November 1477.
- 1477 – The Carpenters Company is chartered.
- 1478 – The Canterbury Tales is published by William Caxton in Westminster, narrating the stories of pilgrims setting out from The Tabard in Southwark.
- 1480 – The Fullers' Company, a predecessor of the Worshipful Company of Clothworkers, is chartered.
- 1481 – A royal charter is given to Kingston upon Thames, granting it borough status.
- 1484
  - 2 March: A royal charter is granted to the College of Arms, the official English heraldic authority.
  - 10 April: An award by Sir Robert Billesdon, Lord Mayor of London, decides the order of precedence of the City livery companies, resolving a dispute between the Merchant Taylors and the Skinners by a compromise.
- 1485
  - The Yeoman Warders of His Majesty's Royal Palace and Fortress the Tower of London are formed by the new king Henry VII.
  - Approximate date: Bromley Hall, the oldest surviving brick building in London, is built.
- 1486
  - The Bakers' Company is chartered.
  - Rebuilding of the church of St Margaret's, Westminster begins.
- 1495 – Two centuries after its consecration, the rebuilt Westminster Abbey is completed.
- 1497 – 17 June: Cornish rebels under Michael An Gof are soundly defeated by Henry VII at the Battle of Deptford Bridge.

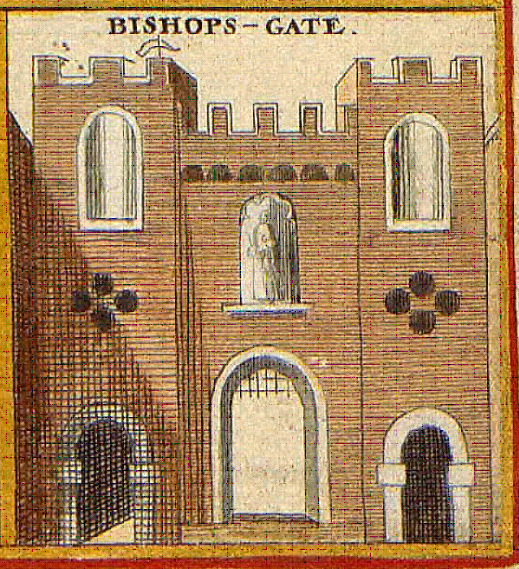
Bishopsgate

== 16th century ==
- 1500 – Wynkyn de Worde moves his print shop from Westminster to join others in Fleet Street.
- 1501
  - March: The first royal court is held at the new Richmond Palace.
  - The Plaisterers Company is incorporated.
- 1503 – 24 January: The construction of Henry VII's Chapel at Westminster Abbey begins.
- 1504 – St. John's Gate is built.
- 1508 – The Shearmens' Company, a predecessor of the Worshipful Company of Clothworkers, is chartered.
- 1509
  - 11 June: Henry VIII marries Catherine of Aragon privately in the church of the Observant Friars in Greenwich.
  - 24 June: Henry VIII is crowned as King of England at Westminster Abbey. During his reign, London's population reaches 100,000.
  - St Paul's School, London, is founded by John Colet, Dean of St. Paul's.
- 1512
  - Savoy Hospital opens.
  - Woolwich Dockyard is established for the Royal Navy.
- 1513 – Deptford Dockyard is established for the Royal Navy.
- 1514
  - 20 May: Trinity House is established as a guild of mariners in Deptford to regulate pilotage.
  - 13 June: Henry Grace à Dieu is built at the new Woolwich Dockyard and is dedicated in Erith. At over 1,000 tons, she is the largest warship in the world at this time.
  - 15 September: Thomas Wolsey is appointed as Archbishop of York and begins to build York House.
  - Thomas Wolsey leases Hampton Court Palace. In 1515, he becomes a Cardinal and begins to rebuild it lavishly.
- 1517 – 1 May: The Evil May Day unrest occurs at St Paul's Cross.
- 1523 – The rebuilding of the church of St Margaret's, Westminster is completed.
- 1527 – Sir George Monoux College, Walthamstow, is founded as a grammar school by Sir George Monoux, draper and Lord Mayor of London.
- 1528
  - 18 January: The Worshipful Company of Clothworkers is incorporated by royal charter, merging the Fullers' and Shearmens' Companies and taking over the latter's hall.
  - Late May: The 4th major outbreak of the sweating sickness appears in London.
  - June: Thomas Wolsey gives Hampton Court Palace to King Henry VIII.
- 1532
  - St Andrew Undershaft church built.
  - The erection of "Holbein Gate" across Whitehall is completed.
  - Henry VIII purchases the area surrounding the Tyburn (stream) which will become St. James's Park.
  - Lawyer William Portman leases farmland north west of the City, the basis of the Portman Estate.
- 1535
  - 4 May: The first Carthusian Martyrs of London are killed. From now until 1681, 105 Catholic martyrs will be executed in Tyburn.
  - Sutton House is built as Bryck Place in Hackney by Ralph Sadler.
- 1536
  - 17 May: Five men convicted on charges of adultery with Anne Boleyn, including her brother George Boleyn, are beheaded by axe on Tower Hill.
  - 19 May: Queen Anne Boleyn is beheaded by sword within the Tower of London (where she has been imprisoned since 2 May), having been convicted on charges of adultery, incest and high treason.
  - 13 November: Robert Pakington, a London mercer and MP, becomes the first person in Britain to be murdered with a handgun, while he is crossing the street from his home in Soper's Lane toward the Mercers' Chapel. It is a very misty morning and his assailant is never caught, despite the offer of a large reward.
  - 22 December: The Thames freezes.
  - St James's Palace is built in Westminster.
  - Hyde Park is acquired by Henry VIII from the canons of Westminster Abbey and enclosed as a deer park.
  - Bentley Priory is dissolved as part of the dissolution of the Monasteries.
- 1537
  - 25 August: The Honourable Artillery Company is chartered.
  - 18 May: The London Charterhouse is dissolved as part of the dissolution of the Monasteries and its members martyred.
  - The first complete Bible translation into English is printed in England by James Nicholson in Southwark.
- 1538 – Merton Priory is dissolved as part of the dissolution of the Monasteries.
- 1539 – Syon Monastery is dissolved and its community is exiled as part of the dissolution of the Monasteries, St Thomas' Hospital is closed, and the Convent of Holy Trinity, Minories is surrendered.
- 1540
  - 14 January: Southwark Priory is surrendered to the Crown as part of dissolution of the Monasteries.
  - 28 July: Thomas Cromwell is executed on order from Henry VIII on charges of treason in public on Tower Hill.
  - 30 July: At Smithfield, three Lutheran pastors, Robert Barnes, Thomas Gerrard and William Jerome, are burnt at the stake on a charge of heresy and three Roman Catholic priests, Thomas Abel, Richard Fetherstone and Edward Powell, are hanged, drawn and quartered on a charge of high treason.
  - 17 September: Westminster Abbey is granted the status of cathedral as part of the dissolution of the Monasteries, which it retains until 1550.
- 1543
  - Queen Elizabeth's Hunting Lodge in Epping Forest is completed for Henry VIII.
  - Approximate date: Wyngaerde's Panorama of London is engraved.
- 1545
  - The English Parliament constituency of Westminster is established.
  - St Giles-without-Cripplegate church is rebuilt.
- 1547
  - 28 January: King Henry VIII dies at the Palace of Whitehall. His 9-year-old son and successor Edward VI is brought to Elsyng Palace at Enfield Town, where his half-sister Elizabeth is living, and they are told the news.
  - 20 February: The coronation of Edward VI takes place in Westminster Abbey.
  - Edward Seymour, 1st Duke of Somerset and Lord Protector of England, begins the construction of Somerset House.
- 1550 – 24 July: The French Protestant Church of London is established by Royal Charter.
- 1551 – St Thomas' Hospital is re-established on its former site in Southwark by the Corporation of London, which is taken as the founding date for St Thomas's Hospital Medical School.
- 1552 – The first pupils enter Christ's Hospital school for orphans at Newgate; it receives its royal charter on 16 June 1553.
- 1553
  - 25 May: Lady Jane Grey is married to Lord Guildford Dudley, son of the Duke of Northumberland, in an elaborate ceremony at his Thames-side residence, Durham House, in which her two sisters are also married. The bride and groom are both aged around 15 or 16.
  - 16 June: King Edward VI founds Christ's Hospital for London orphans.
  - 6 July: King Edward VI dies aged 15 at the Palace of Placentia (Greenwich), having nominated Lady Jane Grey as his successor (without her knowledge).
  - 7 July: Northumberland secures the Tower of London and other strategic locations against Mary Tudor.
  - 9 July: Lady Jane Grey is summoned by Northumberland to Sion House and informed for the first time that she is to be queen.
  - 10 July: Lady Jane Grey is proclaimed Queen of England by the Privy Council and the proclamation is set into print.
  - 19 July: The Privy Council and Thomas White, Lord Mayor of London, proclaim the Catholic Queen Mary as the rightful Queen – Lady Jane Grey is imprisoned within the Tower after using the title of queen for nine days.
  - 30 July: Mary is greeted at Wanstead on the approach to London by her half-sister Elizabeth, who has ridden out from her new London residence, Somerset House.
  - 3 August: Mary rides triumphantly into London to claim the throne, accompanied by Elizabeth.
  - 8 August: Funeral of Edward VI at Westminster Abbey.
  - 22 August: The Duke of Northumberland, who has promoted Lady Jane Grey's claim to the throne, is beheaded on Tower Hill.
  - 1 October: Coronation of Mary I of England at Westminster Abbey.
- 1554
  - 25 January: Wyatt's rebellion begins, and Kingston Bridge is broken as a precautionary measure. On 9 February, Thomas Wyatt surrenders.
  - 12 February: After claiming the throne of England the previous year, Lady Jane Grey is beheaded for treason as is her husband – he publicly on Tower Hill and she privately within the Tower of London, where she has remained since the proclamation. On 17 March Princess Elizabeth is briefly imprisoned in the Tower, suspected of involvement in Wyatt's rebellion.
- 1555 – 4 February: John Rogers is burned at the stake at Smithfield, London, making him the first Marian Protestant martyr.
- 1556
  - 27 June: 13 Protestant Stratford Martyrs are burned at the stake.
  - The City takes over Bridewell Palace as a prison and a hospital for homeless children.
- 1557
  - May: Benedictine monks are allowed to return to Westminster Abbey, but they will again be expelled in 1559.
  - 4 May: The Stationers' Company is chartered.
  - Hampton School founded by Robert Hammond.
- 1558 – 25 May: Enfield Grammar School is founded, incorporating an earlier endowment.
- 1559
  - 15 January: Elizabeth I is crowned Queen of England in Westminster Abbey.
  - New Custom House is built.
  - The predecessor of the private banking house of Child & Co., which will still exist in the 21st century, is established.
  - The Salters Company is incorporated.
- 1560 – Westminster Abbey is made a royal peculiar as the Collegiate Church of St Peter and Westminster School is re-established.
- 1561
  - 1 March: Kingston Grammar School is chartered.
  - 4 June: The spire of the Old St Paul's Cathedral catches fire and crashes through the nave roof, probably as the result of a lightning strike. The spire is not rebuilt.
  - The Merchant Taylor's School is founded in the City of London by Sir Thomas White, Sir Richard Hilles, Emanuel Lucar and Stephen Hales, with Richard Mulcaster as first headmaster.
- 1563 – Between June and October, the 1563 London plague outbreak kills over 20,000 people.
- 1565
  - Thomas Gresham founds the Royal Exchange.
  - College of Physicians of London first licensed to carry out human dissection.
- 1567 – John Brayne builds the Red Lion theatre just east of the City of London, which is a playhouse for touring productions and the first known to be purpose-built in the British Isles since Roman times. However, there is little evidence that the theatre survives beyond this summer's season.
- 1569 – Gray's Inn is recorded as a corporate body.
- 1570
  - The Whitechapel Bell Foundry is known to be in existence. By the time its 18th-century premises closes in May 2017, it will be the oldest manufacturing company in Great Britain.
  - The home and library of John Dee at Mortlake begin to serve as an informal prototype English academy for gentlemen with scientific interests.
- 1571
  - 23 January: The Royal Exchange opens.
  - 28 May: The Corporation of London is authorised to improve the Lee Navigation.
  - 25 July: The Free Grammar School of Queen Elizabeth of the Parishioners of the Parish of Saint Olave in the County of Surrey is established in Tooley Street.
  - The Worshipful Company of Blacksmiths is chartered.
  - The first permanent London gallows are erected at Tyburn.
- 1572 – 13 February: Harrow School is founded by local landowner John Lyon under royal charter.
- 1573 – 24 March: Queen Elizabeth's Grammar School for Boys is established in Barnet at the petition of Robert Dudley, 1st Earl of Leicester.
- 1576 – December: James Burbage opens London's 2nd permanent public playhouse and the first to have a substantial life, The Theatre in Shoreditch.
- 1579 – Nonsuch House is built on London Bridge.
- 1580
  - 6 April: The 1580 Dover Straits earthquake causes some damage and the death of 2 children in London.
  - 6 July: New buildings are prohibited on less than 4 acres (16,000 m^{2}) of ground within 3 miles of the City.
- 1581
  - 4 April: Francis Drake is knighted by order of Queen Elizabeth I aboard the Golden Hind in Deptford.
  - A waterwheel is installed on London Bridge for the supply of drinking water to the city by Peter Morice.
- 1582 – The country house at Highgate later known as Lauderdale House is built for Richard Martin (Lord Mayor of London).
- 1583 – The Bunch Of Grapes pub is built on Narrow Street in Limehouse. Referred to by Charles Dickens in Our Mutual Friend as "The Six Jolly Fellowship Porters", it still stands in the 21st century, much rebuilt and renamed 'The Grapes'.
- 1585 – Claimed date that the Spaniards Inn on the Hampstead and Highgate boundary is established.
- 1586
  - 20–21 September: The execution of the 14 conspirators in the Babington Plot, intended to assassinate Elizabeth I and replace her by Mary, Queen of Scots, takes place. They are hanged, drawn and quartered in St Giles Field, with the first 7 being disembowelled before death.
  - The College of Antiquaries (society) is formed.
- c. 1586–90 - The new building for Enfield Grammar School is constructed.
- 1587 – The Rose (theatre), the first on Bankside in Southwark, is built by Philip Henslowe and functioning by the year's end.
- 1592 – August: The 1592–1593 London plague outbreak is first observed, and there are at least 19,000 deaths up to December 1593; theatres are consequently closed for much of the period.
- 1593
  - 6 April: Henry Barrowe and John Greenwood, leaders of the Brownist London Underground Church, are hanged at Tyburn.
  - 5 May: "Dutch church libel": bills posted in London threatening Protestant refugees from France and the Spanish Netherlands allude to Christopher Marlowe's plays. On 30 May, Marlowe is stabbed to death in a dispute over the bill at a lodging house in Deptford.
- 1594 – Bevis Bulmer sets up a system at Blackfriars to pump water to London.
- 1595 – The Swan (theatre) is built in Southwark.
- 1596
  - February: James Burbage buys the disused Blackfriars Theatre from Sir William More for £600 but is prevented from reusing it as a public theatre by a November petition by wealthy influential neighbors.
  - 14 February: Archbishop John Whitgift begins building his hospital at Croydon.
- 1597 – Gresham College is founded in the City.
- 1598
  - c. May?: The première of William Haughton's Englishmen for My Money, or, A Woman Will Have Her Will, considered to be the first city comedy, takes place, probably by the Admiral's Men at The Rose theatre.
  - 22 September: The playwright Ben Jonson kills actor Gabriel Spenser in a duel at Hoxton and is briefly held in Newgate Prison, but escapes capital punishment by pleading benefit of clergy.
  - 28 December: The Theatre is dismantled.
  - Stow's Survey of London is published.
- 1598–1600 – The Damned Crew is at large.
- 1599 – Spring/Summer: the Globe Theatre opens in Southwark using building material from The Theatre.

== 17th century ==
- 1600
  - January: Carpenter Peter Street is contracted to build the Fortune Playhouse just north of the City by theatrical manager Philip Henslowe and his stepson-in-law, the leading actor Edward Alleyn, for the Admiral's Men, who move there from The Rose by the end of the year.
  - 31 December: The East India Company is granted a Royal Charter.
- 1601 – 25 February: Robert Devereux, 2nd Earl of Essex, is executed for treason for his part in a short-lived rebellion in the previous month against the Queen, making him the last person beheaded on Tower Green in the Tower of London, with the sword being wielded by Thomas Derrick.
- 1603
  - 24 March: Elizabeth I dies at Richmond Palace and is succeeded on the throne of England by her cousin James VI of Scotland.
  - c. April: 1603 London plague: Outbreak of bubonic plague epidemic, spreading from the eastern suburbs, in which between 29,000 and 40,000 people die.
  - 28 April: The funeral of Elizabeth I takes place in Westminster Abbey.
  - 7 May: Crowds welcome James's arrival in London for his coronation as king of England in Westminster Abbey on 25 July. He subsequently orders the creation of St. James's Park.
- 1604 – 15 March: The Royal Entry of King James into London takes place.
- 1605
  - 5 November: Gunpowder Plot: A plot to blow up the Houses of Parliament and the King is foiled when the Catholic plotter Guy Fawkes is found in a cellar below the Parliament with 36 barrels of gunpowder following an anonymous tip-off. On 30 January 1606, 4 of the conspirators are hanged, drawn and quartered for treason outside St Paul's, and the following day Fawkes and the remainder are executed in the same manner in Old Palace Yard, Westminster.
  - The Worshipful Company of Gardeners and the Worshipful Company of Butchers are chartered.
  - Approximate date: Construction of Northumberland House at Charing Cross for Henry Howard, 1st Earl of Northampton, begins.
- 1606
  - 28 March: Catholic priest Henry Garnet is tried for misprision of treason at Guildhall in connection with the Gunpowder Plot, and found guilty. On 3 May he is brought from the Tower and hanged at St Paul's Churchyard.
  - 19 December: The Susan Constant sets out from the Thames leading the Virginia Company's fleet for the foundation of Jamestown, Virginia.
- 1608
  - July–December: Plague in London, which recurs in the 2 following years.
  - The foundation of the Royal Blackheath Golf Club is claimed.
- 1609 – The Lord Mayor's Show is revived.
- 1611
  - King James Bible first published.
  - Thomas Sutton founds Charterhouse School on the site of the old Carthusian monastery in Charterhouse Square, Smithfield.
  - The Worshipful Company of Plumbers is chartered.
- 1612 – Hicks Hall is built.
- 1613
  - 29 September: New River opens to supply London with fresh water.
  - The Honourable The Irish Society is incorporated as a consortium of City livery companies to colonise County Londonderry during the Plantation of Ulster.
- 1614 – October: The Hope Theatre opens in Southwark. On 31 October Ben Jonson's Bartholomew Fayre: A Comedy debuts here.
- c. 1615 – Clerkenwell Bridewell (prison) is in operation.
- 1616
  - The Anchor Brewery is established by James Monger next to the Globe Theatre in Southwark. It will be the world's largest by the early 19th century and brew until the 1970s.
  - The engraved Visscher panorama of London is published.
- 1616–35 – The Queen's House is built in Greenwich to a design by Inigo Jones.
- 1617
  - 23 August: The first one-way streets are created in alleys near the Thames.
  - December: The Worshipful Society of Apothecaries is incorporated.
  - Aldersgate is rebuilt.
  - The Goldsmiths' Company's barge is built.
  - Approximate date: New Prison in operation.
- 1618 – The Company of Adventurers of London Trading to the Ports of Africa is granted a monopoly on trade from Guinea.
- 1619
  - January: The royal Banqueting House, Whitehall, is destroyed by fire, and Inigo Jones is commissioned to design a replacement.
  - 21 June: The College of God's Gift is established by the actor-manager Edward Alleyn at Dulwich, incorporating the school, Dulwich College.
  - Greenwich Park is enclosed by a brick wall on the orders of King James I.
- 1620 – July: The Mayflower embarks from or near her home port of Rotherhithe with around 65 Pilgrims bound for Cape Cod in North America.
- 1621
  - Between Spring and October: The Corante: or, Newes from Italy, Germany, Hungarie, Spaine and France, one of the first English language newspapers translated from the Dutch, circulates in London.
  - The Hackney coach is first recorded.
- 1622
  - 6 January (probable date): The new Banqueting House, Whitehall, opens with a performance of Ben Jonson's The Masque of Augurs to a design by the building's architect, Inigo Jones.
  - 23 May: Nathaniel Butter begins publication of Newes from Most Parts of Christendom or Weekley Newes from Italy, Germany, Hungaria, Bohemia, the Palatinate, France and the Low Countries.
  - Boston Manor House is built by Dame Mary Reade.
- 1623
  - 26 October: "Fatal Vespers": 95 people are killed when an upper floor of the French ambassador's house in Blackfriars collapses under the weight of a congregation attending a Catholic mass.
  - Between 8 November and 5 December: Publication of the "First Folio" (Mr. William Shakespeares Comedies, Histories, & Tragedies), a posthumous collection of 36 of Shakespeare's plays, half of which have not previously been printed, by Isaac Jaggard and Edward Blount in the Jaggard printshop "at the sign of the Half-Eagle and Key in Barbican".
- 1624 – The Latymer School and Latymer Upper School are founded by the bequest of Edward Latymer.
- 1625
  - Around August: Over 40,000 people are killed by the bubonic plague in London, and so the court and Parliament temporarily move to Oxford.
  - Queen's Chapel is completed in Westminster.
- 1626 – 2 February: The coronation of Charles I of England takes place in Westminster Abbey.
- 1629
  - May: The Worshipful Company of Spectacle Makers is chartered.
  - Approximate date: Development of Lincoln's Inn Fields for housing begins.
- 1630
  - The central square of Covent Garden is laid out, and a market begins to develop there.
  - Sion College is chartered as a college, guild of London parochial clergy, almshouse and library under the will of Thomas White, vicar of St Dunstan-in-the-West.
- 1631
  - 31 January: The rebuilt St Katharine Cree church is consecrated by William Laud, Bishop of London.
  - 20 February: A fire breaks out in Westminster Hall, but it is put out before it can cause serious destruction.
  - 7 June: St Paul's, Hammersmith is consecrated as a chapel of ease by Laud.
  - December: The Holland's Leaguer, a notorious brothel in Southwark which has been ordered to close, is besieged for a month before this can be carried out.
  - The Worshipful Company of Clockmakers is established.
  - Tottenham Grammar School is re-endowed.
  - London's population reaches 130,163 residents.
- 1632 – Forty Hall, Enfield is completed.
- 1633
  - 13 February: Fire engines are used for the first time in England to control and extinguish a fire that breaks out on London Bridge, but not before 43 houses are destroyed.
  - St Paul's, Covent Garden, designed by Inigo Jones in 1631 overlooking his piazza, opens to worship, making it the first wholly new parish church built in London since the English Reformation.
- 1635 – The first General Post Office opens to the public in Bishopsgate.
- 1636 – Goldsmith's Hall is rebuilt.
- 1636–37 – Plague in London.
- 1637 – Hyde Park opens to the public in Westminster.
- 1638 – The Worshipful Company of Distillers is granted a royal charter.
- 1640
  - 11–12 May: Attack on Lambeth Palace by a mob; Archbishop Laud has fled. A young drummer, Benstead, is convicted of treason for encouraging the crowd, hanged, drawn and quartered, and has his head set above London Bridge and his quartered body parts distributed between various gates of London; and a glover, John Archer, supposed by the authorities to be a leader, becomes the last person in England to be tortured on the rack (in the Tower of London), but does not reveal any other names.
  - 11 December: The Root and Branch petition is presented to Parliament.
- 1641
  - 5 August: Theatres closed because of plague in London.
  - 23–27 December: Rioting in Westminster provoked by Charles I's response to the Long Parliament's Grand Remonstrance.
- 1642
  - 4 January: Charles I attempts to arrest 5 leading members of the Long Parliament, but they escape. This is the last time any monarch will enter the House of Commons.
  - 2 September: London theatre closure 1642: Parliament orders closure of London's playhouses, effectively ending the era of English Renaissance theatre.
  - 12 November: Battle of Brentford (First English Civil War): Royalist victory.
  - 13 November: Battle of Turnham Green (First English Civil War): Royalist forces withdraw in face of the Parliamentarian army and fail to take London.
- 1642–43 – The Lines of Communication are constructed to defend the city.
- 1647
  - 7 August: Oliver Cromwell takes control of the Parliament of England with the New Model Army, an attempt by Presbyterian MPs to raise the City of London having been unsuccessful.
  - 28 October–8 November: Putney Debates amongst the New Model Army and the Levellers.
  - The original Eleanor Cross at Charing Cross is demolished.
  - Wenceslaus Hollar's Long View of London from Bankside is etched in Antwerp.
- 1648
  - 11 September: The Levellers' largest petition, "To The Right Honourable The Commons Of England" (The humble Petition of Thousands well-affected persons inhabiting the City of London, Westminster, the Borough of Sonthwark Hamblets, and places adjacent), is presented to the Long Parliament after amassing signatories including about a third of all Londoners (including women).
  - 6 December: Pride's Purge: Troops of the New Model Army under the command of Colonel Thomas Pride (and under the orders of General Ireton) arrest or exclude Presbyterian members of the Long Parliament who are not supporters of the Army's Grandees or Independents, creating the Rump Parliament.
- 1649
  - 3 January: An explosion of several barrels of gunpowder in Tower Street, London kills 67 people and destroys 60 houses.
  - 30 January: Charles I is executed outside the Banqueting House, Whitehall.
  - April: Bishopsgate mutiny: Soldiers of the New Model Army refuse to leave London; some are court martialled and one is executed.
- Mid 17th century: London population reaches 500,000.
- 1650 – 29 September: Henry Robinson opens his Office of Addresses and Encounters, a short-lived form of employment exchange, in Threadneedle Street.
- 1652
  - 10 April: Prudence Lee becomes the last woman in England burned alive at the stake for mariticide, at Smithfield (subsequent recipients of the sentence being in practice strangled before burning).
  - A coffee house is in business near Cornhill, opened by Pasqua Rosée.
- 1654 – St Matthias Old Church in Poplar is completed.
- 1656
  - May: First performance of The Siege of Rhodes, Part I, by Sir William Davenant takes place, making it the first English opera (under the guise of a recitative), in a private theatre at his home, Rutland House, in the City. This also includes the innovative use of painted backdrops and the appearance of England's first professional actress, Mrs. Coleman.
  - Winter: Lisle's Tennis Court built in Lincoln's Inn Fields for real tennis.
- 1657
  - 8 January: Miles Sindercombe and his group of disaffected Levellers are betrayed in their attempt to assassinate Oliver Cromwell by blowing up the Palace of Whitehall and arrested.
  - 4 February: Resettlement of the Jews in England: Oliver Cromwell gives Antonio Fernandez Carvajal the assurance of the right of Jews to remain in England. This year the country's first synagogue (in Creechurch Lane) and Jewish cemetery in modern times open in London.
  - England's first chocolate house opens in London, together with the Rainbow Coffee House, the city's second such establishment; while tobacconist and coffee house owner Thomas Garway in Exchange Alley is the first person to introduce tea in England.
- 1658
  - 10 March: New London, Connecticut is named.
  - The earliest surviving terrace houses in London are built on Newington Green.
- 1660
  - 1 January: Samuel Pepys begins writing his diary.
  - 3 February: Colonel George Monck and his regiment arrive in London.
  - February: John Rhodes reopens the old Cockpit Theatre, forms a company of young actors and begins to stage plays. His production of Pericles will be the first Shakespearean performance of the Restoration era.
  - 29 May: Charles II arrives in London via Deptford and assumes the throne, marking the beginning of the English Restoration. He subsequently orders the remodelling of St. James's Park in the French style.
  - 13–17 October: 8 regicides of Charles I are hanged, drawn and quartered at Charing Cross.
  - 28 November: Royal Society founded at Gresham College.
  - 8 December: The first actress to appear on the professional stage in a non-singing role, as Desdemona in Othello. This is variously considered to be Margaret Hughes, Anne Marshall or Katherine Corey.
  - Approximate date: Vauxhall Gardens open as the New Spring Gardens.
- 1661
  - 6 January: The Fifth Monarchists unsuccessfully attempt to seize control of London, and George Monck's regiment defeats them.
  - 30 January: 4 deceased regicides of Charles I suffer posthumous execution at Tyburn; Oliver Cromwell's head, with the others', is raised above the Palace of Westminster Hall where it remains until the 1680s, later becoming a tourist attraction in private hands.
  - 23 April: The coronation of Charles II of England takes place in Westminster Abbey.
  - c. 1 May: The diarist John Evelyn publishes his pamphlet Fumifugium, or, The inconveniencie of the aer and smoak of London dissipated together with some remedies humbly proposed by J.E. Esq. to His Sacred Majestie, making it the earliest discussion of the city's air pollution.
  - 28 June: Lisle's Tennis Court in Lincoln's Inn Fields opens as a playhouse.
  - September: Pall Mall is laid out as a thoroughfare in Westminster.
- 1662
  - c. January: John Graunt publishes information about births and deaths in London in one of the earliest uses of statistics.
  - 2 May: The London and Westminster Streets Act 1662 (14 Cha. 2. c. 2) is passed, and the first hackney carriage licences are issued.
  - 9 May: Pepys witnesses a Punch and Judy show in Covent Garden, making it the first on record.
  - 23 August: An extravagant pageant on the Thames greets the arrival of Charles II and his new queen Catherine of Braganza at the Palace of Whitehall from Hampton Court.
  - September: Henry Jermyn, 1st Earl of St Albans, begins residential development of the West End.
- 1663
  - 7 May: Theatre Royal, Drury Lane opens.
  - The Olde Wine Shades is built as a merchant's house in Martin Lane.
  - Diarist John Evelyn obtains a lease of Sayes Court and begins to lay out the garden there.
- 1664
  - Francis Child enters the London goldsmith's business which, as the private banking house of Child & Co., will still exist the 21st century.
  - The Russian ambassador to England donates the first pelicans to live in St. James's Park.
  - Eltham Lodge is completed by Hugh May for Sir John Shaw, 1st Baronet (created 15 April 1665).
  - The construction of Burlington House begins.
- 1665
  - 6 March: The Philosophical Transactions of the Royal Society begins publication.
  - March: 15-year-old Nell Gwyn makes her first definitely recorded appearance as an actress on the London stage, having previously been a theatre orange-seller.
  - 12 April: The first recorded victim of the Great Plague of London dies. On 7 July the King and court leave London to avoid the plague, moving first to Salisbury, then to Oxford from 25 September to 1 February 1666, where in October Parliament convenes. The City begins use of Bunhill Fields as a burial ground for the victims. By the time the plague ends, over 70,000 people have died.
  - 13 June: The Worshipful Company of Poulters is granted a royal charter.
  - Thomas Firmin sets up a textile factory to provide work for the unemployed.
  - Approximate date: The Grecian Coffee House is established in Wapping.
- 1666 – 2–5 September: Great Fire of London: A large fire which breaks out in the City in the house of baker Thomas Farriner on Pudding Lane destroys more than 13,000 buildings, including the Old St Paul's Cathedral, but only 6 people are known to have died. It then takes over 10 years to rebuild the City.
- 1667
  - 8 February: The first part of the Rebuilding of London Act 1666, following last year's Great Fire of London, goes into effect as royal assent is given to the Fire of London Disputes Act 1666, which establishes the Fire Court. The Court, sitting at Clifford's Inn near Fleet Street, hears cases starting on February 27 and continuing until the end of 1668. The London Building Act enforces fireproof construction in the reconstruction of the City.
  - Hedges & Butler is established as wine merchants.
- 1668
  - 23 March (Easter): The Bawdy House Riots of 1668 break out.
  - The Carmen's Company is established.
  - The Lamb and Flag, Covent Garden is built (although first definitely recorded as a public house – The Cooper's Arms – in 1772).
- 1669
  - A new Royal Exchange building is completed.
  - The Quaker goldsmiths John Freame and Thomas Gould form a partnership as bankers in the City, an origin of Barclays.
  - Cosimo III de' Medici, Grand Duke of Tuscany, visits the Tower of London and gives the Yeomen Warders the nickname "Beefeaters".
- 1670
  - 21 January: The French-born gentleman highwayman Claude Duval, who was particularly active in Holloway, is hanged at Tyburn, and is thought to have been buried in St Paul's, Covent Garden.
  - 14 August: Quakers William Penn and William Mead preach in Gracechurch Street in the City, in defiance of the recently passed Conventicles Act 1670, and are arrested and tried but on 5 September the jury refuses to convict, leading to Bushel's Case.
  - The second Rebuilding Act is passed to raise the tax on coal to provide funds for rebuilding of St Paul's Cathedral and other City churches destroyed in the Great Fire.
  - Leicester Square is laid out.
  - The Apothecaries' Hall and the Brewers Hall are built.
- 1671
  - 9 May: Thomas Blood attempts to steal the Crown Jewels from the Tower of London whilst disguised as a clergyman.
  - 6 June: The rebuilt Vintners' Company Hall is in use in the City.
  - 9 November: The Duke of York's Theatre is opened at Dorset Garden by the players of the Duke's Company.
  - The Merchant Taylors' Hall is rebuilt.
  - The Board of Ordnance takes over the site in Woolwich known as "The Warren" as a military storage facility, predecessor of the Royal Arsenal.
- 1672
  - 25 January: The Theatre Royal in Bridges Street burns down, forcing the King's Company to relocate to the Lincoln's Inn Fields Theatre while the Theatre Royal is rebuilt in Drury Lane.
  - 30 December: The first commercial public concert series in Europe begins, organised by John Banister in Whitefriars near Fleet Street.
  - Ludgate, Moorgate, and Newgate are rebuilt, and the rebuilding of Temple Bar and the church of St Stephen's, Walbrook in the City begin to the designs of Christopher Wren.
  - The Worshipful Company of Paviors is granted a royal charter.
  - Richard Hoare becomes a partner in the London goldsmith's business which, as private banking house C. Hoare & Co., will survive through to the 21st century.
  - The Fulham Pottery is established by John Dwight, making it the earliest certainly known native stoneware manufacturer in England; it will survive until the second half of the 20th century.
- 1673
  - 22 January: The impostor Mary Carleton is hanged in Newgate Prison for multiple thefts and returning from penal transportation.
  - The rebuilding of St Mary-le-Bow church in Cheapside and Temple Bar gate across Fleet Street are completed to designs by Wren.
  - The Apothecaries' Garden is laid out in Chelsea.
  - Approximate date: Berkeley House, later known as Devonshire House, is completed in Piccadilly.
- 1674
  - 26 March: Theatre Royal, Drury Lane reopens having been rebuilt after a fire in 1672.
  - 17 July: 2 skeletons of children are discovered at the White Tower (Tower of London) and believed at this time to be the remains of the Princes in the Tower; they are subsequently buried in Westminster Abbey.
  - The Court house is rebuilt.
  - The Worshipful Company of Farriers is chartered.
- 1675
  - 7 May: The York Buildings Company ("The Governor and Company for raising the Thames Water at York Buildings") is established.
  - c. 21 June: The reconstruction of St Paul's Cathedral under Sir Christopher Wren begins.
  - 10 August: Charles II places the foundation stone of the Royal Observatory, Greenwich, designed by Wren.
  - c. October: Equestrian statue of Charles I (cast probably in 1633 to a design by Hubert Le Sueur and supposedly broken up during the Interregnum) is re-erected at Charing Cross.
  - 19 December: St Bride's Church, rebuilt to a design by Wren, reopens.
  - December: Charles II issues a "Proclamation for the suppression of Coffee Houses" due to the political activity which is occurring in the newly popular establishments, but it is quickly rescinded.
  - The Green Ribbon Club founded, based in Fleet Street, making it the earliest political club.
- 1676
  - Early: Thomas Firmin starts a workhouse in Little Britain for the employment of the poor in linen manufacture.
  - 26 May: A fire in Southwark destroys 625 houses.
  - July: Bethlem Hospital for the insane moves to new buildings in Moorfields designed by Robert Hooke, which had begun construction in April 1675.
  - Summer: The Royal Greenwich Observatory, designed by Sir Christopher Wren, is completed.
  - Exeter Exchange is built, Wren's rebuilt St Magnus-the-Martyr church completed, and the first Greek Orthodox church in England is consecrated on Hog Lane.
  - The hatters that become James Lock & Co. of St James's is established by Robert Davis.
- 1677
  - 10 October: The Grosvenor Estate in Mayfair comes into the hands of the Grosvenor family when Sir Thomas Grosvenor, 3rd Baronet, marries the heiress Mary Davies.
  - Monument to the Great Fire of London, designed by Wren and Hooke, is completed.
  - The George Inn, Southwark rebuilt.
  - The John Roan School is established in Greenwich for poor boys.
- 1678 – 17 October: The magistrate Sir Edmund Berry Godfrey is found murdered in Primrose Hill, and Titus Oates claims it as a proof of the fabricated "Popish Plot".
- 1679
  - 17 November: An effigy of the Pope is burned after a large procession through the streets of London.
  - 27 November: The Duke of Monmouth enters London amid scenes of widespread celebration, having subdued the Scottish Covenanters.
  - 18 December: Rose Alley ambuscade: The writer John Dryden is set upon by 3 assailants, who are thought to have been instigated by the Earl of Rochester in a literary dispute.
  - The new churches of St Edmund, King and Martyr and St Stephen's, Walbrook are completed to designs by Wren.
  - Joseph Truman acquires the Black Eagle Brewery in Brick Lane to form Truman's Brewery.
  - Approximate date: First bagnio opens in London.
- 1680
  - February: Rev. Ralph Davenant's will provides for foundation of the Davenant Foundation School for poor boys in Whitechapel.
  - 27 March: William Dockwra's London Penny Post mail service begins.
  - The York Buildings are built.
  - Approximate date: Jonathan's Coffee-House is in business.
- 1681
  - June–July: The City's Court of Common Council orders inscriptions for the Monument to the Great Fire of London and the house in Pudding Lane where the fire started blaming it on Papists.
  - 1 July: Oliver Plunkett, Roman Catholic Archbishop of Armagh and Primate of All Ireland, falsely convicted of treason, is hanged, drawn and quartered at Tyburn, making him the last Catholic martyr to die in England. The Catholic intriguer Edward Fitzharris is also executed on the same day.
  - 22 December: Charles II issues a warrant for the building of the Royal Hospital Chelsea for wounded and retired soldiers.
- 1682
  - 11 March: Work begins on construction of the Royal Hospital Chelsea to a design by Wren; it will open to Chelsea pensioners in 1692.
  - 19 November: A fire in Wapping makes 1,500 people homeless.
  - Hungerford Market is built in Westminster.
- 1683
  - 12 December: The River Thames frost fair begins, and lasts for several months. The Chipperfield's Circus dynasty begins when James Chipperfield introduces performing animals to England at the fair in 1684.
  - The Churches of St Benet's, Paul's Wharf and St James Garlickhythe, rebuilt to designs by Wren, are completed.
  - Richard Sadler opens the first Sadler's Wells Theatre as a "Musick House".
  - The Friendly Society of London, an early fire insurance company, is in business.
- 1684
  - 10 Downing Street is built in Westminster.
  - Clarendon House, built between 1664 and 1667, is demolished for the construction of Albemarle Street.
- 1685
  - 23 April: The Coronation of James II and VII and Mary takes place in Westminster Abbey.
  - 29 September: Edward Hemming establishes the first organised street lighting in London, with oil lamps to be lit outside every 10th house on moonless winter nights.
  - 18–19 October: Louis XIV of France issues the Edict of Fontainebleau, which revokes the Edict of Nantes and deprives Huguenots of civil rights. Many flee to London where they establish a domestic silk weaving industry in Spitalfields and "French ordinaries" (restaurants) in Soho.
  - 23 October: Elizabeth Gaunt, burned at the stake at Tyburn for alleged complicity in the Rye House Plot, becomes the last woman executed for political treason in England.
  - Kensington Square laid out.
- 1686
  - January: Montagu House, Bloomsbury is destroyed by fire when barely 6 years old.
  - 1 May: The annual May Fair opens on a new site at Shepherd Market.
  - St Andrew Holborn church, rebuilt to a design by Wren, is completed.
- 1687
  - 5 July: Isaac Newton's Philosophiæ Naturalis Principia Mathematica, known as the Principia, is published by the Royal Society of London.
  - Christ Church Greyfriars (Newgate Street) and the churches of St Lawrence Jewry and St Clement's, Eastcheap, all rebuilt to designs by Wren, are completed.
- 1688
  - By July: The first definitely known performance of the Henry Purcell opera Dido and Aeneas takes place at Josias Priest's girls' school in Chelsea.
  - 18 December: Glorious Revolution: William of Orange enters London.
  - Old Palace Terrace is built in Richmond.
  - Over the next 5 years Lloyd's of London marine insurance market begins to form on the premises of Edward Lloyd.
- 1689 - 13 February: William III and Mary II are proclaimed co-rulers of England in a ceremony at Guildhall, with their coronation taking place in Westminster Abbey on 11 April by the Bishop of London, Henry Compton. In May, work begins on remodelling Hampton Court Palace to the design of Sir Christopher Wren for them together with the Hampton Court Maze. Also this summer, the royal couple purchase Nottingham House and commission Wren to expand it to form Kensington Palace, and William commissions a new royal barge (shallop) for Mary.
- 1690
  - 7 January: The first recorded full peal is rung at St Sepulchre-without-Newgate in the City, marking a new era in change ringing.
  - March: London, Quo Warranto Judgment Reversed Act 1689 ("An Act for Reversing the Judgment in a Quo Warranto against the City of London and for Restoreing the City of London to its antient Rights and Privileges") passed by Parliament.
  - The Worshipful Company of Haberdashers establishes Aske's Hospital, comprising almshouses and a school at Hoxton, from the bequest of Robert Aske, origin of Haberdashers' Aske's Boys' School and others.
  - Approximate date: The Great Synagogue of London is built for Ashkenazi Jews.
- 1691 – 9 April: A fire at the Palace of Whitehall destroys its Stone Gallery.
- 1693
  - 27 February: The Ladies' Mercury, the first periodical specifically for women, begins publication but lasts only for four weeks.
  - The financier Richard Hoare relocates Hoare's Bank (founded 1672) from Cheapside to Fleet Street.
  - White's is established as "Mrs. White's Chocolate House" in Mayfair by Francesco Bianco.
- 1694
  - February: The première of Thomas Southerne's play The Fatal Marriage takes place at the Theatre Royal, Drury Lane.
  - 27 July: The Bank of England is established by royal charter.
  - 25 October: Queen Mary II founds the Royal Hospital for Seamen at Greenwich; first section completed 1705.
  - The new All Hallows Lombard Street church is completed to a design by Wren.
  - Approximate date: Development of Seven Dials begins.
- 1695
  - May: The Flying-Post newspaper begins publication.
  - June?: Première of Purcell's opera The Indian Queen.
  - Trinity Hospital on the Mile End Road is established as almshouses for "28 decay’d Masters & Commanders of Ships or the Widows of such" by Trinity House.
  - Hoxton House is established as a private lunatic asylum.
  - "Don Saltero's Coffee Shop" opens in Chelsea.
- 1696
  - Queenhithe windmill is built.
  - The evening newspaper Dawk's News-Letter begins publication.
- 1697 – 2 December: St Paul's Cathedral holds its first service after rebuilding to celebrate the Treaty of Ryswick.
- 1698
  - 4 January: The Palace of Whitehall is destroyed by fire.
  - 11 January–21 April: Czar Peter the Great of Russia visits England as part of his Grand Embassy, making a particular study of shipbuilding at Deptford Dockyard.
  - December: The Chalybeate well is given to the poor of Hampstead.
  - The widow Bourne sets up the business which becomes Berry Bros. & Rudd, who will still be operating as wine merchants in the 21st century.
- 1699
  - 10 May: Billingsgate Fish Market is sanctioned as a permanent institution by Act of Parliament.
  - The Howland Great Wet Dock opens as the first of what become the Surrey Commercial Docks.

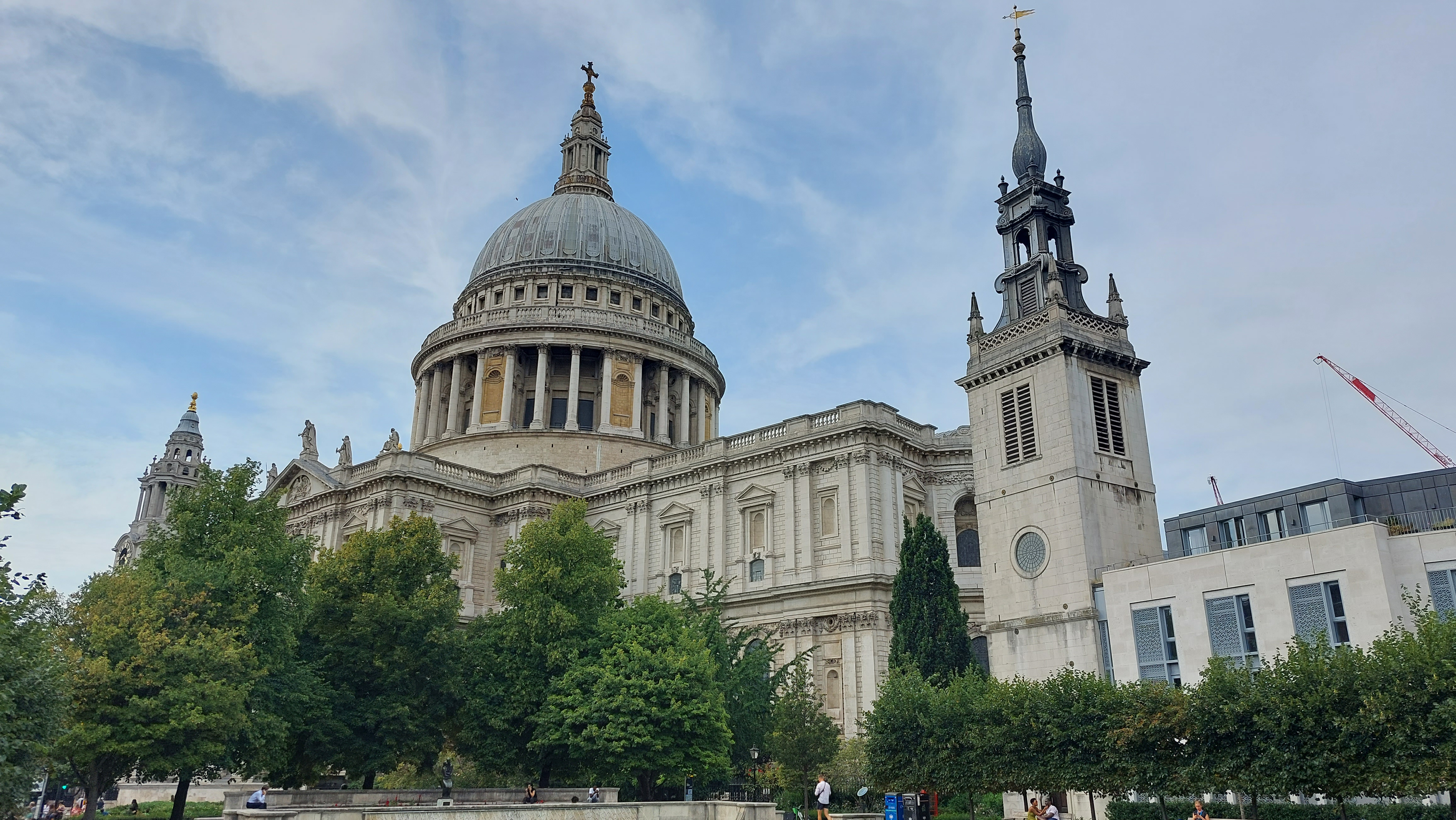
St Paul's Cathedral and tower of St Augustine Watling Street (also by Wren) from the south-east in 2022

== 18th century ==
=== 1700 to 1749 ===
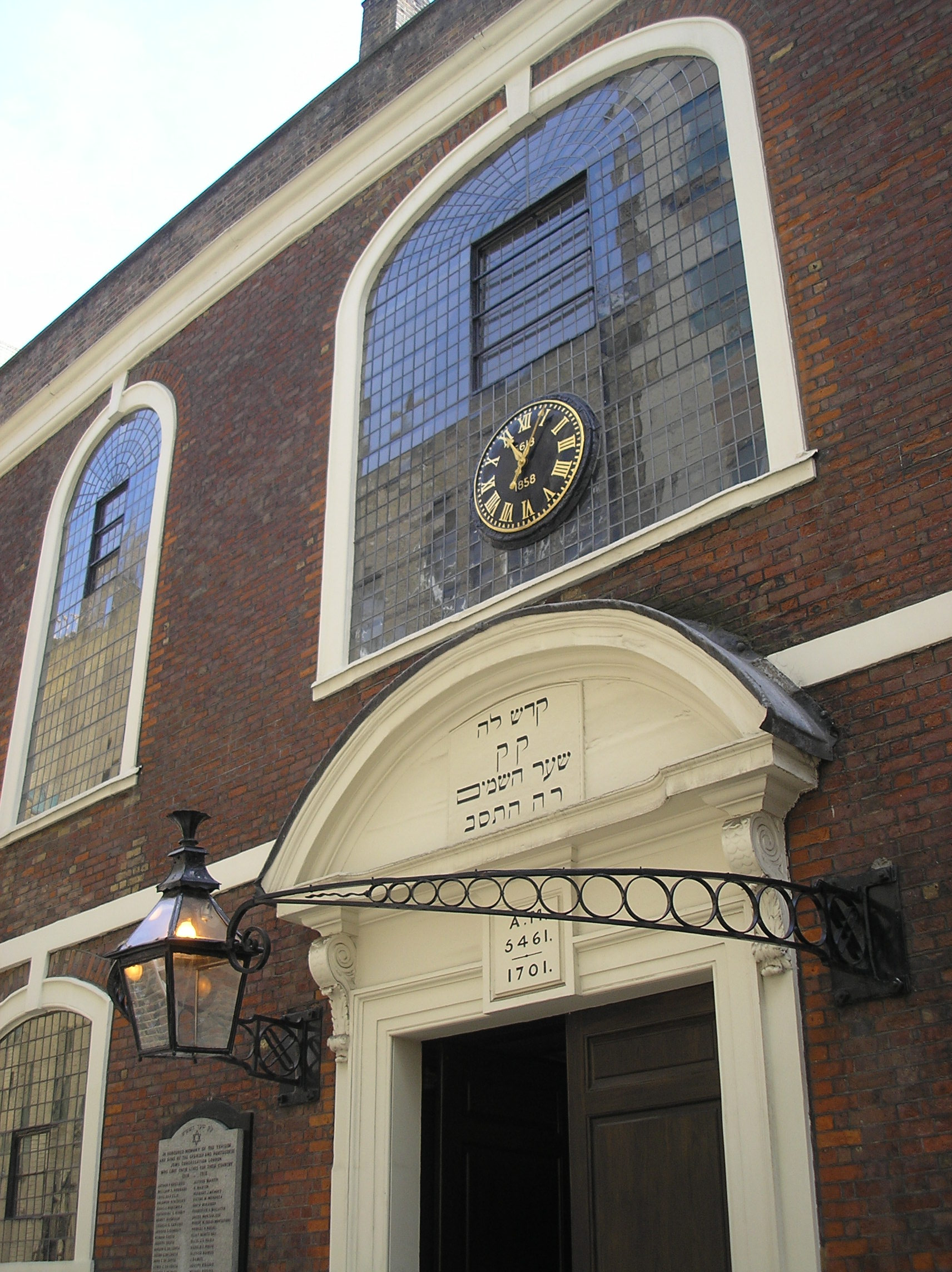
Bevis Marks Synagogue

- c. 1700 – The Kit-Cat Club is established.
- 1701
  - 23 May: Captain William Kidd, having been imprisoned at Newgate Prison and convicted by the High Court of Admiralty of piracy and the murder of one of his crew, is hanged at Execution Dock in Wapping. His body suffers gibbeting over the Thames at Tilbury Point; ballads are already spreading the legend that he has left buried treasure in the Americas.
  - The Bevis Marks Synagogue is built.
  - The illustrated magazine Memoirs for the Curious begins publication.
- 1702
  - 11 March: The first regular English national newspaper, The Daily Courant, is published for the first time in Fleet Street by Elizabeth Mallet; it covers only foreign news.
  - 23 April: The Coronation of Anne, Queen of Great Britain takes place in Westminster Abbey.
- 1703
  - 26–29 November: The Great Storm of 1703 damages ships in the Pool of London and the roof of Westminster Abbey.
  - Buckingham House is built in Westminster.
- 1704 – Aaron Hart becomes rabbi of the Great Synagogue of London and de facto the country's first chief rabbi.
- 1705
  - March: The first of the principal buildings of Greenwich Hospital, the King Charles Court, designed by Christopher Wren, is completed.
  - 9 April: The Queen's Theatre in Haymarket is opened by John Vanbrugh and William Congreve.
  - Paid able-bodied watchmen are functioning in the City.
- 1706 – October:
  - Thomas Twining opens Twinings in the Strand as Britain's first known tea house; it will still be in business into the 21st century.
  - The predecessors of food manufacturers Crosse & Blackwell set up business in London.
- 1707
  - 17 December: Major breach of the Thames embankment in Dagenham.
  - The London Building Act is passed to prevent use of combustible façade materials in the City; subsequently extended to Westminster.
  - Fortnum & Mason is in business in Westminster.
- 1708
  - 26 October: Topping out of the new St Paul's Cathedral.
  - The Greene Man public house in the Euston Road is established as the Farthing Pie House.
- 1709
  - 12 April: The Tatler magazine begins publication, and on 8 July, The Female Tatler follows.
  - 19 April: The Worshipful Company of Fan Makers is chartered.
  - 11 November: Henry Sacheverell preaches an incendiary sermon The Perils of False Brethren at St Paul's Cathedral, which leads to his impeachment by Parliament.
- 1710
  - 1 March: The Sacheverell riots take place.
  - 12 June: The Commission for Building Fifty New Churches is set up by the New Churches in London and Westminster Act 1710.
  - The Sun Fire Office is set up as an insurance business.
- 1710–12: Roehampton House is built.
- 1710–28: Church Road, Hampstead is built up.
- 1711
  - 24 February: The première of Handel's Rinaldo takes place at the Queen's Theatre, Haymarket, making it the first Italian opera written for the London stage.
  - 1 March: The Spectator begins publication.
  - 25 December: The rebuilding of St Paul's Cathedral is declared complete by Parliament.
  - Crown Court Church is established in Westminster.
  - Marlborough House, which had begun construction in 1709, is completed.
- 1711–14 – The Hawkubites gang is at large.
- 1712
  - Spring: The Mohocks gang is supposedly at large.
  - By October: The German composer George Frideric Handel settles in London, where he will remain until his death in 1759.
  - The Royal Hospital School is established by charter at the site of Greenwich Hospital.
- 1713
  - 9 April: St Mary's Church, Twickenham is severely damaged after the nave collapses, requiring it to be completely rebuilt.
  - The Hanover Square development begins.
- 1714
  - March: The Scriblerus Club, an informal group of literary friends, is formed by Jonathan Swift, Alexander Pope, John Gay, John Arbuthnot (at whose London house they meet), Thomas Parnell, Henry St. John and Robert Harley.
  - 12 May: St Anne's Church, Kew is consecrated as a chapel of ease by the Bishop of Winchester.
  - 20 October: The coronation of George I of Great Britain takes place in Westminster Abbey.
  - Geffrye Almshouses established by the Worshipful Company of Ironmongers in Kingsland Road.
- 1715
  - 13 January: A major fire originating in an explosion in Thames Street destroys more than 100 houses and severely damages the Custom House, which requires its complete rebuilding, before being contained in Tower Street.
  - 3 May: A total solar eclipse is the last total eclipse visible in London for almost 900 years.
  - 1 August: The Watermen first compete in a rowing race on the Thames for the Doggett's Coat and Badge sponsored by the actor-manager Thomas Doggett.
  - Allen & Hanburys are established as pharmacists by Silvanus Bevan at Old Plough Court.
- 1716
  - An accidental explosion at The Foundery in Moorfields kills the owner and 16 workers.
  - John Gay publishes the poem Trivia, or the Art of Walking the Streets of London.
- 1717
  - 1 January: Count Carl Gyllenborg, the Swedish ambassador to the UK, is arrested in London over a plot to assist the Pretender James Francis Edward Stuart.
  - 2 March: The dancer John Weaver performs in the first ballet in Britain, which is shown at the Theatre Royal, Drury Lane, The Loves of Mars and Venus.
  - 24 June: The Grand Lodge of London and Westminster, the first Freemasonic Grand Lodge (modern-day United Grand Lodge of England), is founded.
  - 17 July: George Frideric Handel's Water Music is performed on a barge on the Thames for King George I. In August, Handel becomes the house composer at Cannons.
  - September (Autumnal Equinox): The first known Druid revival ceremony is held by John Toland at Primrose Hill to found the Mother Grove, which is later to become the Ancient Order of Druids.
  - Thomas Fairchild, a nurseryman at Hoxton in the East End, becomes the first person to produce a successful scientific plant hybrid, Dianthus Caryophyllus barbatus, which is also known as the "Fairchild's Mule".
  - The Royal Brass Foundry is established at Woolwich Arsenal in a building designed by Sir John Vanbrugh.
- 1719
  - February: A Royal Academy of Music is established as a company to perform operas under the direction of Handel.
  - Raine's Foundation School is established by Henry Raine in Wapping. It closes on 31 August 2020.
  - James Figg opens one of the first indoor venues for combat sports, adjoining the City of Oxford tavern in Oxford Road.
  - The Hellfire Club is founded.
  - The Hand in Hand Fire & Life Insurance Society is founded.
- 1720
  - May: The first patient is admitted to the Westminster Public Infirmary, the predecessor of St George's Hospital.
  - 11 June: The marine insurers Royal Exchange and London Assurance companies are incorporated by the "Bubble Act".
  - 29 December: Haymarket Theatre opens.
- 1721
  - The Grosvenor Square development begins in Westminster.
  - Thomas Guy founds Guy's Hospital, originally for incurables discharged from St Thomas'.
- 1722
  - March: Daniel Defoe's A Journal of the Plague Year is published under the initials H.F., purporting to be an eyewitness account of the Great Plague of London in 1665.
  - The Bakers Hall is built.
  - Traffic on London Bridge is required to keep left.
- 1722–23 – Ranger's House, Blackheath is probably constructed.
- 1723 – 8 March: The Chelsea Waterworks Company receives a Royal Charter.
- 1724
  - 16 November: The notorious criminal Jack Sheppard is hanged at Tyburn.
  - Cannons, a house in Edgware for James Brydges, 1st Duke of Chandos, and Maids of Honour Row, terraced houses on Richmond Green, are completed.
- 1725
  - 2 March: A night watchman finds a severed head by the Thames; it is later recognised to be that of the husband, murdered the previous day, of Catherine Hayes.
  - 24 May: Jonathan Wild, fraudulent "Thief Taker General", is hanged at Tyburn for actually aiding criminals.
  - The church of St George's, Hanover Square is completed.
  - A fire in Wapping destroys 70 houses.
  - Approximate date: Queen Square is completed in Bloomsbury.
- 1726
  - 9 May: Catherine Hayes, convicted with two lovers for the brutal murder and dismemberment of her husband the previous year, becomes the last woman burned to death at the stake in England, at Tyburn.
  - 20 October: The new church of St Martin-in-the-Fields in Westminster is dedicated.
  - Fournier Street is built in Spitalfields, and is mainly occupied by Huguenot silk weavers.
  - The original Academy of Vocal Music is founded.
- 1727 – 11 October: The coronation of George II of Great Britain takes place in Westminster Abbey.
- 1728
  - 29 January: The première of Gay's Beggar's Opera takes place at the theatre in Lincoln's Inn Fields.
  - Queen Caroline divides Kensington Gardens from Hyde Park.
- 1729
  - November: The first (wooden) Putney Bridge, the only fixed crossing of the Thames between London Bridge and Kingston, is completed.
  - East India House; Christ Church, Spitalfields and St Botolph-without-Bishopsgate church (both designed by Nicholas Hawksmoor); and Marble Hill House, Twickenham are completed, with Chiswick House being designed by the owner, Richard Boyle, 3rd Earl of Burlington and William Kent.
  - Dr Williams's Library is opened as a research centre for nonconformist theology.
- 1730
  - 3 February: The Daily Advertiser is founded as the first newspaper funded by advertising.
  - The River Westbourne dammed to form The Serpentine in Hyde Park.
  - The perfumer Floris of London is established as a barber's.
- 1731
  - 1 January: The Gentleman's Magazine begins publication.
  - 28 April: A fire at White's Chocolate House, near St. James's Palace, destroys the historic club and the paintings therein, but is kept from spreading by the fast response of firemen.
  - May: Round Pond completed in Kensington Gardens.
  - 23 October: A fire at Ashburnham House damages the nationally owned Cotton library, which is being housed here at the time.
- 1732
  - Prince Frederick's Barge is built.
  - Jews' Free School is established in Camden Town.
  - 7 December: The original Theatre Royal, Covent Garden, predecessor of the Royal Opera House, is opened by John Rich.
- 1732–37 – The first section of River Fleet is culverted.
- 1733
  - 16 October: Devonshire House, the former Berkeley House in Piccadilly, is destroyed by a fire.
  - St Giles in the Fields church is rebuilt.
  - St George's Hospital opens at Hyde Park Corner, taken as the founding date of St George's Hospital Medical School.
- 1734 – The Bank of England moves to its modern-day location in Threadneedle Street.
- 1735
  - 22 September: Sir Robert Walpole becomes the first Prime Minister to occupy 10 Downing Street as his official residence in his capacity as First Lord of the Treasury.
  - The Sublime Society of Beef Steaks is founded.
  - William Hogarth produces his A Rake's Progress series of paintings.
- 1736
  - 19 February: The première of Handel's Alexander's Feast takes place at the Theatre Royal, Covent Garden.
  - 27 July: Riots in east London protesting at Irish immigrants providing cheap labour.
  - Parliament passes the Gin Act 1736 in an attempt to curb the Gin Craze.
- 1737
  - 2 March: Samuel Johnson and his former pupil David Garrick leave Lichfield to seek their fortunes in London.
  - 21 June: The Theatrical Licensing Act is passed, introducing censorship to the London stage, so plays now require approval before production. The "legitimate drama" is limited to the theatres at Drury Lane, Covent Garden and the Haymarket, and Edward Capell is appointed as the deputy-inspector of plays.
- 1738
  - 24 May: Aldersgate Day: John Wesley experiences a spiritual rebirth at a Moravian Church meeting in Aldersgate, which essentially launches the Methodist movement.
  - Marylebone Gardens open.
- 1739
  - 16 January: The first performance of Handel's oratorio Saul takes place at The King's Theatre, Haymarket.
  - 29 January: The building of Westminster Bridge begins.
  - 4 April: The first performance of Handel's oratorio Israel in Egypt takes place at The King's Theatre.
  - 17 October: The Foundling Hospital, established by Thomas Coram, is granted its royal charter. On 25 March 1741, the first children are admitted to its temporary premises in Hatton Garden.
  - 25 December: The Thames freezes.
  - The building of Oxford Street begins.
- 1740
  - 23 September: The London Infirmary is established; it opens on 3 November in Moorfields.
  - The first Bow Street Magistrates' Court is presided over by Thomas de Veil.
  - Thomas Witherby establishes his stationery business in London, specializing in printing and publishing for the marine insurance industry. By the end of the first decade of the 21st century, it will claim to be the oldest independent publisher in the English speaking world as the Witherby Publishing Group.
  - Approximate date:
    - Devonshire House is completed in Piccadilly.
    - Booth's London dry gin is first produced.
- 1741
  - 13 April: The Royal Military Academy, Woolwich is established to train officers of the Royal Artillery and Royal Engineers.
  - 19 October: The actor David Garrick has his London stage debut in Richard III.
  - St Katherine Coleman church is rebuilt.
- 1742
  - 28 May: The first known British bagnio to offer a swimming pool opens in London.
  - 16 September: The construction of the Foundling Hospital starts; the first boys are admitted in 1745.
  - The Chelsea Water Works Company introduces a Newcomen atmospheric engine in Pimlico, making it the first economically successful steam pumping engine in London.
  - Samuel Whitbread forms a partnership to acquire breweries, foundation of the Whitbread hospitality business.
  - Wilton's restaurant begins life as an oyster stall in Haymarket.
- 1743
  - 21 February: The première of Handel's oratorio Samson takes place at the Theatre Royal, Covent Garden.
  - The Gin Act 1743 attempts to increase taxation on gin, which provokes riots in London.
  - Ranelagh Gardens opens as pleasure grounds in Chelsea.
- c. 1743–45 – The Chelsea porcelain factory is established.
- 1744
  - The auctioneer Baker, later known as Sotheby's, is in business.
  - The Baltic Exchange is formed in the City.
  - The rebuilding of St Botolph's Aldgate church by George Dance is completed.
- 1745
  - 28 September: The song later to become the British national anthem God Save the King is first performed at the Drury Lane Theatre in a setting by Thomas Arne.
  - 6 December ("Black Friday"): Jacobite rising: Panic in London over the news that Jacobite forces from Scotland have reached as far south as Derby 2 days previously.
  - The east towers of Westminster Abbey, which had begun construction in 1722, are completed to a design by Nicholas Hawksmoor.
- 1746
  - 30 July: Francis Towneley is convicted of treason before being hanged, drawn and quartered at Kennington Common with fellow members of the Jacobite Manchester Regiment, and the heads of 2 of them become the last to be publicly displayed on Temple Bar.
  - The Shepherd Market development is completed.
  - The Carmen become a livery company.
  - Rocque's Map of London is published.
- 1747
  - 31 January: The first venereal diseases clinic opens at London Lock Hospital.
  - The piers of Westminster Bridge, which are under construction, are found to be sinking.
- 1748
  - 28 March: A 2-day fire in the City, starting in Change Alley on Cornhill, causes over £1,000,000 worth of damage.
  - August: The Camberwell beauty butterfly is named after specimens found in Camberwell.
  - Henry Fielding becomes a magistrate and organises the forerunner of the Bow Street Runners, starting off with 8 men.
  - The George and Vulture pub is built in the City.
- 1749
  - 27 April: A firework display in Green Park to celebrate the Treaty of Aix-la-Chapelle (1748) finishes early due to the outbreak of fire and rain, but it sees the first official performance of Handel's wind band suite Music for the Royal Fireworks.
  - 27 May: Handel stages a benefit concert at and for the Foundling Hospital at which the Foundling Hospital Anthem is premiered.

=== 1750 to 1799 ===
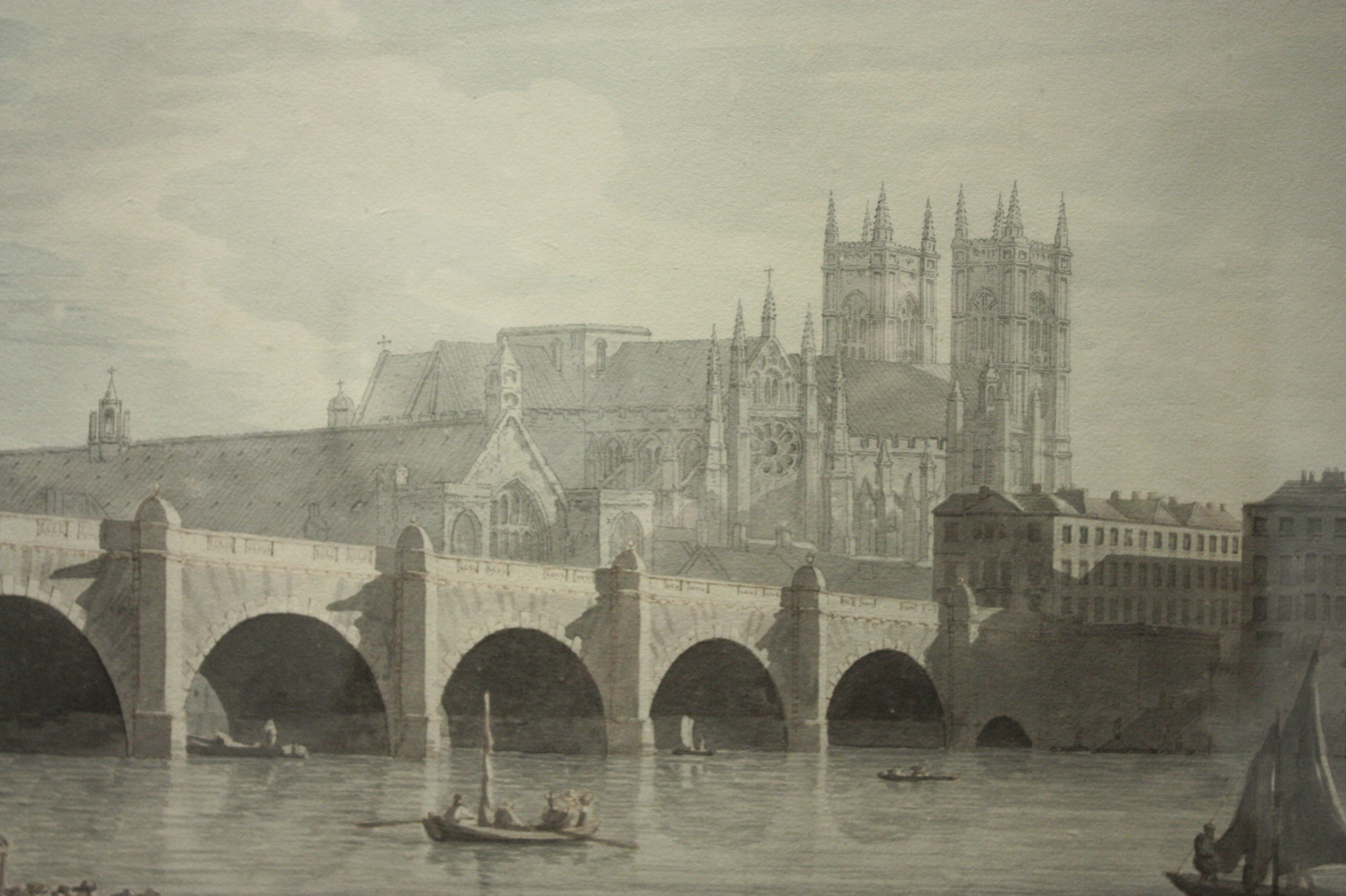
Westminster Bridge (1750), depicted by Joseph Farrington, 1789, with Westminster Hall and Westminster Abbey beyond

- 1750
  - 8 February: An earthquake is felt in London.
  - 8 March: A second, more powerful earthquake is felt in London, making this the last to have an epicentre here.
  - 1 May: Handel begins the tradition of benefit performances of his oratorio Messiah at and for the Foundling Hospital.
  - 18 November: The first Westminster Bridge opens, making it the only fixed crossing of the Thames between London Bridge and Putney.
  - Berners Street is laid out in Westminster.
  - Whitbread acquire a porter brewery on Chiswell Street.
- 1751
  - The Society of Antiquaries of London is incorporated.
  - St Luke's Hospital for Lunatics is founded.
- 1752
  - Mansion House is completed on the site of Stocks Market.
  - The Liberty Bell originally cast at the Whitechapel Bell Foundry for the Pennsylvania State House in Philadelphia.
- 1753
  - 29 January: After a month's absence, Elizabeth Canning returns to her mother's home in London and claims that she was abducted; the following criminal trial causes uproar.
  - 7 June: The British Museum is established by Act of Parliament.
  - 13 December: The first Hampton Court Bridge opens; it is built of wood in Chinoiserie style.
  - The first stage of Horace Walpole's Gothic Revival 'Castle' at Strawberry Hill is completed.
- 1755 – 15 April: Samuel Johnson's A Dictionary of the English Language is published by the group of London booksellers, who commissioned it in June 1746, with Johnson and his assistants having worked on the project at his home, 17, Gough Square.
- 1756
  - 25 June: The Marine Society is founded.
  - The first section of New Road opens.
- 1757
  - 4 April: The Lord Mayor of London's State Coach is commissioned.
  - Harris's List of Covent Garden Ladies, an annual directory of prostitutes, is first published.
  - Simpson's Tavern, Cornhill is established.
- 1758
  - 11 April: A temporary wooden bridge over the Thames, erected while the centre stone span of London Bridge is under repair, burns down.
  - c. December: The first Magdalene institution in Britain, Magdalen Hospital for the Reception of Penitent Prostitutes, is founded in Whitechapel by Robert Dingley, Jonas Hanway and John Fielding.
- 1759
  - 15 January: The British Museum opens at Montagu House, Bloomsbury.
  - 4 June: The first Kew Bridge, a wooden toll bridge over the Thames, opens to the public, replacing a ferry.
  - August: Holbein Gate is demolished.
- 1760
  - Hamleys toy shop is in business in High Holborn.
  - Berkeley Square is laid out.
  - Bishopsgate, Cripplegate, and Ludgate of the London Wall are demolished.
- 1761
  - 8 February: An earthquake breaks chimneys in Limehouse and Poplar.
  - 8 March: A second earthquake occurs in north London, Hampstead and Highgate.
  - 22 September: The coronation of George III as King of Great Britain takes place in Westminster Abbey.
  - Buckingham Palace is sold to George III; remodelling as a house for his new wife Queen Charlotte begins the following year.
  - The Orangery and pagoda in Royal Botanic Gardens, Kew are designed by William Chambers.
  - Aldersgate and Aldgate of the London Wall are demolished.
- 1762
  - 1 January: Boodle's is established as a gentlemen's club run by William Almack.
  - January: The "Cock Lane ghost" appears.
  - 23 March: The first legitimately constituted Sandemanian congregation in England meet at Glover's Hall.
  - 22 May: The Royal family first takes up residence at Buckingham House.
  - 25 December: Francis Baring is released from his apprenticeship and with his brothers forms the partnership that becomes Barings Bank.
  - The last remaining buildings are cleared from London Bridge.
  - Moorgate of the London Wall is demolished.
  - The German composer Johann Christian Bach arrives in London, where he will spend the remaining 20 years of his life.
- 1763
  - 16 May: James Boswell is introduced to Samuel Johnson at Thomas Davies's bookshop in Covent Garden.
  - Bow Street Horse Patrol are established to deal with highway robberies in the London area.
- 1764
  - February: Joshua Reynolds co-founds The Club (dining club) with Samuel Johnson.
  - March: Brooks's is established as a Whig gentlemen's club.
  - 23 April: Mozart family grand tour: 8-year-old W. A. Mozart settles in London for a year, lodging until August in Cecil Court with barber John Couzin. Mozart's first 3 symphonies will be written in London.
  - December: Benjamin Franklin arrives in London to represent the American colonies (following a previous visit in 1757).
  - Portman Square is laid out.
  - Horse Shoe Brewery is established at St Giles Circus for the production of porter.
  - Lloyd's Register of Ships begins publication.
- 1765 – February: Almack's Assembly Rooms open in St James's.
- 1766
  - May: The London Paving and Lighting Act is passed.
  - 5 December: James Christie holds the first sale at Christie's auction house.
  - Tattersalls is founded as a racehorse auction by Richard Tattersall at Hyde Park Corner.
  - John Gwynn's proposals London and Westminster Improved is published.
- 1767 – Newgate is demolished, leaving Temple Bar as the last remaining City gate.
- 1768
  - 4 April: Philip Astley stages the first modern circus, with acrobats on galloping horses, in Lambeth.
  - 10 May: John Wilkes is imprisoned for writing an article for The North Briton severely criticising King George III. This action provokes protesters to riot, and in Southwark, troops fire on the mob, killing 7, which is the Massacre of St George's Fields.
  - 10 December: The Royal Academy of Arts is established.
  - The publisher John Murray is established.
  - The rebuilding of Pitzhanger Manor in Ealing by George Dance for his own use takes place.
- 1769
  - 25 April–27 May: The first Royal Academy summer exhibition is held.
  - 28 June: The Morning Chronicle newspaper begins publication.
  - 7 August: Hackney Cut opens.
  - September: The Spitalfield Riots by silk weavers attempting to maintain their pay rates culminate in arrests by soldiers and the killing of 2 weavers.
  - 19 November: The first Blackfriars Bridge opens.
  - Work on Syon House to the design of Robert Adam ceases.
  - Gordon's London dry gin first produced.
- 1770
  - August: The Lady's Magazine begins publication.
  - 17 September: The Limehouse Cut opens.
  - The original Coal Exchange opens.
- 1771
  - November: The first Battersea Bridge, a wooden toll bridge over the Thames at Chelsea, opens to pedestrians. It opens to vehicles in 1772.
  - The intersection St George's Circus is laid out.
- 1772
  - 2 November: The Morning Post newspaper begins publication.
  - The Adelphi Buildings terrace is completed in Westminster by Robert Adam and his brothers.
- 1773
  - An informal Stock Exchange opens on Threadneedle Street.
  - Astley's Amphitheatre is founded on Westminster Bridge Road.
  - First London catering establishment to offer curry, Norrish Street Coffee House.
  - The original sundial column is removed from Seven Dials and acquired by the architect James Paine.
- 1774
  - 17 April: The first avowedly Unitarian congregation at the Essex Street Chapel is founded by Theophilus Lindsey.
  - 2 May: The Society of Antiquaries of London open the coffin of King Edward I in Westminster Abbey and discover that his body has been perfectly preserved for 467 years.
  - 5 October–10 November: 1774 British general election: In Westminster, Ignatius Sancho becomes the first person of African origin eligible to vote in Britain.
  - The London Building Act ("Black Act") aims to standardise the quality and construction of buildings.
  - The residential development of Highbury Fields begins.
- 1775–76 – Winter: An unusually deadly influenza epidemic kills nearly 40,000 people.
- 1776
  - 23 May: The first purpose-built Freemasons' Hall in England opens on Great Queen Street to a design by Thomas Sandby.
  - The construction of Somerset House begins in Westminster.
- 1777
  - 12 January: Richmond Bridge opens to traffic, replacing a ferry.
  - 8 May: The first performance of Richard Brinsley Sheridan's comedy of manners The School for Scandal takes place at the Theatre Royal, Drury Lane.
  - 24 July: The rebuilt church of St Alphege London Wall opens.
  - Hans Place is laid out in Knightsbridge.
- 1778
  - 1 November: Wesley's Chapel opens for worship on the City Road.
  - The second wooden Hampton Court Bridge built.
  - Joseph Bramah patents an improved form of the flush toilet, which he begins to manufacture.
  - Flint & Clark, the predecessor of Debenhams, begin trading as drapers; their successor will enter liquidation in 2020.
- 1779
  - 2 January: A devastating fire guts the chapel of Greenwich Hospital.
  - Robert Adam completes his remodelling of Kenwood House on Hampstead Heath for William Murray, 1st Earl of Mansfield, which was begun in 1764.
- 1780
  - 2 June: An anti-Catholic mob led by Lord George Gordon marches on Parliament leading to the outbreak of the Gordon Riots, in which the City banks are attacked.
  - 7 June: The Gordon Riots are ended by the intervention of troops. About 285 people are shot dead, with another 200 wounded and around 450 arrested, of whom around 25 will be executed.
  - The Finsbury Dispensary is founded.
  - The Middlesex Sessions House opens on Clerkenwell Green.
  - The original Craven Cottage is built by William Craven, 6th Baron Craven.
- 1781 – July: Barclay Perkins & Co take over the Anchor Brewery in Southwark from Hester Thrale for the brewing of porter.
- 1782
  - Spring: Plague of brown-tail moth caterpillars in London area.
  - 10 October: Sarah Siddons makes a triumphant return to the Drury Lane Theatre in the title role of David Garrick's adaptation of Thomas Southerne's Isabella, or, The Fatal Marriage.
  - 4 November: The Surrey Theatre opens as the Royal Circus and Equestrian Philharmonic Academy on Blackfriars Road.
  - First foot patrols in London.
  - The rebuilt Newgate Prison is completed.
- 1783
  - March–May: The Zong massacre trials are held.
  - 8 June: The Surrey Chapel, Southwark is established by the evangelical preacher Rowland Hill.
  - 7 November: Murderer John Austin (highwayman) becomes the last person publicly executed at Tyburn; from 9 December, executions are held outside the new Newgate Prison.
- 1784
  - c. April–August: William Roy sets out the baseline of the Anglo-French Survey (1784–1790) on Hounslow Heath.
  - 2 April: The construction of Severndroog Castle on Shooter's Hill begins.
  - 21 August: Joseph Bramah patents the Bramah lock which he then begins to manufacture.
  - 15 September: The Italian Vincenzo Lunardi makes the first hydrogen balloon flight in Britain, from Moorfields to South Mimms.
  - The development of Somers Town begins.
- 1785
  - The London Hospital Medical College opens as England's first chartered medical school.
  - The New Spring Gardens is renamed Vauxhall Gardens.
- 1786
  - 21 June: First woman to be burnt at the stake at Newgate Prison (as distinct from Tyburn or Smithfield), Phoebe Harris for coin counterfeiting. She is led to the stake past the hanged bodies of her accomplices but is allowed to be strangled before the flames are lit.
  - 2 August: A delusional needlewoman, Margaret Nicholson, attempts to stab the king outside St James's Palace; she will be confined for the remaining 42 years of her life in Bethlehem Hospital for the insane.
- 1787
  - 31 May: The original Lord's Cricket Ground holds its first cricket match; Marylebone Cricket Club is founded.
  - John Courage acquires the Anchor Brewhouse in Shad Thames.
- 1788
  - 1 January: The first edition of The Times newspaper is published under this title after it was launched in 1785 as The Daily Universal Register.
  - Admiralty House is built on Whitehall.
  - The Revolution Society is formed.
  - The group that later becomes the Royal Philanthropic Society is formed to assist homeless children.
- 1789
  - 18 March: Catherine Murphy, a counterfeiter, becomes the last woman in Britain to suffer a sentence of death by burning, at Newgate Prison (although she is in practice strangled before being burnt).
  - 4 May: The Boydell Shakespeare Gallery opens.
  - 22 September: The first stone Kew Bridge opens.
  - London plane (Platanus × hispanica) trees are planted in Berkeley Square.
  - Rowney, which was established in 1783 as perfumers, enter the artists' supplies business.
- 1790 – 23 June: The alleged London Monster is arrested, and he later receives 2 years' imprisonment for 3 assaults.
- 1791
  - 1 January: Austrian composer Joseph Haydn arrives in England at the invitation of London resident impresario Johann Peter Salomon, where his concerts are huge successes. On 11 March, the first of his London symphonies, Symphony No. 96, is premièred at the Hanover Square Rooms. He visits again in 1794.
  - The first St James's, Spanish Place (Roman Catholic) is built as a chapel primarily to serve the Spanish Embassy.
  - Camden Town development begins.
  - Giltspur Street Compter (prison) built.
  - Architect John Soane begins reconstruction of the Bank of England.
- 1792
  - 25 January: The radical London Corresponding Society is formed.
  - 21 June: Iolo Morganwg holds the first Gorsedd ceremony, on Primrose Hill.
  - 29 September: The first St Patrick's Church, Soho Square (Roman Catholic) is consecrated as a chapel primarily to serve the Irish.
  - Henry Walton Smith and his wife Anna establish the newsagent's business on Little Grosvenor Street which will become W H Smith.
- 1793
  - The painter Robert Barker opens his panorama in a purpose-built rotunda off Leicester Square.
  - The permanent Cavalry Barracks, Hounslow are established.
- 1794
  - 12 March: The rebuilt Theatre Royal, Drury Lane opens.
  - 23 July: The Ratcliffe Fire destroys over 400 homes.
  - Construction of houses on the edge of Blackheath designed by Michael Searles, begins with The Paragon (a crescent), South Row and Montpelier Row; they will be completed in 1805.
  - Coldbath Fields Prison is rebuilt.
  - Lambeth resident William Blake publishes Songs of Experience including the poem "London".
  - Sarson's vinegar is first brewed in Shoreditch.
- 1795
  - 22 September: The London Missionary Society is established.
  - 29 October: George III is pelted with stones by an angry mob as the bread riots continue.
  - The Pantheon is rebuilt.
  - The Ackermann print-shop is in business.
- 1796
  - 1 February: Protests over the price of bread culminate in Queen Charlotte being hit by a stone as she and George III return from a trip to the theatre.
  - December: The coldest day in London is recorded, reaching −21.1 °C (−6 °F) in Greenwich.
- 1797
  - 15 January: London haberdasher John Hetherington wears the first top hat in public and attracts a large crowd of onlookers. He is later fined £50 for causing public nuisance.
  - Hatchards bookshop is established in Piccadilly by John Hatchard.
- 1798
  - 2 July: The Marine Police Force is formed on the Thames by magistrate Patrick Colquhoun to prevent pilfering in the Port of London and West India Docks; it is the first organised police force in Britain.
  - Henry Maudslay sets up the mechanical engineering business that becomes Maudslay, Sons and Field.
  - Rules (restaurant) is opened by Thomas Rule in Maiden Lane, Covent Garden as an oyster bar, making it London's oldest restaurant on its original site.
- 1799
  - Gunter's Tea Shop is in business.
  - Horsemonger Lane Gaol is completed as the new Surrey County Gaol in Southwark.

== See also ==
- History of London
- List of Lord Mayors of London

== Bibliography ==
See also lists of works about London by period: Tudor London, Stuart London, 18th century, 19th century, 1900–1939, 1960s

published in the 19th century

- Elmes, James (1831). Topographical Dictionary of London and Its Environs. London: Whittaker, Treacher and Arnot.
- Thomas Allen; Thomas Wright (1839). "Account of the Companies of the City of London, Alphabetically Arranged". History and Antiquities of London, Westminster, Southwark, and Parts Adjacent. Vol. 2. London. pp. 376–429. hdl:2027/hvd.hwh1uq.
- "London". Penny Cyclopaedia. Vol. 14. London: Charles Knight. 1839. pp. 109–129. hdl:2027/ucm.5319406728.
- Charles Knight, ed. (1844), "Metropolitan Boroughs", London, vol. 6, London: C. Knight & Co.
- Peter Cunningham (1850), "Chronology of London Occurrences", Handbook of London (2nd ed.), London: John Murray, OCLC 4773921
- J. Willoughby Rosse (1859). "London". Index of Dates ... Facts in the Chronology and History of the World. Bohn's reference library. London: H.G. Bohn. hdl:2027/hvd.32044098621048 – via HathiTrust.
- Timbs, John (1866), Club Life of London, London: J. Bentley, OL 7098926M
- George Henry Townsend (1867), "London", A Manual of Dates (2nd ed.), London: Frederick Warne & Co., pp. 587–590
- William Henry Overall, ed. (1870), "London", Dictionary of Chronology, London: William Tegg, OCLC 2613202
- Charles Dickens (1882), "Historical Events", Dickens's Dictionary of London, London: Macmillan & Co.
- John and Robert Maxwell (1885). "Memorable Dates". Concise Guide to London. London. circa 1882
- R. Price-Williams (1885), "Population of London, 1801–81", Journal of the Statistical Society, vol. 48, pp. 349–432, hdl:2027/uc1.b4148209
- Mrs. Basil Holmes (1896). "Burial-Grounds within the Metropolitan Area". London Burial Grounds. Macmillan.

published in the 20th century

- Henry Barton Baker (1904), "Chronological List of the London Theatres", History of the London Stage and its Famous Players (1576–1903), London: Routledge
- Chisholm, Hugh, ed. (1910). "Westminster" . Encyclopædia Britannica. Vol. 28 (11th ed.). Cambridge University Press. pp. 549–551.
- Robert Donald, ed. (1907). "London". Municipal Year Book of the United Kingdom for 1907. London: Edward Lloyd. pp. 5–47.
- Howarth, Osbert John Radcliffe; Ingram, Thomas Allan; Wheatley, Henry Benjamin (1910). "London" . In Chisholm, Hugh (ed.). Encyclopædia Britannica. Vol. 16 (11th ed.). Cambridge University Press. pp. 938–968, see pages 945 and 951. "IV. Population, Public Health, &c. & VII. Government"
- Francis Miltoun (1908). "Brief Chronology". Dickens' London. Boston: L.C. Page & Company.
- Benjamin Vincent (1910), "London", Haydn's Dictionary of Dates (25th ed.), London: Ward, Lock & Co., pp. 839–848
- Walter H. Godfrey (1911), "List of Buildings on ... Map 1: The City of London and Southwark", History of Architecture in London, London: B.T. Batsford
- Cook's Handbook to London. London: Thos. Cook & Son. 1921.
- Muirhead, James Fullarton (1922). "London" . Encyclopædia Britannica. Vol. 31 (12th ed.).
- George F.E. Rudé (1971). Hanoverian London, 1714–1808. History of London. University of California Press. ISBN 978-0-520-01778-8.
- Nicholson, Louise (1998). "London Chronology". London. Abbeville Press. ISBN 978-0-7112-1187-2.

published in the 21st century

- John Richardson (2000). The Annals of London: A Year-by-year Record of a Thousand Years of History. University of California Press. ISBN 978-0-520-22795-8.
- Leonard Schwarz (2000). "London, 1700–1840". In Peter Clark (ed.). Cambridge Urban History of Britain. Vol. 2. Cambridge University Press. p. 641+. ISBN 978-0-521-43141-5.
- Ackroyd, Peter (2001), "Chronology", London: the Biography, Nan A. Talese, ISBN 9780385497701
- Erika Diane Rappaport (2001). Shopping for Pleasure: Women in the Making of London's West End. Princeton University Press. ISBN 0-691-04476-7.
- A.N. Wilson (2004). "Chronology of London History". London: A History. Modern Library. p. 193+. ISBN 978-0-307-42665-9.
- Ben Weinreb; et al. (2008). The London Encyclopaedia (3rd ed.). Macmillan. ISBN 978-0-230-73878-2.
- Michelin; Lifestyle, Michelin Travel (2012). "20C to Today (timeline)". London. Michelin Green Guide. ISBN 978-2-06-718238-7.
- Jonathan Conlin (2013). Tales of Two Cities: Paris, London and the Birth of the Modern City. Counterpoint LLC. ISBN 978-1-61902-225-6.
- Marc Matera (2015). Black London: The Imperial Metropolis and Decolonization in the Twentieth Century. University of California Press. ISBN 978-0-520-95990-3.
