= Mohocks =

18th century London gang

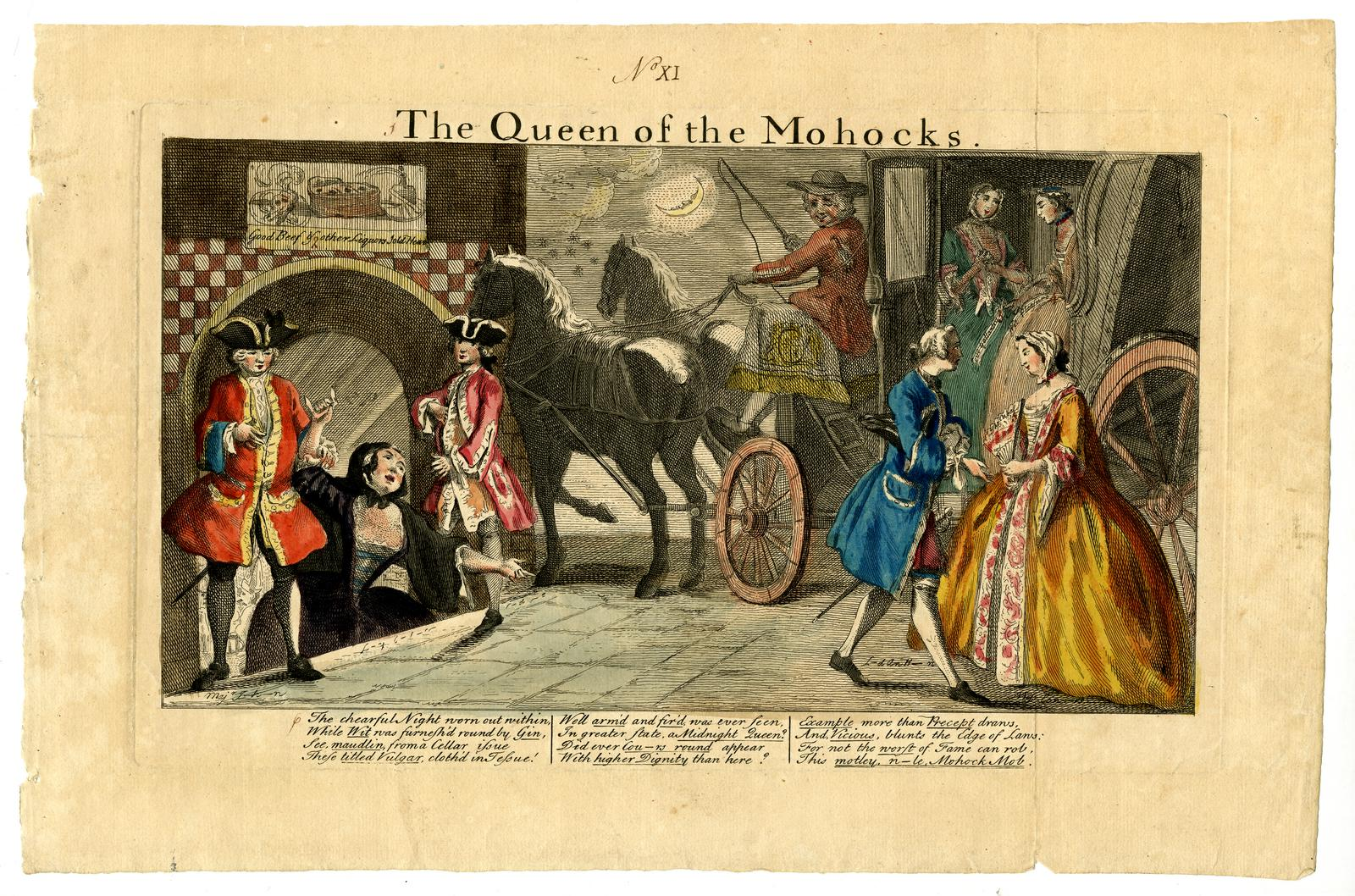
1745 satirical print about the Mohocks

The Mohocks were allegedly a gang of violent, well-born criminals that terrorised London during the early 18th century, attacking men and women alike, and taking their name from the Mohawks. Their activities, which were perhaps sensationalised, were said to include murder. The matter ended in 1712 when a bounty of £100 was issued by the royal court for their capture.

According to Lady Wentworth, "They put an old woman into a hogshead, and rolled her down a hill; they cut off some noses, others' hands, and several barbarous tricks, without any provocation. They are said to be young gentlemen; they never take any money from any." (Wentworth Papers, 277)

Historians have found little evidence of any organised gang, though in spring 1712 there was a flurry of print accounts of the Mohocks, their lawlessness, impunity and luridly violent acts. In response there was also some derision from satirists at what they perceived to be sensationalism by the Grub Street press. John Gay's first drama, The Mohocks, was written that year but was not performed for political reasons. It was, however, published as a pseudonymous pamphlet.

In 18th century London, the name Mohawks was subsequently applied to other upper-class drunken rowdies and bravos. William Hickey recalled "In the winter of 1771, a set of wild young men made their appearance, who, from the profligacy of their manners and their outrageous conduct in the theatres, taverns, and coffee houses in the vicinity of Covent Garden, created general indignation and alarm.... They were distinguished under the title of Mohawks." Hickey identified their boss as Rhoan Hamilton, "a man of fortune" and later an Irish rebel, and Messrs Hayter, son of a bank director, Osborne, an American, and "Capt." Frederick.

Various other gangs of street bullies are alleged to have terrorised London at different periods, beginning during the 1590s with the Damned Crew and continuing after the Restoration with the Muns, the Tityré Tūs, the Hectors, the Scourers, the Nickers, and the Hawkubites.

In his novel The Man Who Laughs, Victor Hugo writes

The most fashionable of the clubs was presided over by an emperor, who wore a crescent on his forehead, and was called the Grand Mohawk. The Mohawk surpassed the Fun. Do evil for evil's sake was the programme. The Mohawk Club had one great object—to injure. To fulfil this duty all means were held good. In becoming a Mohawk the members took an oath to be hurtful. To injure at any price, no matter when, no matter whom, no matter where, was a matter of duty. Every member of the Mohawk Club was bound to possess an accomplishment. One was "a dancing master;" that is to say he made the rustics frisk about by pricking the calves of their legs with the point of his sword. Others knew how to make a man sweat; That is to say, a circle of gentlemen with drawn rapiers would surround a poor wretch, so that it was impossible for him not to turn his back upon some one. The gentleman behind him chastised him for this by a prick of his sword, which made him spring round; another prick in the back warned the fellow that one of noble blood was behind him, and so on, each one wounding him in his turn. When the man, closed round by the circle of swords and covered with blood, had turned and danced about enough, they ordered their servants to beat him with sticks, to change the course of his ideas. Others "hit the lion"—that is, they gaily stopped a passenger, broke his nose with a blow of the fist, and then shoved both thumbs into his eyes. If his eyes were gouged out, he was paid for them. Such were, towards the beginning of the eighteenth century, the pastimes of the rich idlers of London.
