= Mermaid Tavern =

Former tavern in London

Coordinates: 51.512826°N 0.09532°W

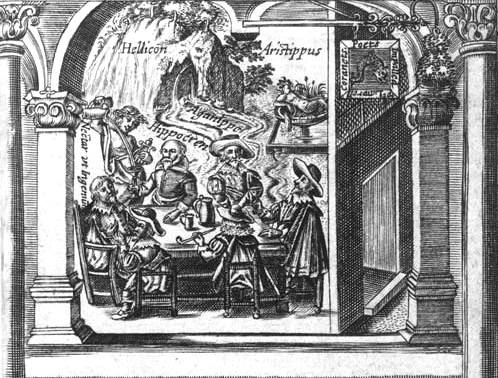
Top half of the title page of Richard Braithwait's Lawes of Drinking, William Marshall, engraver. It has been argued that the tavern sign, which reads (clockwise from top) Poets impalled wt Lawrell coranets (Poets impaled with laurel coronets), is that of the Mermaid Tavern.

The Mermaid Tavern was a tavern on Cheapside in London during the Elizabethan era, located east of St. Paul's Cathedral on the corner of Friday Street and Bread Street. It was the site of the so-called "Fraternity of Sireniacal Gentlemen", a drinking club that met on the first Friday of every month that included some of the Elizabethan era's leading literary figures, among them Ben Jonson, John Donne, John Fletcher and Francis Beaumont, Thomas Coryat, John Selden, Robert Bruce Cotton, Richard Carew, Richard Martin, and William Strachey. A popular tradition has grown up that the group included William Shakespeare, although most scholars think that was improbable.

== The building ==
According to Jonson, the Tavern was situated on Bread Street ("At Bread Street's Mermaid, having dined and merry..."). It probably had entrances on both Bread Street and Friday Street. The location corresponds to the modern junction between Bread Street and Cannon Street. The tavern's landlord is named as William Johnson in a will dated, 1603.

In 1600, a notable disorder caused by some drunken members of a group known as the Damned Crew attacking the watch after they were challenged, began after they were ejected from the Mermaid Tavern. It resulted in a Star Chamber trial.

The building was destroyed in 1666 during the Great Fire of London.

== Shakespeare and the Sireniacal gentlemen ==
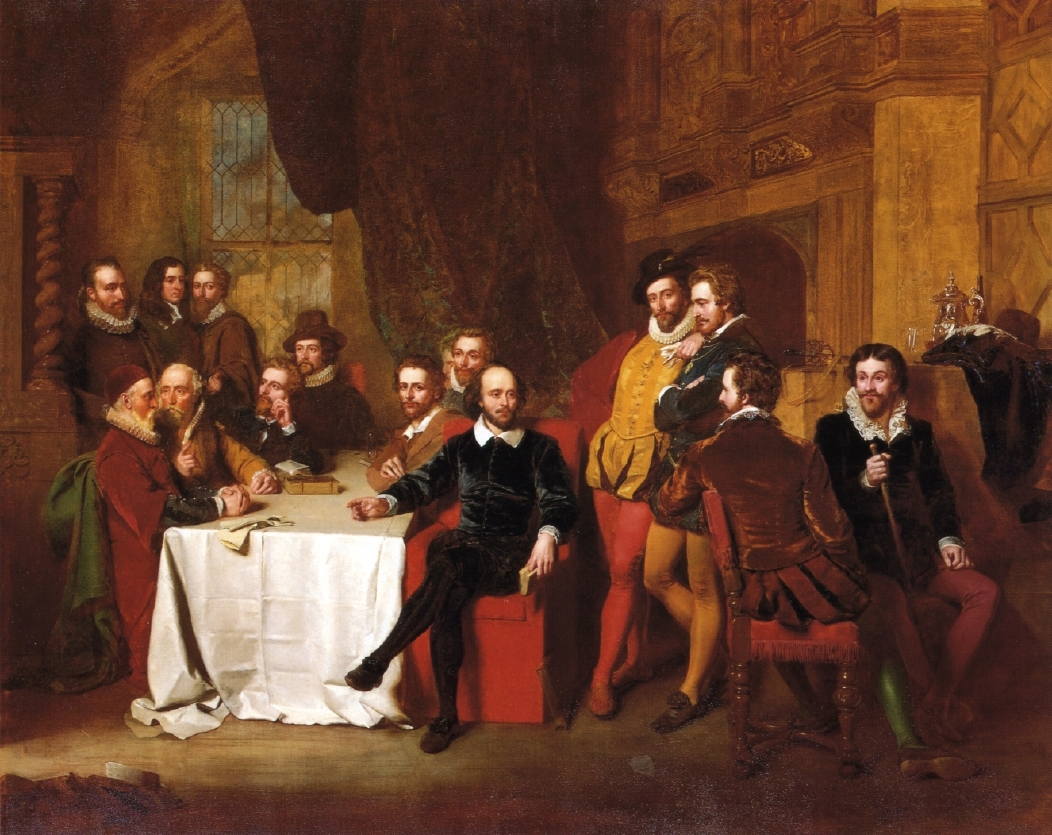
A fanciful 19th-century depiction of Shakespeare and his contemporaries at the Mermaid Tavern. Painting by John Faed, 1851.

William Gifford, Jonson's 19th-century editor, wrote that the society was founded by Sir Walter Raleigh in 1603 based on a note by John Aubrey, but Raleigh was imprisoned in the Tower of London from 19 July of that year until 1616 and it is hardly likely that someone of Raleigh's status and temperament would preside over tavern meetings. Gifford also was the first to name the Mermaid as the site of Jonson and Shakespeare's battle-of-wits debates in which they discussed politics, religion, and literature. According to tradition, Shakespeare, though not as learned as Jonson, often won these debates because Jonson was more ponderous, going off on tangents that did not pertain to the topic at hand. How much of the legend is true is a matter of speculation. There is an extended reference to the Tavern and its witty conversation in Master Francis Beaumont's Letter to Ben Jonson. Coryat's letters also refer to the Tavern and mention Jonson, Donne, Cotton, Inigo Jones, and Hugh Holland – though Coryat was intimate with this group apparently from 1611 on.

Shakespeare certainly had connections with some of the tavern's literary clientele, as well as with the tavern's landlord, William Johnson. When Shakespeare bought the Blackfriars gatehouse on March 10, 1613, Johnson was listed as a trustee for the mortgage. And Hugh Holland, mentioned in Coryat's letters, composed one of the commendatory poems prefacing the First Folio of Shakespeare's plays (1623).

"The Sireniacal gentlemen" also met at the Mitre tavern in London, that seemed to be located nearby. The opening scene of Bartholomew Fair by Ben Jonson (1614) has one of the characters, John Littlewit, refer negatively to those "Canary-drinking" wits who keep company at the ‘Three Cranes, Mitre, and Mermaid’. Apparently they were seen as too elitist. The wine in question seems to be the same as sack.

== Mermaid Tavern in literature ==
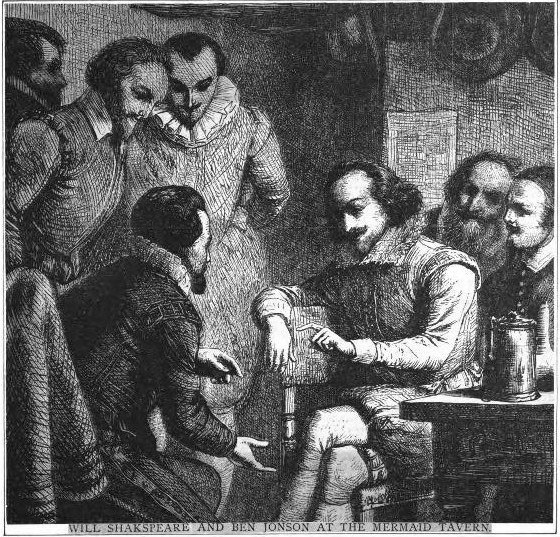
An illustration depicting Shakespeare and Jonson debating at the tavern

Jonson and Beaumont both mentioned the tavern in their verse. Jonson's Inviting a Friend to Supper refers to "A pure cup of rich Canary wine, / Which is the Mermaid's now, but shall be mine". Beaumont, in his verse letter to Jonson, describes "things we have seen done / At the Mermaid", including,

...words that have been
So nimble, and so full of subtle flame,
As if that every one from whence they came,
Had meant to put his whole wit in a jest.

Two hundred years later, in early February 1819, John Keats composed a poem on the legend initiated by Beaumont, Lines on the Mermaid Tavern—26 lines of verse that open and close with the following couplets:

Souls of poets dead and gone,
What Elysium have ye known,
Happy field or mossy cavern,
Choicer than the Mermaid Tavern?

Keats' precedent was followed by Theodore Watts-Dunton in his poem Wassail Chorus at the Mermaid Tavern, a Christmas drinking-song imagined having been sung in the tavern, in which each new verse is "composed" by one of the poet-guests, including Raleigh, Drayton, "Shakespeare's friend", Heywood and Jonson. In his 1908 Prophets, Priests and Kings (p. 323), A. G. Gardiner turned to these "intellectual revels" at the Mermaid Tavern to express the independent genius of his friend G. K. Chesterton:

Time and place are accidents: he is elemental and primitive. He is not of our time, but of all times. One imagines him wrestling with the giant Skrymir and drinking deep draughts from the horn of Thor, or exchanging jests with Falstaff at the Boar's Head in Eastcheap, or joining in the intellectual revels at the Mermaid Tavern, or meeting Johnson foot to foot and dealing blow for a mighty blow. With Rabelais he rioted, and Don Quixote and Sancho were his "vera brithers." One seems to see him coming down from the twilight of fable, through the centuries, calling wherever there is a good company, and welcome wherever he calls, for he brings no cult of the time or pedantry of the schools with him.

Canadian poets William Wilfred Campbell, Archibald Lampman, and Duncan Campbell Scott together wrote a literary column called "At the Mermaid Inn" for the Toronto Globe from February 1892 until July 1893.

In 1913 the ballad poet Alfred Noyes published Tales of the Mermaid Tavern, a long poem in a series of chapters, each dedicated to Elizabethan writers associated with the tavern. These include Jonson, Shakespeare and Marlowe.

Beryl Markham, in her 1942 memoir, West with the Night, remarked that "every man has his Mermaid's Tavern, every hamlet its shrine to conviviality".

== See also ==
- William Stansby
- Mermaid Series
- Affinity group
