= Early fires of London =

Disasters before 1666

The City of London has experienced numerous serious fires in the course of its history.

== Roman ==
=== Boudica's revolt ===
The earliest fire of which there is definitive evidence occurred in 60 AD, during the revolt led by Queen Boudica, whose forces burned the town then known as Londinium to the ground. This fire was so destructive that archaeologists still use the clearly defined layer of ash deposited by the flames to date the strata below the city.

=== The Hadrianic fire ===
Archaeological evidence suggests that some time in the ten years following the visit of Roman emperor Hadrian in AD 122, a huge fire or possibly a series of fires destroyed a 100-acre (0.40 km^{2}) area of the ancient city. Only a handful of the more robust Roman buildings, such as the Roman fort at Cripplegate, survived the flames and the city was largely wiped out.

== Anglo-Saxon ==
Another great fire broke out in London in 675, destroying the Saxon cathedral that was built of wood. The cathedral was rebuilt in stone in the years 675–685. Fires were also reported for 798 and 982. In 989, a fire occurred "that, beginning in Aldgate, burned down houses and churches all the way to Ludgate".

== Norman ==
A major fire occurred in London in 1087, at the beginning of the reign of William Rufus. It consumed much of the Norman city. St Paul's Cathedral was the most significant building to be destroyed in this blaze, which also damaged the Palatine tower built by William the Conqueror on the banks of the River Fleet so badly that the remains had to be pulled down. Part of the stone from the tower was then used in the reconstruction of the cathedral.

== Medieval fires ==
Before 1666, the phrase "Great Fire of London" was generally used by Londoners to denote one of two major conflagrations in the early medieval period.

=== The Great Fire of 1133 ===
The first dates to Pentecost 1133 (14 May), and according to different traditions started either on London Bridge or in the home of the Sheriff of London, Gilbert Becket (Beket), a mercer and father of Thomas Becket. This blaze was so severe that it destroyed most of the city between St Paul's and St Clement Danes in Westminster. The chronicler Matthew Paris records that the fire destroyed St Paul's Cathedral once again, but this was not the case. One indication of the severity of the fire can be seen in assessments of Gilbert Becket's wealth, based largely on his London property, which declined sharply in its aftermath.

=== The Great Fire of 1212 ===
The second of the two great medieval fires of London, also known as "the Great Fire of Suthwark" [sic], began on 10 July 1212 in Southwark, the borough directly to the south of London Bridge. The flames destroyed Our Lady of the Canons (Southwark Cathedral, also known as St Mary Overie) and strong southerly winds pushed them towards the bridge, which also caught fire. London Bridge had only just been rebuilt in stone, and the structure itself survived the blaze. However, King John had authorised the construction of houses on the bridge, the rents from which were supposed to pay for its maintenance, and it appears that these were lost to the flames.

The earliest account of the blaze appears in the Liber de Antiquis Legibus ("Book of Ancient Laws"), composed in 1274 and today the oldest book preserved among the records of the City of London Corporation. This states:

In this year was the Great Fire of Suthwark [sic], and it burned the church of St Mary [Overy], as also the Bridge, with the chapel there, and the great part of the city.

According to later traditions, however, numerous casualties were incurred when a mass of citizens from London rushed onto the bridge at the first signs of fire, intending to cross the river to help extinguish the flames. High winds carried red-hot embers across the river and ignited buildings on the north side of the bridge. This fire trapped a large number of people, many of whom died either in the blaze or while attempting to escape on overloaded boats that had come to their aid. One later chronicle by John Stow in 1598 related:

An exceeding great multitude of people passing the Bridge, either to extinguish or quench it, or else to gaze at and behold it, suddenly the north part, by blowing of the south wind, was also set on fire, and the people which were even now passing the Bridge, perceiving the same, would have returned, but were stopped by the fire.

An account written in 1603 by John Stow put the number of people killed on London Bridge alone at 3,000, and this figure appears in the Guinness Book of Records, although it is not contemporary. Ben Johnson thinks that this is an exaggeration as, at the time, the whole population of London was no more than 50,000 – his rationale for suggesting that 3,000 deaths out of 50,000 is implausible is not, however, explained. Nevertheless, no reliable evidence survives to allow an accurate estimate of the number of casualties caused by the great fire of 1212, but it is known that the damage done to London Bridge was such that the structure remained a ruin, only partially usable, for years afterwards.

== Other notable fires ==
There were other serious fires in London in 1130 and 1132. Further major fires of London are noted in 13th century London in the years 1220, 1227, and 1299, but none that had the impact of the Great Fire of 1212.

Another fire broke out in 1633, destroying 42 premises on the northern third of London Bridge and a further eighty buildings on Thames Street. Some of these buildings were not repaired or replaced, and this accidental "firebreak" prevented the bridge from being damaged by the Great Fire of London three decades later in September 1666.

There was another major fire in 1678.

== Bibliography ==
- Benham, William (1902). Old St Paul's Cathedral. London: Seeley & Co.
- Brooke, Christopher, and Gillian Kerr (1975). London 800–1216: The Shaping of a City. London: Secker & Warburg.
- Hibbert, Christopher (1989). London: The Biography of a City. London: Longmans.
- Lambert, B. (1806). Lambert's History of London. London: T. Hughes. Vol. I pp. 88–89.
- Pearce, Patricia (2001). Old London Bridge: The Story of the Longest Inhabited Bridge in Europe. London: Headline.
- Riley, H. T. (1863). Chronicles of the Mayors & Sheriffs of London AD 1188 to AD 1274. London: Trubner.
- Watson, Bruce (2001). London Bridge: 2,000 Years of a River Crossing. English Heritage Archaeological Service.
