= Hawkubites =

18th-century London gang

The Hawkubites were a gang that supposedly terrorized the city of London from 1711 to 1714, during the reign of Queen Anne. It is claimed that the Hawkubites beat up women, children, watchmen, and old men in the streets after dark. They preceded the dreaded Mohocks.

== Reverend Divine's pamphlet ==
A pamphlet of the time by a "Reverend Divine" was An Argument, proving from History, Reason, and Scripture, that the present Race of Mohocks and Hawke-bites are the Gog and Magog mentioned in the Revelations; and therefore that this vain and transitory World will shortly be brought to its final Dissolution. Divine claimed to have taken his words "from the Mouth of the Spirit of a Person who was slain by the Mohocks".

The "victim" in the pamphlet, called the "Spirit", writes that "I am the porter that was barbarously slain in Fleet Street. - By the Mohocks and Hawkubites was I slain, when they laid violent hands upon me. They put their hook into my mouth, they divided my nostrils asunder, they sent me, as they thought, to my long home; but now I am returned again to foretell their destruction." He goes on to write:

From Mohock and from Hawkubite,
Good Lord, deliver me!
Who wander through the streets at night,
Committing cruelty.
They slash our sons with bloody knives,
And on our daughters fall;
And if they murder not our wives,
We have good luck withal
Coaches and chairs they overturn,
Nay, carts most easily;
Therefore from Gog and Magog,
Good Lord, deliver me!
