= Damned Crew =

Early modern London street gang

The Damned Crew, or Cursed Crew, was a group of young gentlemen in late 16th and early 17th century London noted for habitually swaggering drunk through the streets, assaulting passers-by and watchmen. The earliest certain reference to such a group appears in a sermon preached by Stephen Gosson at St Paul's Cross on 7 May 1598, when he claimed that a gang of roisterers of that name – "menne without feare, or feeling, eyther of Hell or Heauen, delighting in that title" – had all been drowned together when the boat in which they were sailing down the Thames had been upset near Gravesend. Another, possibly earlier reference, is in the work of the pamphleteer Thomas Nashe, who in 1592 described a vain young man attempting to give himself an air of singularity by wearing his hat pulled low over his eyes “like one of the cursed crue”.

By 1600 a leading member of the Damned Crew was Sir Edmund Baynham (1577 - 1642?), a disaffected Catholic later implicated in the Essex rebellion and the Gunpowder Plot. Baynham had originally been admitted to the Middle Temple in 1595 to study law but soon switched to adventuring. He followed the Earl of Essex on his ill-fated expedition to Ireland and was knighted there by him "on the sands" just before Essex returned to England. Thereafter, Baynham was among Essex's most loyal supporters.

On the night of Tuesday March 18, 1600 Baynham and some others left the Mermaid Tavern at midnight and set off apparently looking for trouble. They "cast off their cloaks and upper garments, drew rapiers and daggers, marched through the streets" and when challenged by the watch they attacked. After a scuffle they were overpowered, disarmed and marched to the Counter prison, Baynham shouting that "he cared not a fart for the lord mayor or any magistrate in London." Instead of being tried by the ordinary London authorities however they were remitted to Star Chamber on the personal intervention of the Queen, "for the more exemplar punishment of so great and outrageous disorder." Having at first denied the charges they changed their plea to guilty, "confessed their faults and submitted themselves to the court, and proved that all was done in drink and heat." They were fined £200 and imprisoned.

A contemporary satirical poem, The letting of humors blood in the head-veine by Samuel Rowlands, describes the triumph of the watch and the discomfiture of the Damned Crew.
