= Norman and medieval London =

English municipal history (1066–1485)

- 1066–1485
Anglo-Saxon London	Tudor London
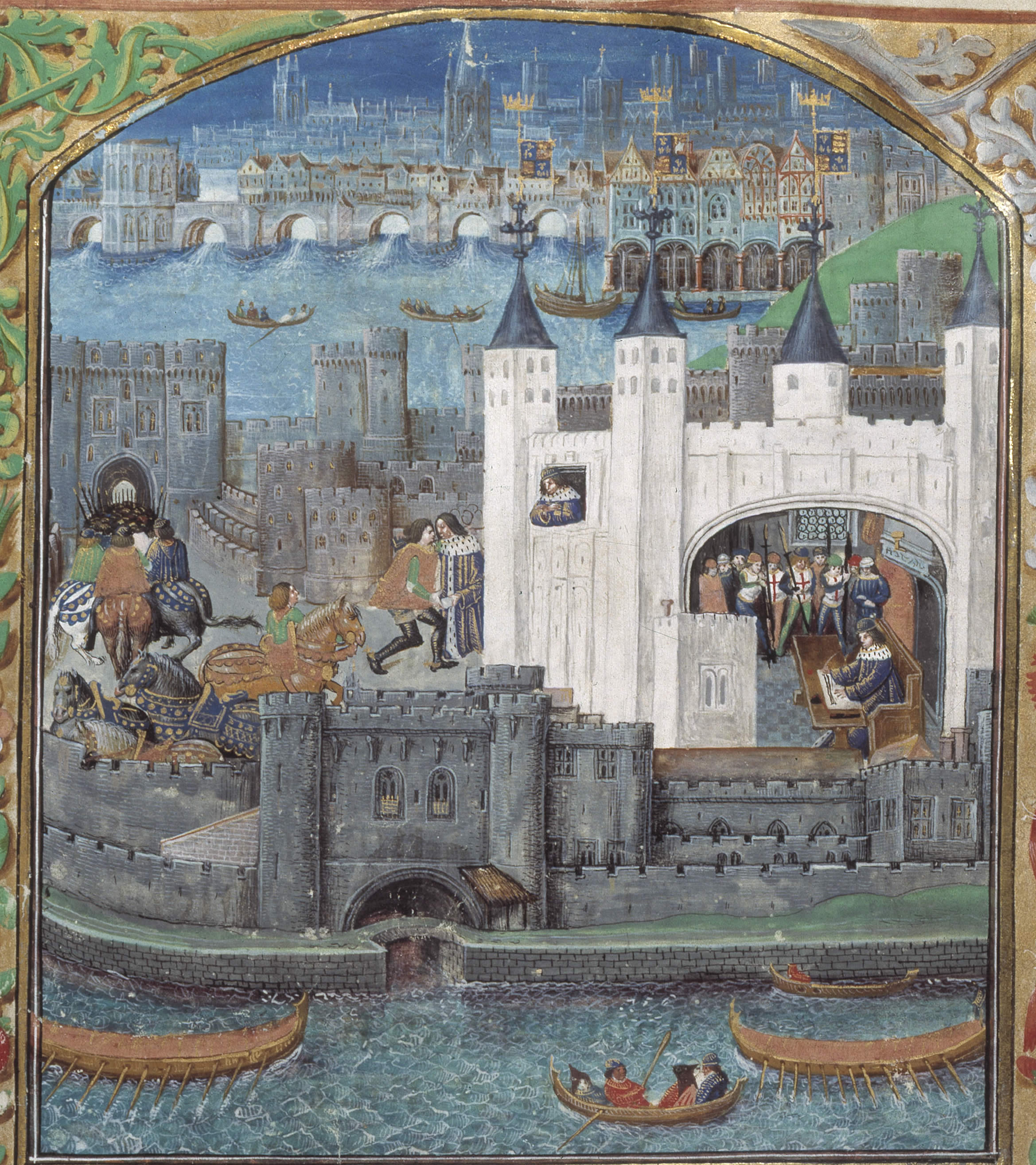
- London as depicted in a 15th-century manuscript, showing the Tower of London, the River Thames, and London Bridge.
- Location: London
- Monarch(s): William I, William II, Henry I, King Stephen, Henry II, Richard I, King John, Henry III, Edward I, Edward II, Edward III, Richard II, Henry IV, Henry V, Henry VI, Edward IV, Edward V, Richard III

In London, the Norman period began with the Norman conquest of England in 1066, and the medieval period ended with the death of Richard III in 1485. During this period, Westminster became the capital of England, as monarchs held Parliament at the Palace of Westminster from 1265. London's population increased, reaching a height of 80,000-100,000 by around 1300: three times the size of the next largest city in England. The official boundary of the city was much smaller than today, covering just the square mile within the city walls, although there were also built-up areas in Westminster, Southwark, and Spitalfields.

This period saw a dramatic increase in church-building, with over 100 churches within the city walls by the 12th century. The Tower of London and Old London Bridge were also built in this period. Londoners were instrumental in numerous armed conflicts, including The Anarchy, the Barons' Wars, the Peasants' Revolt, Jack Cade's Rebellion, and the Wars of the Roses.

The city's population massively decreased in the 14th century due to the effects of the Great Famine and the Black Death. However, the period also saw the institution of London's oldest surviving hospitals- St Thomas' and St. Bartholomew's, as well as the lunatic asylum St Mary Bethlehem.

London appointed its first recorded Lord Mayor in this period, Henry FitzAilwin, in 1189. Famous figures from British history, such as the writer Geoffrey Chaucer and the saint Thomas Becket, were born in London. In the 12th century, the writer William Fitzstephen described it as florilegium urbanum — "flower of cities".

== Demography ==
In the 1070s, London's population has been estimated at 18,000. The high point of London's population for this period is around 1300, when the population reached 80,000-100,000. This was greatly reduced following outbreaks of plague in the 14th century, and London's population has been estimated at 40,000 in 1377. This was over three times the size of the next largest English city, York, but smaller than other European cities such as Paris, Rome, Venice and Bruges. 90% of Londoners died before the age of 45, although wealthier people were more likely to live to 70 or 80. On average, London men grew to a height of 5 ft 7 1/2 in (171.5 cm) and London women to 5 ft 3 in (160 cm).

London was a centre of England's Jewish population. There was a Jewish burial ground at Jewin Street, on the site of the modern-day Barbican Centre, from 1177, Old Jewry was known as the Jewish quarter from 1181, and London's first synagogue is on Ironmonger Lane, being first recorded in 1227 and forced to close in 1285. In the 13th century, one member of the community was chosen as Presbyter Judaeorum, or "chief of the Jews", with the physician Elias of London being one notable holder of the post. After Jews were expelled from the country by the 1290 Edict of Expulsion, there was only one legal way for Jews to remain in England, which was to convert to Christianity. There was an almshouse called the Domus Conversorum on Chancery Lane for converted Jews, who were still banned from entering into trades and therefore dependent on charity.

Several communities of foreign merchants were resident in London, including French wine merchants, and Danish and German traders. London also received visitors from further afield, such as Heraclius, the Patriarch of Jerusalem, in 1185, and the Byzantine emperor Manuel II Palaiologos in 1400.

== Topography ==
The only parts of what is now known as Greater London that were built up were the City of London and Westminster, and indeed the outlying areas were not yet considered to be part of London itself. The City of London was surrounded by 18-feet-high city walls, with six gatehouses at Aldersgate, Aldgate, Bishopsgate, Cripplegate, Ludgate and Newgate which could be shut in defence if necessary. In 1415, a new gate was added to the northern wall by a marsh, which came to be known as Moorgate. Outside the wall was a protective ditch, which is still remembered in the street name Houndsditch. Within the walls, streets were narrow, and London had no large, open gathering place or square. London's main market street was Cheapside, which is first mentioned as "Westceape" in 1067. Westminster lay to the city's west, and was the location of the Palace of Westminster and Westminster Abbey. The border between the two was marked as Temple Bar in around 1161. Between them lay Fleet Street and the Strand, which in 1175 was already being described as a "continuous suburb".

The built-up area had only one bridge across the River Thames: London Bridge, although there were also bridges outside the city at Bow (said to be the first stone bridge in England), Kingston upon Thames, Fulham, and Brentford. London also had many smaller rivers and tributaries which are now entirely underground, such as the Walbrook and the Fleet. The Walbrook began to be covered over as early as 1300, and had disappeared completely underground by the end of the period.

Outside of the City and Westminster, London had large forests such as the Forest of Middlesex (today Highgate Wood and Queen's Wood), North Wood (today Norwood), and Waltham Forest (today Epping Forest). There were villages in what is now Greater London at St Pancras, Mortlake, and Camberwell. There were boroughs (fortified settlements) at Fulham, Barking, Waltham, Bermondsey, and Lambeth. There were also estates, owned by great lords and the Church, and worked by farmers, such as at Chelsea (owned by Edward of Salisbury in 1086), Stepney (owned by the Bishop of London), Hampstead and Battersea (owned by Westminster Abbey), Marylebone and Tyburn (owned by Barking Abbey).

=== Buildings ===
This period saw a great deal of new church building and rebuilding of older churches, and by the 12th century there were over 100 churches within the city walls alone — one for every 300 inhabitants. St. Paul's Cathedral, although existing before this period, was rebuilt as what is now known as Old St. Paul's in this period, begun in the 12th century and finished in 1314. The church of St. Bartholomew-the-Great was founded in 1123 and remains one of the few remaining churches built in the Norman style of architecture in London. The first London church built in the Gothic style of architecture was Temple Church, which was consecrated in 1185. Westminster Abbey predates this period, but most of the current building dates from the 13th and 14th centuries, when the earlier abbey was mostly pulled down and rebuilt at great expense as a place for kings to be buried.

London had three castles constructed in this period. The centre of the Tower of London, the White Tower, was constructed under William I in the 1070s, with most of the fabric of the modern Tower added in the 13th century. London's two other castles, Baynard's Castle and Montfichet's Tower, may have also been begun under William I. There was also some fortification at the Palace of Westminster, the only part of which remains is the 14th-century Jewel Tower.

As London became more politically important in this period, it acquired grand government halls. Westminster Hall was built 1097–1099, with the roof added in the 1390s. It was the Great Hall of the Palace of Westminster, originally built as a place for the king to reside rather than a meeting place for Parliament, although it also encompassed government meeting rooms and the Royal Courts of Justice. London's Guildhall existed on its present site from at least 1284, but the current hall dates from 1411, and when it was built, was one of the largest in the country, second only to Westminster Hall.

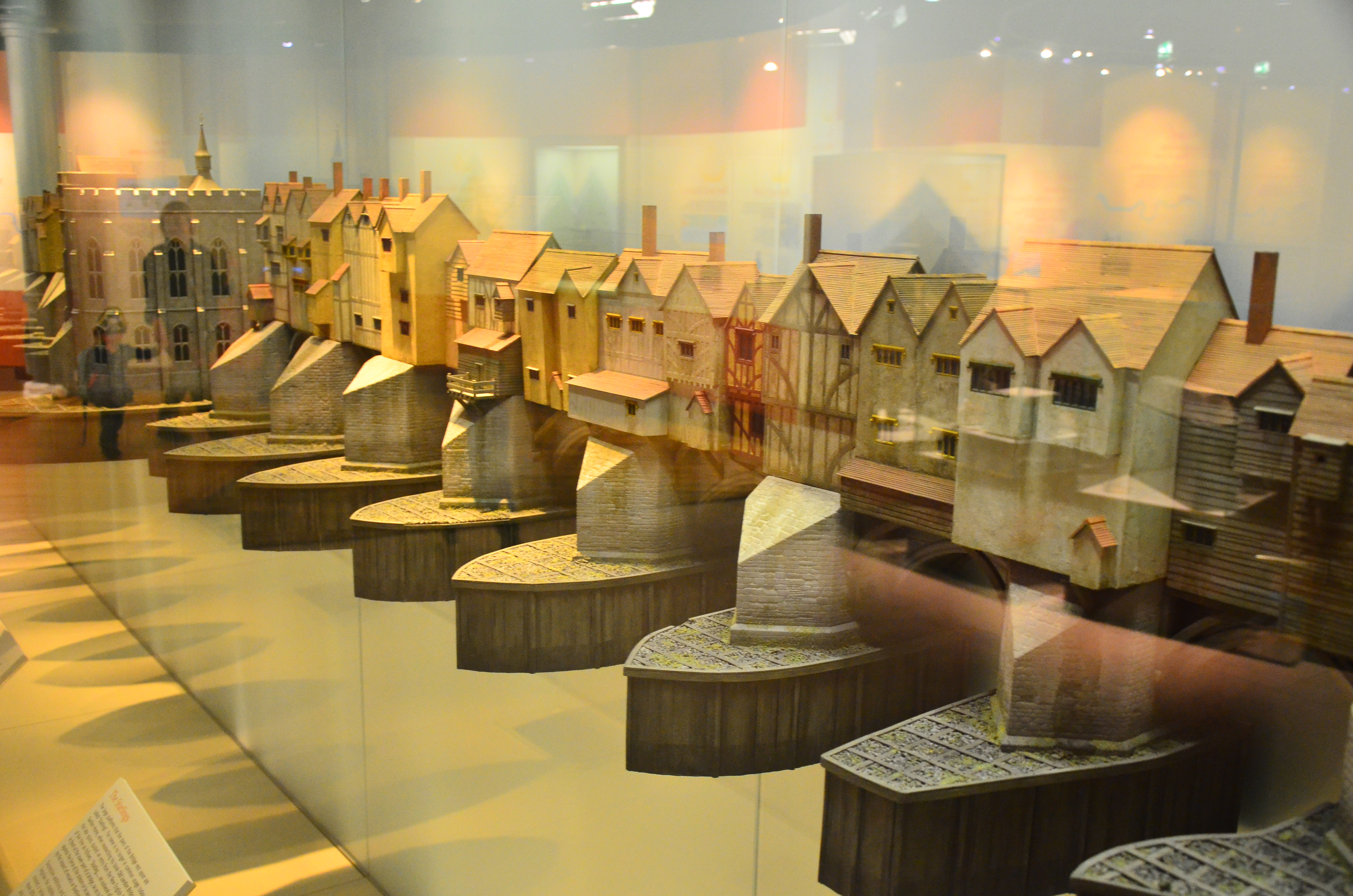
A model of London Bridge as it appeared in 1440

Although a wooden bridge existed prior to this period in the location of today's London Bridge, a stone version was completed in 1209, designed by master builder Peter of Colechurch. It had a portcullis at the southern end to keep out attackers, and was covered in houses on either side, several storeys high and hanging out over the side of the bridge. In the centre was a chapel dedicated to St. Thomas Becket. The piers of the bridge were so large that they created very dangerous currents, meaning many boatmen refused to pilot underneath the bridge.

As a wealthy and important place, lots of palaces and private mansions were also built in and around London. The Savoy Palace was a mansion situated in the Strand which was originally built for Robert de Beaumont, Earl of Leicester in 1189, and occupied by Peter, Count of Savoy from 1246. It was destroyed in the Peasants' Revolt of 1381. Eltham Palace was built 1296-1311 for Antony Bek, the Bishop of Durham. There was a grand manor house at Sheen (now Richmond) which was enlarged under the reigns of Edward III and Henry V. In 1433, Humphrey, Duke of Gloucester began building work on what would become Greenwich Palace. In the 1460s, Crosby Hall was built near Bishopsgate for a London merchant, which has since been moved wholesale to its present site in Chelsea.

In 1290, Queen Eleanor of Castile died in Nottinghamshire, and her body was brought to London for burial in Westminster Abbey. Wherever the cortege stopped overnight, a cross was built, including two in London- Cheapside Cross and Charing Cross.

In 1427, a Great Barn was built at Harmondsworth to store grain, which can still be seen today.

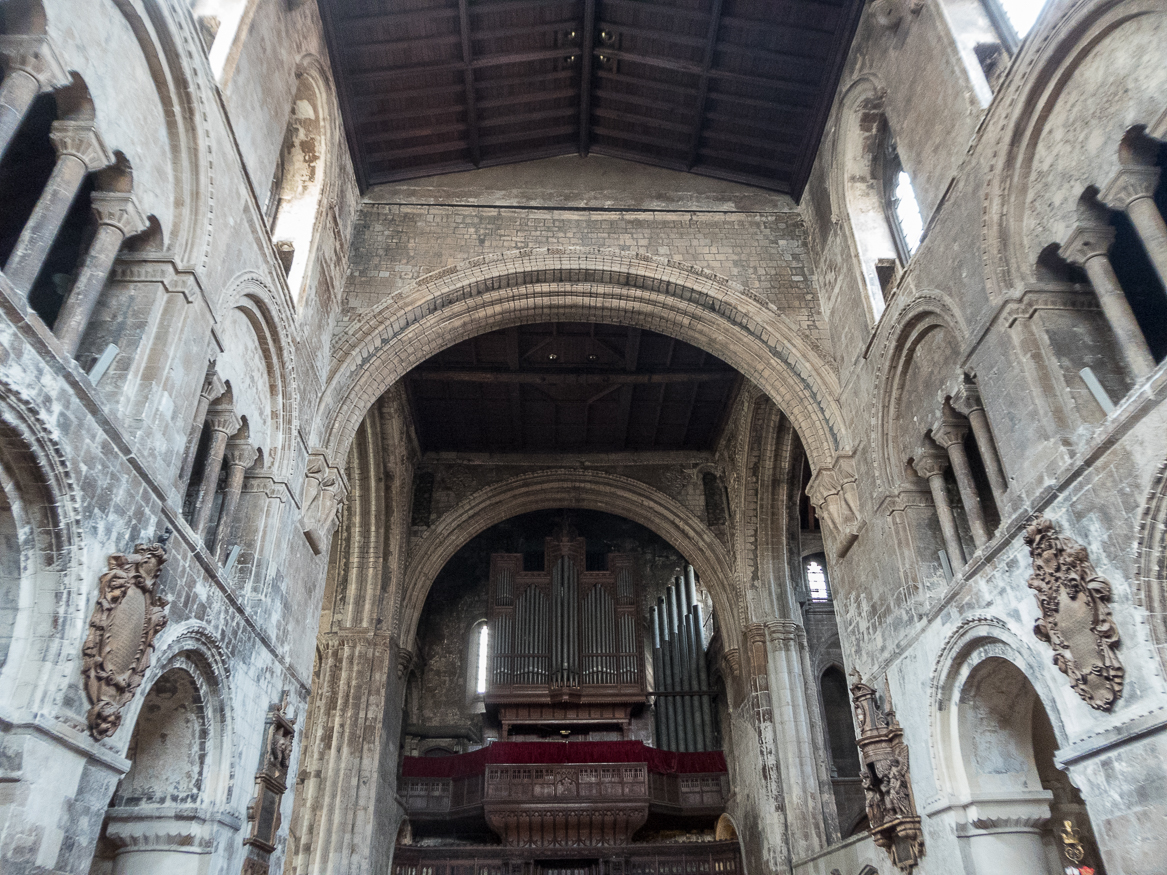
The interior of St. Bartholomew-the-Great, founded in 1123, with rounded arches indicative of the Norman style

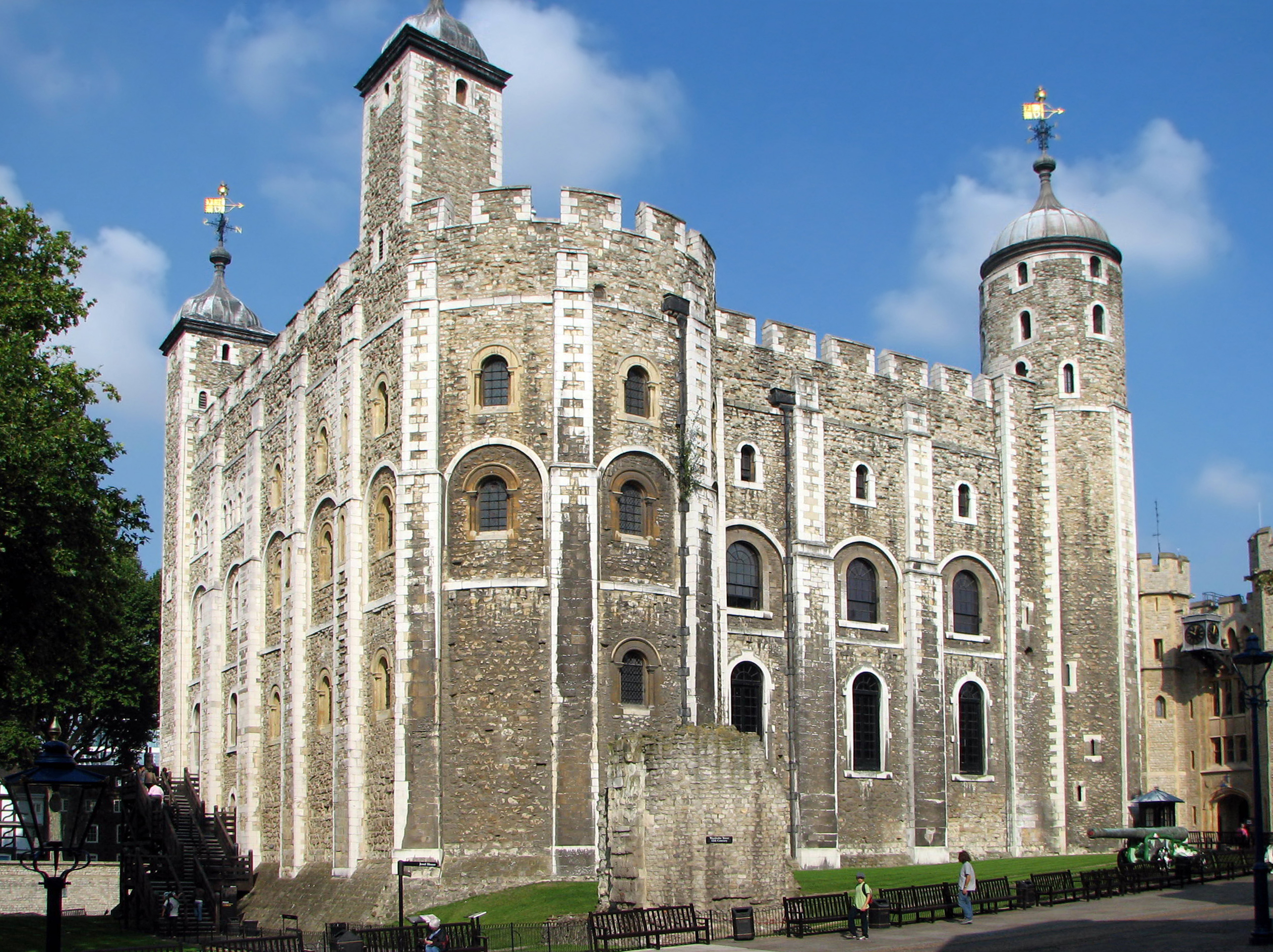
The White Tower of the Tower of London, built in the late 11th century

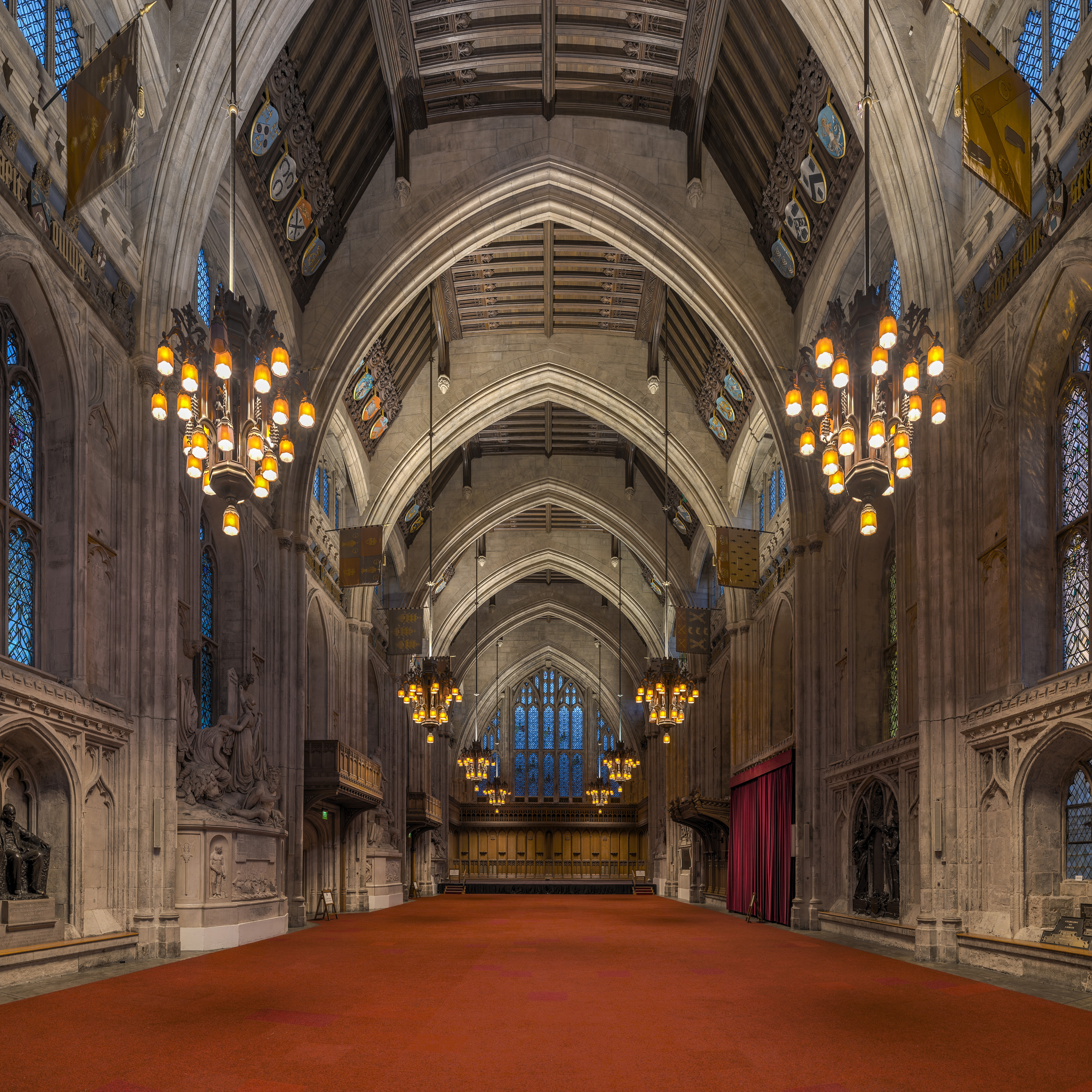
London's Guildhall, built in the 15th century

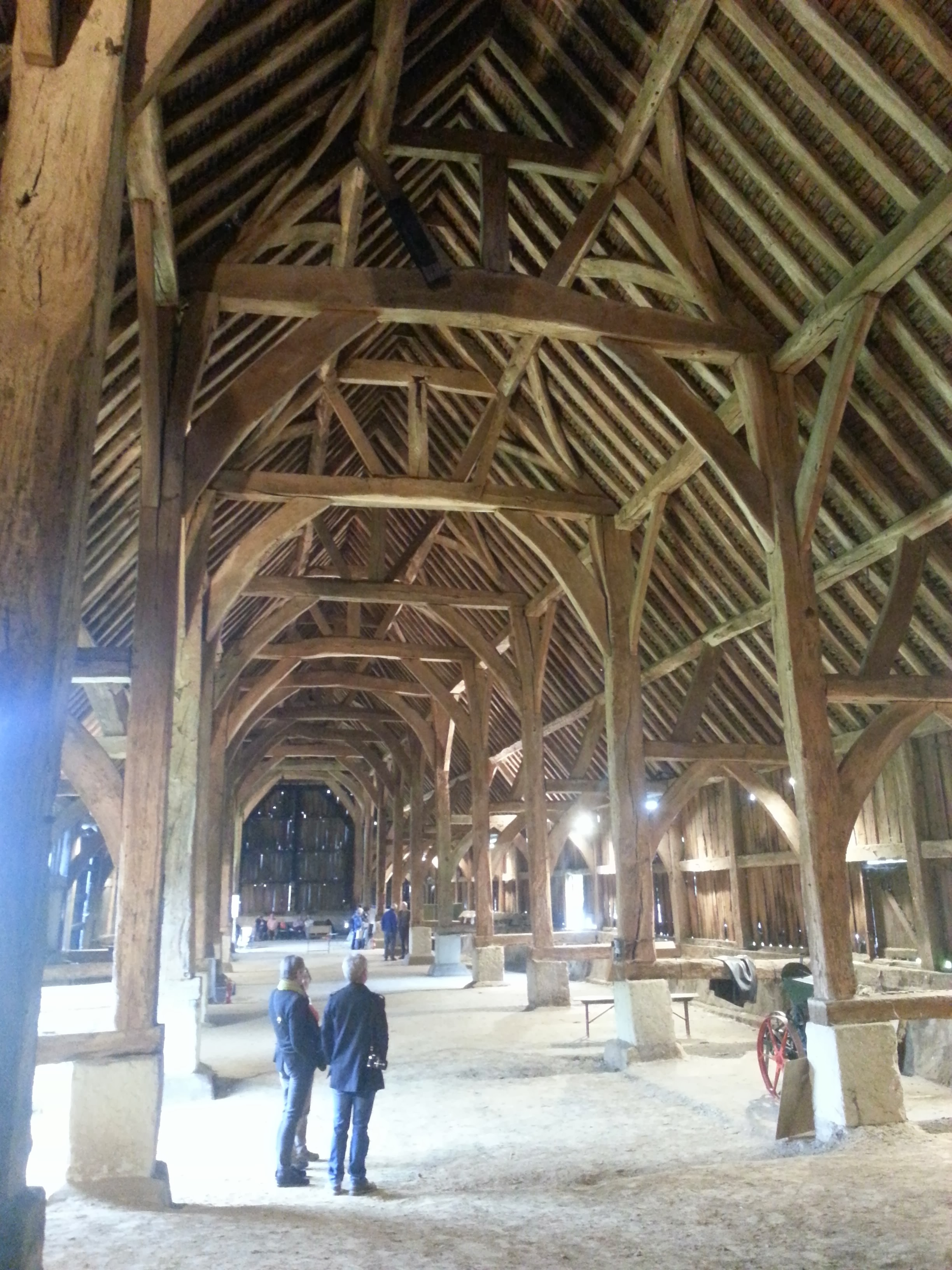
The interior of Harmondsworth Great Barn, a farm building from 1426

=== Building destruction ===
London suffered several large fires in this period. St. Paul's Cathedral was destroyed in a fire in 1087. The largest fire of the period was probably the Great Fire of 1212, which began in Southwark on 10 July. It crossed the river, trapping people on London Bridge. Some tried to jump off the bridge into boats, sometimes drowning or sinking boats in the process along with their crews. The fire reached the north bank, where it burned a large area. An estimated 3,000 people died in the fire of 1212.

== Governance ==
At the beginning of the period, London was not yet considered the capital of the country, the city of Winchester being more commonly associated with royalty. However, in the 11th century, there was a great fire in Winchester, and several royal offices decamped to London, never to return. By the 1150s, London was called le chef d'Angleterre — the "chief city" — and was the largest city in the country. The treasury was the last royal department to move, doing so in the reign of Henry II in the 12th century. Four times a year, sheriffs from all over the country arrived at this department to deliver the taxes they had raised in the previous months. As addition was done using Roman numerals, and the money was in pounds, shillings and pence, the officials used a chequered cloth as an abacus to help count the money, giving the department the name "exchequer". In 1236, Henry III called a meeting at Merton Priory which has been called England's first Parliament, and which resulted in the Statute of Merton.

At the beginning of the period, London was governed by an officer of the Crown called a portreeve and the Bishop of London. London appointed its first recorded mayor, Henry FitzAilwin, in 1189, and the right of the city to have a mayor, aldermen and its own court, was confirmed in Magna Carta, a treaty agreed to by King John in 1215. In 1193, one person wrote, "Londoners shall have no king but their mayor." In fact, London's mayor was a person of such importance that the mayor of 1215 was the only commoner to put his seal to Magna Carta. In 1351, the title was elevated to "Lord Mayor" in order to emphasise the authority of the position after carrying a sword within the walls was banned. The city is split into sections called wards, and each ward is represented by aldermen. London's aldermen are the ones who elect the mayor. Unlike today's Lord Mayors, who only serve for one year, medieval mayors often served for several terms, either consecutively or not. The king did revoke Londoners' right to choose their own mayor on occasion, replacing the elected mayor with a royal Warden of the city. For example, London was given a royal warden between 1265 and 1298, after which the city was allowed to purchase its right to elect a mayor again for 2,000 marks.

The first mention of London's Guildhall is in 1128, and by 1220 a building exists close to its present location in St. Lawrence Jewry. From here, the city's administrators could have offices and store important documents.

== War and revolt ==
=== Norman Conquest ===
The period began with England being invaded by William of Normandy, later William I, in 1066. London had declared a Saxon man called Edgar Atheling king, but William arrived in Southwark with his army, According to the writer William of Jumieges, his army caused "no little mourning to the City because of the very many deaths of her own sons and citizens". The leaders of London swore fealty to William, and in return, William promised that London would keep its status and privileges in the William Charter. He was crowned at Westminster Abbey later that year. In order to ensure the co-operation of the city, William had three castles built around London: Montfichet's Tower, Baynard's Castle, and the Tower of London. Large pieces of land were granted to William's Norman supporters, including Harmondsworth, which was given to Rouen Abbey in 1069.

In 1080, the forces of Bishop Odo attacked London in an attempt to oust William II.

=== The Anarchy ===
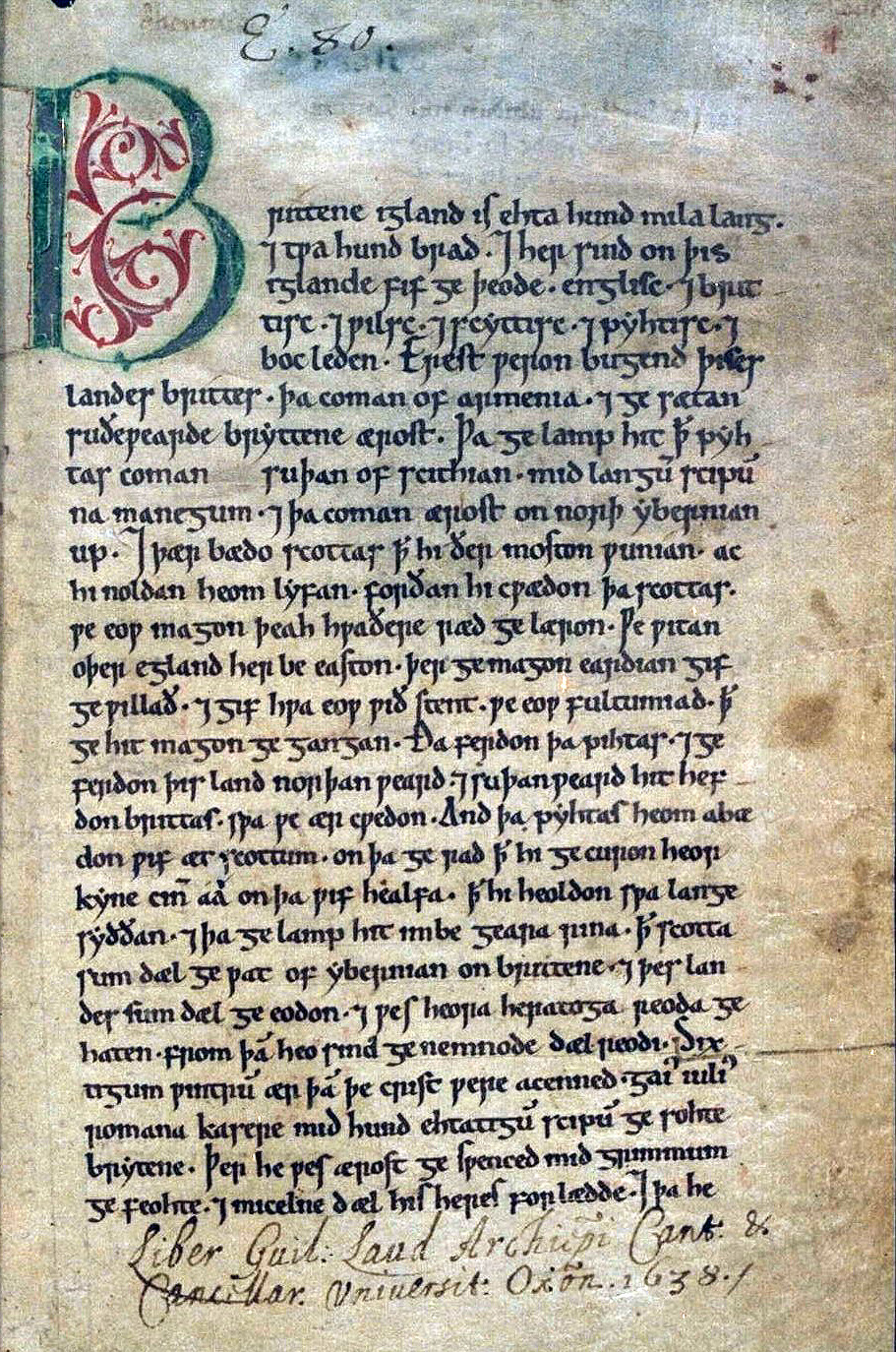
A page from the Anglo-Saxon Chronicle, detailing The Anarchy

In 1135, Henry I died with only one surviving child: a daughter, Matilda, whom he had made his heir. However, Matilda was not in England at the time of her father's death, and so her cousin, Stephen, had himself crowned king instead, supported by the citizens of London. Throughout the following period of civil war known as The Anarchy, London remained loyal to Stephen. Stephen resided in the easily-defensible Tower of London in 1140, but in 1141 he left and was captured in Lincoln. The City sent delegates to bargain for his release, but were unsuccessful. In June, Matilda arrived in London for her coronation, but was driven out by angry Londoners. They proceeded to attack her ally Geoffrey de Mandeville, Earl of Essex at the Tower, who promptly switched allegiance to Stephen.

=== King Richard ===
In 1191, the country was ruled by Richard I, who was often abroad fighting in wars. In his absence, the Bishop of Ely William de Longchamp, and Richard's brother Prince John, fought each other for control of England. On 7 October, John marched on London, while Longchamp secured himself in the Tower. John promised the City its corporate rights and the status of a "commune", and in return, the City sided with John. In 1194, Richard was captured and ransomed for the huge sum of 150,000 marks, to be paid by the English taxpayer. Two years later, a man called William Fitz Osbert alleged that the City authorities had dodged this tax, leaving the burden to fall upon ordinary Londoners. Fighting broke out, during which Fitz Osbert killed one of the king's men. He fled to St. Mary-le-Bow church to claim sanctuary, but was dragged out and executed at Smithfield.

=== Barons' Wars ===
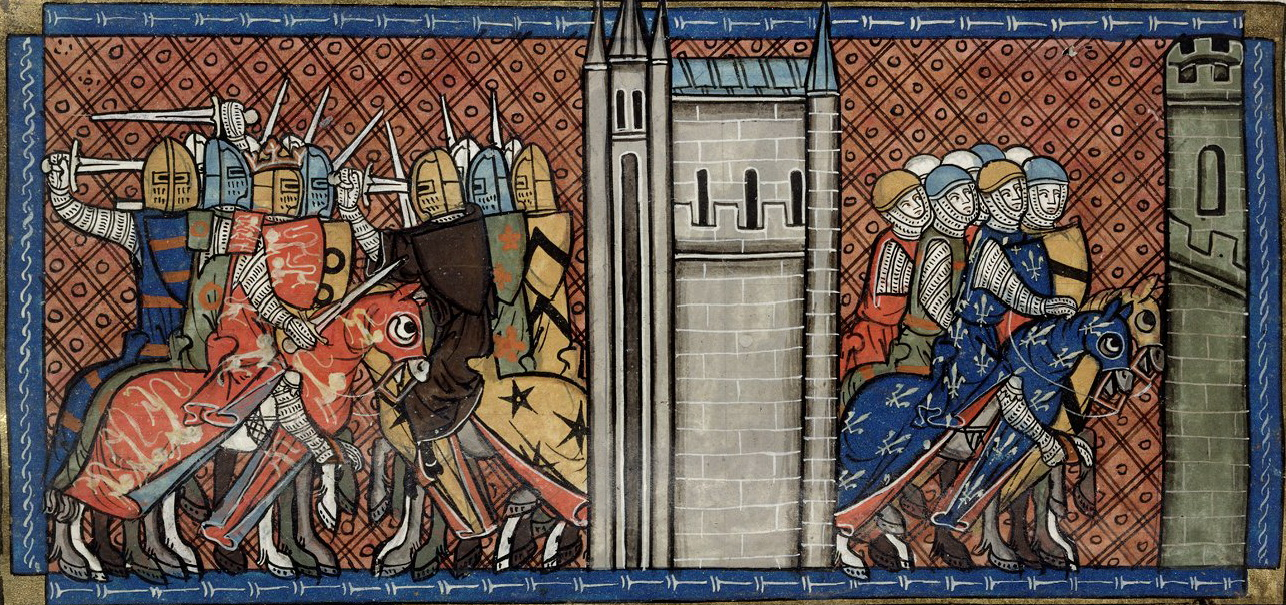
A 14th-century manuscript showing King John's forces fighting the Franks (left) and Prince Louis' forces (right)

Throughout the 13th and 14th-century barons' wars, London generally supported rebel forces against kings such as King John, Henry III, and Edward II. During the reign of King John in the 1210s, the king's enemies attacked the London homes of the king's supporters and London's Jewish population, who were thought to be his financial backers. They also laid siege to the Tower. Later that year, the king was forced to agree to the barons' terms as set out in Magna Carta, which was celebrated by a jousting tournament at Harrow. However, John reneged on these promises, and so next year, the barons offered the crown of England to the French Prince Louis. Louis arrived in England with an army, and once again, Londoners let them in the gates, although Louis later negotiated his safe passage to France in return for giving up his claim to the English throne.

During the 1263 revolt led by Simon de Montfort, Earl of Leicester, called the Second Barons' War, Henry III fled to the Tower while his son, Prince Edward, arrived with an army, looted Temple Church, and stole £10,000 of the city's money. In retaliation, Londoners attacked the houses of his allies and threw things at Henry's queen, Eleanor of Provence, as she sailed underneath London Bridge. De Montfort took shelter in London, which was loyal to the barons. In 1264, London's army was involved in clashes at Isleworth and Norbury, but the king's forces prevailed in 1265 at the Battle of Evesham. Afterwards, London was punished for supporting the rebels. It was governed by the king's warden for five years; the Lord Mayor, Thomas Fitzthomas, was imprisoned; the city was fined, and the property of 60 Londoners was confiscated. However, in 1267, Gilbert de Clare, Earl of Gloucester led another rebellion, and was able to negotiate some concessions from the king.

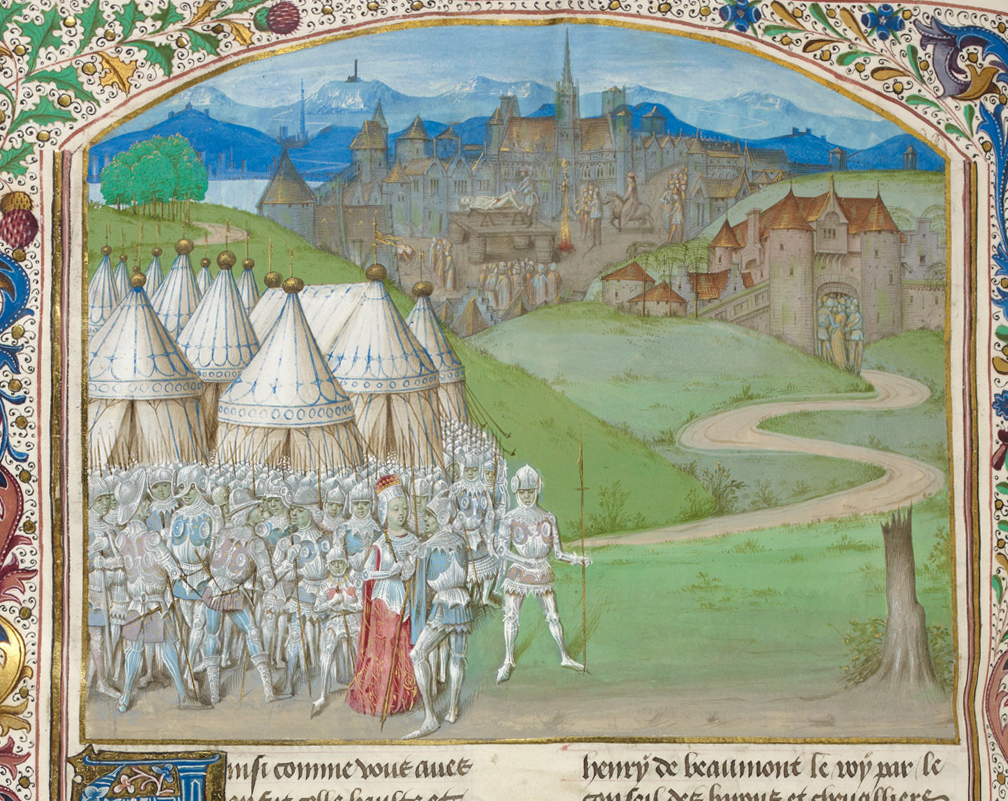
Queen Isabella's army gathers outside London. In the middle distance, Roger Mortimer is being executed, and in the far distance, St. Paul's Cathedral can be seen.

In 1326, Edward II's wife, Queen Isabella of France, and her partner, Roger Mortimer, Earl of March, went into open rebellion against the king in the London Uprising. Many Londoners supported her, and beheaded the king's allies on Cheapside, leaving the corpses in the middle of the road. The rebellion was successful, and the king's underage son, Edward III, was crowned instead, under the control of the Queen and Mortimer. In 1330, Edward III had Mortimer hanged, drawn and quartered in London.

=== Peasants' Revolt ===
The rebels of the 1381 Peasants' Revolt meet at Blackheath, as depicted around a hundred years later in Froissart's Chronicles. The preacher John Ball is shown in the centre, riding a horse, and Wat Tyler is depicted wearing a black hat, left.

Richard II was a child king, governed by his main adviser, John of Gaunt, Duke of Lancaster. In order to raise money, he instituted a poll tax, where all those taxed paid the same amount, regardless of their income. This was a much bigger imposition on poor peasants than on wealthy earls and merchants, and a non-payment campaign started in the nearby counties of Essex and Kent. On 13 June 1381, the two rebels convened at Blackheath, and marched on London. They went to Southwark and released prisoners in Marshalsea Prison, and then crossed London Bridge to ransack John of Gaunt's home at the Savoy Palace. They also attacked the priory of the Knights Hospitaller, Newgate Prison, and the Tower of London, where they found another unpopular figure, Simon Sudbury. They dragged Sudbury out of the Tower and beheaded him on Tower Hill. On 15 June, the king and the Lord Mayor of London, William Walworth, went to meet one of the rebel leaders, Wat Tyler, at Smithfield. Walworth killed Tyler, and the rebellion was put down.

=== Jack Cade's Rebellion ===
In 1450, a rebellion formed against high tax rates and unpopular royal officials like the sheriff of Kent William Cromer and James Fiennes, Lord Saye and Sele. On the 1st June, the rebels assembled at Blackheath, led by a man called Jack Cade. They moved to Sevenoaks, where they won a victory against the king's forces, and on the 3rd July, entered London via Southwark. Both Cromer and Fiennes were found and executed. After a few days of fighting, the king issued pardons to the rebels and they dispersed back to their homes, but these pardons were not honoured and rebels were later rounded up and hanged, including Cade himself, who died en route back to London. His body was beheaded and quartered in Southwark, and his head put on a spike at the end of London Bridge.

=== Wars of the Roses ===
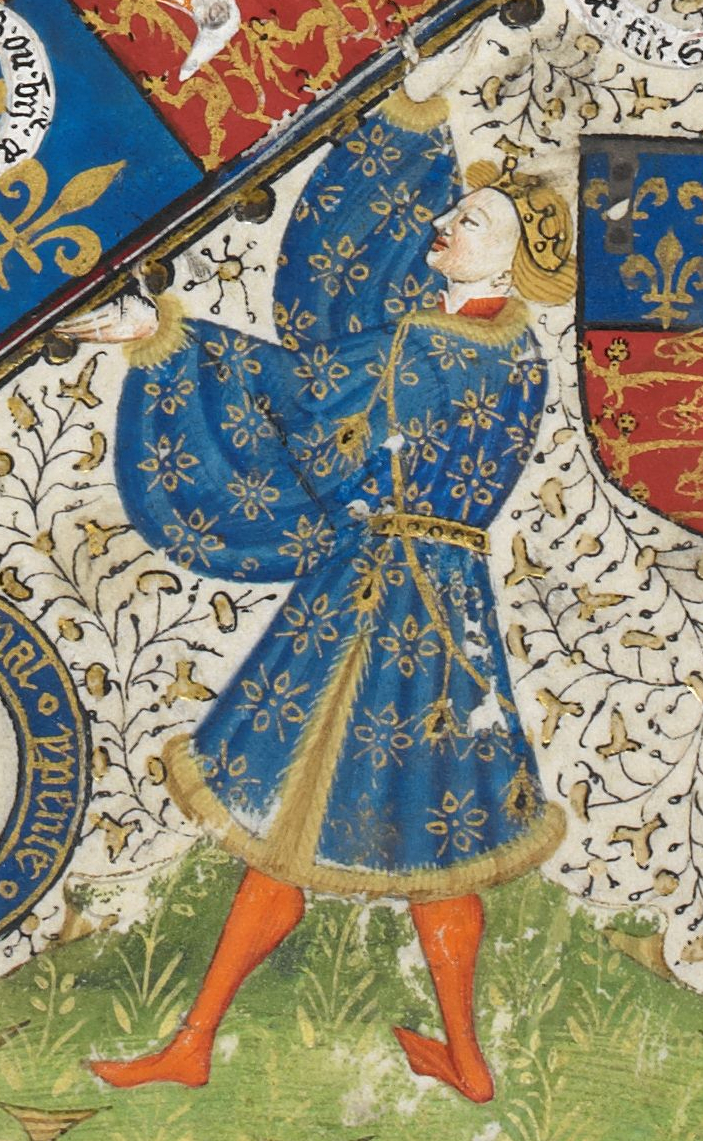
Richard of York, depicted in the Talbot Shrewsbury Book, made in the 1440s

In the 1450s, as Henry VI's mental health deteriorated, nobles in his court began fighting for power amongst themselves. In 1452, Richard of York brought an army to London to fight the king's favourite, Edmund Beaufort, Duke of Somerset, only to find that London was backing Somerset and the gates were closed to him. In 1454, York marched on London again, but this time London attempted to remain neutral, and York became the king's regent, with Somerset thrown in prison. After Yorkist forces besieged the Tower in 1460, the king was forced to name York his heir.

With the king often indisposed, his wife Margaret of Anjou often commanded forces in his name. In 1461, she demanded that London provide her army with provisions under threat of ransacking the city. London officials loaded up carts to head towards her army, but as they were about to leave, they heard news that Richard of York's son, Edward, had won a victory and was heading towards London, and the carts were stopped. London cast aside its neutrality and pivoted entirely to supporting the Yorkist cause. Margaret of Anjou was forced to retreat, and Edward was welcomed into London and crowned King Edward IV in Westminster Abbey. Henry VI was imprisoned in the Tower.

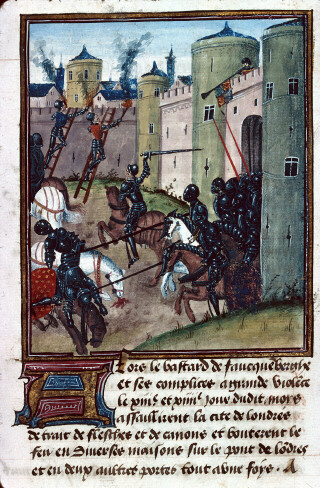
Thomas Neville's men on ladders besieging London, while Edward IV's forces ride out from the city gates

By 1470, however, the tide of the war had turned again. Former allies of Edward such as the George Plantagenet, the Duke of Clarence and Richard Neville, the Earl of Warwick, switched sides, and Edward found himself imprisoned. Warwick marched on London and Edward's wife, Elizabeth Woodville, took her children to the safety of Westminster Abbey, where she gave birth to the future Edward V. With Henry VI imprisoned and Edward IV fled to Europe, Warwick was now in a position to choose which would be restored to the throne, and he chose Henry. However, the next year, Edward IV returned with an army to meet Warwick's forces at the decisive Battle of Barnet. Due to a heavy mist, Warwick's forces attacked each other and Warwick himself was killed. Edward then defeated an uprising by a captain called Thomas Neville at Kingston-upon-Thames, and marched into London victorious on 21 May 1471. Henry VI was murdered in the Tower on the same day.

After 12 years of rule, Edward IV died, leaving his 12-year-old son to become Edward V. The young king and his eight-year-old brother, Richard of Shrewsbury, Duke of York, moved into the Tower to prepare for a coronation, but the ceremony never took place, and instead, Edward IV's brother instead crowned himself Richard III. Many historians have assumed that Richard III had the "Princes in the Tower" murdered.

== Health and medicine ==
Famines and disease outbreaks in London occurred intermittently throughout this period. According to one report, during the famine of 1258 Londoners fought over dead birds and dogs to eat, and 20,000 died. In the Great Famine of 1316, bread prices in London doubled, and one chronicler said that "the poor people stole children and ate them". London was particularly badly hit by the Black Death in 1348, an outbreak of the bubonic plague which at its height killed 200 Londoners per day. Londoners did not know what caused the plague or how it was spread, but some thought it to be airborne and caused by bad smells, which could be blocked by burning fragrant wood or sealing up the windows. Others thought that the disease was a punishment from God. Scientists now understand that the disease is spread by fleas that, in London, live on black rats. The disease kills within a few days, and at its height churches had to lease extra land, as their graveyards were full. These plague burial grounds have been found at Charterhouse Square, Greyfriars, and East Smithfield, where 636 burials were excavated during an excavation in the 1980s. 28 of the monks at Westminster Abbey died, including the abbot. London's population levels took over 150 years to recover. Plague returned in 1361, 1369, 1394, and 1407.

=== Sanitation ===
Many noisome and unsanitary activities were carried on in the city. The streets were unpaved, and so could become muddy and clogged with animal dung. Many Londoners kept pigs, and these often broke free and roamed through the streets. London had strong-smelling industries such as tanneries, soap-makers, tallow chandlers, slaughterhouses, and fishmongers. London had several springs and wells for fresh water, but as the city's population grew, these became insufficient. In 1236, a system of pipes was built to funnel fresh water from the River Tyburn to the Great Conduit in Cheapside, where Londoners could collect their water.

London had its first public toilet from early 12th century near Queenhithe. Most toilets in London in this period emptied into cesspits, which were supposed to be emptied regularly, but there was a toilet in the Palace of Westminster connected to a sewer from 1307. Cesspits and sewers often leaked into rivers, either by design or by accident. For example, in 1355, the River Fleet was found to have three sewers and eleven public privies emptying into it. In the 15th century, a gigantic public toilet with over a hundred seats was constructed in Dowgate and was known as "Whittington's Longhouse" after Richard Whittington, who funded its establishment in his will.

There were several efforts to clean up London's roads from waste and noisome activities during this period. For example, in 1309, leaving human or animal excrement on the road was made punishable by a heavy fine; from 1357 throwing rubbish in the Thames was prohibited; and from 1371 the slaughter of animals was banned within the city walls.

=== Medical practitioners ===
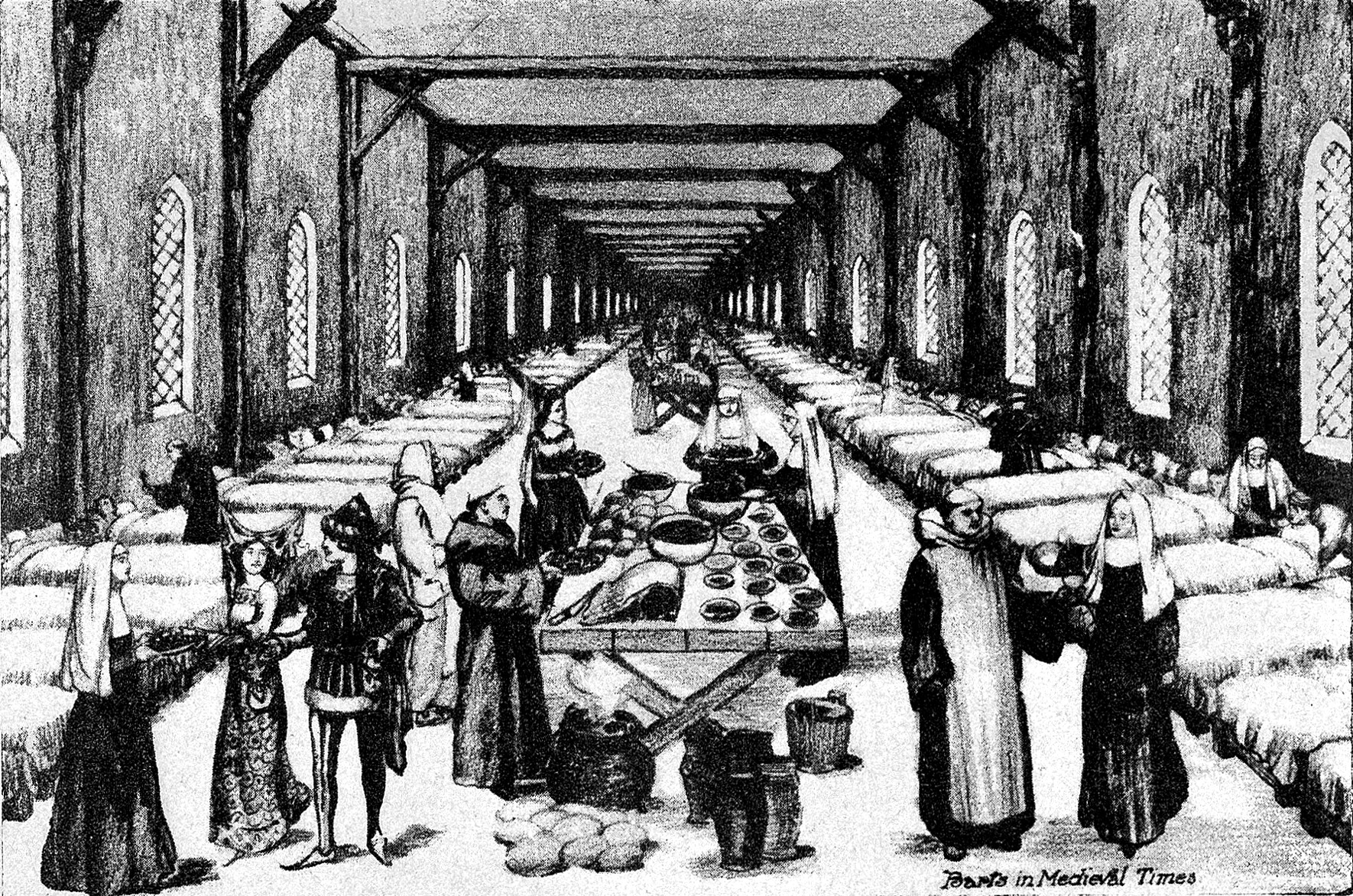
A modern depiction of the interior of St. Bartholomew's Hospital in the medieval period

Hospitals in this period were run by monastic establishments, and were more focussed on being a place of hospitality than strictly of medicine. St. Thomas' Hospital was founded in 1106, and St. Bartholomew's Hospital was founded in 1123, both run by Augustinian canons. A leper hospital was established at St. Giles in the Fields c.1117. From 1163, the clergy were forbidden from practices which might draw blood, such as surgery, and so operations such as tooth-pulling, blood-letting, and amputations became the sphere of barbers instead. In 1247, the priory of St. Mary Bethlehem was founded on the site of the modern-day Liverpool Street station. From 1403 it began to specialise in treating mental illness, becoming the notorious insane asylum, Bedlam, but London's first mental hospital was at All Hallows Barking, established in 1370 for those suffering "the phrenzie". In 1448, a hospital specialising in treatment for leprosy was opened on the site of the modern-day St. James' Palace.

== Crime and law enforcement ==
At the beginning of the period, the king's law courts followed him as he travelled the country. But from 1225, it was decided that they should remain permanently in Westminster, where the High Court of Justice is still based to this day. Although there was no police force in this period, some Londoners served as serjeants guarding the city gates, and night watchmen patrolling the streets after dark. From at least 1282, the church at St. Martin's le Grand rang a curfew bell, upon which all the gates in the city walls and all pubs closed.

If a person was on the run from the law, one avenue open to them was to claim sanctuary in a church. For 40 days, they were allowed to stay within the church without being arrested or forced out. The coroner would be summoned, and the fugitive would turn over all their possessions to the state and swear to abjure the realm in return for their personal safety. Church officials would bring them food during their sanctuary period, and city officials would often post watchmen to make sure they didn't sneak out. The church most famous for providing sanctuary was that of St. Martin-le-Grand.

It was during this period that the Inns of Court were formed, to which all English and Welsh barristers must belong. Lincoln's Inn was let out to legal apprentices by the landowner, Thomas of Lincoln, from 1331, and lawyers were occupying what is now Middle Temple and Inner Temple from 1337, and Gray's Inn from some point in the 15th century. There were also other legal inns which no longer exist today, such as Serjeant's Inn, Clifford's Inn, Clement's Inn, Barnard's Inn and Furnival's Inn.

=== Anti-Jewish violence ===
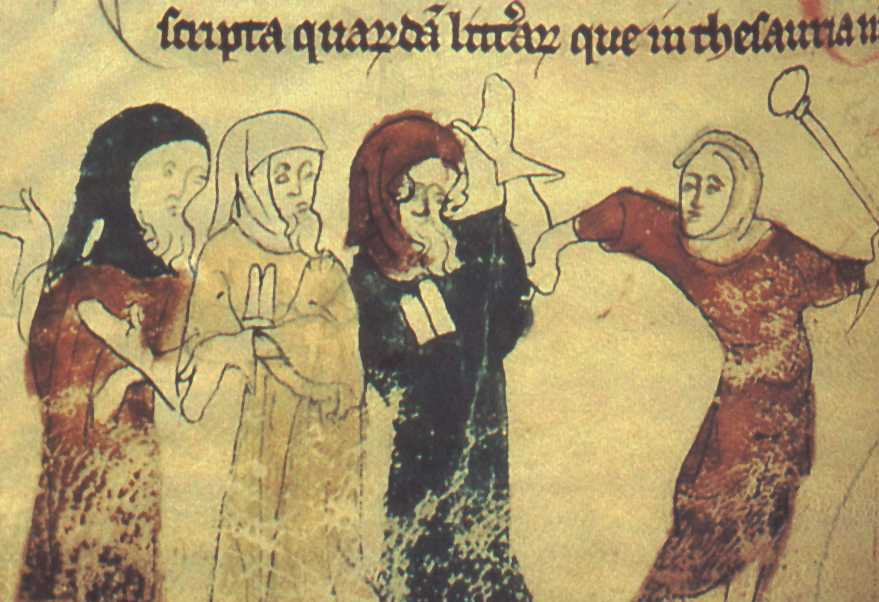
A 14th-century depiction of the expulsion of Jewish people from England in 1290

Violence against Jews took place in 1190, after it was rumoured that Richard I had ordered their massacre after they had presented themselves at his coronation. Anti-Jewish violence became particularly serious in the reign of Henry III, who was unpopular in London and to whom some Jewish financiers lent money. For example, in 1262, after a Jewish man wounded a Christian man in a fight, Londoners stabbed him and attacked many houses in the Jewish district. In 1264 during the Second Barons' War, Simon de Montfort's rebels occupied London and killed 500 Jews while attempting to seize records of debts. Edward I banned Jewish people from moneylending in 1275, leaving many unable to make a living, as they were also not allowed to join the city's trade guilds. Instead, he encouraged merchants from Lombardy in Italy to migrate to London to work as moneylenders. Three years later, 600 were imprisoned in the Tower for coin clipping, of which 293 were hanged. In 1285, London's synagogue was closed, and London's Jewish community was forced to leave England by the Edict of Expulsion in 1290. An estimated 15,000 left for France, Holland and further afield; their property was seized, and many suffered robbery and murder as they departed.

=== Punishments ===
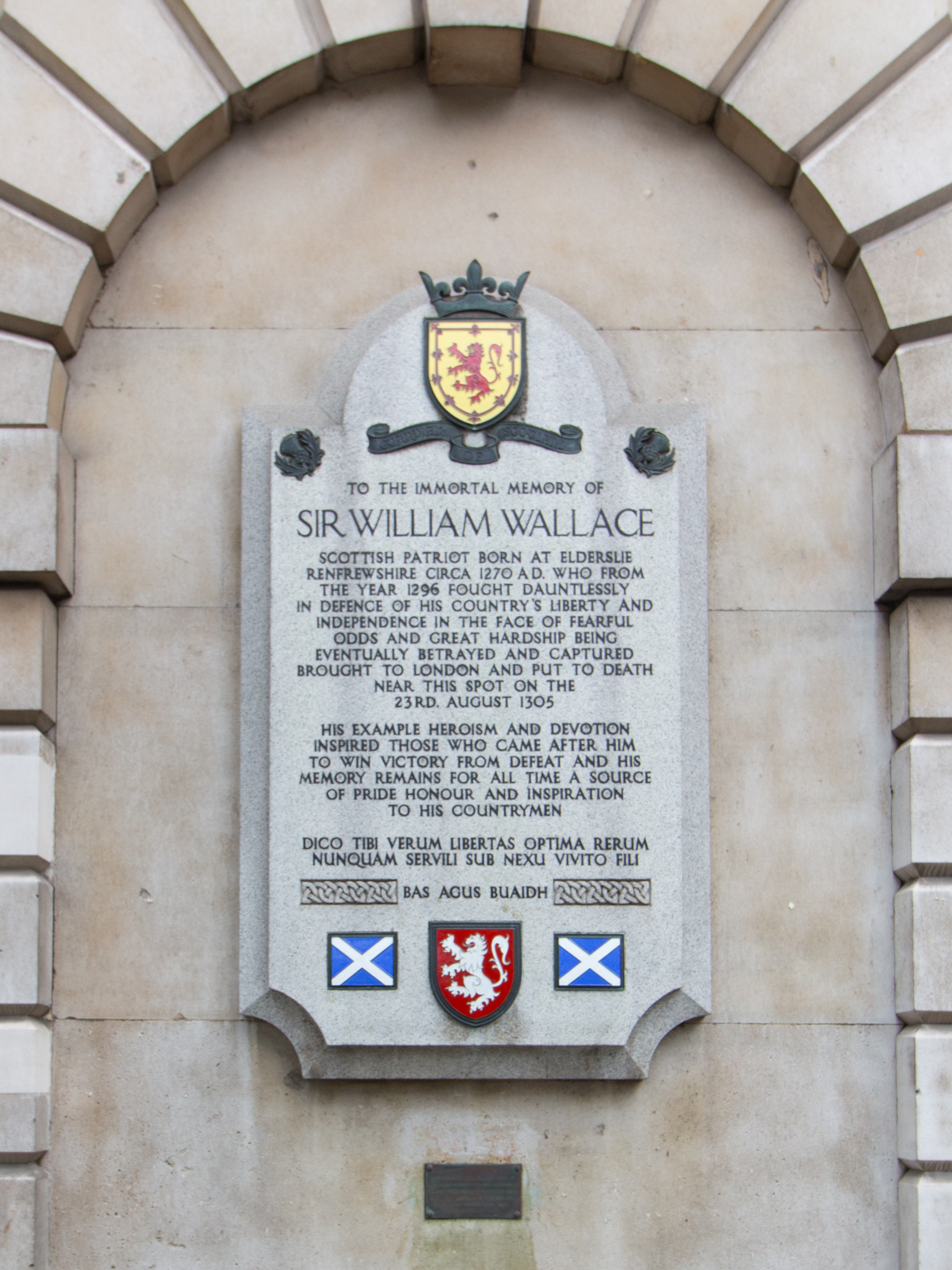
Memorial to William Wallace, close to the site of his execution in Smithfield

The most commonly used execution ground was Tyburn, where executions took place almost every day from 1388 onwards, including the executions of famous traitors such as Roger Mortimer. Smithfield was used as a place for hanging, drawing and quartering, as in the case of the Scottish leader William Wallace. Tower Hill, Newgate, and Cheapside were also used as execution grounds. Burning at the stake was an execution method used for heretics such as John Bradley, a Lollard who was burned at Smithfield in 1410. According to one story, the future Henry V was present, and was so horrified by the screams that he ordered the fire to be doused He offered Bradley a pension and a pardon, but Bradley rejected these and was burned a short while later.

London had several gaols for the imprisonment of those suspected of crimes. The Tower of London was used as a prison from 1100, with its first prisoner, Ranulf Flambard, also becoming the first escapee in 1101. The Fleet Prison and Newgate Prison were founded some time in the 12th century, and the Cornhill Tun prison was built in 1283.

Those convicted of smaller crimes might be placed in the stocks. Stocks could be erected anywhere in London, but there was a set of permanent stocks on the site of Mansion House. The pillory was also used for petty criminals, such as the West Ham butcher William Sperling, who was put in the pillory for selling "putrid and poisonous" beef in 1319. Those found guilty of prostitution might be made to do a walk of penance through London, holding a candle and dressed in their nightgown or a white sheet. This happened to Eleanor, Duchess of Gloucester, who walked through London three times in 1441 as punishment for seeking out the services of a witch to ascertain the date of the king's death. Edward IV's mistress, Jane Shore, was also sentenced to do a penance walk after Edward died and his brother, Richard III, took the throne. The City strictly controlled the weight of a standard halfpenny loaf, and any baker found to be selling underweight bread might be dragged through the streets on a hurdle behind horses, with his bad loaves tied around his neck.

== Religion ==
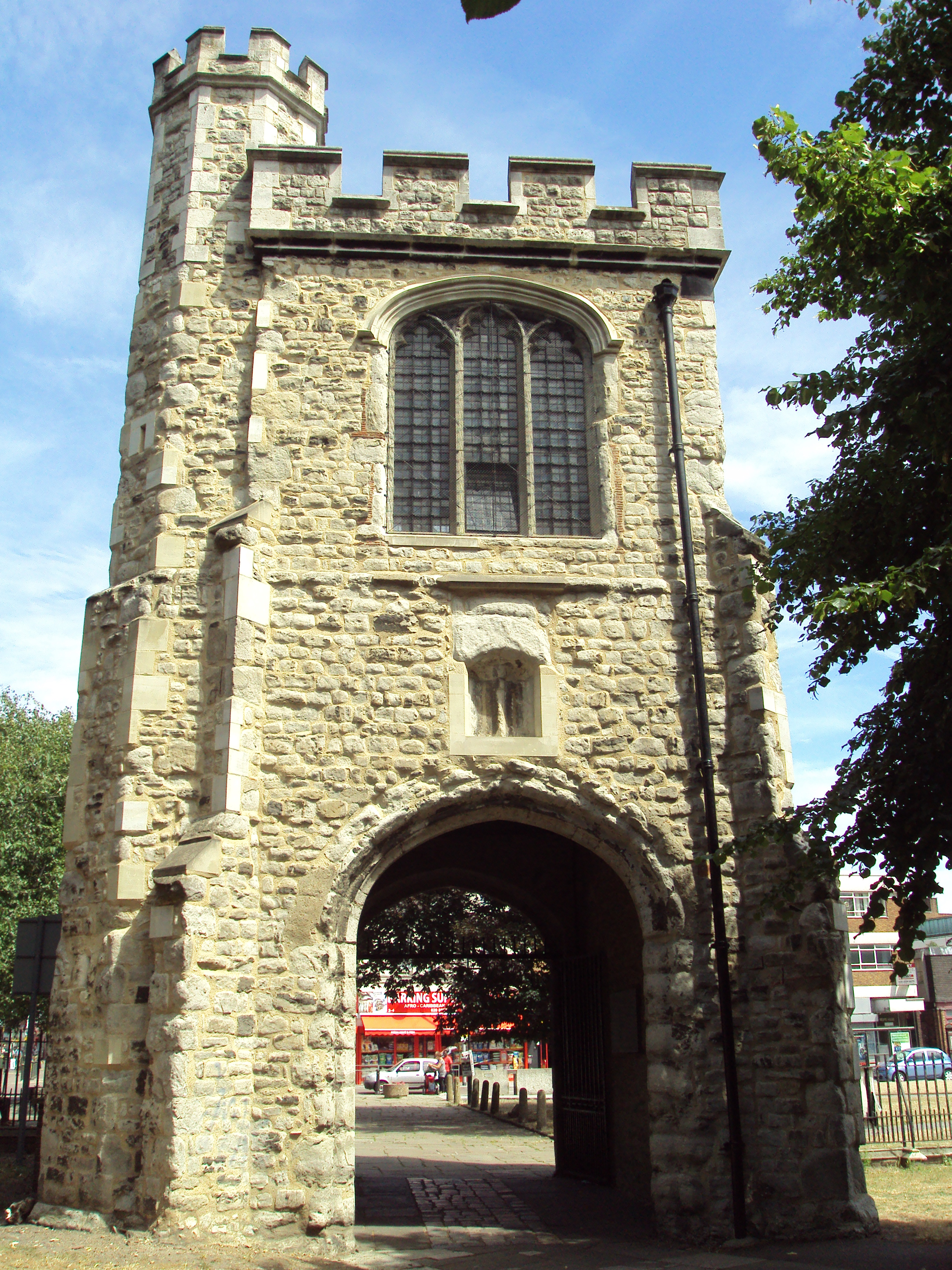
The Curfew Tower, the only part of Barking Abbey that still remains standing

London was home to several important monastic establishments in this period. Barking Abbey was visited by William I shortly after his coronation, and was one of the richest nunneries in England. Bermondsey Abbey was founded in 1082 by a Londoner called Aylwin Child and became England's main centre for Cluniac monks. Merton Priory was founded in 1114 and its students included the archbishop Thomas Becket. In 1118, the Knights Templar had their London headquarters built, including Temple Church. Stratford Langthorne Abbey was founded in 1135, and owned much of what is now East Ham and West Ham. Around 1140, a priory was founded for the Knights of the Order of St. John, known as Clerkenwell Priory. The priory of Greyfriars was established by four Franciscan friars who arrived in London in 1225, and Blackfriars was built for Dominican friars in 1278. In 1308, Edward II had the Knights Templar at Temple Church arrested for heresy, following the example of the French king two years earlier, and their property was given to his favourite, Hugh Despenser the Younger. Carthusian monks were based at London Charterhouse from 1371, and at West Sheen monastery in Richmond from 1414. England's only Bridgettine house, Syon Abbey, was founded at Twickenham in 1415, and moved to Isleworth in 1431.

Churches built or first mentioned in this period include St. Mary-le-Bow (1070–1090), St. Alphege's, Greenwich (1085), St. Mary's, Harrow (1094), St. Stephen's Walbrook (1096), St. Mary Aldemary (1098), St. Mary Abbots (1102), St. Benet's, Paul's Wharf (1111), Temple Church (1118), St. Bartholomew-the-Great (1123), St. Sepulchre-without-Newgate (1137), St. Mary Woolnoth (1191), St. Mary Spital (1197), St. Helen's Bishopsgate (1210), St. Botolph-without-Bishopsgate (1212), St. Martin's Ruislip (1250), St. Ethelburga's Bishopsgate (1278), St. Katharine Cree (c.1280), St. Mary, Whitechapel (1280), St. Etheldreda's (1297), Bow Church (1311), and St. Edward the Confessor, Romford (1406).

In 1349, London was visited by 120 Flagellants, who held a service outside St. Paul's Cathedral performing repentance by being whipped. In 1377, the theologian John Wycliffe was questioned by the Bishop of London at St. Paul's Cathedral for his criticism of the church's large land ownership and meddling in secular politics. He was released, but his followers, called Lollards, continued to face persecution throughout the rest of the period. One of the first Lollards to be executed for heresy was William Chatris, who was the priest at St. Benet Sherehog and who was burned at the stake at Smithfield in 1401. In 1414, Lollards attempted a revolt, gathering at St. Giles, but London did not open its gates for them, and 60 ringleaders were hanged at Newgate Prison.

The patron saint of London is Thomas Becket, an archbishop and Londoner who was murdered in his own cathedral in 1170. After his death, a cult quickly grew up around him across the country, particularly in London. In 1173 he was made a saint, and sites connected to him in London became places of pilgrimage, such as his family home on Cheapside, his parents' tomb in St. Paul's Cathedral, and the newly built chapel on London Bridge.

== Culture and entertainment ==
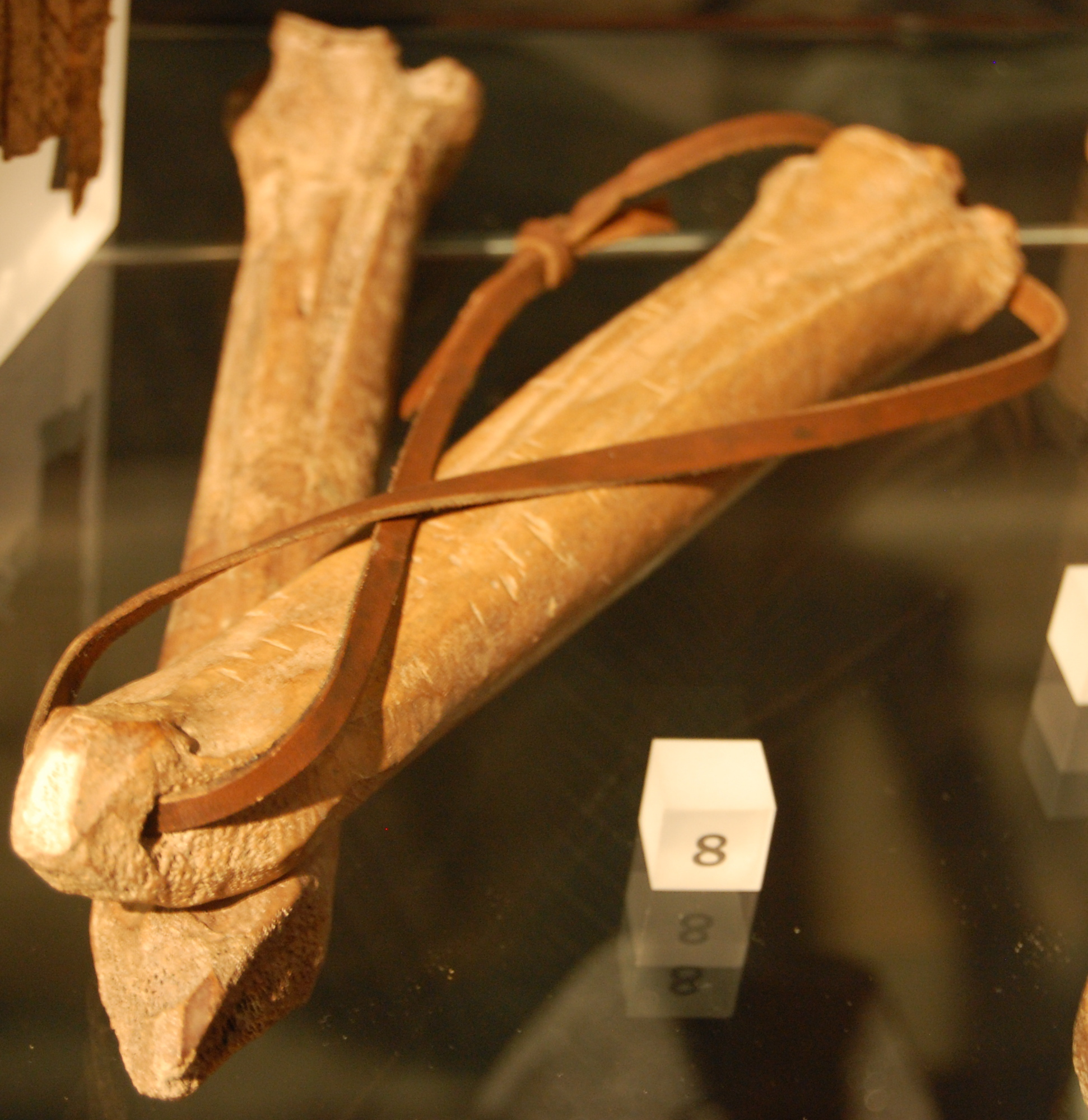
Ice skates from medieval London made from cattle bones, on display in the Museum of London

London's largest regular festival was Bartholomew Fair, taking place at Smithfield every year and hosting jousts and tournaments. Smithfield also held a regular horse fair on Fridays where spectators could see prize horses being demonstrated and raced. Another important fair was Westminster Fair, which took place in January and October every year. From 1248, no other fairs or London shops were allowed to trade during the weeks of Westminster Fair. London had conduits for people to access piped water, and for celebrations these conduits could be made to run with wine, such as to celebrate the coronation of Henry IV in 1399. In 1174, the writer William Fitzstephen described Londoners ice-skating on the marsh at Moorfields when it froze over: "Men go to sport upon the Ice: then fetching a Run, and setting their feet at a distance, and placing their Bodies sideways, they slide a great Way". Occasionally, winters would be cold enough for the Thames itself to freeze over, such as in 1410, when for 14 weeks Londoners could cross the Thames on foot.

Jousts and tournaments were popular entertainments for Londoners. For example, a royal joust was held on Cheapside in 1331.

Prostitution was mostly forbidden within the city walls, but Southwark was known for its brothels. The Bishop of Winchester owned most of the land in this area, and so acted as the landlord for these establishments.

The writer Geoffrey Chaucer was born in London, probably in his parents' house on Upper Thames Street, in 1340, and wrote works such as The Canterbury Tales and Troilus and Criseyde. Throughout his career, he had a long friendship with fellow poet John Gower, who wrote works such as Vox Clamantis, Confessio Amantis, and Mirour de l'Omne. In 1476, the printing press was brought to London by a businessman called William Caxton, who set up near Westminster Abbey. Rather than compete with better-established German presses, Caxton printed many texts in English, including his own translations of religious and secular works.

There were no purpose-built theatres in London in this period, but mystery plays and passion plays based on Biblical stories were performed. For example, in 1409, the Worshipful Company of Parish Clerks put on a play called The Creation of the World written by the Lord Mayor of London, which lasted eight days. Mystery plays were put on regularly at Clerkenwell. Mummings were regularly held to celebrate religious festivals, such as the 1377 mumming at Kennington which took place for Prince Richard in which 130 Londoners dressed as nobles and high-ranking churchmen.

== Trade and commerce ==
Almost all England's most wealthy merchants lived in London, with 14% of London merchants in the 14th century having a wealth of over £1000- on par with a wealthy knight. The price of goods in London was similarly higher than elsewhere in the country. One commentator in 1337 found the price of groceries about 50% higher in London than in other parts of England. From 1279, one of the royal mints operated out of the Tower of London.

London's general markets were at Cheapside, Newgate, Cornhill and Leadenhall. There were meat markets at Eastcheap and the Stocks, grain markets at Queenhithe and Gracechurch Street, and fish markets at Bridge Street and Old Fish Street. From the beginning of the period, London's two main docks were Queenhithe and Billingsgate. The construction of London Bridge in 1209 blocked many boats from accessing Queenhithe, and so Billingsgate became the more important of the two. The Hanseatic League operated in London, trading with other ports on the Continent. Cologne merchants were granted free rent on a hall on the site of the modern Cannon Street station in 1194, which eventually became their base, known as the Steelyard. The Steelyard became London's largest dock controlled by a single group of traders.

London's craftspeople were organised by profession into guilds or "livery companies", named after the uniforms or "liveries" worn by their officials on important occasions. The oldest of these, the Weavers' Company, was granted its royal charter in 1155- the oldest-known royal charter to any craft organisation. Members' dues went towards helping those who'd suffered theft, fire, or disability. Guilds also regulated their trades, making sure that standards were kept consistent across the profession, and punishing those who brought the trade into disrepute by selling poor-quality goods. For example, the Grocers' Company were in charge of preventing spices and medicines from being sold adulterated. If a person wanted to practice a trade in London, they had to belong to the relevant guild, meaning that competition from outsiders could easily be stifled. The guilds also excluded Jewish people from joining, leaving few professions open to them. From 1376, the guilds were powerful enough that members of the Common Council began to be nominated by guilds instead of by London's wards. During the 15th century, the guilds began to develop an order of precedence among themselves, roughly based on seniority, with older guilds ranking higher in the order. However, the Merchant Taylors and Skinners could not agree on which of them should rank sixth and which should rank seventh, until 1483, when the mayor ordered that they should alternate each year, a practice still carried out today. Each of these guilds had a hall for meetings and dinners, but almost all the medieval halls have now been destroyed and rebuilt in later periods, and the only piece remaining is the undercroft of Merchant Taylors' Hall, which dates from the mid-14th century.
