= John Bowles =

John Bowles may refer to:

- Jack Bowles (1890–1971), English cricketer
- John Bowles (author) (1751–1819), English barrister and author
- John Bowles (darts player) (born 1967), English darts player
- John Bowles (priest) (died 1558), Canon of Windsor
- John Bowles (MP for New Shoreham), English politician of the 16th century
- John Bowles (a.k.a. Johnny Bowles) (born 1965), Australian entertainer and member of Young Talent Time (1977–81)

== See also ==
- John Bowle (disambiguation)
