= John Bowle =

John Bowle may refer to:

- John Bowle (historian) (1905–1985), English historian and writer
- John Bowle (writer) (1725–1788), English clergyman and scholar; the first Hispanist
- John Bowle (bishop) (died 1637), English churchman and bishop of Rochester

== See also ==
- John Bowles (disambiguation)
