= Merton Priory =

Former priory in Merton, Surrey, England

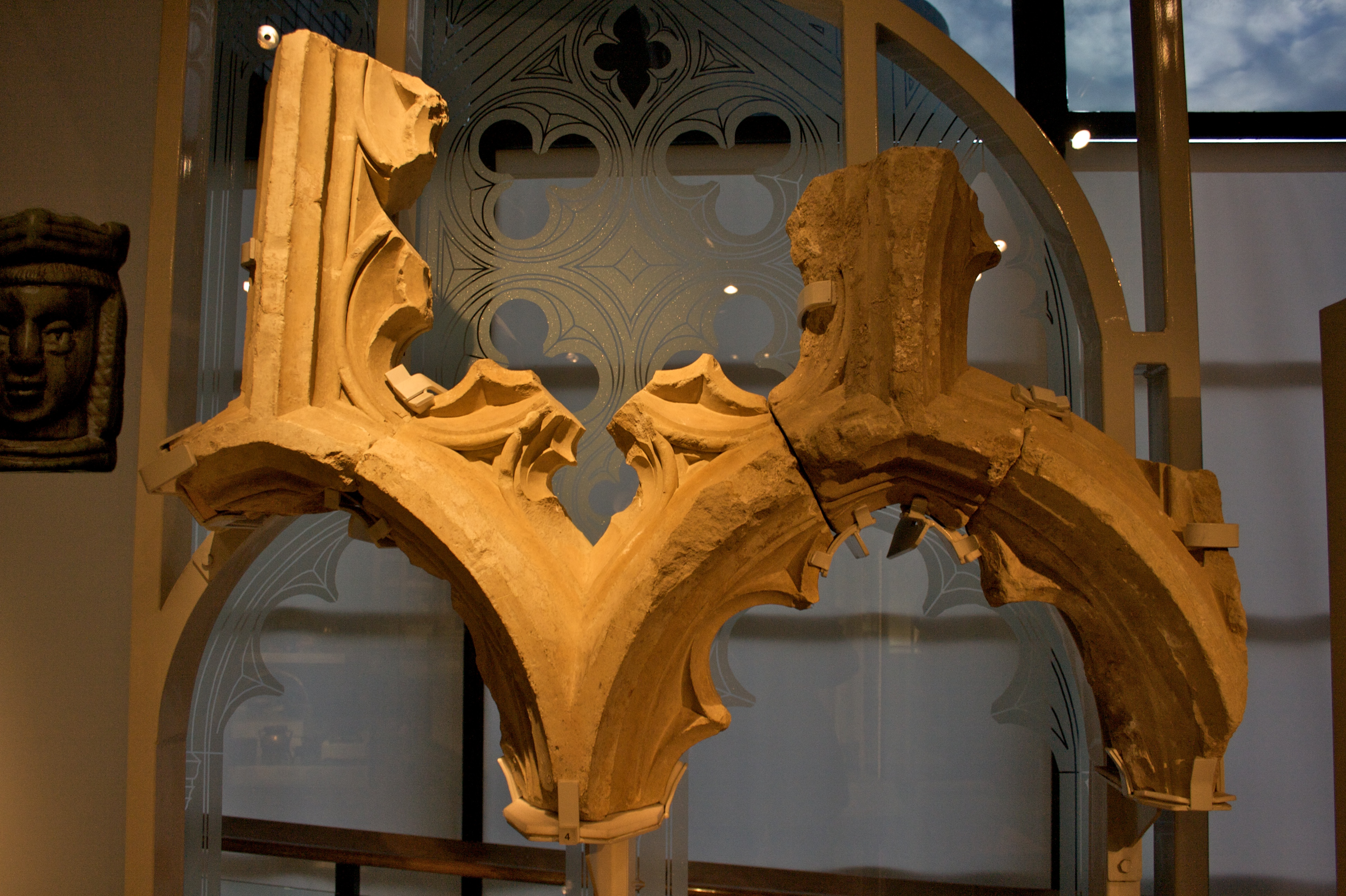
- Window tracery from Merton Priory, on display in the Museum of London (February 2010)

- Location within Greater London

Monastery information
- Established: 1114
- Disestablished: 1538

People
- Founders: Gilbert Norman, Sheriff of Surrey
- Important associated figures: Adrian IV; Thomas Becket; Walter de Merton

Site
- Location: Merton, Surrey, England
- Coordinates: 51°24′52.26″N 0°10′52.58″W

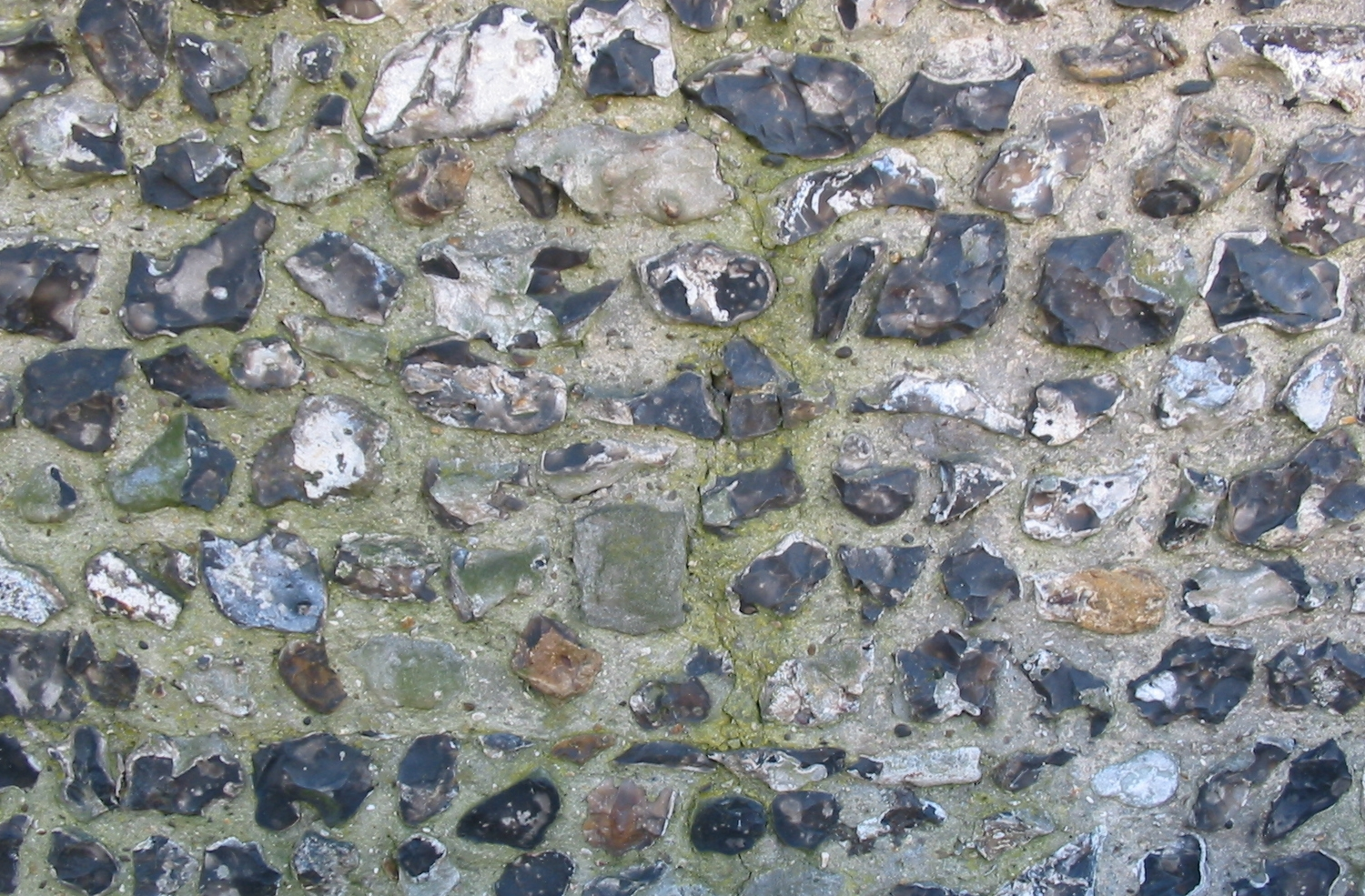
Remains of a knapped flint wall, a rare survival from Merton Priory

Merton Priory was an English Augustinian priory founded in 1114 by Gilbert Norman, Sheriff of Surrey under King Henry I (1100–1135). It was situated within the manor of Merton in the county of Surrey, in what is today the Colliers Wood area in the London Borough of Merton.

== Buildings and holdings ==
The priory buildings were situated within the Diocese of Winchester (now in the Diocese of Southwark) and at the point where the River Wandle was crossed by Stane Street (the Roman road to Chichester), about 10 kilometres (6.2 mi) outside the City of London. It held cultivated land and pastures there and at other places in Surrey and held manors and other lands elsewhere, as well as the patronage of churches, in England. Merton canons are the canons in Canons' Teign, Devon.

== History ==
By 1117 the foundation had been colonised by Canons Regular from the Augustinian priory at Huntingdon and re-sited in Merton, close to the Wandle.

The priory became an important centre of learning and diplomacy. Thomas Becket briefly studied there around 1130, and later was wont to wear the habit of a Merton canon – as was a successor of his, Hubert Walter. It is thought that Walter de Merton studied there in the 1230s; he established a house for Merton scholars in Old Malden, and this eventually was moved to Oxford, becoming Merton College. Edmund of Abingdon wrote some of his Oxford lectures in the peace of the Priory. In 1205, King John sent a canon of Merton as an ambassador to Normandy; Prince Louis of France did penance there after a series of peace conferences culminating in the Treaty of Lambeth in 1217.

In 1236 King Henry III held a Parliament at the Priory at which the Statute of Merton was passed allowing, amongst other matters, lords of the manor to enclose common land provided that sufficient pasture remained for their tenants. This was the first recorded statute of the first recorded English parliament.

On 1 November 1437, shortly before his 16th birthday, Henry VI had a crowning ceremony at Merton Priory, although the exact nature of this is unclear.

== Destruction ==
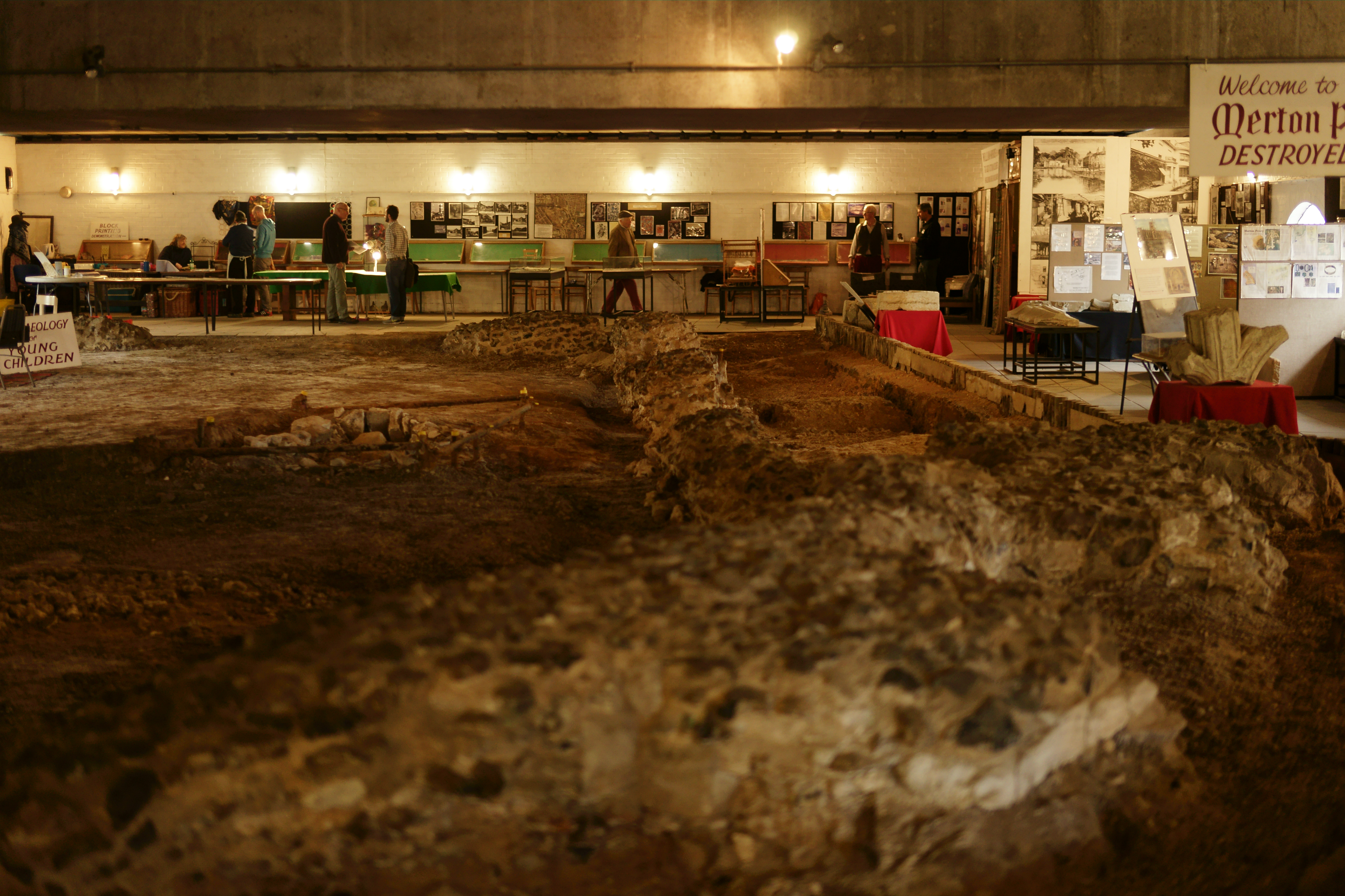
The ruins of the chapter house

The Priory was demolished in 1538, following King Henry VIII's Dissolution of the Monasteries, having been valued in the Valor Ecclesiasticus of 1535 at a relatively high sum of £960 16 shillings 6 pence. John Bowles alias John Ramsey surrendered the monastery of 14 canons on 16 April 1538. Much of the masonry was reused at the king's Nonsuch Palace. The site of the Priory is now occupied by Sainsbury's supermarket (Merton branch). Remains of the Chapter House are now a museum under Merantun Way, between Sainsbury's and Merton Abbey Mills.

== Priors ==
Robert Bayle (c. 1115–50)
Robert (de Tew?) (1150–67)
William 1167–77)
Stephen, 1177–8)
Robert (1178–1186)
Richard (1190–8)
Walter (1198–1218)
Thomas de Wllst (1218–22)
Giles de Bourne (1222–1231)
Henry de Basing (1231–8)
Robert de Hegham (1238–49)
Eustachius (1249–52)
Gilbert de Asshe (1252–92)
Nicholas Tregony (1292–6)
Edmund de Herierd (1296–1305)
Geoffrey de Alkemondbury (1305–7)
William de Brokesburn (1307–1334)
Thomas de Kent (1334)
John de Lytlynton (1339–1345)
William de Friston (1345–61)
Geoffrey de Chaddesley (1361–8)
Robert de Wyndesore (1368–1403)
Michael Kympton (1403–13)
John Romeney (1413–32)
Thomas Shirfeld (1432–1439)
William Kent (1439–1442)
John Kingston (1442–1485)
John Gisbourne (1485–1502)
William Sayling (1502–20)
John Lacy (1520–30)
John Ramsey (1530–8)
