= John Bowles (priest) =

English priest (died 1558)

John Bowles (or Bockle, alias John Ramsey) (d. 15 August 1558) was a Canon of Windsor from 1557 to 1558.

== Career ==
He was a fellow of All Souls College, Oxford.

He was appointed:

- Prior of Merton Priory Surrey (the last)

He was appointed to the first stall in St George's Chapel, Windsor Castle in 1557, and held the stall until 1558.
