= Thomas Fitzthomas =

C13 Mayor of London

Mayor of London
- In office October 1261 – September 1265
- Preceded by: William Fitzrichard
- Succeeded by: Hugh Fitzotho

Personal details
- Born: Unknown
- Died: c. 1276
- Party: Baronial
- Profession: Politician

Thomas Fitzthomas (died c. 1276) was Mayor of London in the 13th century, closely associated with Simon De Montfort and the revolutionary regime at the time of the Second Barons' War. He led a popular uprising against the established authorities of London, and was imprisoned by Henry III when he resumed power in 1265.

== Background ==
Fitzthomas was born into the ruling elite of thirteenth century London, and was a member of the Drapers' Guild. At that time the city, with a population of around 100,000 was governed by a council of 24 aldermen. The details of his precise biography are not known, but he became an alderman in the 1240s, and served as Sheriff 1257-8. He was appointed Mayor of London in 1261 (the title of the office later was changed to Lord Mayor in the 14th century). He lived in a mansion at Cornhill.

== Revolutionary role ==
In 1263, when De Monfort's forces advanced on London, Fitzthomas led a popular uprising in support of the Barons. He governed through a renewal of the traditional folkmoot form of government, bypassing the elite of aldermen. He publicly endorsed the Provisions of Oxford, the constitutional changes being demanded by the baronial party.

== Aftermath and death ==
Following the defeat of De Montfort and the barons at Evesham in 1265, Fitzthomas was imprisoned by the then Prince Edward. Even then he remained popular, and there were demands in 1266 for his restoration to the mayoralty. He was released in 1268 and paid a substantial fine of £500. He died around 1276, survived by two sons.
