= Barnard's Inn =

Former legal building in London, England

Coordinates: 51.5177°N 0.1098°W

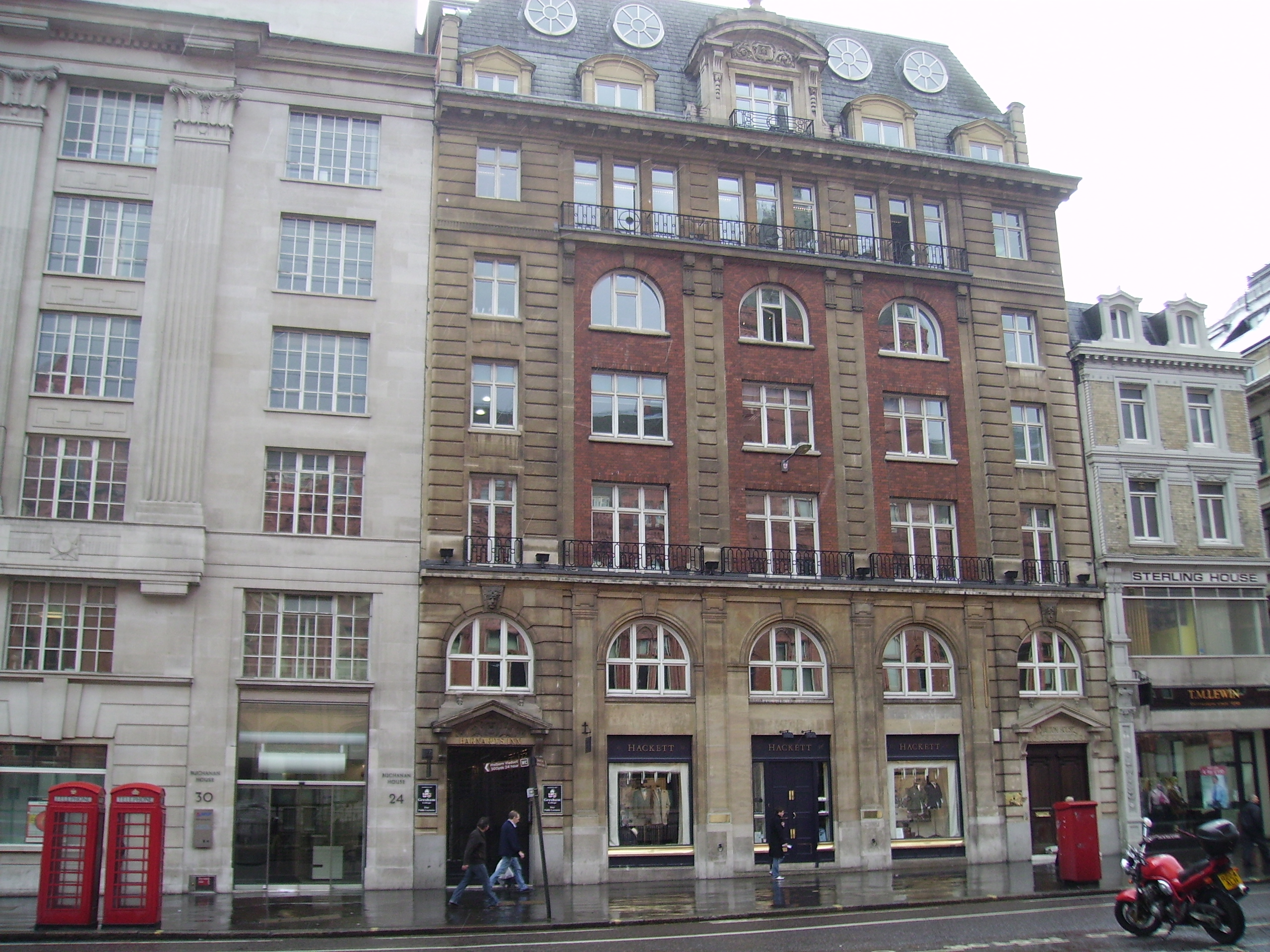
Frontage of Barnard's Inn Buildings. The remains of the Inn lie down the entrance at the right

Barnard's Inn is a former Inn of Chancery in Holborn, London. It is now the home of Gresham College, an institution of higher learning established in 1597 that hosts public lectures.

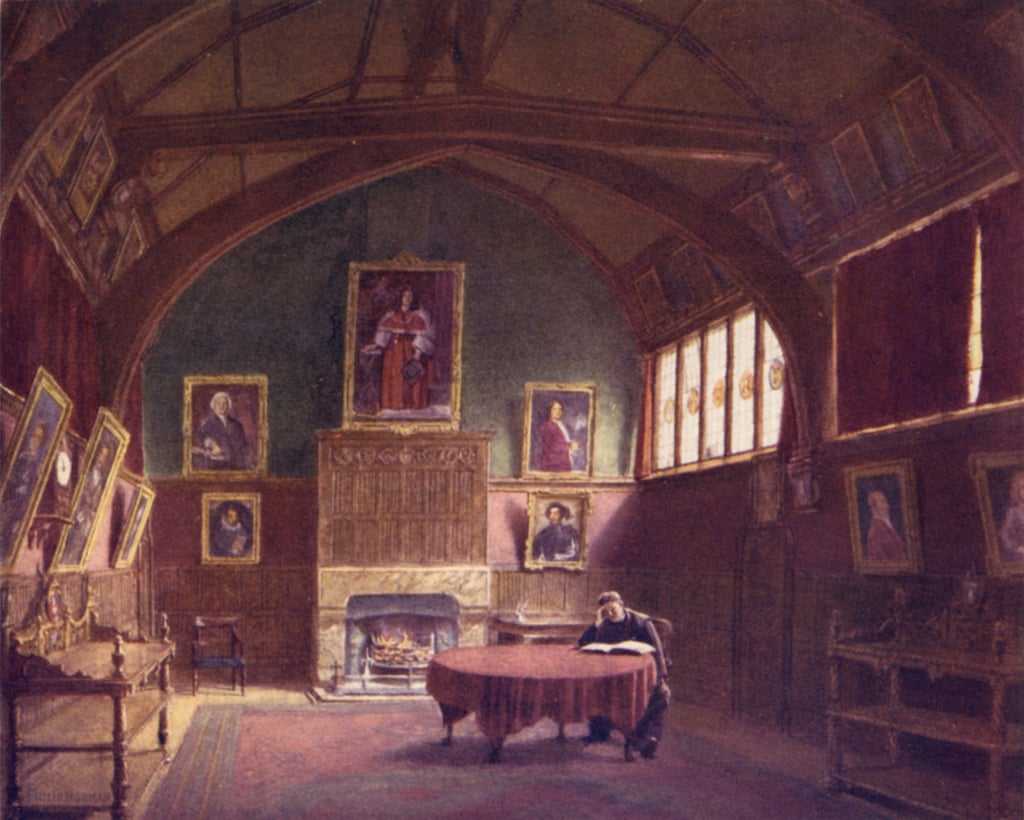
Hall of Barnards Inn, Holborn, 1886 by Philip Norman

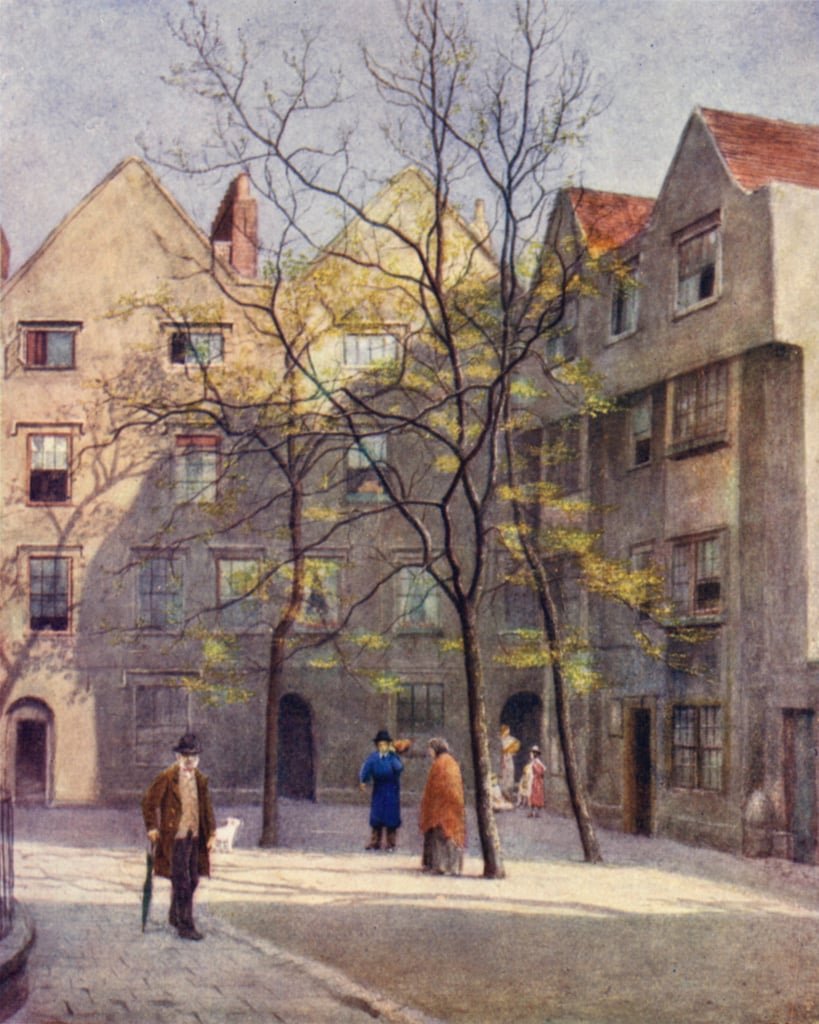
Part of Barnards Inn, Holborn, 1886 by Philip Norman

Over the centuries, it has served as a school for law students, a venue for qualified attorneys, and residential chambers. The Inn suffered damage during the Gordon Riots in 1780, but was compensated. It was purchased by the Mercers' Company in the late 19th century and served as the Mercers' School premises until 1959. The buildings include a hall with 18th-century chambers and reception rooms, featuring notable architectural elements like 15th-century wooden bays, 16th-century linen fold wood panelling, and the only surviving crown posts in Greater London. Since 1991, the Inn has been home to Gresham College, hosting public lectures.

== History ==
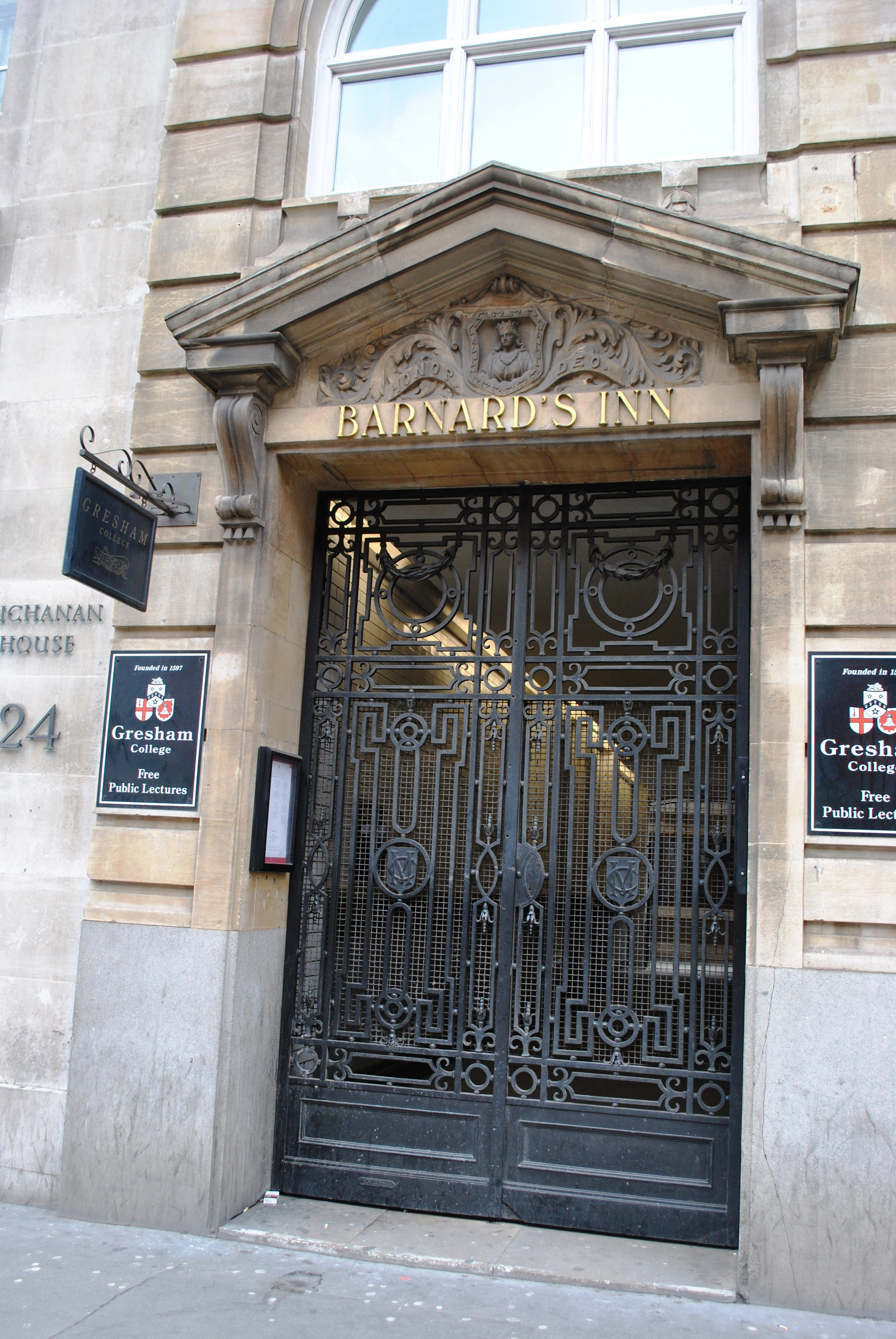
Barnard's Inn entrance

Barnard's Inn dates back at least to the mid-thirteenth century – it was recorded as part of the estate of Sir Adam de Basing (Adam de Baysing), one time Lord Mayor of London. It passed on to John Mackworth, the Dean of Lincoln, who in turn passed it on to the Dean and Chapter of Lincoln on his death in 1451. Three years later, it was established as an Inn of Chancery – these were schools for law students before they passed on to an Inn of Court. Barnard's Inn was one of two Inns of Chancery linked to Gray's Inn, the other being Staple Inn. Members of Gray's Inn were appointed readers to the Barnard or Staple Inn. For example, in the meeting of the Pension of Gray's Inn, 19 November 1617, it was stated: "Mr. William Denny chosen Reader of Barnard's Inn." Members of Barnard or Staple's Inn had to pay four pounds for being admitted to Gray's Inn. Hence, at the meeting of the Pension 15 May 1626 it was said that gentlemen coming from Barnard or Staple's Inn "and crave the benefit of the fine of 43 shillings and 4 pence upon their admittance shall be admitted of the third table and paye but 43 shillings and 4 pence in that respect, otherwise to paye foure poundes as others do notwithstanding they be of Barnards Inne or Staple Inne."

Barnard's Inn was badly damaged during the Gordon Riots in 1780. An adjacent distillery, owned by a Roman Catholic, Mr Langdale (who escaped), was set alight by rioters. The Hall and other buildings were damaged and one of the officers of the Inn witnessed a "sturdy fellow" pumping up gin from the cellar which he proceeded to sell at a penny a mug to the thirsty onlookers of the fire. The Inn received £3,200 in compensation for the damage.

By the 17th century, qualified attorneys were allowed to practise from Inns of Chancery as well as Inns of Court. By 1830, it had effectively become a set of residential chambers. In 1888, the link to the Dean and Chapter of Lincoln was broken and soon it was purchased by the Mercers' Company, serving as premises for the Mercers' School until 1959. It has been used as a venue for lectures by Gresham College since 1991.

== Buildings ==
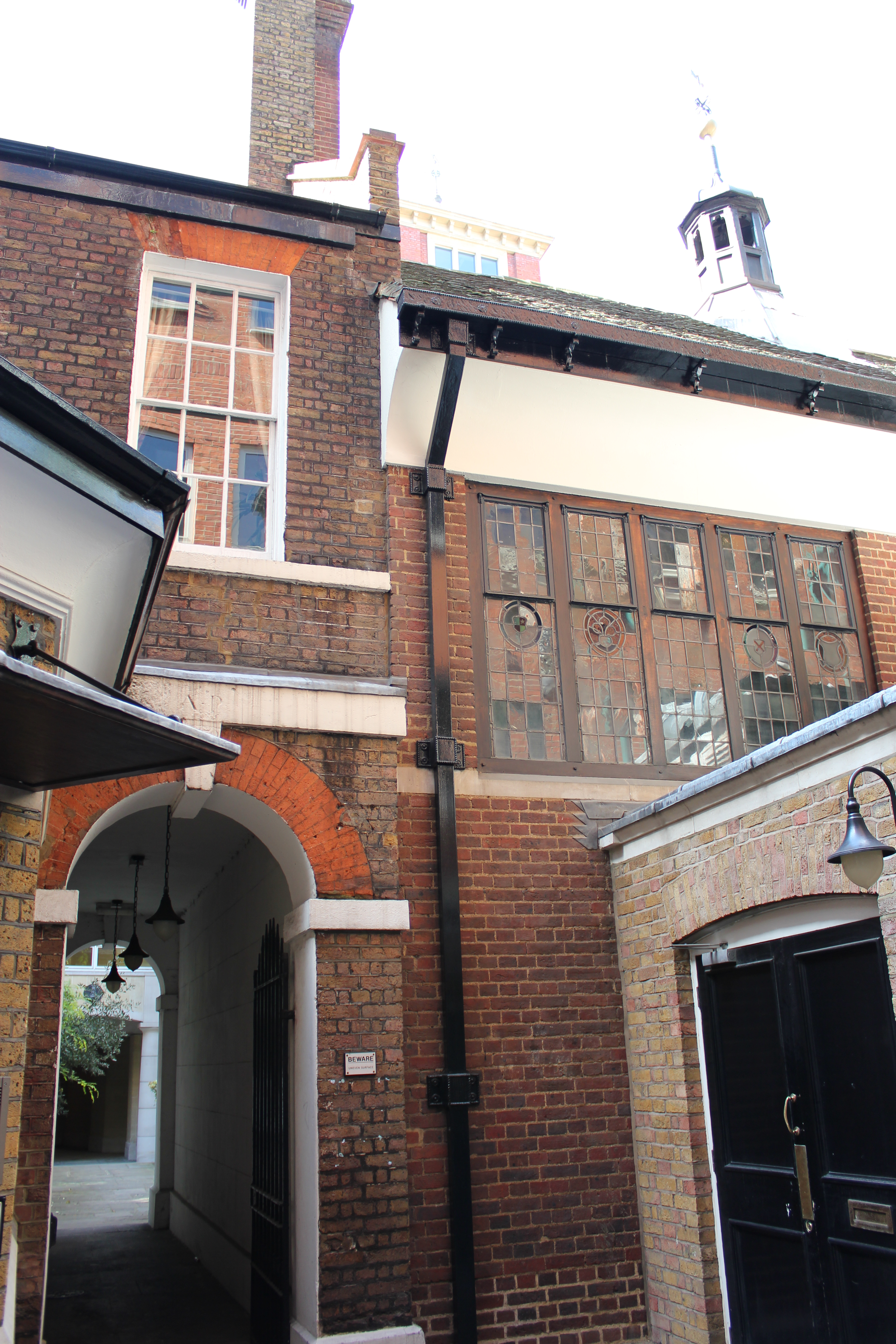
Barnard's Inn Hall, as viewed from outside of the entrance to the Gresham College offices

The buildings consist of a Hall, with 18th-century chambers and reception room. The Hall has three wooden bays, and dates from the 15th Century with 16th-century linen fold wood panelling. The roof timbers include the only surviving crown posts in Greater London. Some chalk-and-tile walling in the seminar room below dates back to Roman London.

The Hall suffered from poor repair and two inadequate restorations in the 19th century. The Mercers' Company organised substantial repairs in 1932. The roof was removed, renovated and replaced and two fireplaces of Tudor design were installed. The windows were reglazed, releaded and reframed. The windows contain the armorial bearings of Principals of Barnard's Inn:

- William Harvey (1545)
- Gilbert Hide (1558)
- Thomas Wilcox (1574)
- George Copuldike (1594)
- John Wicksteed (1594)
- Pieter van de Putte (1666)
- Silvester Petyt (1701)
- William Betts (1704)
- William Manlove (1710)
- Matthew Lancaster (1716)
- Dingley Askham (1722)
- Wiseman Claycett (1728)

The hall was renovated again in 1990, adding facilities for meetings and functions, ready to become the home of Gresham College.

== Literary reference ==
The hero of Charles Dickens's novel Great Expectations, Pip, lodged in Barnard's Inn with Herbert Pocket for a number of years following his arrival in London, which would have been circa 1820.

== See also ==
- List of demolished buildings and structures in London
