= Salomon de Basing =

English politician

- Born: London
- Died: London
- Known for: Sixth Lord Mayor of London
- Predecessor: Jacob Alderman
- Successor: Serlo le Mercer 1217-1222 (earlier Mayor who served again),

Salomon de Basing (fl. 13th century) was an English politician of medieval London. He served alongside Hugh Basing as a Sheriff of London in 1214, and was elected Lord Mayor in 1216 after the deposition of Jacob Alderman on Trinity Sunday. He was succeeded by earlier mayor Serlo le Mercer in 1217.

Adam de Basing, his son or grandson, served as a Sheriff in 1243 before being elected Lord Mayor in 1251. London's Basinghall Street took its name from the Basing/Bassing family, which, Stow writes, was 'of great antiquity and renown' within the realm.
