= Dingley Askham =

English lawyer

Dingley Askham (died 12 July 1728) was an English attorney, latterly Principal of Barnard's Inn in London.

== Biography ==
Askham was a native of St. Ives, Huntingdonshire, and was admitted to Barnard's Inn on 26 June 1694. He served as Principal of the Inn from 16 July 1722 until his death on 12 July 1728. He is commemorated by an armorial window in the Hall of the Inn and by a memorial in All Saints' Church in St. Ives.

== Dingley Askham junior ==
Askham is often confused with his son of the same name, Dingley Askham junior (born c. 1695, also in St. Ives, and died 26 April 1781, aged 86). He was likewise admitted to Barnard's Inn, on 19 June 1725, to undertake legal study. However, in 1729 he eloped with and married the daughter and heiress of Thomas Cotton of Conington, Cambridgeshire, who reportedly died of rage on hearing of the marriage, because of the low social status of his attorney son-in-law. Askham and his wife subsequently lived at the property she inherited, Conington Hall. He was involved in restoring Conington church in 1737. Later in life, he was a justice of the peace and a well-respected huntsman.
