= Roger FitzAlan =

Second Lord Mayor of London

Roger fitz Alan de Londonstane

2nd Lord Mayor of London
- In office September 1212 – May 1214
- Preceded by: Henry Fitz-Ailwin
- Succeeded by: Serlo le Mercer

Personal details
- Born: 1177
- Died: c. 12??
- Relations: Henry fitz Ailwin, possible uncle or Grandfather.

Roger FitzAlan was a thirteenth-century Mayor of London. Having been a Sheriff of London in 1192, he was elected the second Lord Mayor of London in September 1212 on the death of his predecessor.

There has been some speculation that he could have been related to Henry Fitz-Ailwin, Roger was possibly a nephew (son of his brother Alan), or grandson (son of Alan FitzHenry), or some other relation. Roger Fitz Alan was close to Henry Fitz-Alwin, 'Throughout his mayoralty he was regularly accompanied by Roger fitz Alan. Henry Fitz Ailwin was closely associated with Roger FitzAlan who may have been related or a business associate. There are well over 100 existing documents that bear the signature of FitzAilwin as mayor and around 70 of those also include FitzAlan’s signature", given the dates it is most likely that Roger Fitz Alan was his nephew, son of Henry Fitz-Ailwin's brother Alan. r Under Roger Fitz Alan's mayoralty, Alan Fitz Peter, Joce Fitz Peter and Andrew Fitz Peter were among others, appointed as aldermen, and may also have been relatives.

Although Roger Fitz-Alan's term of office was meant only to be one year, he stayed in office until May 1214, when rebel barons against John of England captured London and installed their own candidate against the King.
