= The Mercers' Company =

English livery company

Mercers' Company
- Motto: Honor Deo ("Honour to God")
- Location: Mercers' Hall, 6 Frederick's Place, City of London; 51.51416°N 0.0914°W
- Date of formation: 1394; 632 years ago
- Company association: General merchants
- Order of precedence: 1st
- Master of company: Mrs Lucy Walsh Waring
- Website: www.mercers.co.uk

The Mercers' Company, or the Worshipful Company of Mercers, is a livery company of the City of London in the Great Twelve City Livery Companies, and ranks first in the order of precedence of the Companies. Mercery was from a French term meaning a type of haberdasher but has previously been for a variety of goods and ultimately derived from the Latin for merchant.

Today, the Company exists primarily as a charitable institution, supporting a variety of causes. The company's motto is Honor Deo (Latin, "Honour to God").

== History ==
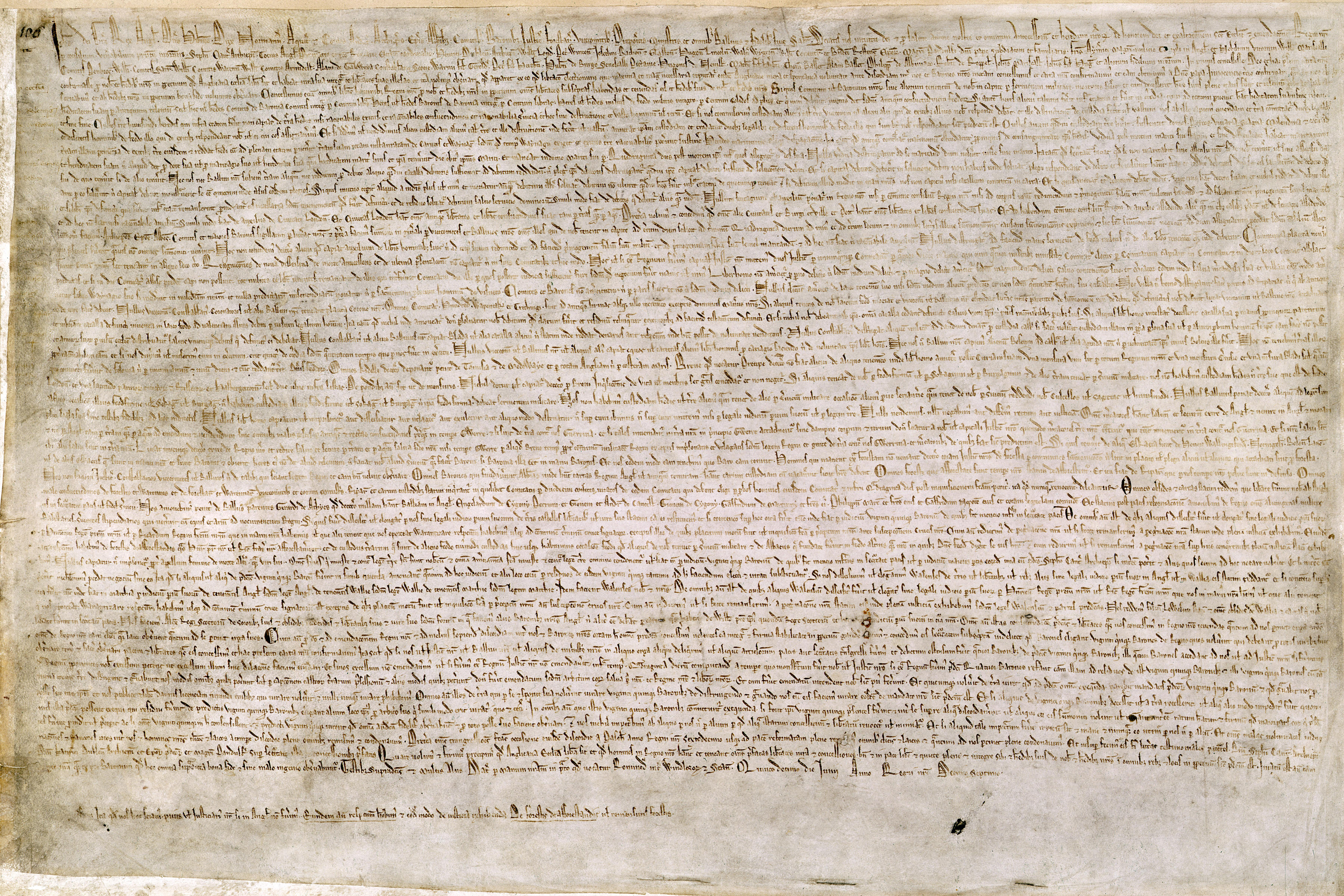
The Magna Carta was negotiated by a member of the Mercers.

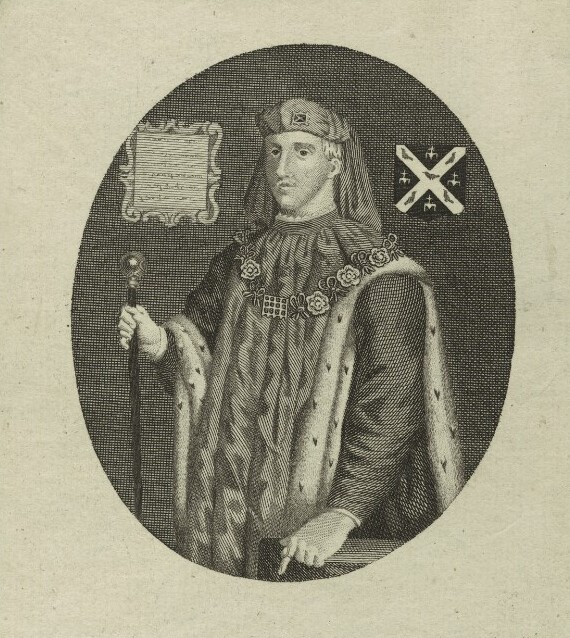
Henry fitz Ailwin, thought a Mercer, was 1st Lord Mayor of London; of mainly English rather than Norman descent, his grandfather Leofstan (c. 1100–1150) was probably the portreeve of London.

The Mercers' Company is based at Mercers' Hall, 6 Frederick's Place in the City of London. The City block upon which it stands contains the archaeology of a Roman-British temple known today as Gresham Temple.

Its corporate existence began in the form of a fraternity at least by the reign of King Henry II, in the mid 1100s if not before.

From 1210 to 1214, the first two Mayors of London, Henry FitzAlwyn and Robert FitzAlwyn were claimed to be members, and a branch of the company was established at this time as the Company of Merchant Adventurers at Antwerp, the centre of the cloth trade.

Serlo le Mercer was a member of the Company and was one of the negotiators of Magna Carta.

Although of even older origin, the Company was incorporated under a Royal Charter in 1394, its earliest extant Charter. The Company's aim was to act as a trade association for general merchants, and especially for exporters of wool and importers of velvet, silk and other luxurious fabrics (mercers).

From the 14th century onwards the Company held its meetings in the Hospital of St. Thomas of Acon on Cheapside.

Around 1438, William Caxton was apprenticed into the Mercers, under Robert Large, becoming a full member in 1452: his work took him into the Low Countries.

Between 1517 and 1524, the Company built the Mercers' Chapel on this land, with the first Mercers' Hall above it, fronting Cheapside.

A member of the Mercers, Robert Packington, was murdered on 13 November 1536, the first recorded death by shooting with a handgun. Rose Hickman, a Protestant, recalled how he used to bring English bibles from beyond sea and it is thought this may be connected to the murder. The entrance appears to have been on to Ironmonger Lane, and an interconnecting mansion house was secured by Sir Rowland Hill in 1546, which he later put at the use of his protégé and heir (via his niece) Sir Thomas Leigh. Hill is associated with the publication of the Geneva Bible, and is considered a possible inspiration for the character Old Sir Rowland in Shakespeare's As You Like It.

There are accounts of the Mercers' buildings being the focus of London civic pageantry in the mid-16th century. For instance Sir Rowland Hill and Sir Thomas Gresham together with Henry VIII and Jane Seymour, are recording as watching the Midsummer Marchers that would become the Lord Mayor's Show from the loggia of the Hall. Around this time Francis Wren, grandfather of Christopher Wren was a member of the company

Sir Thomas Gresham, founder of the Royal Exchange, was a member of the Mercers. He was admitted in 1543 aged 24 as a liveryman, and later that year he left England for the Low Countries, where, either on his own account or that of his father or uncle, he carried on business as a merchant whilst acting in various matters as agent for King Henry VIII.

The Dead Christ, one of the most important surviving works of late English Catholic sculpture prior to the iconoclasm of the Reformation, was secretly preserved in a sand-filled pit under the chapel floor, only being found during repairs after the bomb damage of World War Two.

Inigo Jones was admitted as a member in 1620.

The building was destroyed in the Great Fire of London in 1666.

The second Hall, designed by Edward Jarman and John Oliver, opened in May 1676.

Following the Napoleonic Wars the first Viscount Hill, the Peninsular general, a relative (via his uncle, Ralph Hill) of the Lord Mayor of the same name was admitted to the company honouring his soldiering.

The Hall was extensively refurbished during the period 1877 to 1881 (the porch of the 1676 building is now incorporated into the facade of Swanage Town Hall).

The frontage was remodelled by George Barnes Williams and the interiors were redesigned by John Gregory Crace, the renowned Victorian designer. The Hall was destroyed by fire in 1941 during the Blitz. The third and present Mercers' Hall was opened in May 1958. The architect was E. Noel Clifton of Gunton and Gunton. The Hall incorporates fittings from the old Hall, including some 17th-century woodwork and Victorian stained glass.

The Mercers' Company is the only City Livery Company to have its own private chapel.

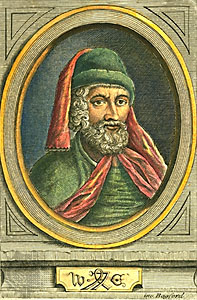
William Caxton was a Mercer in the 15th century.

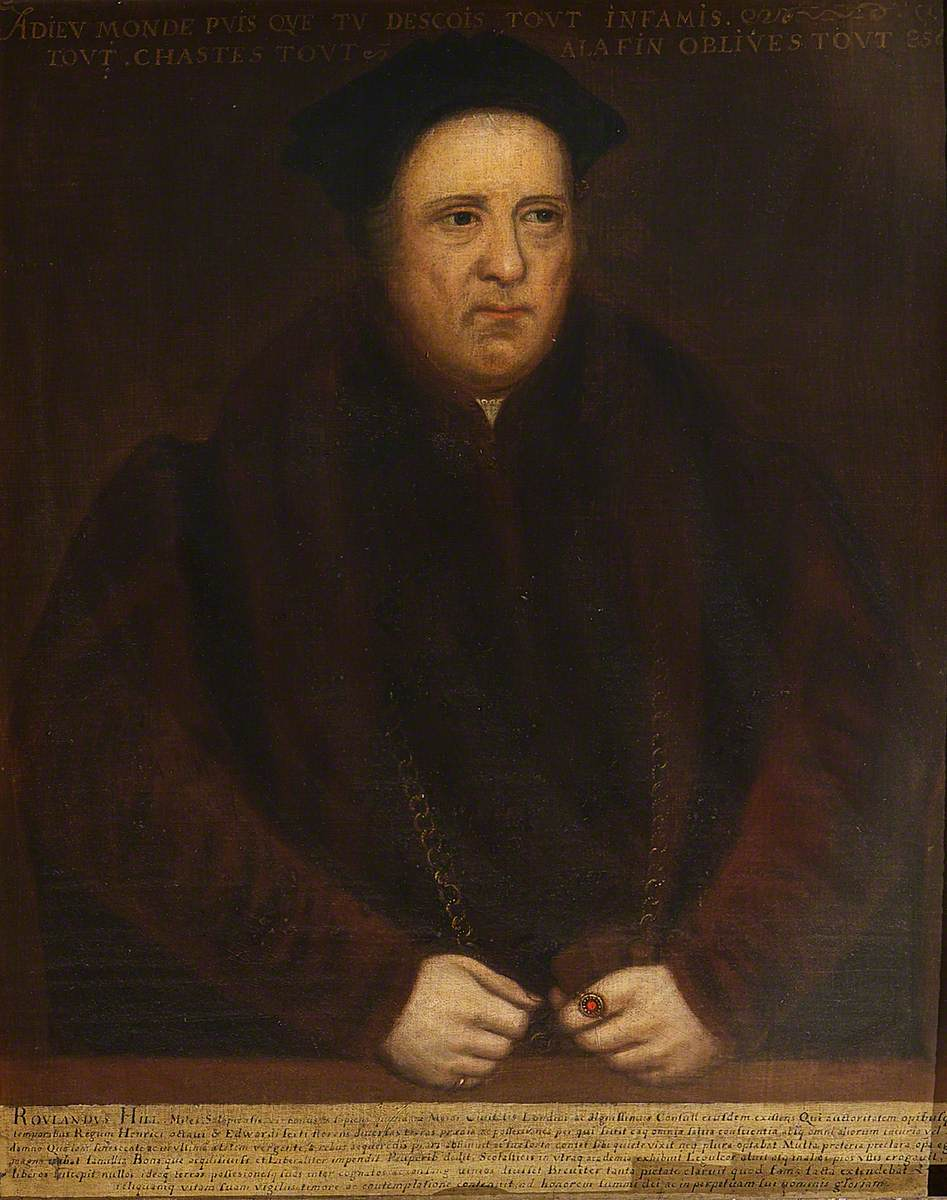
Sir Rowland Hill, convener of the Geneva Bible project, was repeatedly master of the company in the mid 16th century.

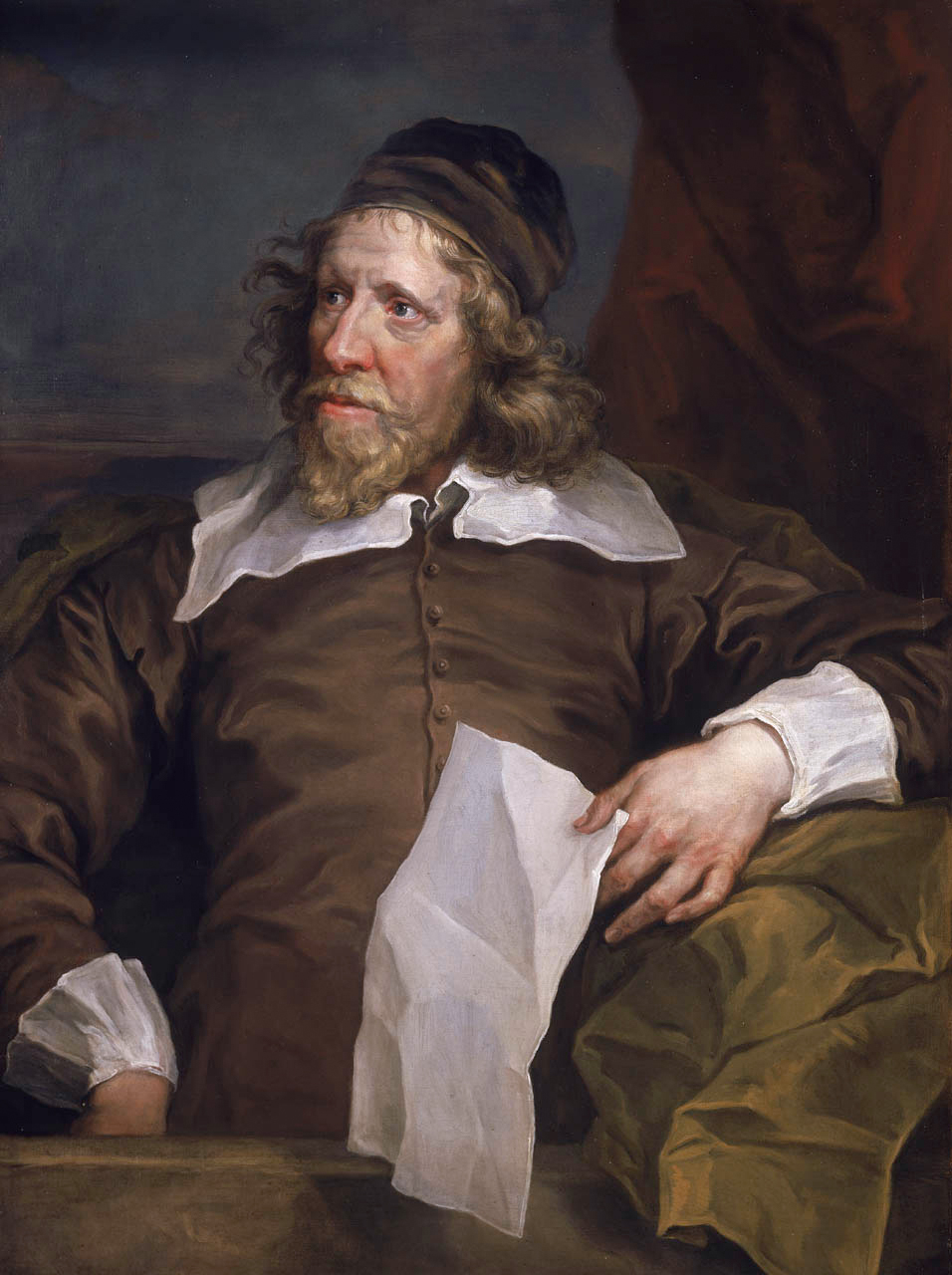
Inigo Jones was admitted to the Mercers in 1620.

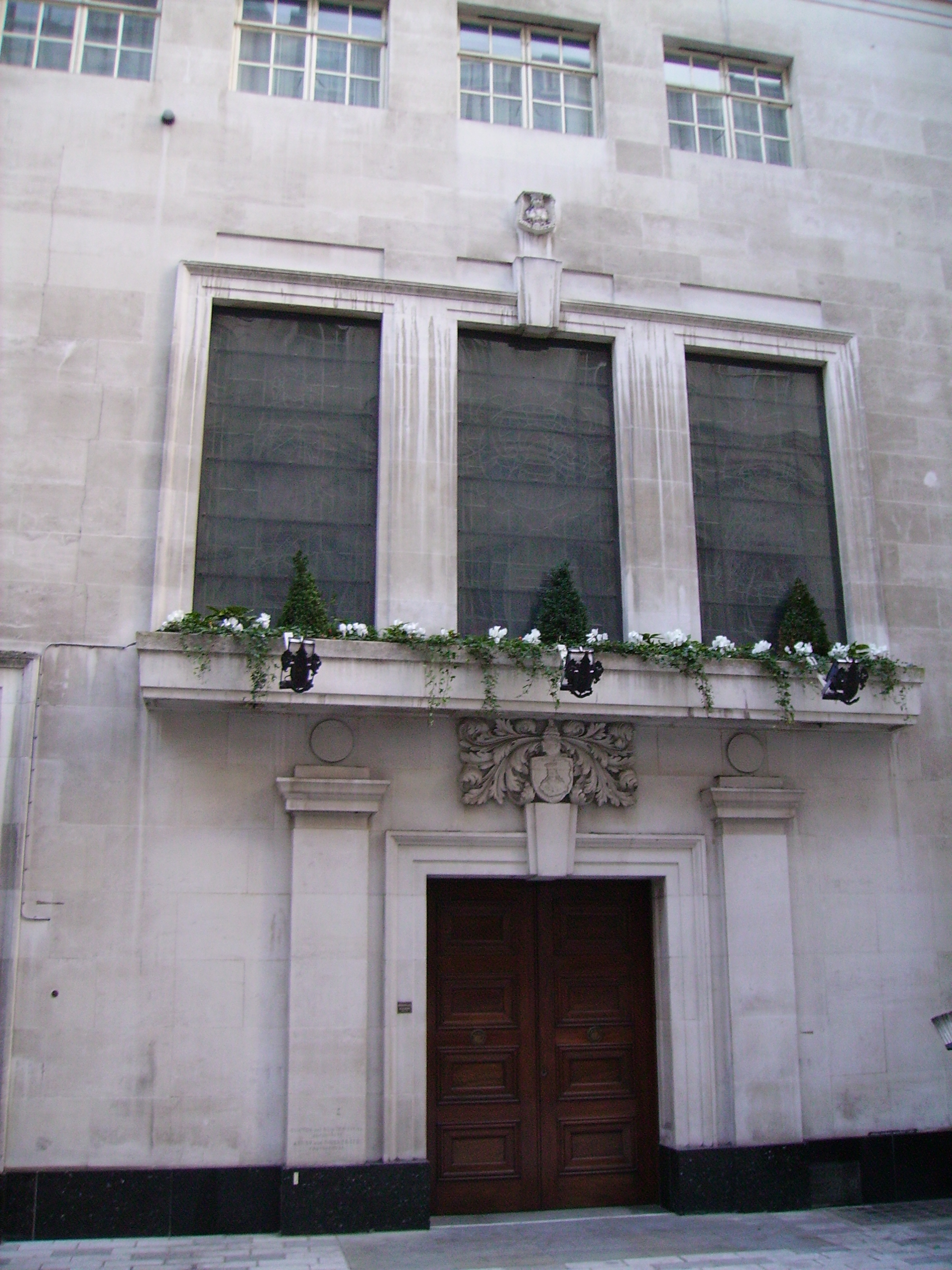
Mercers' Hall in Ironmonger Lane

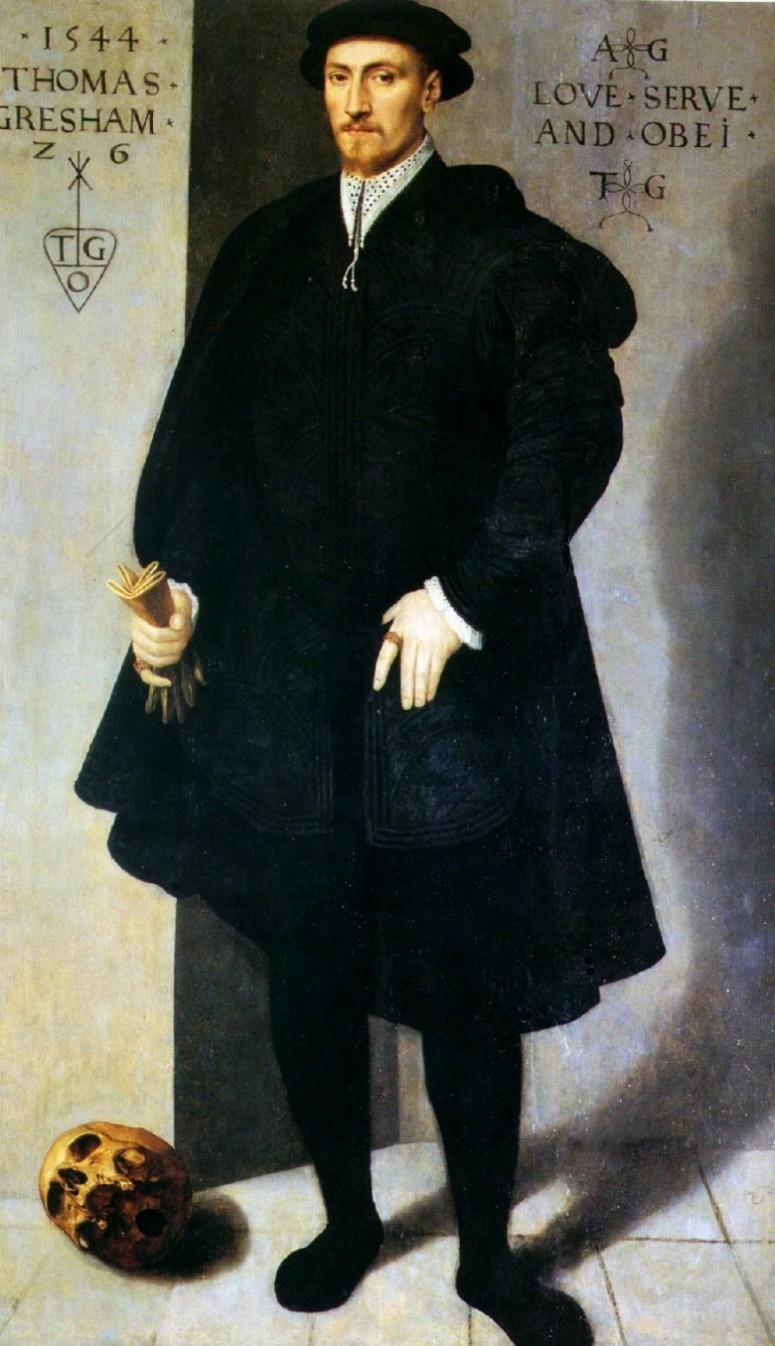
Thomas Gresham, painted in 1544

== Membership ==
Children whose father or mother was a member of the Company at the time of their birth have an automatic right to become Mercers by "patrimony".

Most other members have a family connection to the company and obtain their Freedom by Redemption. Under this process applicants are recommended for membership after an interview and, if approved, they pay a sum of money called a "fine".

Other people can also become Members by Redemption. Membership is sometimes granted because the Company wishes to honour the individual. Notable Members who joined the company by Redemption are Thomas More and Winston Churchill.

One other route to membership is by apprenticeship, but this has not happened recently. In the early days this was a very usual route; an apprentice would be "bound" to a Member for a term of about seven years, but in exchange the member was required to teach the apprentice such that he was worthy of membership by the end of the term, when he became a "Freeman", for he was no longer bound. Freemen of a Livery Company can apply to become Freemen of the City of London, which used to carry certain privileges, such as the right to drive a flock of sheep without charge over London Bridge.

== Etymology ==
The word "mercer" derives from the Latin merx, mercis, 'merchandise' from which root the word "merchant" is also derived.

The words mercero and mercier, still used in Spanish and French respectively, have meanings similar to haberdasher, although London's medieval mercers engaged in trade much more generally than that specifically later devolved to the Worshipful Company of Haberdashers.

== Charitable activities ==
In education, the company has administered St Paul's School since 1509 (and its prep school St Paul's Juniors), St Paul's Girls' School since 1904, two prep schools in London, The Hall School and Bute House, and retains close links with Collyer's College, Dauntsey's School, Abingdon School, Peter Symonds College and Gresham College, all founded by mercers. In recent times the company has founded a City Technology College (Thomas Telford School) and two City Academies (Walsall Academy and Sandwell Academy).

There was also a Mercers' School which was granted its first charter in 1447, and closed in 1959 when pupil numbers fell. The school was most recently based in Barnard's Inn in Holborn, now the home of Gresham College.

In 2011, the Mercers co-sponsored a new academy school, Hammersmith Academy, specialising in creative and digital media and information technology, located in Hammersmith. The school was established in a new building, with support from the Mercers and the Worshipful Company of Information Technologists.

== Coat of arms ==
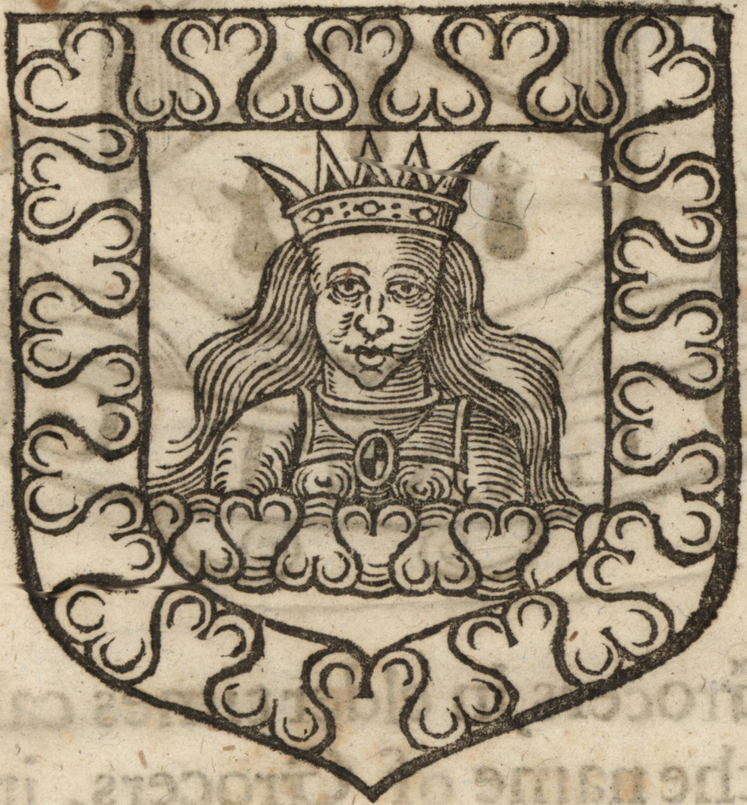
Arms of the Mercers Company, published in 1633, confirmed with additional detail by the College of Arms in 1911

The origin of the "Mercers' Maiden", the heraldic emblem of the company, is not known. Unlike most of the City livery companies, the Mercers had no early grant of arms but the 1425 charter granted a common seal. A few impressions of the early seal survive showing a greatly simplified version of the present coat of arms. The fifteenth century Wardens' Accounts reveal that, even then, the Company required the device of the Maid's Head to be displayed on its property. In 1530 the Company stated to the College of Heralds that they had no arms but only a Maid's Head for their common seal and in 1568 the Heralds registered the seal as the company's arms.

In 1911, the College of Arms confirmed the arms and granted the company a crest and motto, 'Honor Deo' (Honour to God). The grant blazons the arms: Gules, issuant from a bank of clouds a figure of the Virgin couped at the shoulders proper vested in a crimson robe adorned with gold the neck encircled by a jeweled necklace crined or and wreathed about the temples with a chaplet of roses alternately argent and of the first and crowned with a celestial crown the whole within a bordure of clouds also proper.

== Current activities ==
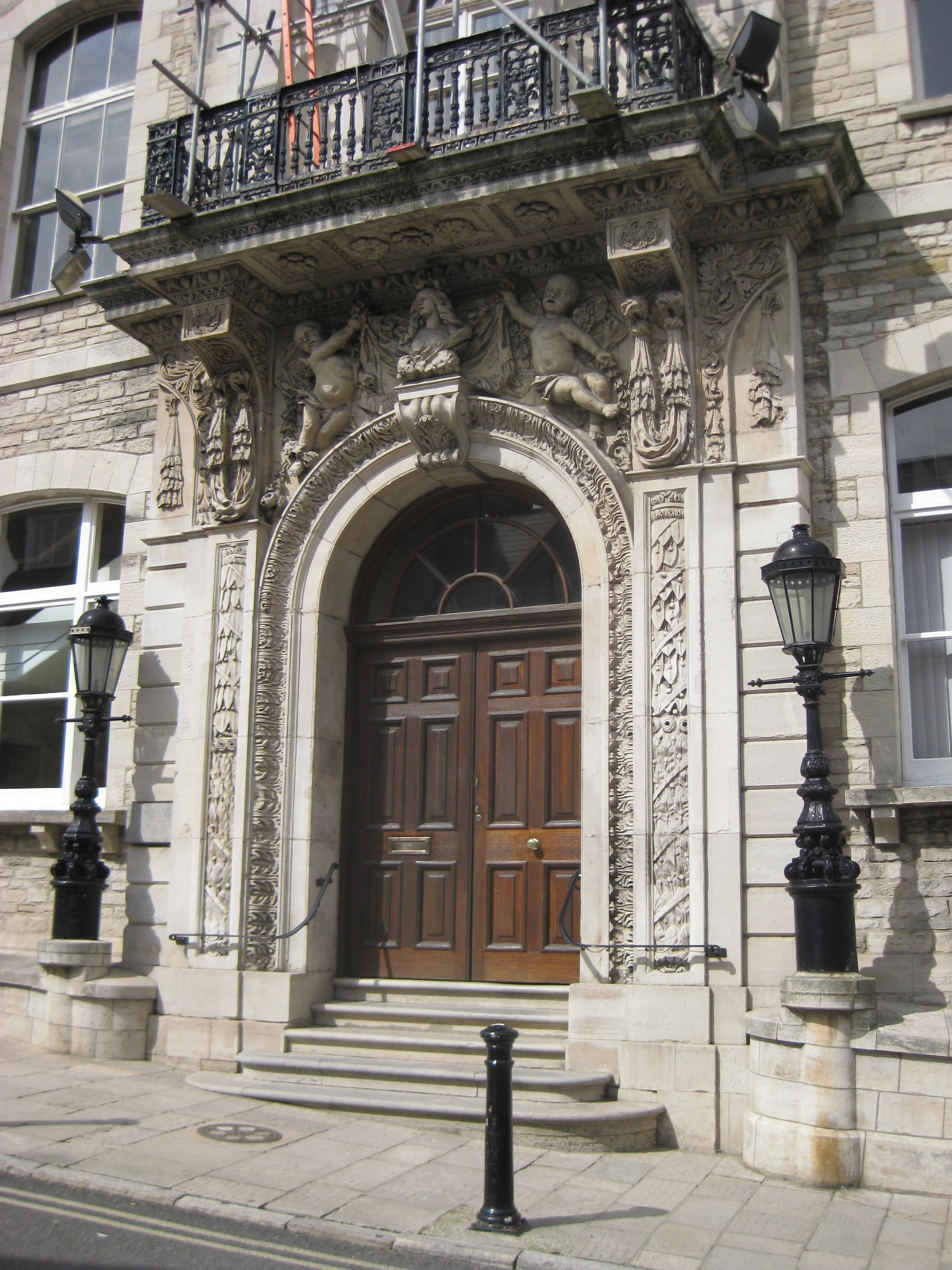
Porch of the 1676 hall, now in Swanage

Every year the Mercers' Company publishes an annual review of their activities. The property portfolio includes 90 residential flats in Covent Garden. In an average year they might give away £7 million, about one-sixth of the total charitable contributions of 111 livery companies.

== Mercers ==
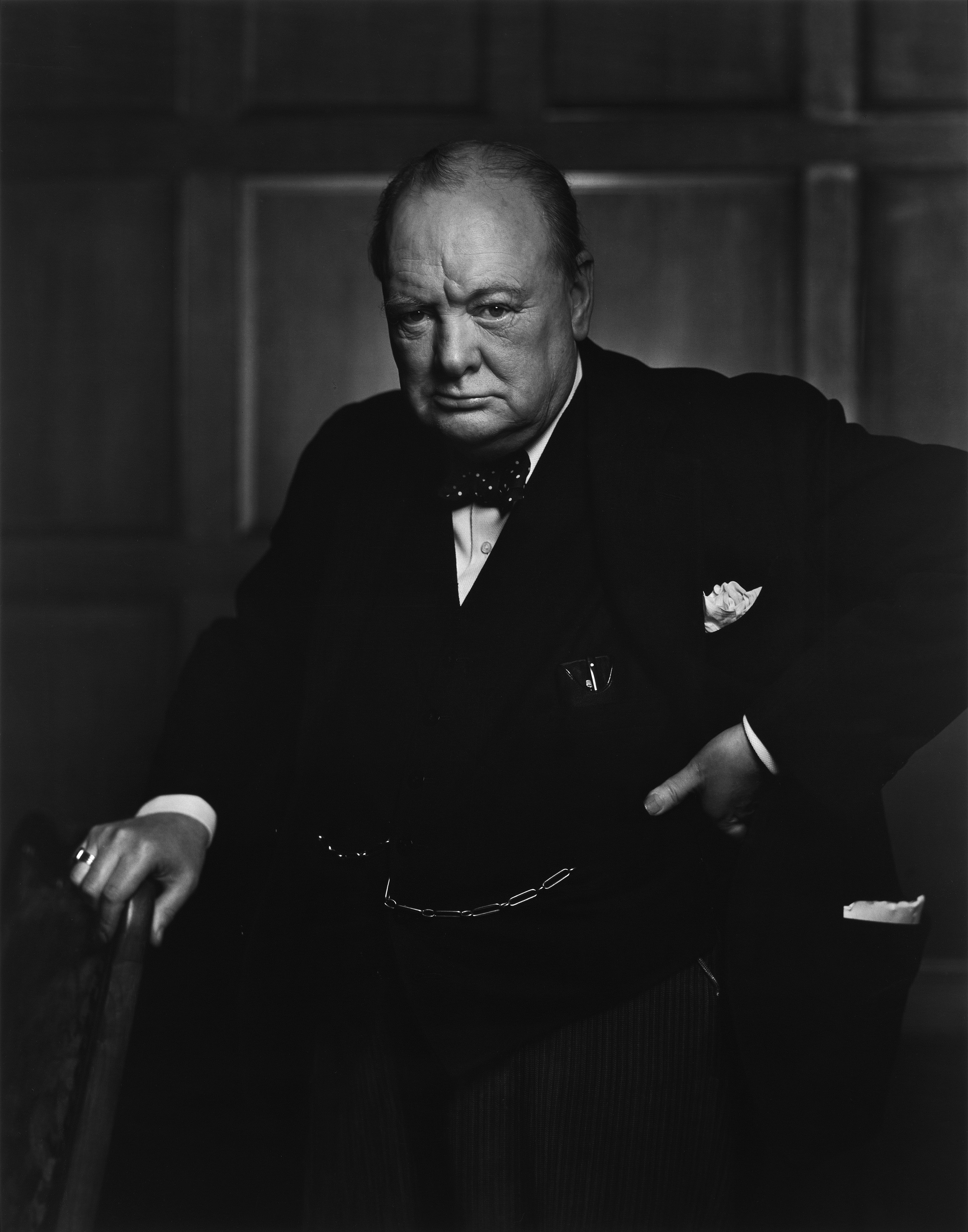
Sir Winston Churchill

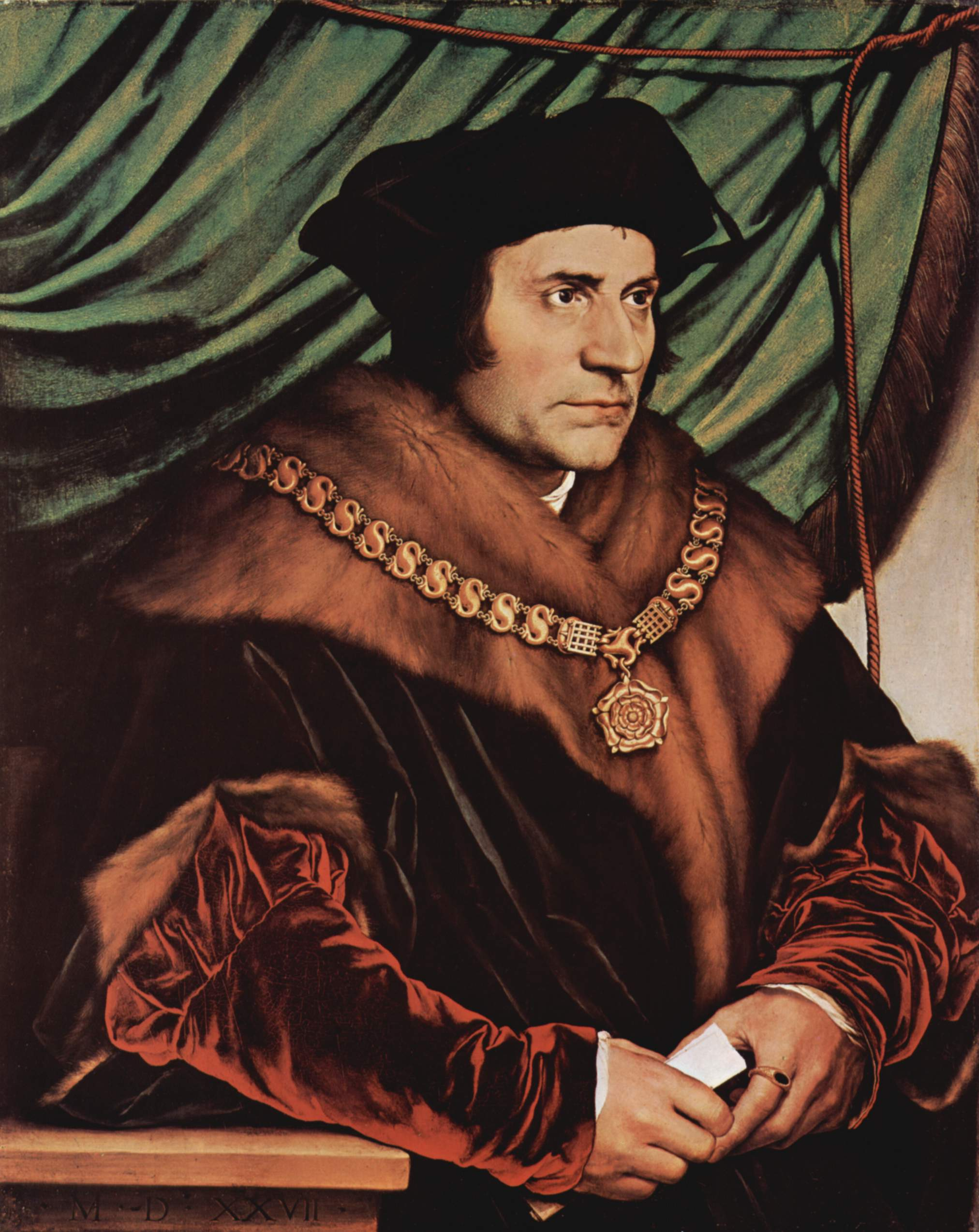
Sir Thomas More

More and Churchill were made members by Redemption.

Famous Mercers include:

- Serlo le Mercer, Third Lord Mayor of London and negotiator of Magna Carta
- William Caxton, printer
- Sir John Thynne (c. 1513–1580), builder of Longleat
- John Dee (1527–1608), mathematician and astrologer
- Lionel Duckett (1511–1587), Sheriff of London (1565), Lord Mayor of London (1572)
- Richard Whittington, Mayor of the City of London
- Sir Rowland Hill of Soulton (d.1561), "The First Protestant Lord Mayor of London", privy councillor, statesman, scholar, merchant and patron of art and philanthropist who coordinated the Geneva Bible translation and may have been the inspiration for Shakespeare's play "As You Like It"
- Sir John Gresham, Mayor of the City of London
- Sir Richard Gresham, merchant and Mayor of the City of London
- Sir Thomas Gresham, merchant, financier and founder of Gresham College
- John Roysse (1500/01–1571), merchant and benefactor
- Roundell Palmer, 1st Earl of Selborne (1812–1895), Lord Chancellor
- William Palmer, 2nd Earl of Selborne KG GCMG PC (1859–1942), politician and High Commissioner of South Africa
- Cecil Clementi (1875–1947), Governor of Hong Kong
- Harry Hodson, economist, editor of The Sunday Times (1950–61)
- Robert Baden-Powell, 1st Baron Baden-Powell, founder of the Scout movement
- Earl Jellicoe, Lord Privy Seal (1970–73).
- Sir Alexander Graham, Lord Mayor of the City of London
- Sir Ralph Verney, (1410–1478), Lord Mayor of the City of London
- John Colet (1467–1519), founder of St Paul's School, London and dean of St Paul's Cathedral

== See also ==
- Kilrea—Mercers plantation settlement in Northern Ireland
