= William Hardell =

Fourth Lord Mayor of London

William Hardnell

4th Lord Mayor of London
- In office 1215–1216
- Preceded by: Serlo le Mercer
- Succeeded by: Jacob Alderman

Personal details
- Born: 1175
- Died: 1226 (aged 50–51)

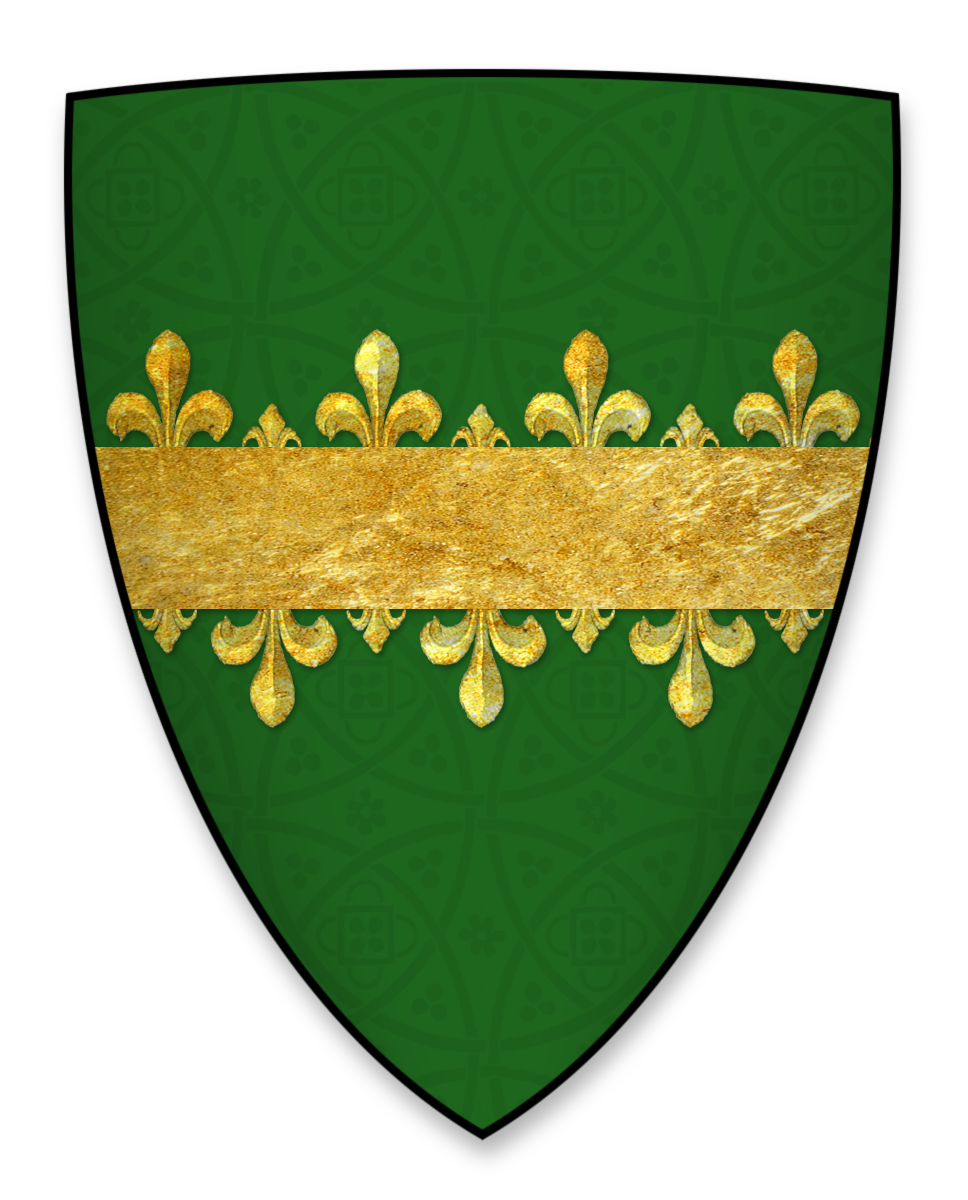
Arms of William Hardell, Lord Mayor of London

William Hardell was a Mayor of London and a Magna Carta surety.

He was appointed Sheriff of the City of London in 1207 and elected Mayor of London (a century later known as Lord Mayor of London) in 1215.

After the sealing of Magna Carta by King John in 1215, he was appointed to be one of the Enforcers, sometimes called Sureties, of Magna Carta. The list of enforcers does not appear on Magna Carta itself and the first surviving list of these was by Matthew Paris the chronicler of St Albans.
