= Jacob Alderman =

English Lord Mayor of London

- Died: London
- Known for: Fifth Lord Mayor of London
- Predecessor: William Hardell
- Successor: Salomon de Basing

Jacob Alderman was a Sheriff of London in 1200 and Mayor of London during 1216 from Easter to the Feast of Pentecost when he died in office. He was succeeded by Salomon de Basing.

== See also ==
- List of Lord Mayors of London
