= Adam de Basing =

English politician

- Born: London
- Died: London
- Occupation: Draper
- Known for: Seventh Lord Mayor of London

Adam de Basing (died c.1266) was a 13th-century English politician and Mayor of London. The scion of a London political family, he was the son of alderman Peter Basing and grandson of an earlier mayor, Salomon de Basing. Adam was a draper who supplied the household of Henry III, for which he was rewarded with several pieces of property in the Bassishaw and Milk Street areas. He served as sheriff in 1243/1244, alderman from 1247 - 1260, and mayor in 1251/1252. He married a woman named Desiderata and they had at least one son, Thomas de Basing, who entered the wool trade but died young. Another of their children, Joan, married Henry le Walleis, who would later serve five terms as mayor of London. Basinghall Street in London is named after his family.
