= Serlo le Mercer =

Third Lord Mayor of London

3rd and 7th Lord Mayor of London
- In office June 1214, 1217, – End of 1214, 1221
- Preceded by: Roger FitzAlan
- Succeeded by: William Hardell and in 1223 – Richard Renger

Personal details
- Born: c. 115?
- Died: c. between 1209 and 1229

Serlo le Mercer was Mayor of London for five terms in the early 1210s. He was a member of the Worshipful Company of Mercers and was one of the negotiators of Magna Carta.

== See also ==
- List of lord mayors of London
