= Henry fitz Ailwin =

English merchant, politician and landowner

Henry fitz Ailwin de Londonestone
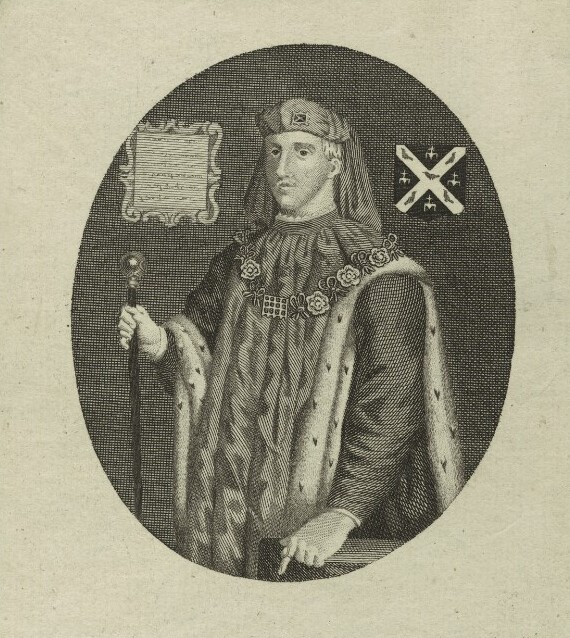
- Engraving of Henry fitz Ailwin

1st Lord Mayor of London
- In office 1189–1212
- Preceded by: Office established
- Succeeded by: Roger FitzAlan

Personal details
- Born: c. 1135 London
- Died: 19 September 1212
- Spouse: Marguérite de Londres
- Relations: Son of Ailwin fitz Leofstan, brother of Alan fitz Ailwin.
- Children: Peter fitz Henry; Alan fitz Henry; Thomas fitz Henry; Richard fitz Henry
- Occupation: Merchant
- Profession: Mayor of London

Henry fitz Ailwin de Londonestone (c.1135 – 19 September 1212) was an English merchant, politician and landowner who served as the first mayor of London from 1189 to 1212. In office from about 1189 until his death in 1212, FitzAilwin remains London's only mayor to be elected for life.

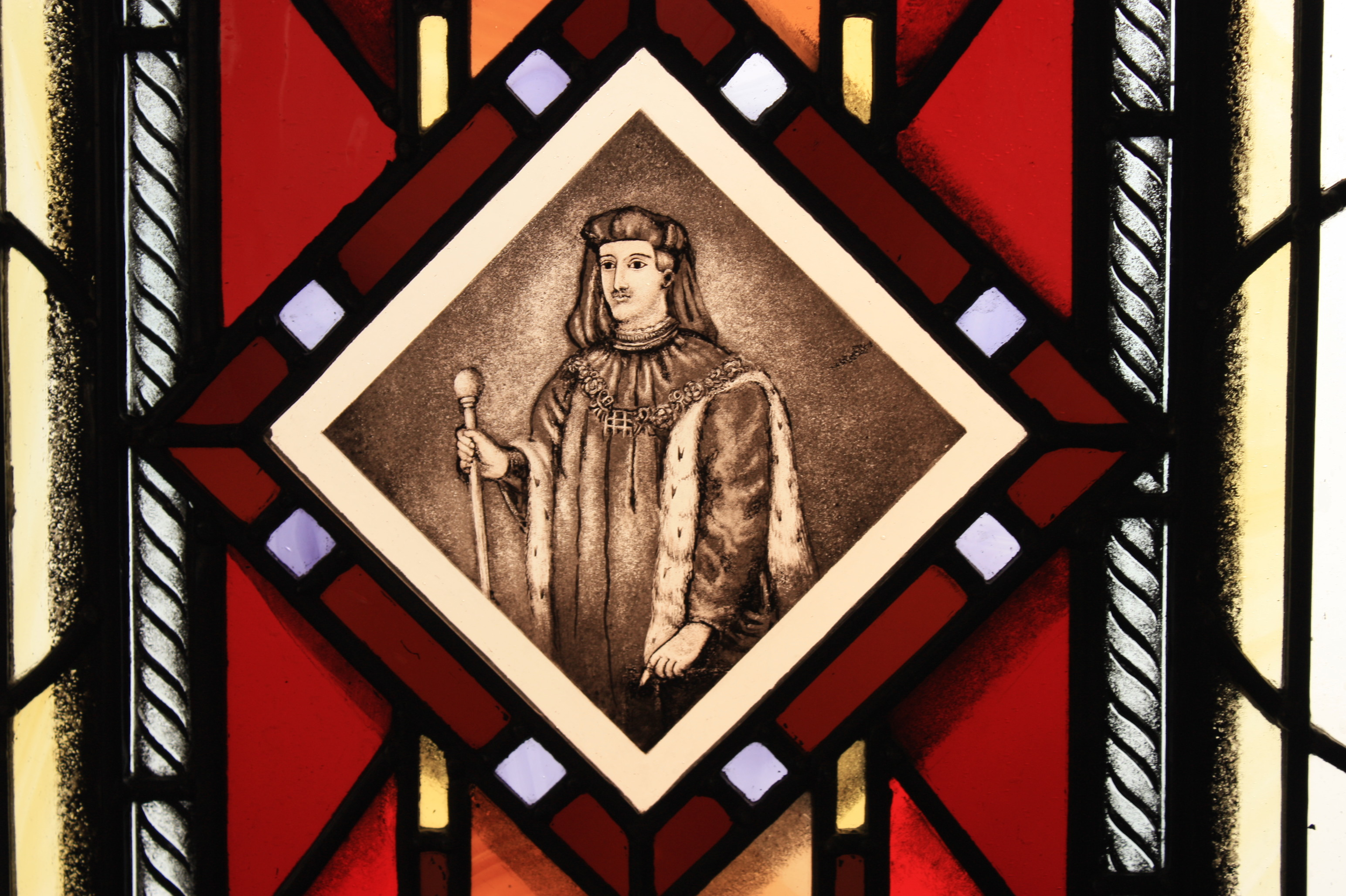
Stained glass at the Guildhall, London, showing Henry fitz Ailwin

== Origins ==
Of Anglo-Saxon rather than Norman descent, fitz Ailwin's family were prominent merchants originally from Kent who became active in the civic life of London since before the Norman Conquest. His grandfather Leofstan (died 1115) served as Portreeve of London, and in 1108 was instrumental in the foundation of Holy Trinity Priory. The family house of his father Ailwin fitz Leofstan (1100–1165) was where the husting court of the City convened. The husting court was a meeting of aldermen, and other leading citizens, where important decisions were made about the rapidly growing City of London and was related to the 'Folkmoot', or people's meetings, an earlier, English tradition. Henry Fitz-Ailwin's uncle Robert was Bailiff of the Weavers' Company in 1130.

Henry FitzAilwin was also descended from Derman and Alward, nobles who acted as thegns, or 'gentleman retainers' to King William I, and in 1086, were recorded as holding a manor at Watton, granted to them by King William for their service to the Crown. Watton had previously belonged to Ailwin Horne, who was a thane during the reign of King Edward the Confessor. Alward died without issue, and Derman's heir was his brother Leofstan, father of Ailwin or Elwyn, and grandfather of Henry FitzAilwin.

== Career ==
Fitz Ailwin's business interests probably centred on making, finishing, and selling cloth. In politics, he was an alderman by 1168 and became one of the most influential men in the city. Under King Richard I and his brother King John, the crown's need to raise finance from London businessmen resulted in the grant of greater autonomy to the city, which previously had been governed by a portreeve, an officer of the crown. Instead, the office of mayor emerged, with Fitz Ailwin first named as such in 1194.

In 1193, in the years before his appointment as Mayor, he was one of those entrusted with the money collected for the King's ransom. He was likely a man of wealth and high regard, having been chosen from among his peers for the office of Mayor. He was likely a remarkable man, who was able to diplomatically maintain acceptability to different political factions, as well as both King John and King Richard. In 1208 he negotiated for the use of ground outside the walls as a city burial ground. After the great fire of 1212, he and other city officials issued a code governing new building that expressly emphasized fire prevention and safety. FitzAilwin promulgated the law known as the Assize of Building that forms the basis of the modern law of trespass. The Lex de Assisa authorised ten men, who became known as alder men. Since the devastating fire of Stephen's reign had gutted all London, FitzAilwin was decided that some efforts should be made to bring in Regulations to build houses in stone. The Assize of Nuisance was described by Bracton in his Notes as being applicable to property freeholders, so the damage had to be seen to be believed. According to Glanvill the case was a variant of the novel disseisin, upon which the owner could sue for the damage caused. As parliament's powers grew it developed into twelve men chosen at full Hustings, originally held in FitzAilwin's house, that laid the foundations of the jury system at assizes.

He gave generously to church causes, with endowments to Holy Trinity Priory, St Bartholomew's Hospital, Westminster Abbey, the Chapel of St Thomas on the Bridge completed in 1209, and to the nunneries of St Mary, Clerkenwell and Godstow. He contributed to the foundation of St Mary Spital, and at Watton-at-Stone was remembered as the founder of a chapel. He died on 19 September 1212 and was buried in Holy Trinity Priory, where his tomb could still be seen in the sixteenth century. There was also a memorial to him in the church of St Mary Bothaw.

== Landholdings ==
Henry fitz Ailwin's main home and business headquarters was in a large house behind St Swithin's Church (a church since demolished), near London Stone accessed off both St Swithin's Lane or Candlewick Street, now Cannon Street. The house eventually became the site of Salter's Hall. In early documents, Henry is recorded as being 'of Londonstone', the mysterious and ancient stone, traditionally associated with London, and the leadership of London.

In 1165 he and his brother Alan inherited their father's lands, including those at Watton-at-Stone in Hertfordshire, which became his country home. He also owned many premises in the eastern half of London and at Edmonton in Middlesex, in Surrey, and beside the Thames in Kent.

== Family ==
His widow was named Margaret and was probably the mother of his four sons: Peter, Alan, Thomas and Richard. Peter, the eldest, married Isabel, daughter of Bartholomew de Chesney, of Addington, Surrey, they had children, including a daughter Margaret, Peter died between 1203 and 1211, before his father. Henry Fitz-Ailwin died in 1212. His wife Margaret, and three sons all survived him.

Henry's son Alan married, and is known to have had at least one child, Robert FitzAlan, and is buried at Robertsbridge Abbey in East Sussex. Henry FitzAilwin's heiress was his granddaughter Joan (daughter of his eldest son Peter). Joan FitzPeter married William IV Aguillon and in 1235 was the mother of Sir Robert II Aguillon.

Former Chilean president Patricio Aylwin Azócar is a distant descendant of his.

Civic offices
Preceded by New title	Mayor of London; 1189–1212	Succeeded by Roger FitzAlan
