= Deane (name) =

Deane is an English surname and given name; a variant of Dean. Notable people with the name include:

== Surname ==
- Anthony Deane (disambiguation), several people
- Basil Deane (1928–2006), musicologist and academic
- Brian Deane (born 1968), English footballer
- Charles Deane (disambiguation), several people
- Charlotte Deane (born 1975), British scientist
- Col Deane (1900–1952), Australian footballer
- Disque Deane (1921–2010), American financier and investor
- Edna Deane (1905–1995), English ballroom dancer, choreographer and author
- Frederic Deane (1868–1952), bishop of Aberdeen and Orkney
- Gilbert A. Deane (1851–1891), New York politician
- Harold Arthur Deane (1854–1908), administrator in British India
- Helen Wendler Deane (1917–1966), American histophysiologist
- Henry Deane (disambiguation), several people
- J. A. Deane, American trombonist and synthesizer musician
- Joe Deane (born 1977), Irish hurling player
- John Deane (disambiguation), several people
- Marjorie Deane (1914–2008), British financial journalist and author
- Marjorie S. Deane, (1923–2003), American fashion authority
- Mary Bathurst Deane (1843–1940), English novelist
- Matthew Deane (born 1978), Thai singer, actor and television presenter
- Nummy Deane (1895–1939), South African cricketer
- Phyllis Deane (1918–2012), British economic historian
- Raymond Deane (born 1953), Irish composer
- Richard Deane (disambiguation), several people
- Robert Deane (disambiguation), several people
- Roderick Deane (born 1941), New Zealand economist, public sector reformer, and businessman
- Ruthven Deane (1851–1934), American ornithologist
- Seamus Deane (1940–2021), Irish poet, critic and novelist
- Silas Deane (1737–1789), US diplomat
- Sydney Deane (1863–1934), cricketer and entertainer, first Australian to appear in a Hollywood movie
- Sir Thomas Deane (1792–1871), Irish architect and Mayor of Cork
- Sir Thomas Manly Deane (1851–1933), Irish architect and son of Thomas Newenham Deane
- Sir Thomas Newenham Deane (1828–1899), Irish architect and son of Thomas Deane
- Walter Deane (1848–1930), American botanist and ornithologist
- William Deane (born 1931), Australian statesman
- William Deane (cricketer) (1857–1936), English cricketer

== Given name ==
- Deane Beman (born 1938), American golfer
- Deane C. Davis (1900–1990), Governor of Vermont
- Deane R. Hinton (1923–2017), career US diplomat and ambassador
- Deane Keller (1901–1992), American artist, academic, soldier, art restorer and preservationist
- Deane Leonard (born 1999), American football player
- Deane Montgomery (1909–1992), mathematician
- Deane Wells, Australian politician
