= Spotswood Football Club =

Spotswood

Names
- Full name: Spotswood Football Netball Club
- Nickname(s): Woodsmen, Woods

Club details
- Founded: 1927; 99 years ago
- Colours: Green Gold
- Competition: Western Region Football League
- Premierships: WRFL Div 1 (15): 1938; 1958; 1968; 1971; 1972; 1977; 1984; 1987; 1990; 1993; 1995; 2007; 2008; 2009; 2011
- Ground: McLean Reserve

Uniforms
Home

Other information
- Official website: spotswoodfc.com.au

The Spotswood Football Netball Club is an Australian rules football club which has competed in the Western Region Football League (WRFL) since 1935. They are based in the Melbourne suburb of Spotswood.

== History ==
The Spotswood Football Club became a member of the FDFL from 1935. They were formed in 1927 and played in the Sub Districts League from 1927 to 1934 They won the 1933 premiership. In 1935 they transferred to the Footscray District Football League.

== Club Song ==
Sung to the tune of Yankee Doodle Boy

We’re a mighty team at Spotswood,
We’re the mighty fighting Woods,
We love our Club and we play to win,
Riding the bumps with a grin At Spotswood,
Come what may you’ll see us fighting,
Teamwork is the thing that counts,
All for one and one for all,
That’s how we play at Spotswood,
We are the mighty fighting Woods!

== VFL/AFL players ==
- Charlie Sutton – Footscray
- Norm Goss – Hawthorn
- Fred Goldsmith – South Melbourne
- Callum Urch – North Melbourne
- Greg Taube - South Melbourne
- Callan Ward – Western Bulldogs/GWS
- Bachar Houli – Essendon/Richmond
- John Dean – South Melbourne
- Spencer White – St Kilda
- John Heriot - South Melbourne
- Ron Viney - South Melbourne
- Issy Grant- Western Bulldogs
- Lachlan Fogarty- Geelong/Carlton
- Jordan Boyd-Carlton
- Logan Morris - Brisbane Lions

== Premierships ==
- Western Region Football League
  - Div 1 (15): 1938, 1958, 1968, 1971, 1972, 1977, 1984, 1987, 1990, 1993, 1995, 2007, 2008, 2009, 2011
  - Div 2 (2): 1944, 1948

== Book ==
- History of the WRFL/FDFL – Kevin Hillier - - ISBN 9781863356015
- History of football in Melbourne's north west - John Stoward - ISBN 9780980592924
