= Rowland Hill (MP) =

Publisher of the Geneva Bible and Tudor Statesman (c.1495–1561)

Sir Rowland Hill
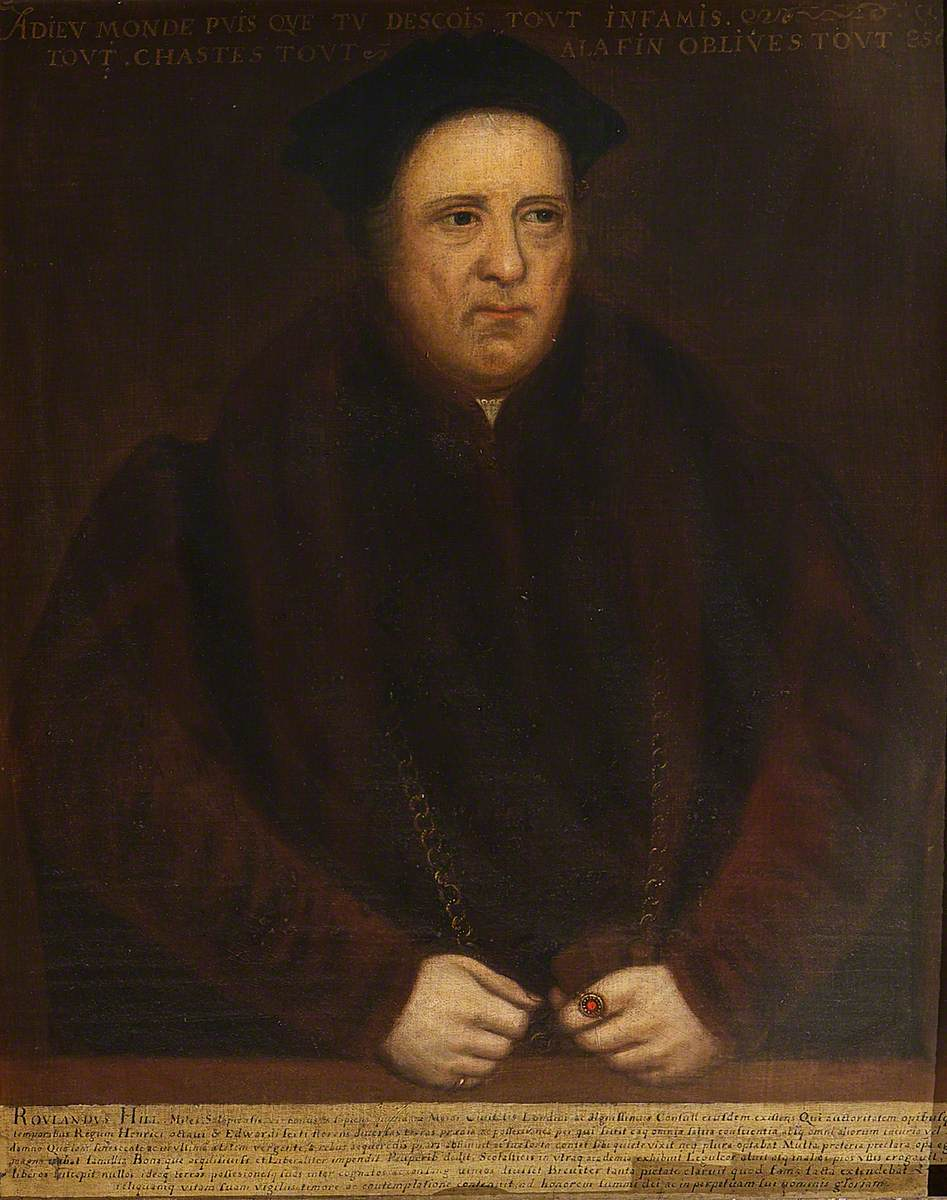
- Portrait of the Rt Hon. Sir Rowland Hill MP

Publisher of the Geneva Bible, Lord Mayor of London, Privy Counsellor, Member of Parliament, Sheriff of London, Member of the Council of Wales and the Marches, Master Mercer

Lord Mayor of London
- In office 1549–1550
- Monarch: Edward VI
- Preceded by: Sir Henry Amcotes
- Succeeded by: Sir Andrew Judde

Sheriff of London
- In office 1542–1543
- Monarch: Henry VIII

Personal details
- Born: c. 1495 Hodnet, Shropshire
- Died: 29 October 1561 London
- Resting place: St Stephen Walbrook, London; 51°30′45.46″N 0°5′23.71″W
- Relations: Viscount Hill; Sir Rowland Hill; Jane Austen; Mary Shakespeare; Reginald Corbet
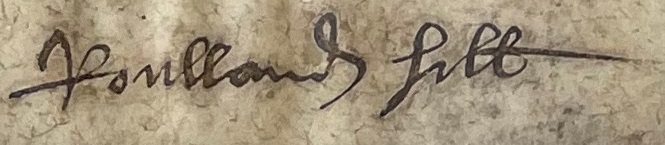
- Signature

Sir Rowland Hill of Soulton (also recorded as Roland or Rouland Hyll or Hylle, and potentially Hall and Haule; c. 1495–1561) was an English polymath, statesman, merchant, and philanthropist. He was a central figure in the publishing and later historiography of the Geneva Bible. While traditionally identified as its 'publisher,' his primary role was that of a high-level patron and state official; as a Commissioner for Ecclesiastical Causes under Elizabeth I, he held the legal authority to oversee and authorize the circulation of religious texts during the Elizabethan settlement.

Hill is remembered as the first Protestant Lord Mayor of London (1549–1550). A prominent figure during the reigns of four Tudor monarchs, he was instrumental in the political and religious shifts of the English Reformation. His legacy is defined by his extensive charitable works, his patronage of the arts, and his status as the likely inspiration for the character "Old Sir Rowland" in William Shakespeare's play As You Like It.

Current historical research, discussed in the House of Commons, suggests that Hill may have acted to preserve and safeguard cultural heritage during the Reformation, with findings indicating he could have helped rescue the relics of Saint Erkenwald and the altar stone from Old St. Paul's Cathedral, housing them at his Shropshire estate.

== Early life ==
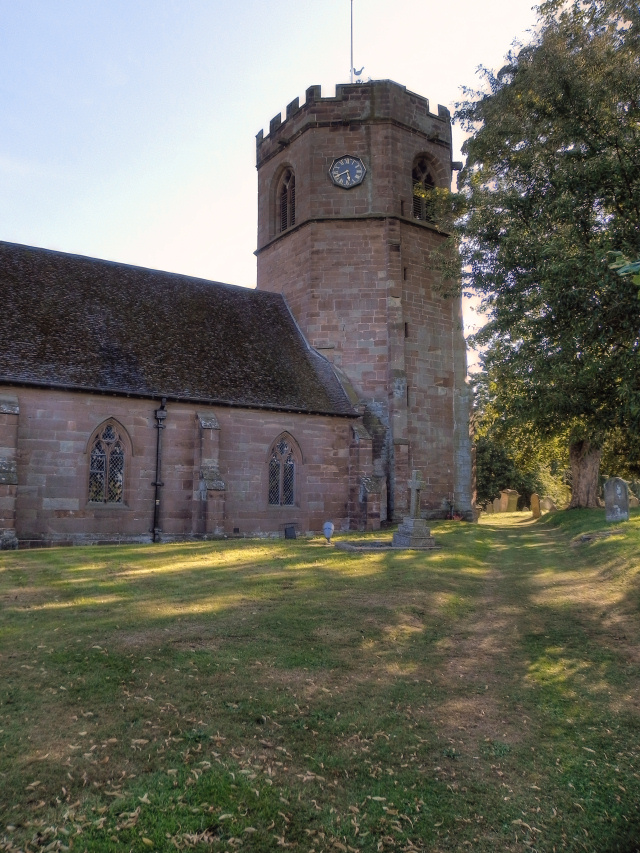
St Luke’s Church, Hodnet, where Hill was baptised

Born in Hodnet, Shropshire, around 1495, Rowland Hill came from an ancient local family with connections to Court of Hill near Hope Bagot and Burford. He was the elder son of Thomas Hill (1460–1506) and Margaret Wilbraham, daughter of Thomas Wilbraham of Woodhey, Cheshire.

He had a younger brother, William (a priest), and four sisters, Agnes, Joan, Jane and Elizabeth. A branch of his family later became the Viscounts Hill.

As a young man, he was apprenticed to a London mercer, Sir Thomas Kitson, Hill was admitted to the Freedom of the Mercers' Company in 1519. He quickly rose to a position of influence within the city. Hill rose to prominence in the City, becoming an Alderman in 1542, and the Worshipful Company of Mercers, serving as Warden for 1535/36, then as Master Mercer for four terms in 1542/43, 1549/50, 1554/55 and 1560/61.

His mercantile career wasn't without risks. In 1538, a ship carrying his cargo was pillaged by Norwegian pirates, resulting in a significant loss of £10,000. Hill and his fellow merchants appealed to Thomas Cromwell for assistance from King Henry VIII, with correspondence from Thomas Thacker to Cromwell recording:

One Mody's ship, with goods of merchants of London, "from the mart," is taken by pirates of Norway, to the loss to Sir Ralph Waryn, good Mr. Lock, Rowland Hyll, and others, of 10,000.

Hill and his fellow merchant ventures suffered a loss of £10,000. The ship was recovered but not the cargo.

== Public offices and political career ==
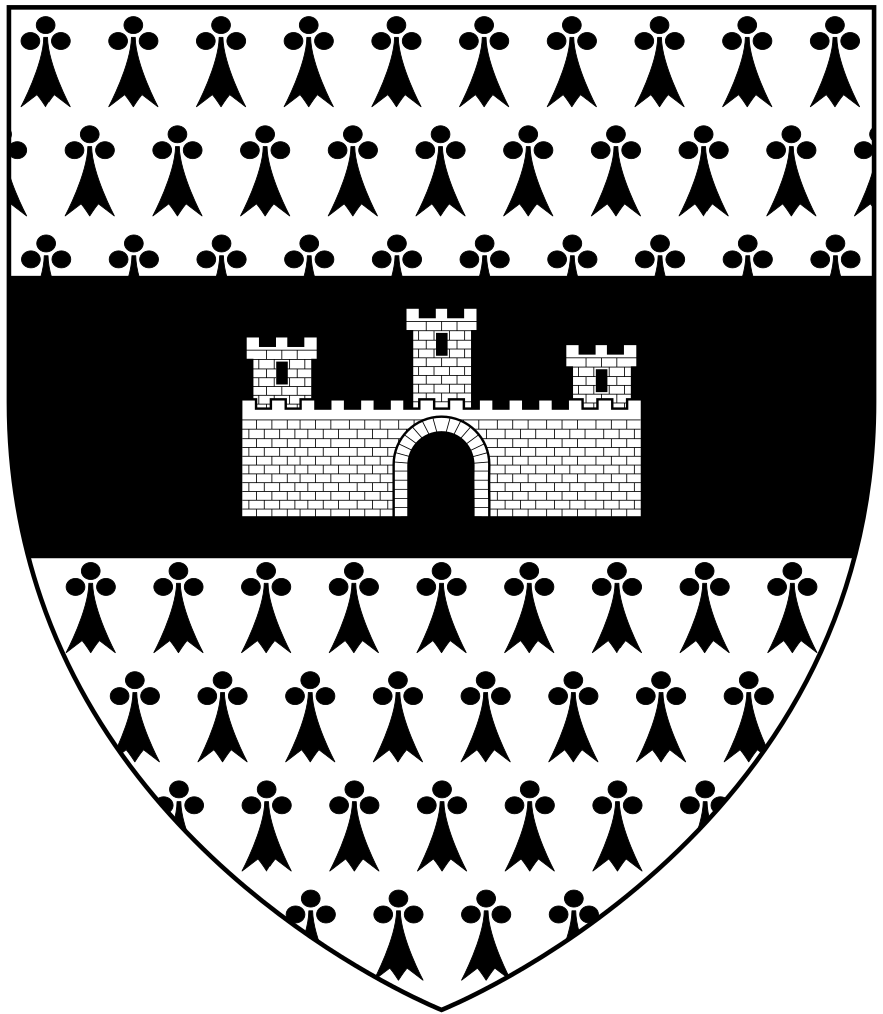
Hill coat of arms

Hill witnessed the surrender of St Bartholomew's Priory to Sir Richard Rich in 1539.

Hill's rise in London politics continued with his election as Sheriff of London for 1541-1542. During this period, he was briefly imprisoned in the Tower of London after obstructing the release of a Member of Parliament who was in debt, an event that highlighted the issue of parliamentary privilege. Despite this, King Henry VIII knighted him shortly after the incident, demonstrating royal favour.

He was elected Lord Mayor of London in 1549, a time of significant religious and political change. Hill oversaw reforms that moved the city toward Protestantism, including the removal of altars. Recent historical research suggests that during this process, Hill secretly preserved the High Altar stone of "Old" St Paul’s Cathedral and the relics of Saint Erkenwald, moving them to his estate at Soulton Hall in Shropshire. He was known as "a good minister of justice" and his mayoralty included a determined campaign against moral offenses.

Hill's career was remarkable for his ability to navigate the dangerous political shifts between the reigns of different monarchs:

- Edward VI: He was as a close friend of Sir Thomas Bromley, a member of the regency council. In the wake of the coup d'état against Lord Protector Somerset, Hill assumed the Lord Mayoralty for the year beginning in November 1549. This was a period of substantial religious uncertainty, but Hill oversaw some of the critical changes in the direction of godly Protestantism, including the removal of altars. Nevertheless, in 1549, as Lord Mayor at the height of the iconoclasm of the Reformation, Hill adjusted the route of his Lord Mayor's Day Procession and said a de profundis at the tomb of Bishop William.
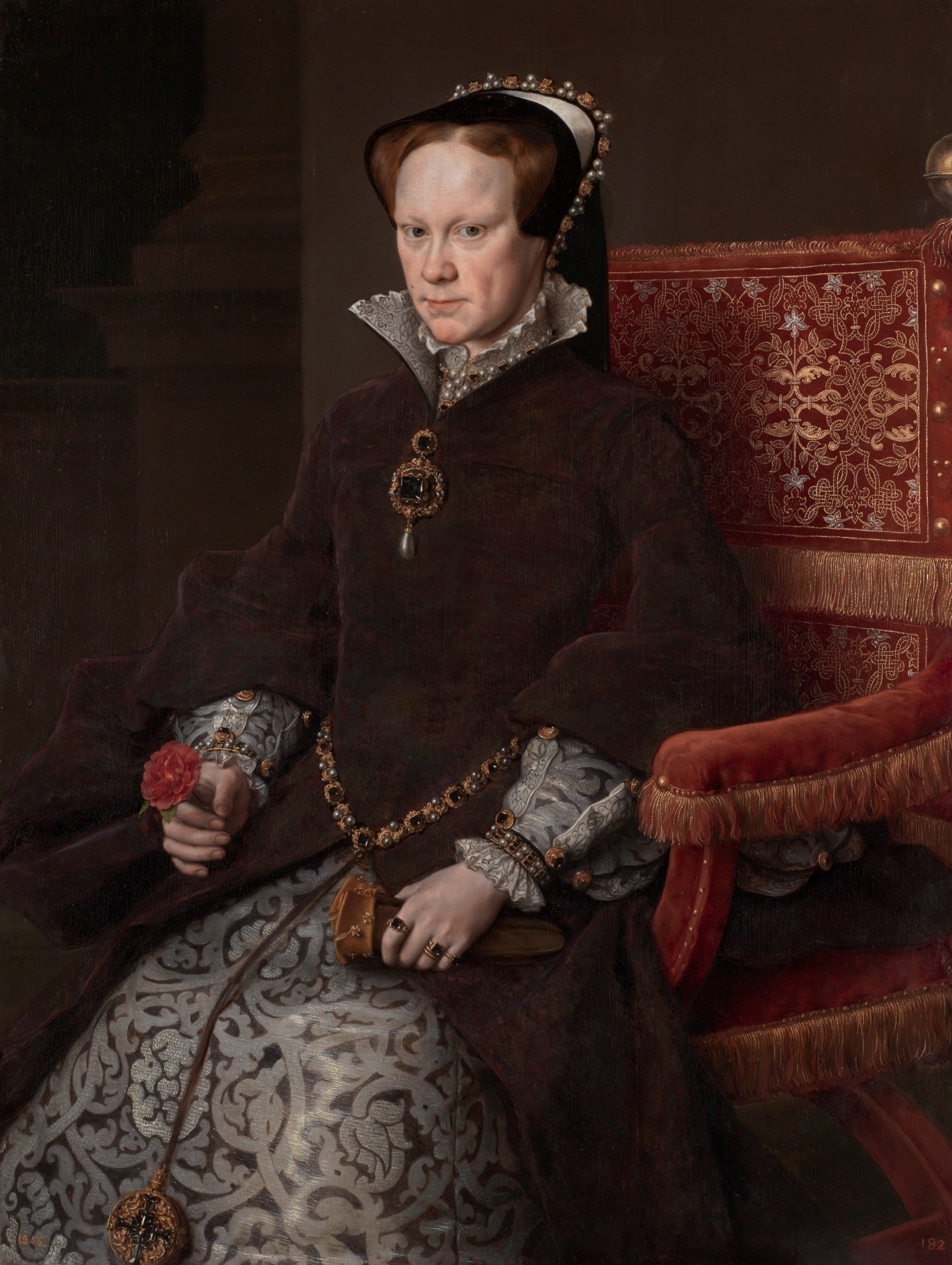
- Queen Mary I
  Mary I: Hill was one of the City's representatives in Queen Mary's first parliament (October–December 1553), temporarily replacing Sir Martin Bowe (a Catholic); with Hill being regarded as a Protestant by many, Sir Robert Broke, Serjeant-at-Law, was considered the only remaining Catholic MP in London. The London delegation was said to have attended that Parliament with an entirely commercial agenda: toiling for legislation to regulate the City of London's physicians, chandlers in both wax and tallow, leather tanners and bowling alleys, as well as a measure to deregulate the sale of wine. Hill endured a short spell of disfavour under Queen Mary and was dropped from commissions of the peace for Middlesex and Shropshire in 1554. He regained the Crown's confidence, however, and in March 1556, when the Sir Henry Dudley conspiracy to depose Mary was discovered (leading to a series of trials for high treason at the Guildhall) he was commissioned as a Justice for oyer and terminer (an assize judge), along with Sir William Garrard (Lord Mayor for 1555/56) presiding), along with Sir Roger Cholmeley, and the Recorder of London, Ralph Cholmeley. In June Sir John Gresham of Titsey took the place of Hill on the bench for the indictment of Silvestra Butler, in the same matter. Hill received from Queen Mary on behalf of the City of London in 1557, two seasoned bucks from Nonesuch Park. Intriguingly, this commission to collect such materials overlaps with the Geneva Bible project in which Hill was also involved. Nevertheless, later in the same year hearing the indictment of Sir Ralph Bagenal for treason.
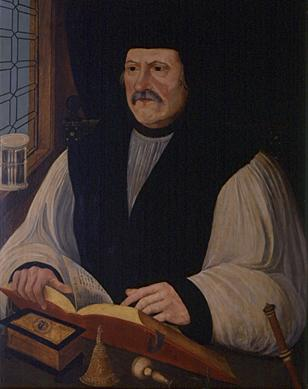
- Archbishop Matthew Parker, who served with Hill on the 1559 Commission for Ecclesiastical Causes
  Elizabeth I: after the accession of Elizabeth he helped put into execution the Act of Supremacy and the Act of Uniformity. It is both remarkable and highly unusual that Hill held commissions to seize prohibited books under both the Protestant Reformation and the Catholic Counter-Reformation.This unique record of holding commissions to seize prohibited books under both Catholic and Protestant rule is a testament to his political pragmatism.

== Networks and associations ==
Sir Rowland Hill cultivated a wide network of influential friends and family throughout his life.

- Political and Business Associates: Hill was a close friend and executor of fellow merchant and alderman Sir John Gresham, who provided him with a black gown to attend his funeral and whose executor he was. He was also a "trusty friend" of Sir Thomas Seymour, (of whom it was said that he "knew much of the intent and purpose") and was given land at Hoxton for life under his Will. Hill was also an overseer for the wills of Sir George Barne, who was Lord Mayor at the death of Edward VI and William Lok (ancestor of the philosopher John Locke). He received a piece of gold in the will of Chief Justice Sir Thomas Bromley (died 1555) ‘for a token of a remembrance for the old love and amity between him and me now by this my decease ended’. He was also an active member and Treasurer of the Company of Merchant Adventurers.
- Family Connections: Through his family's roots in Shropshire, Hill was connected to the Vernon and Stanley families. A notable link this furnishes is to Elizabeth Vernon, who married Henry Wriothesley, 3rd Earl of Southampton, a patron of William Shakespeare. He was a guest of the family at the burial of Sir Thomas Wriothesley.
- Religious Links: Bishop Nicholas Ridley referred to Hill in his farewell letter written before his execution.

== Philanthropy ==
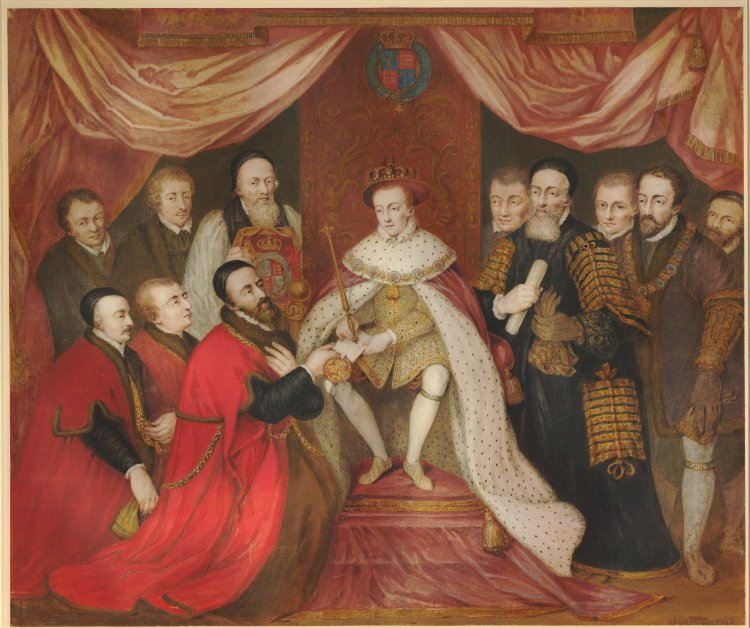
The boy-king Edward VI grants a royal charter in 1553 to Bridewell Hospital in London with Hill as founding President.

Hill had a reputation for charitable virtue. In 1555 he established a school at Market Drayton in Shropshire. He was also closely involved with the establishment of the London Hospitals. He was the first President of Bridewell and Bethlehem Hospitals from 1557 to 1558 and again between 1559 and 1561, and he held the post of Surveyor-General of the London Hospitals from 1559 until his death. Along with Sir Martin Bowes, he prepared, in 1557, The Order of the Hospitals of King Henry the viijth, and King Edward the vjth, viz. St. Bartholomew, Christ's, Bridewell, St. Thomas's. By the Maior, Commonaltie, and Citizens of LONDON; Governours of the Possessions, Revenues, and Goods of the sayd Hospitals, Anno 1557."

Among Sir Rowland's civic and charitable works are to be found, with a focus in Shropshire in particular:

- building at Atcham on the River Tern a new bridge in stone, along with two further timber bridges
- annually clothing 300 of the poor
- repairing Stoke Church
- a dole to the poor of London

Hill also supported schools, the Bethlem asylum and the new Bridewell hospital. In 1557 the administration of Bethlem Royal Hospital became the responsibility of the Bridewell Governors. The office of President was established, Hill serving as its first.

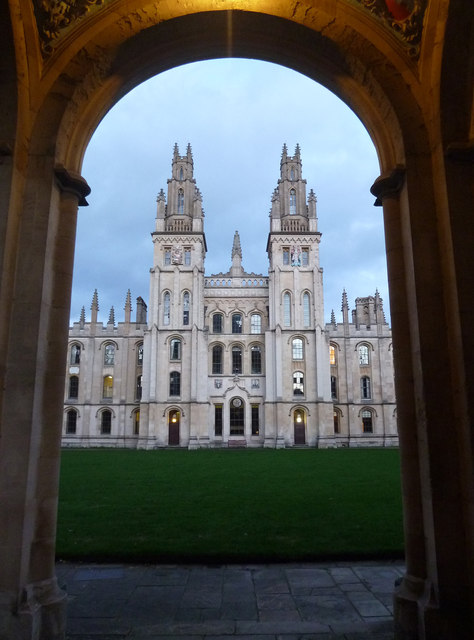
The Hill arms All Souls College, Oxford (upper left)

He founded exhibitions, and educated many students at both Oxford and Cambridge Universities, and supported scholars at the Inns of Court.

Hill shared his prominent role in the establishment of hospitals with Richard Grafton, who also had Shropshire heritage, and who was instrumental in printing the Great Bible.

Hill was also involved in the establishment of early labour exchanges and poverty relief.

== Architectural Patronage and Allegory ==
Hill oversaw building projects characterized by the intellectual rigor of the early English Renaissance. His work at Soulton Hall and in London demonstrates an integration of architectural theory, religious protectionism, and classical philosophy.

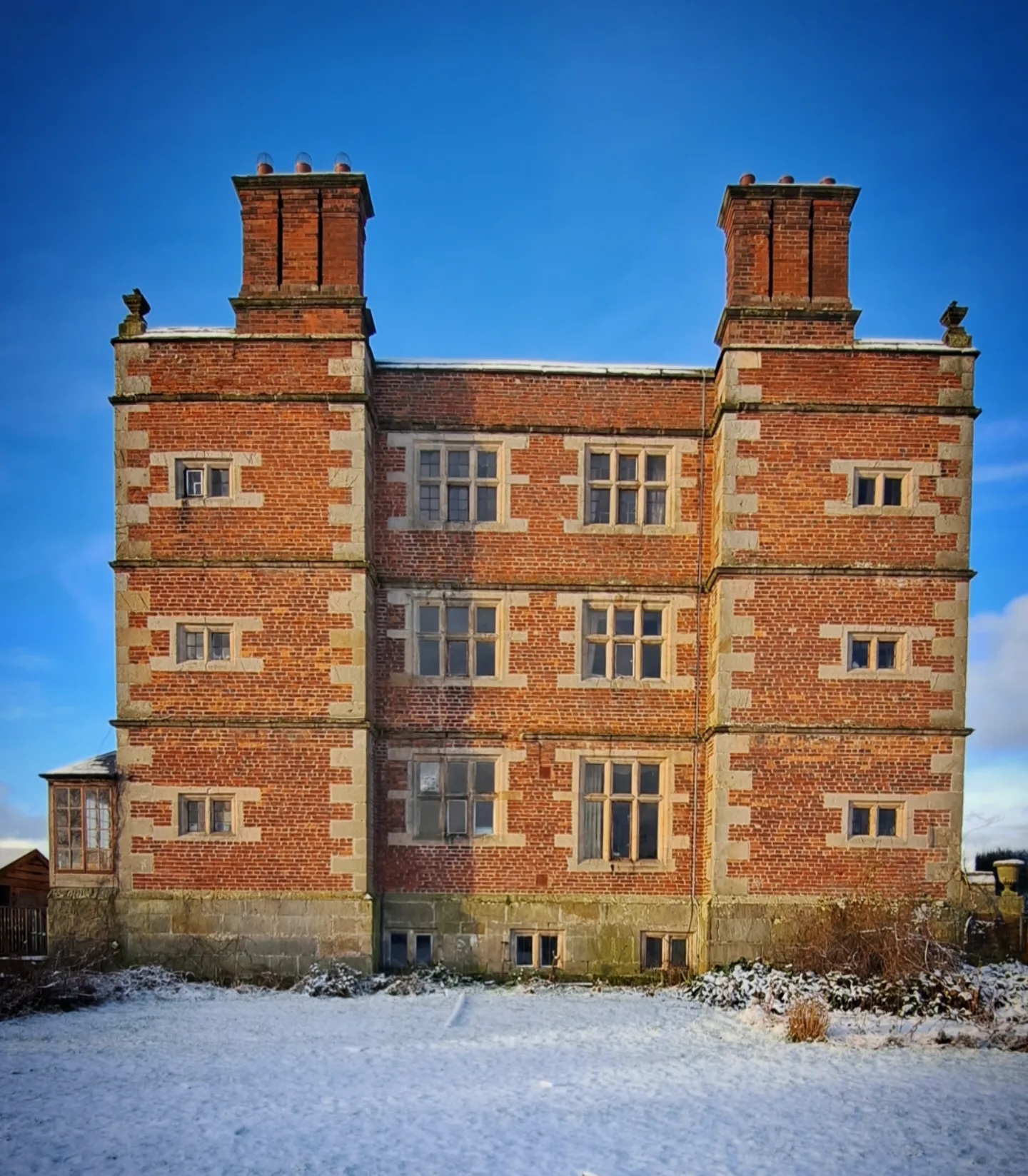
- Soulton Hall
  Soulton Hall: The surviving corps de logis of Hill’s Shropshire estate is recognized for its highly symbolic design. Modern architectural analysis suggests the building functions as a "theatre of memory," incorporating Pythagorean geometry and Neo-Platonic allegories. Scholars have argued that the structure's proportions and "coded" features were intended to reflect the harmony of the Elizabethan Settlement and provide a safe space for intellectual dissent.
- London Townhouse: In 1546, Hill acquired a significant townhouse at Frederick's Place in London. He engineered a physical connection between his private residence, the Mercers' Hall, and the Mercers' Chapel. This complex served as a secure hub for Hill’s mercantile and political activities. Notably, during the height of iconoclastic fervor, a major stone statue of Christ the Saviour was secretly interred within the chapel's foundations. Given Hill's dual role as a master of the Mercers' Company and a crown official, this concealment is widely interpreted as a deliberate act of preservation orchestrated by Hill to protect religious art from destruction.

== Publishing activities ==
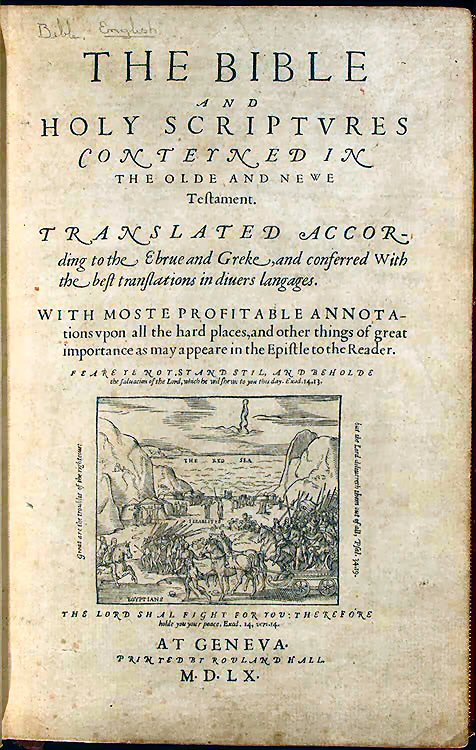
Frontispiece of the 1560 Geneva Bible, bearing Hill's name at the bottom as printer

=== Patronage and Distribution of and Association with the Geneva Bible ===
Sir Rowland Hill occupies a prominent and debated role in the historiography of the Geneva Bible’s introduction to England. For centuries, he has been definitively cited as the primary publisher of the text; however, modern scholarship acknowledges that this was a comprehensive and dangerous act of religious subversion during a period of extreme political volatility.

As a statesman, Hill occupied a distinctive role, serving first as Commissioner Against Heretics under the Catholic Queen Mary I and later as Commissioner for Ecclesiastical Causes under the Protestant Queen Elizabeth I. His service under contrasting religious regimes indicates notable political pragmatism, enabling him to manage and authorize the circulation of religious texts during the Elizabethan Settlement.

The nature of Hill's involvement remains a subject of intense scrutiny, centering on the use of clandestine commercial networks. Most notably, historical attention has focused on a specific printing business that appeared in London to handle the Bible's distribution. This operative functioned for a conspicuously short duration and ceased all operations almost immediately following the probate of Hill's estate in 1561. Because Hill held the legal authority to inquire into "seditious books," any such printer would have required his explicit protection to operate. This indicates that Hill may have established a temporary commercial infrastructure to bypass censorship laws, utilizing his dual status as a crown official and merchant prince.

The cultural legacy of this project is extensive. The Geneva Bible became the standard text for many prominent figures, including William Shakespeare and Oliver Cromwell, and its influence extended to the New World as one of the Bibles carried by the Pilgrims aboard the Mayflower in 1620. By securing the early distribution of this translation, Hill's "comprehensive and dangerous act" provided the foundational text for much of the English-speaking world's subsequent religious and literary history.

=== Other works linked to him via the Geneva Bible Press ===
In addition to his pivotal role with the Geneva Bible, Sir Rowland Hill's association with the press that did that work linked him in Renaissance minds with the printing of over 26 other books between 1559 and 1562.

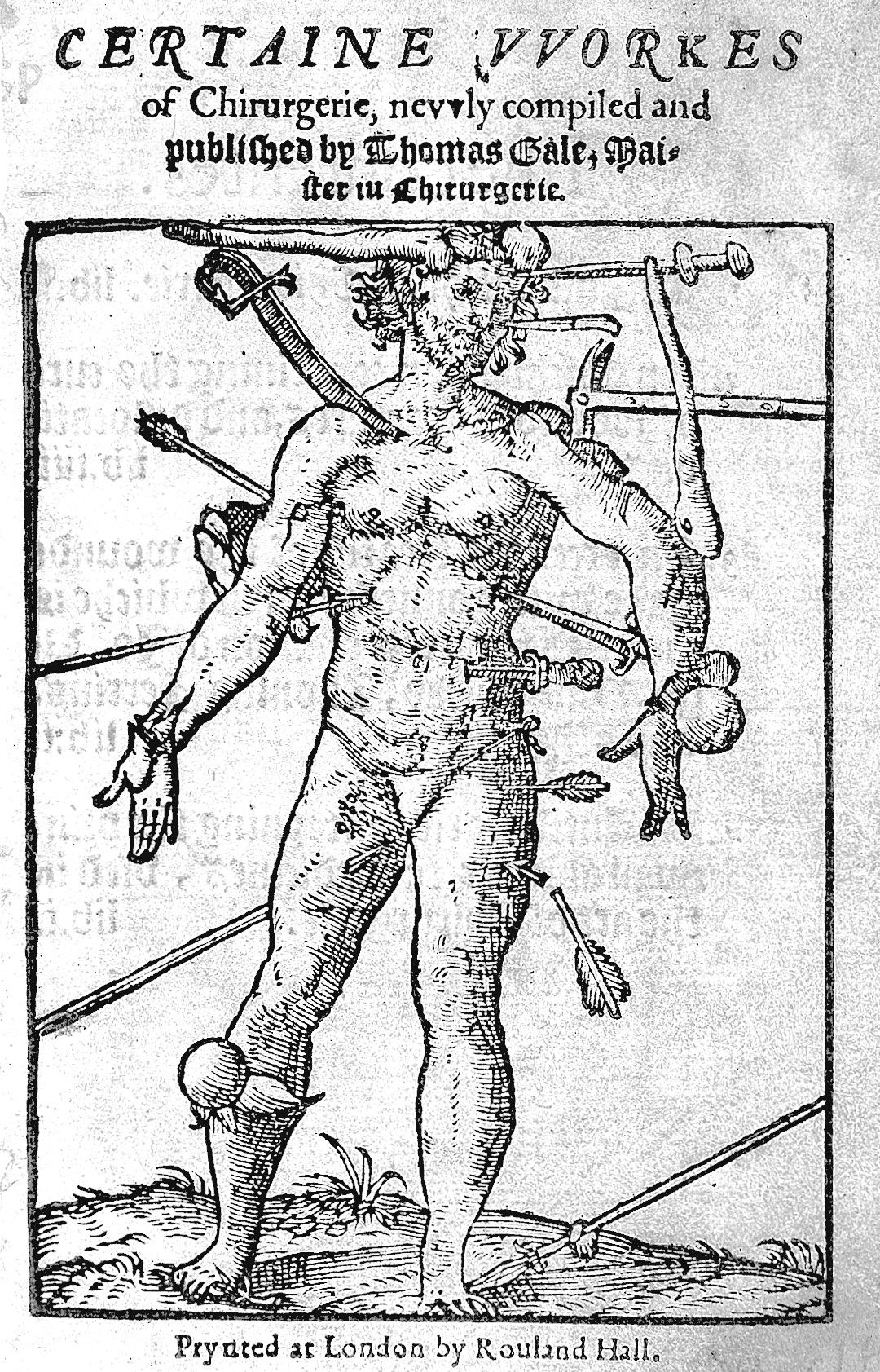
Hill's medical interests are reflected in publishing 'Certaine workes of chirurgerie'.

These works covered a diverse range of subjects, from the New World and medicine to statecraft and theology.

- Medical and Philosophical Works
  - Certaine vvorkes of chirurgerie (1562), reflecting his interest in medicine.
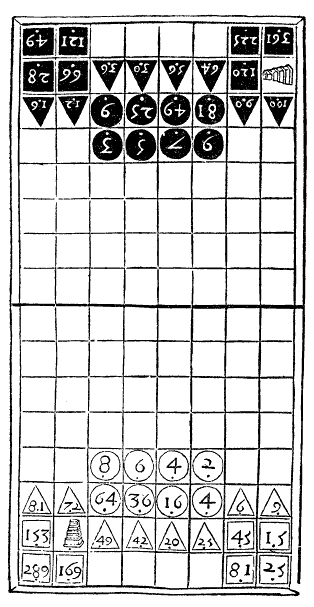
  - Hill was the publisher of a number of esoteric books, including one on Rithmomachia, or the Philosopher's Game.
    The most ancient and learned Playe, called the Philosopher's Game (1562), a book on the philosophical game Rithmomachia, dedicated to Robert Dudley, 1st Earl of Leicester.
- Theological and Classical Texts
  - The Boke of Psalmes,(1559)
  - Treatise on Relics by John Calvin (1561)
  - A translation of Virgil's Aeneid (1562) Translated by Thomas Phaer. (1562) printed with 'Nicholas England'
  - Godlie meditations upon the Lordes prayer(1562)
- Historical and Political Writings
  - The Whole and True Discovery of Terra Florida (1563).
  - The Lawes and Statutes of Geneva (1562)
  - A Declaration Made by the Prynce of Conde. (1662) This book was printed for Edward Sutton, 4th Baron Dudley
  - To His Brother Quintus The Proconsull or Deputy of Asia, Wherein the Office of a Magistrate is Conningly and Wisely Described. (1561)
  - The John Shute translation of the works of Andrea Cambini and Paolo Giovio into English and a tract on them Two very notable commentaries: The one of the original of the Turcks and the empire of the house of Ottomanno, and the other of the warre of the Turcke against George Scanderbeg (1562)
  - The history of Leonard Aretine

Some of the books linked to Hill's publishing activities carried a badge of a half eagle and a key, a device that also appears on the front page of the second quarto edition of Shakespeare's A Midsummer Night's Dream.

=== The Soulton Library ===
A theory suggests that Sir Rowland Hill's statecraft involved him accumulating state papers and important texts at his manor, Soulton Hall. This collection is thought to have later passed through the Alkington Cottons and eventually contributed to the Cotton Library, which famously holds manuscripts such Magna Carta. This hypothesis offers a potential explanation for why Soulton Hall was ransacked during the English Civil War.

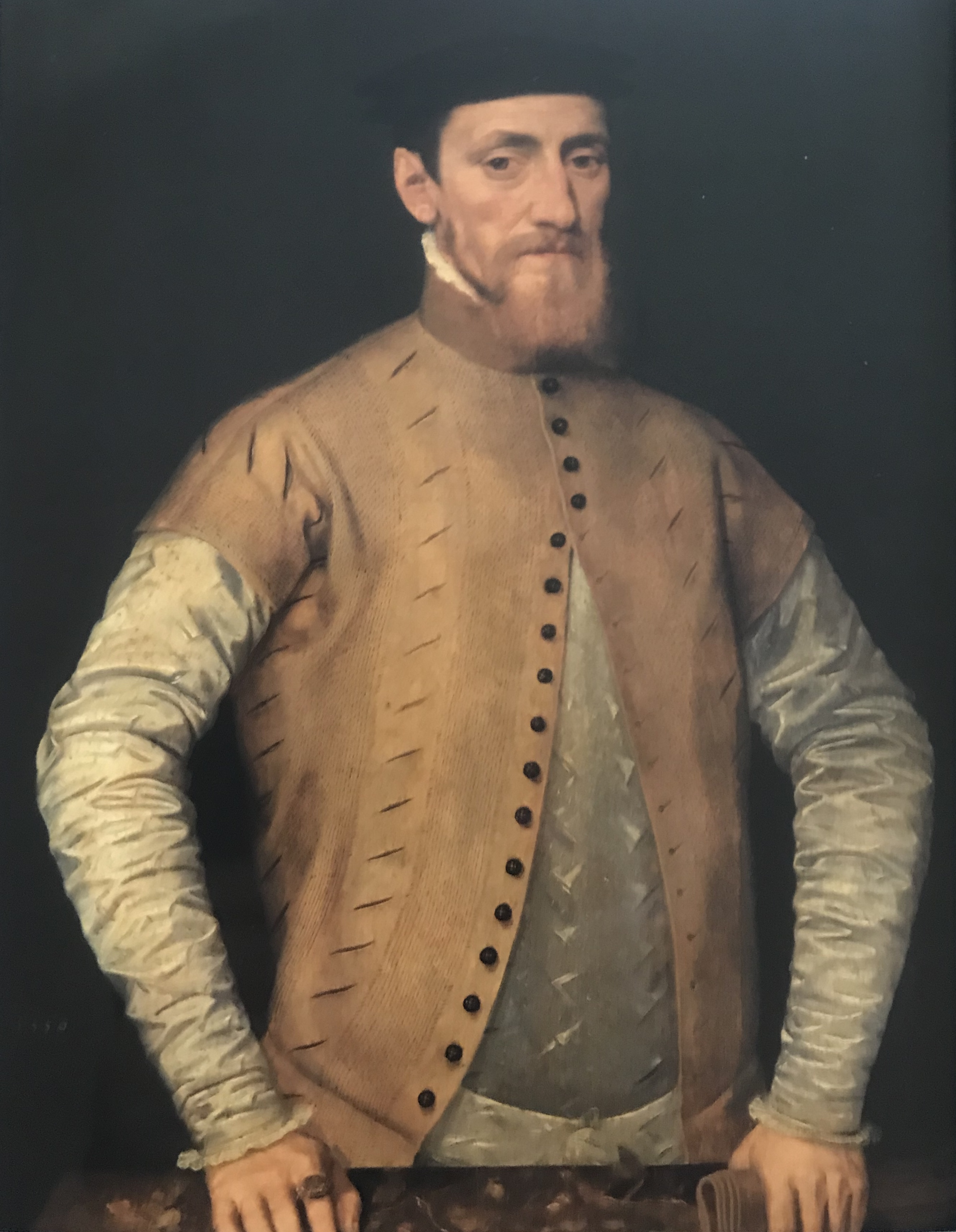
Sir John Gresham, friend of Sir Rowland Hill

== Association with early theatre and performance ==
As Lord Mayor of London, Sir Rowland Hill was noted in contemporary records for relaxing the regulation of theatre in the city.

He was also involved, alongside his friend Sir John Gresham, in the revival of the Marching Watch or Midsummer Watche, a series of grand public pageants in which thousands of citizens paraded through London. These parades were so spectacular that King Henry VIII and Queen Jane Seymour reportedly watched one from Mercers' Hall.

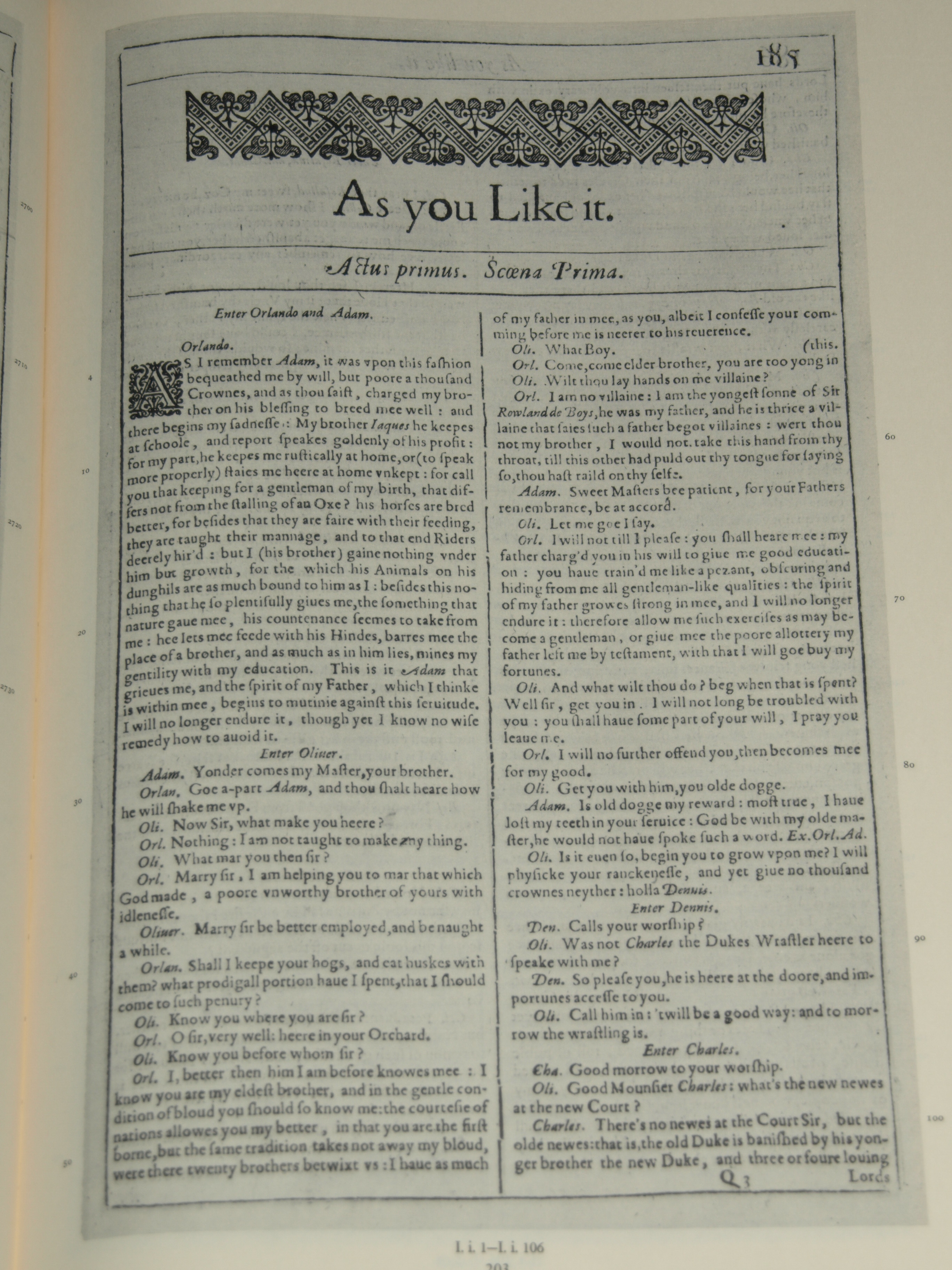
Sir Rowland Hill is linked by some to As You Like It.

Hill's links to the literary world, particularly to William Shakespeare, are a subject of scholarly interest, for example:

- he was a cousin by marriage to Mary Arden, Shakespeare's mother.
- he was a friend and bought the manor of Soulton of Sir Thomas Lodge, whose son Thomas Lodge Jr's prose tale Rosalynde was the source for Shakespeare's play As You Like It.
- It has been speculated that Hill himself was the inspiration for the character Rowland de Bois in As You Like It and his house at Soulton was conceived of as a theatre.

== Memorials and reputation ==
A contemporary said of Sir Rowland:

"Wheresoever a good dede was to be done for the common weal of his countrymen, he was ready to further the cause."

Thomas Fuller recorded that on his death he "Forg[ave] his Tenants a years Rent. Also enjoyning his Heirs, to make them new Leases of one and twenty years, for two years Rent" and concluded of him:

I have heard the natives of this County confess and complain of a comparative dearth (in proportion to other Shires) of Benefactors to the publick. But sure, Shropshire is like to the Mulberry, which putteth forth his leaves last of all Trees, but then maketh such speed, (as sensible of his slowness with an ingenious shame) that it over∣taketh those trees in Fruit, which in Leaves started long before it. As this Shire of late hath done affording two of the same surname still surviving, who have dipp'd their hands so deep in charitable morter.

Hill's charity had a stern edge, with the epitaph on his monument stating that he also enjoyed a reputation as 'a foe to vice and a vehement corrector',

A friend to virtue, a lover of learning,

A foe to vice and vehement corrector, A prudent person, all truth supporting,

A citizen sage, and worthy counsellor, A love of wisdom, of justice a furtherer, Lo here his corps lieth, Sir Rowland Hill by name,

Of London late Lord Mayor and Alderman of same.

Archer credits Sir Rowland Hill among a series of mid-century Lord Mayors who were "stern moralists," Hill's credentials as an "anti-corruption campaigner" themes which were noted in the 2021 North Shropshire by-election, on account of his manor being used extensively during that campaign.

He died 28 October 1561 of strangury, according to the diary of Henry Machyn, and was buried at St Stephen Walbrook on 5 November.

Sir Thomas Offley was among the leading mourners at the funeral.

A more than life size statue is erected in the church with Hill holding Magna Carta, a document signed for King John (negotiated by a forebear of Sir Rowland as Lord Mayor, Serlo the Mercer, third Lord Mayor of London).

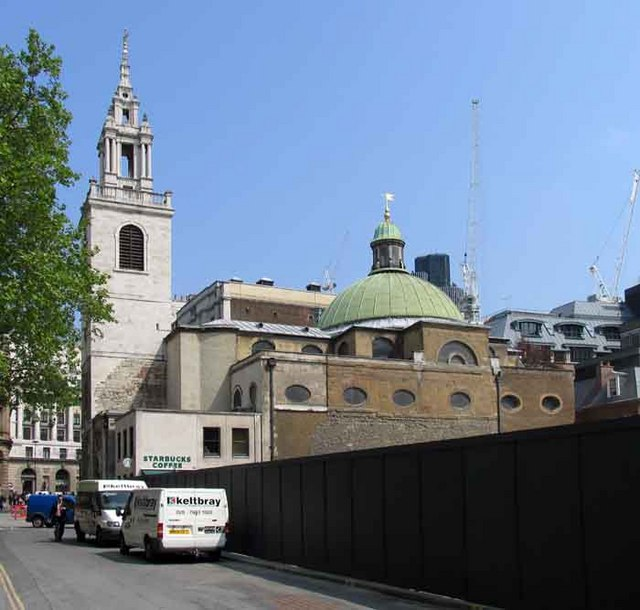
St Stephen Walbrook, London, burial place of Sir Rowland Hill

A contemporary account of his funeral was as follows:

The v day of November was bered in sant Stephen's in Walbroke ser Rowland Hylle, latt mare and altherman and mercer and knyght, with a standard and v pennons of armes, and a cott armur and a helmet, a crest, sword, and mantyll, and xj dosen of skochyons of armes; and he gayff a c. gownes and cottes to men and women; and ther wher ij haroldes of armes, master Clarenshux and master Somersett, and my lord mayre morner, the cheyff morner; ser Recherd Lee, master Corbett, with dyvers odur morners, ser Wylliam Cordell, ser Thomas Offeley, ser Martens Bowes and master Chamburlan althermen, and the ij shreyffes, and master Chambur . . and master Blakewell, with mony mo morners, and a 1. pore men in good blake gownes, besyd women; and the dene of Powlles mad the sermon; and after all done my lord mayre and mony and althermen whent to the Mercers' hall and the craft to dener, and the resedu to ys plase to dener, and grett mon mad for ys deth, and he gayff myche to the pore.

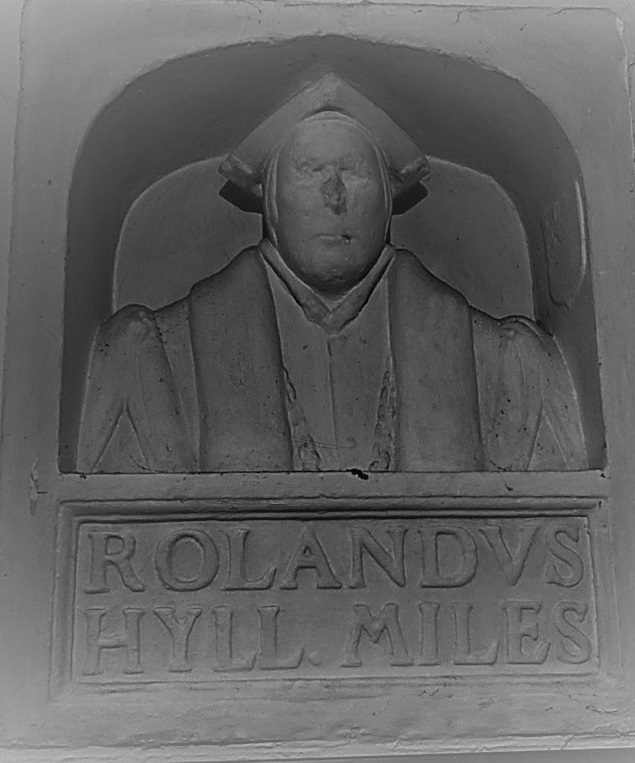
Sir Rowland Hill's bust in the C16th school building at Market Drayton. (Now a private residence).

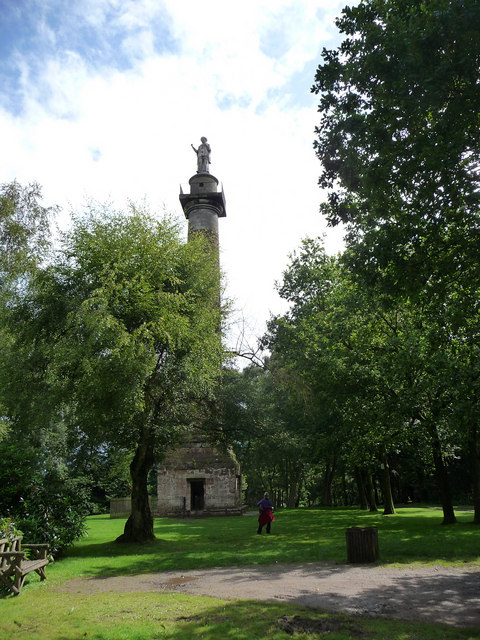
The Hawkstone Hill Monument depicts Sir Rowland looking at Soulton holding a copy of Magna Carta.

There is a sixteenth-century bust of him in the building occupied by the school he founded in Market Drayton.

There is a statue of Hill on a pillar at Hawkstone Park in Shropshire. This monument, known as "The Obelisk" is on a column of 110 feet, and was :

a copy from an ancient monument, which before the Great Fire of London stood in the Church of St Stephen, Walbrook.

The text originally on the Hawkstone pillar read as follows:

THE RIGHTEOUS SHALL BE HAD IN EVERLASTING REMEMBRANCE.-Psalm cxi. 6.

The first stone of this Pillar was laid by Sir Richard Hill, Bart. Member in several Parliaments for this County, on the 1st day of October, in the year 1795; who caused it to be erected, not only for the various uses of an Observatory, and to feast the eye, by presenting to it at one view, a most luxuriant and ex-tensive prospect, which takes in not less than twelve (or, as some assert, fifteen) counties; but from mo-tives of justice, respect, and gratitude to the memory of a truly great and good man, viz. Sir Rowland Hill, Knt. who was born at the family mansion of Hawkstone, in the reign of King Henry the Seventh, and being bred to trade, and free of the city of London, became one of the most considerable and opulent merchants of his time, and was Lord Mayor of the same, in the second and third years of Edward the Sixth, anno 1549 and 1550, and was the first Protestant who filled that high office. Having embraced the principles of the Reformation, he zealously exerted himself in behalf of the Protestant cause, and having been diligent in the use of all religious exercises, prayerful, conscientious, and watchful (as a writer of his character expresses it), yet trusting only in the merits of our Lord and Saviour, Jesus Christ, he exchanged his life for a better, a short while after the death of that pious young monarch, being aged nearly seventy years. For a considerable time previous to his decease, he gave up his mercantile occupations, that he might with more devotedness of heart attend to the great concerns of another world. His lands, possessions, and church patronage, were im-mense; particularly in the counties of Salop and Chester; the number of his tenants (none of whom he ever raised or fined) amounting to one thousand one hundred and eighty-one, as appears from his own handwriting. But his private virtues, good deeds, and munificent spirit, were quite unlimited, and extended-like the prospect before us, East, West, North, and South, far surpassing all bounds. "Being sensible," saith Fuller (speaking of him in his "Worthies of England"), "that "his great estate was given him of God," it was his desire to devote it to his glory. He built a spacious church in his own parish of Hodnet, and likewise the neighbouring church of Stoke, at his own expense. He built Tern and Atcham Bridges in this county, both of hewn stone, and containing several arches each. He also built other large bridges of timber. He built and endowed several Free Schools, particularly that of Drayton. He made and paved divers highways for the public utility. He founded exhibitions, and educated many students at both Universities, and supported at the Inns of Court others who were brought up to the Law. He was the unwearied friend of the widow and the fatherless. He clothed annually three hundred poor people in his own neighbourhood, both with shirts and coats; and in the city of London he gave £500 (an immense sum in those days) to St. Bartholomew's hospital, besides (saith Fuller) £600 to Christ Church hospital. He also gave most liberally to all other hospitals, and at his death bequeathed £150 to the poor of all the Wards in London. He had no children, but his relations and kinsfolk were numerous, who all partook largely of his bounty, both in his lifetime and at his death. He constantly kept up a great family household, where hi maintained good hospitality. Many resorted to him for his wise and salutary advice; and none who came to him were ever sent empty or dissatisfied away.

Go and do thou likewise, as far as thy ability will permit, without injury to thy own relations.

To suffer such a character to sink into oblivion, would be in the highest degree ungrateful, as well as injurious to posterity, for whose imitation it is held up.

The identity of Hill's wife, whom he had married by 1542, is unknown. She died during the year of his mayoralty, and since there were no children of the marriage, his heir was his brother, William, parson of Stoke on Tern; however he left property to the children of his four sisters:

- Agnes Hill, who married John Cowper, esquire.
- Joan Hill, who married George Dormayne, esquire.
- Jane Hill, who married John Gratewood (died 8 August 1570), esquire, of Wollerton, Shropshire, the son of William Gratwood by Mary Newport, daughter of Thomas Newport of High Ercall, Shropshire, by whom she had a son, William Gratwood, who married Mary Newport, the daughter of Sir Richard Newport (died 1570) of High Ercall; Alice Gratewood (died 1603), who married the justice Reginald Corbet; and Margaret Gratwood, who married Thomas Jones (born 1550) of Chilton.
- Elizabeth Hill, who married John Barker of Haughmond in Shropshire, esquire.

Another of his heiresses being Alice Barker alias Coverdale wife of Sir Thomas Leigh (who had been Hill's business junior and was also Lord Mayor of London), descendents of whom are Dukes of Marlborough, Viscount Melbourne (the Premier) and later Dukes of Leeds. Hill has a new grant of arms issued to him, despite his family having an ancient right to arms which as, and these arms were specially granted to his hiers who were not issue of his body. The new arms specially created for him have a noticeable likenes to the arms of the Adren family, but the new arms repeated the castle device used on the arms of the family from at least the reign of Richard II.

Within All Souls, Oxford University the arms of Hill (or his heirs) appear in the colonnade of the Great Quadrangle, opposite the arms of the Boyle family.

== Portraits ==
There are 16th-century portraits of Hill in the Museum of London and in the Mercers' Hall in Ironmongers' Lane, as well as at Attingham Park and Tatton Park. The last of these was exhibited in 1897 at Manchester City Art Gallery in a show called "The royal house of Tudor".

These portraits contain inscriptions in both French and Latin. The French text at the top:

ADIEU MONDE PUIS QUE TV DESCORS TOUT INFAMS…TOUT CHASTES TOUT A LA FIN ORLIVES TOUT,

can be translated as:

Farewell world, since you deceive all, dishonour all, punish all, in the end make all fall into oblivion.

The Latin inscription below describes him as a "good and wise man" who was a former Lord Mayor of London. It details how he prospered under Kings Henry VIII and Edward VI, acquiring his wealth with a clear conscience. As he aged, he gave up the pursuit of riches and lived a quiet, content life. The text highlights his generosity, noting that he liberally gave to the poor, supported scholars, and helped lawyers. As he had no children, he divided his possessions among his relatives. The inscription concludes that his piety was so great that his fame spread far and wide, and he dedicated his later life to prayer and contemplation for the glory of God.

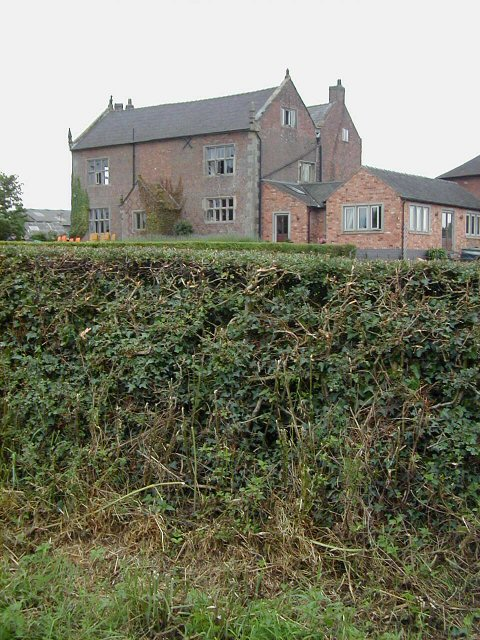
Alkington Hall, Shropshire, a Cotton family seat

== Land holdings and connections to the Cotton family ==
Following the Dissolution of the Monasteries, Sir Rowland Hill acquired numerous properties, including St Chad's Church in Norton-in-Hales. This land was later passed to the Cotton family, originally from Alkington.

illiam Cotton, a London draper, served as Hill's agent in Shropshire and this connection proved instrumental in the Cotton family's social rise.

A later family member, Sir Allan Cotton, became Lord Mayor of London in 1625–1626, and Sir Robert Cotton founded the Cotton Library, which was eventually acquired by the British Museum.

== Connections to Notable Figures ==
Hill's legacy is also linked to several prominent families.

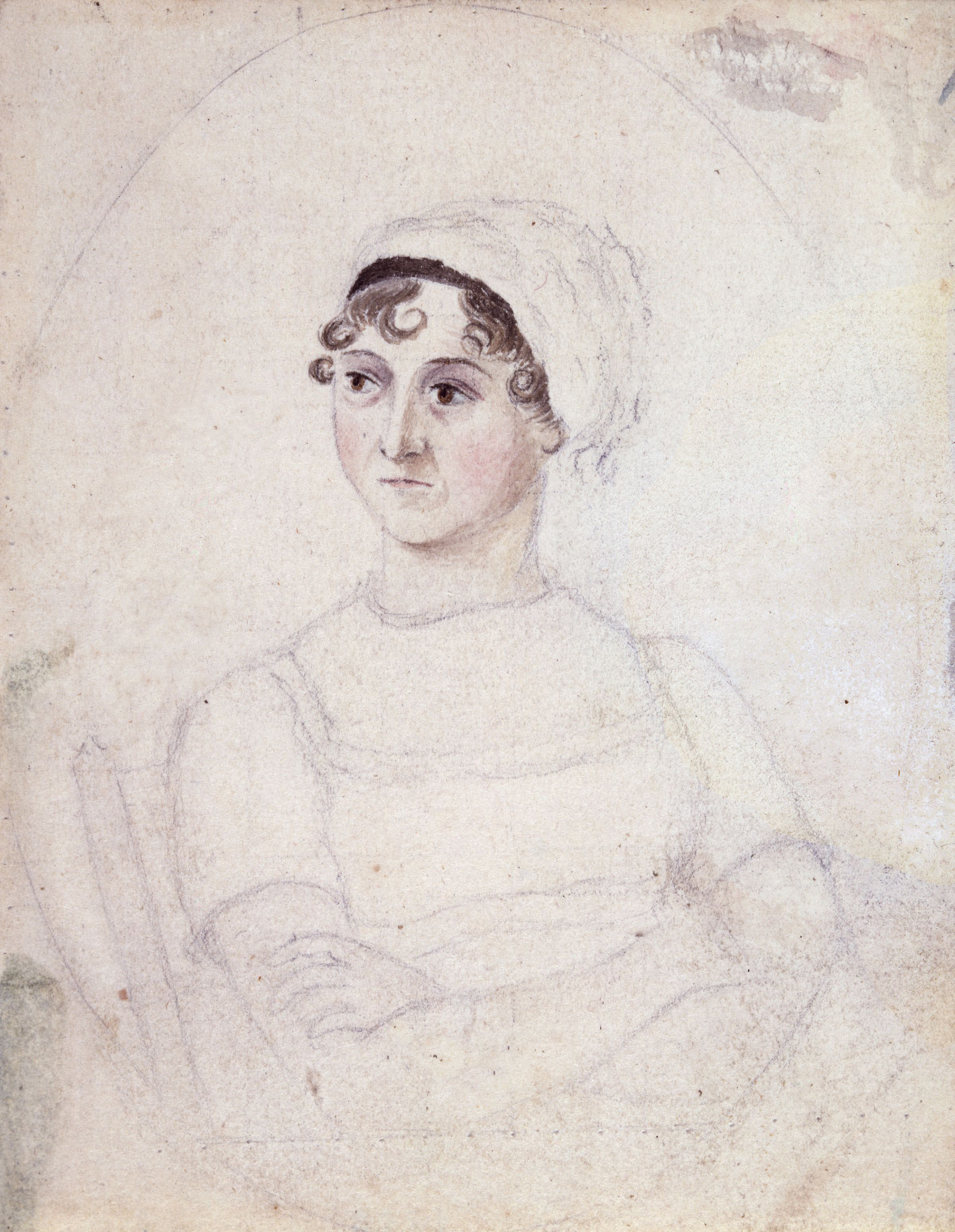
The writer Jane Austen descends from the union of 'Old Sir Rowland’s' heiresses with his protégés

The writer Jane Austen is related to Hill via one of his heiresses, Alice Barker and his protégé Sir Thomas Leigh of Stoneleigh.

In this same line is Catherine Leigh, wife of the Gunpowder Plot conspirator Robert Catesby.

Hill's great-niece and heiress, Elizabeth Corbet, married in 1573 Robert Arden (1553–1635) of Park Hall, Warwickshire. The only son of Catholic martyr Edward Arden, Sheriff of Warwickshire (for 1575/76) and a descendant of the ancient Arden family, Robert's second cousin was Mary née Arden, mother of William Shakespeare.

Through his cousin Sir Thomas Bromley, the Tudor Lord Chancellor, Hill was related to Sir Oliver Cromwell, uncle of the Lord Protector.

== Charities ==
Sir Rowland Hill's Educational Foundation, named in his memory, continues its charitable giving to this day.
