= Harry Dean =

Harry Dean may refer to:

- Harry Dean (cricketer) (1884–1957), English cricketer
- Harry Dean (musician) (1879–1955), Canadian conductor, pianist, organist, and music educator
- Harry Dean (baseball) (1915–1960), American Major League pitcher
- Harry Dean (politician) (1913–1997), Queensland politician
- Harry Dean Stanton (1926–2017), American actor, musician and singer
- Harry Dean (footballer) (2007–), Australian rules footballer for Carlton

== See also ==
- Harry Deane (1846–1925), American baseball player in the National Association
- Henry Dean (disambiguation)
- Henry Deane (disambiguation)
