= Thomas Cambell =

English merchant

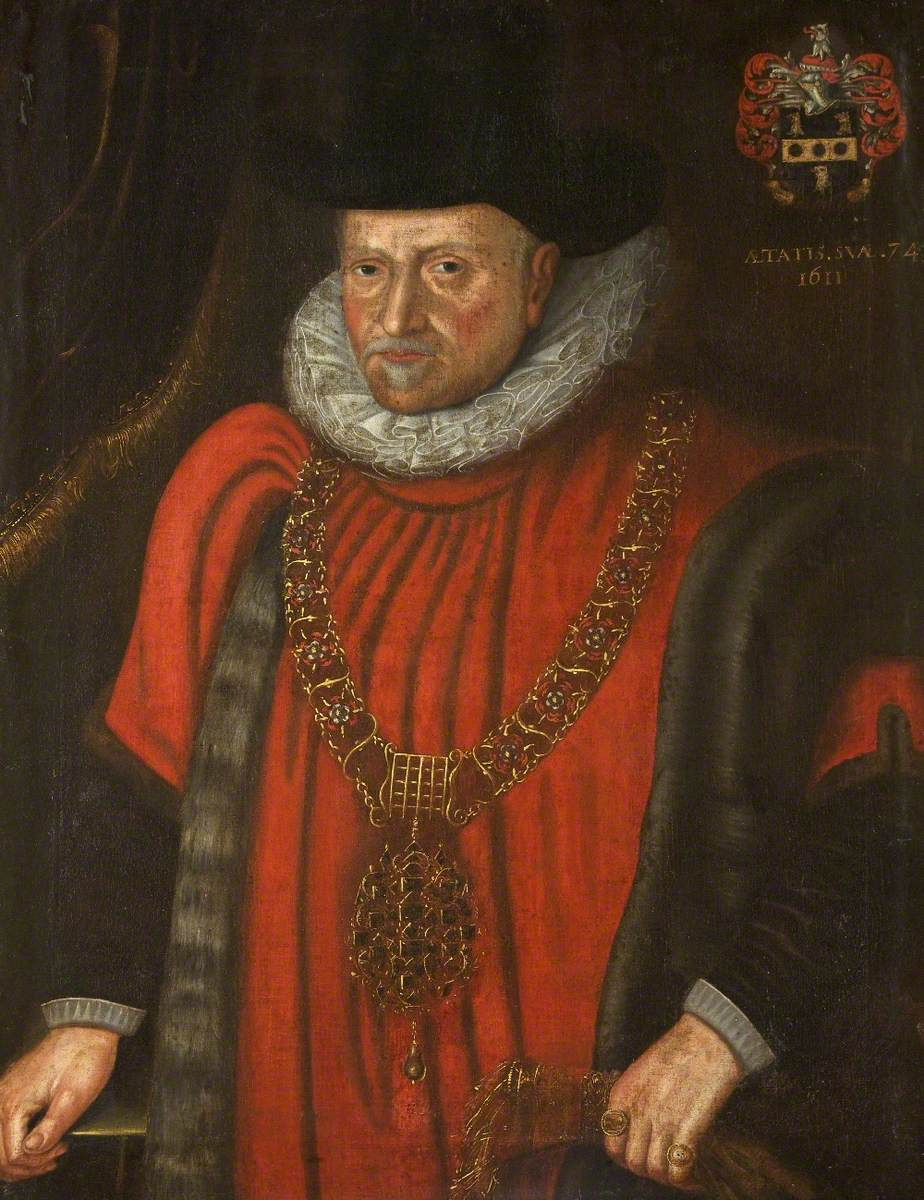
- Sir Thomas Cambell, Lord Mayor of London in 1609

Lord Mayor of the City of London
- In office 1609
- Preceded by: Humphrey Weld
- Succeeded by: William Craven

Personal details
- Born: 1536
- Died: 13 February 1614 (aged 77–78)
- Spouse: Alice Bugle
- Children: 10, including James Cambell

Sir Thomas Cambell (c. 1536 – 13 February 1614) was an English merchant who was Lord Mayor of London in 1609.

== Life ==
Cambell was a city of London merchant and a member of the Worshipful Company of Ironmongers. He was auditor for the city from 1584 to 1586, from 1588 to 1590 and from 1596 to 1598 and member of the committee of the East India Company from 1599 to 1600. On 14 November 1599 he was elected an alderman of the City of London for Bridge Without ward and elected Sheriff of London for 1602. In 1601 he became a member of the committee of the East India Company again until 1607 and was governor of the East India Company for 1603 and 1604. He was knighted on 26 July 1603. In 1604 he was Master of the Ironmongers Company. In 1609, he was elected Lord Mayor of London, and organised a pageant for Henry Frederick, Prince of Wales on the Thames called London's Love to Prince Henry.

He became alderman for Bread Street in 1610 and for Coleman Street in 1611. In 1613 he was Master of the Ironmongers Company again.

== Family ==
Cambell married Alice Bugle, daughter of Edward Bugle, merchant of London. He was the father of James Cambell Lord Mayor in 1629 and Robert Cambell who was father of two baronets. His daughters married John Gore, Christopher Clitherow and Anthony Abdy.

Civic offices
Preceded by Humphrey Weld	Lord Mayor of the City of London; 1609	Succeeded by William Craven
