= Charles Dean =

Charles or Charlie Dean may refer to:

- Charles Dean (died 1974), American man kidnapped and killed in Laos
- Charles Dean (politician) (1939–2026), American politician from Florida
- Charles Dean (baseball), American Negro league baseball player
- Charlie Dean (footballer) (born 2001), Australian footballer
- Charlie Dean, a fictional character on Hollyoaks

== See also ==
- Charlie Dean (Charlotte Ellen Dean, born 2000), English cricketer
- Charles Deane (disambiguation)
