= Jack Dean =

Jack Dean may refer to:

- Jack Dean (American football), American football player and coach
- Jack Dean (actor) (1875–1950), American actor

== See also ==
- John Dean (disambiguation)
- Jack Dean Kingsbury (born 1934), American professor of theology
