= Cambell (ward) =

Electoral ward in London, England

- Former electoral ward for the Barking and Dagenham London Borough Council
- Borough: Barking and Dagenham
- County: Greater London

Former electoral ward
- Created: 1965
- Abolished: 2002
- Name origin: James Cambell

Cambell was an electoral ward in the London Borough of Barking and Dagenham from 1965 to 2002.

== 1978–2002 Barking and Dagenham council elections ==
There was a revision of ward boundaries in Barking in 1978. The name of the borough and council changed from Barking to Barking and Dagenham on 1 January 1980.

=== 1998 election ===
The election took place on 7 May 1998.

1998 Barking and Dagenham London Borough Council election: Cambell
Party	Candidate	Votes	%	±%
Labour	Joan Rawlinson	1,074	78.8	+4.3
Labour	Jeffrey Porter	1,047		
Labour	June Van Roten	1,041		
Liberal Democrats	Michael Mailey	289	21.2	+5.3
Liberal Democrats	John Kelly	250		
Turnout		1,510	23.4	−13.9
Registered electors		6,459		
Labour hold		Swing		
Labour hold		Swing		
Labour hold		Swing		

=== 1994 election ===
The election took place on 5 May 1994.

1994 Barking and Dagenham London Borough Council election: Cambell
Party	Candidate	Votes	%	±%
Labour	Mabel Arnold	1,896	83.1	−1.8
Labour	Joan Rawlinson	1,839		
Labour	June van Roten	1,742		
Liberal Democrats	Heather Boorman	385	16.9	N/A
Liberal Democrats	David Boorman	369		
Liberal Democrats	Elizabeth Durrant	322		
Turnout		2,561	38.3	+1.5
Registered electors		6,683		
Labour hold		Swing		
Labour hold		Swing		
Labour hold		Swing		

=== 1990 election ===
The election took place on 3 May 1990.

1990 Barking and Dagenham London Borough Council election: Cambell
Party	Candidate	Votes	%	±%
Labour	Mable Arnold	2,024	85.9	+5.7
Labour	Wendola Bomberg	1,853		
Labour	Ronald Whitbread	1,842		
Conservative	Charles Bond	361	14.1	−5.7
Conservative	David Izzard	263		
Rejected ballots		11	0.4	N/A
Turnout		2,558	36.8	+5.2
Registered electors		6,958		
Labour hold		Swing		
Labour hold		Swing		
Labour hold		Swing		

=== 1986 election ===
The election took place on 8 May 1986.

1986 Barking and Dagenham London Borough Council election: Cambell
Party	Candidate	Votes	%	±%
Labour	Joseph Butler	1,559	80.2	+11.8
Labour	Marjorie Creasy	1,422		
Labour	Mabel Arnold	1,352		
Conservative	Charles Bond	385	19.8	−11.8
Conservative	Trevor Wade	336		
Turnout			31.6	−0.3
Registered electors		7,120		
Labour hold		Swing		
Labour hold		Swing		
Labour hold		Swing		

=== 1982 election ===
The election took place on 6 May 1982.

1982 Barking and Dagenham London Borough Council election: Cambell
Party	Candidate	Votes	%	±%
Labour	Joseph Butler	1,365	68.4	+5.0
Labour	Sidney Cole	1,220		
Labour	Marjorie Creasey	1,179		
Conservative	Ronald Smith	630	31.6	+9.5
Conservative	Stella Seaman	604		
Conservative	Phyllis Turner	544		
Turnout			31.9	+0.0
Registered electors		7,135		
Labour hold		Swing		
Labour hold		Swing		
Labour hold		Swing		

=== 1979 by-election ===
The by election took place on 29 March 1979, following the death of Bertie Roycraft.

1979 Cambell by-election
Party	Candidate	Votes	%	±%
Labour	Eric Harris	1,019	48.4	−15.0
Conservative	Brian Cook	906	43.0	+20.9
National Front	John Benjafield	106	5.0	N/A
Liberal	Daniel Felton	76	3.6	−5.9
Majority		113	5.4	N/A
Turnout			28.7	−3.2
Registered electors		7,354		
Labour hold		Swing		

=== 1978 election ===
The election took place on 4 May 1978.

1978 Barking London Borough Council election: Cambell
Party	Candidate	Votes	%	±%
Labour	Joseph Butler	1,552	63.4	−26.8
Labour	Sidney Cole	1,481		N/A
Labour	Bertie Roycraft	1,295		N/A
Conservative	Dorothea Reed	542	22.1	+12.3
Liberal	Robert Porter	233	9.5	N/A
Communist	Danielle Nicholls	121	4.9	N/A
Turnout			31.9	+11.0
Registered electors		7,386		
Labour win (new boundaries)				
Labour win (new boundaries)				
Labour win (new boundaries)				

== 1964–1978 Barking council elections ==
External image
- Cambell ward boundaries from 1965 to 1978

=== 1974 election ===
The election took place on 2 May 1974.

1974 Barking London Borough Council election: Cambell
Party	Candidate	Votes	%	±%
Labour	Joseph Butler	1,884	90.2	−2.8
Labour	Sidney Cole	1,877		N/A
Labour	D Jones	1,788		N/A
Labour	James Jones	1,679		N/A
Conservative	B Williamson	205	9.8	+2.8
Turnout			20.9	−6.4
Registered electors		8,849		
Labour hold		Swing		
Labour hold		Swing		
Labour hold		Swing		
Labour hold		Swing		

=== 1971 election ===
The election took place on 13 May 1971.

1971 Barking London Borough Council election: Cambell
Party	Candidate	Votes	%	±%
Labour	Joseph Butler	2,594	93.0	+14.9
Labour	Sidney Cole	2,501		N/A
Labour	D Jones	2,494		N/A
Labour	James Jones	2,426		N/A
Conservative	D Reed	194	7.0	−14.9
Turnout			27.3	+6.1
Registered electors		9,364		
Labour hold		Swing		
Labour hold		Swing		
Labour hold		Swing		
Labour hold		Swing		

=== 1968 election ===
The election took place on 9 May 1968.

1968 Barking London Borough Council election: Cambell
Party	Candidate	Votes	%	±%
Labour	Joseph Butler	1,465	78.1	−14.1
Labour	Sidney Cole	1,342		N/A
Labour	D Jones	1,330		N/A
Labour	James Jones	1,293		N/A
Conservative	B Fuller	411	21.9	+14.1
Conservative	J Kelly	377		N/A
Conservative	L Ouzmann	377		N/A
Conservative	D Tanner	376		N/A
Turnout			21.2	−2.3
Registered electors		8,775		
Labour hold		Swing		
Labour hold		Swing		
Labour hold		Swing		
Labour hold		Swing		

=== 1964 election ===
The election took place on 7 May 1964.

1964 Barking London Borough Council election: Cambell
Party	Candidate	Votes	%	±%
Labour	J Sweetland	2,007	92.2	N/A
Labour	B Roycraft	2,003		N/A
Labour	Sidney Cole	1,986		N/A
Labour	Joseph Butler	1,963		N/A
Conservative	B Woodcock	169	7.8	N/A
Turnout		2,161	23.5	N/A
Registered electors		9,212		
Labour win (new seat)				
Labour win (new seat)				
Labour win (new seat)				
Labour win (new seat)				
