= Richard Deane =

Richard Deane may refer to:

- Richard Deane (bishop) (died 1576), Bishop of Ossory
- Richard Deane (Lord Mayor) (died 1635), English merchant who was Lord Mayor of London in 1628
- Richard Deane (priest), Irish Anglican priest
- Richard Deane (regicide) (1610–1653), English General at Sea, major-general and regicide

== See also ==
- Richard Dean (disambiguation)
