= Alkington, Shropshire =

Hamlet in Shropshire, England

Coordinates: 52.948°N 2.699°W

Alkington
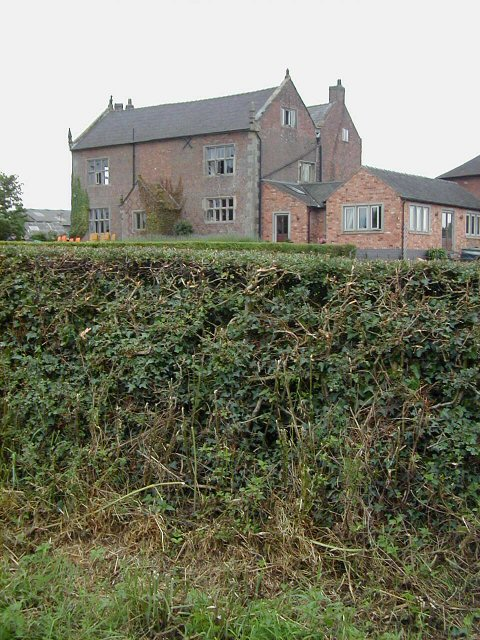
- Alkington Hall

- Location within Shropshire
- OS grid reference: SJ530392
- Civil parish: Whitchurch Rural
- Unitary authority: Shropshire
- Ceremonial county: Shropshire
- Region: West Midlands
- Country: England
- Sovereign state: United Kingdom
- Post town: WHITCHURCH
- Postcode district: SY13
- Dialling code: 01948
- Police: West Mercia
- Fire: Shropshire
- Ambulance: West Midlands
- UK Parliament: North Shropshire

Alkington is a hamlet in Shropshire, England, near Whitchurch and south of that town. The village is on limestone and is residential.

== Alkington Hall ==
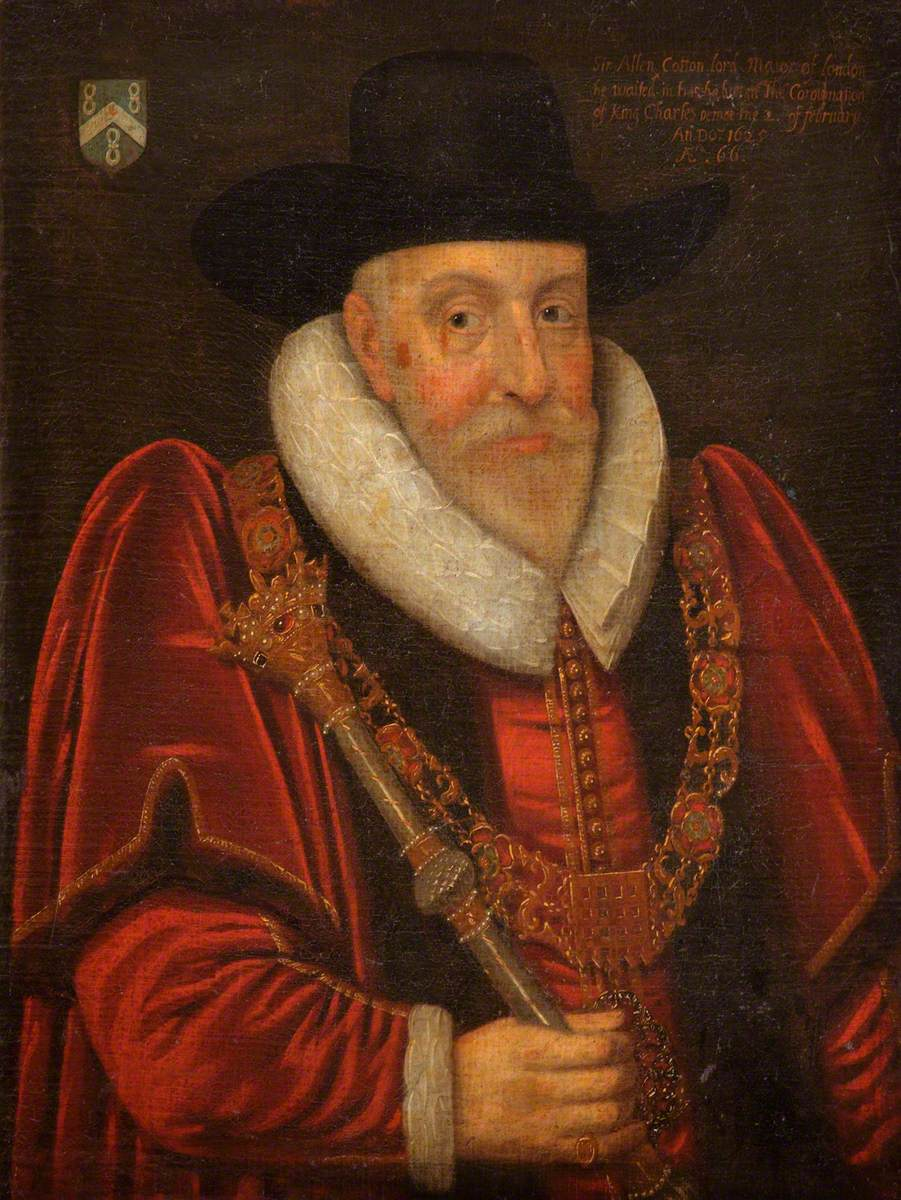
Sir Allan Cotton of Alkington, Lord Mayor of London 1625

Alkington Hall was a late 16th-century country house, now a Grade II* listed farmhouse. It was constructed in two storeys of red brick with grey brick diapering and grey sandstone ashlar dressings and plain tile and slate roofs to an L-shaped floor plan.

It was built in 1592, probably for the London merchant, William Cotton. The Cotton family rose in prominence due to proximity to Sir Rowland Hill, (publisher of the Geneva Bible) whose lands they managed in Shropshire.

The manor was held by the Cotton family from the 16th century, of the line of the Cottons of Alkington was Lord Mayor of London in 1625; Sir Allan Cotton. Rowland Cotton of this family was a favourite of Henry Frederick, Prince of Wales and was an MP for Newcastle-under-Lyme for some years and High Sheriff of Shropshire for 1616. His monument in nearby Norton-in-Hales was designed by Inigo Jones.

Some alterations and improvements were made in the late 19th century. The house was saved from a fire in 2010 when in the ownership of John and Elaine Fearnall.
