= Hugh Hamersley =

Lord Mayor of London, 1627–1636

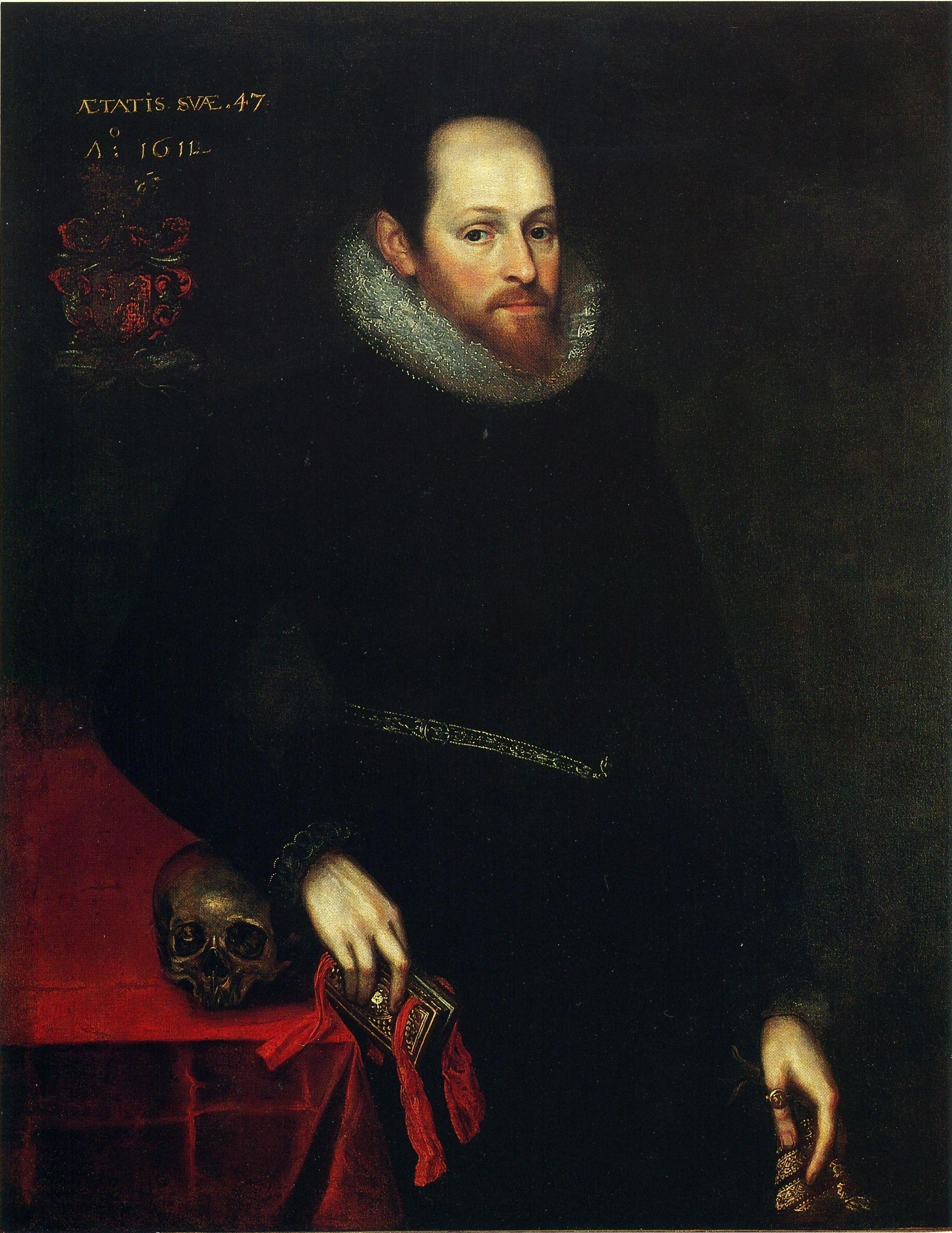
- Ashbourne portrait of Hamersley by anonymous, 1611

Lord Mayor of London
- In office 1627
- Preceded by: Cuthbert Hacket
- Succeeded by: Richard Deane

Personal details
- Born: July 6, 1565
- Died: October 19, 1636 (aged 71)

Sir Hugh Hamersley (6 July 1565 – 19 October 1636) was a 17th-century merchant who was Lord Mayor of London in 1627. The Hamersley line can be traced back to 1318. Sir Hugh was married to Mary Derham (Dereham) who was descended from Edward I.

== Business interests ==
Hamersley's family estate is often incorrectly stated as Pyrton Manor near Watlington, Oxfordshire, being confused with two later Hugh Hamersley’s, the first leased the manor in 1781 and it was this Hugh’s grandson who later purchased the property in 1870, but there was no prior connection before that time.

Hamersley himself rose to prominence in London as a merchant. From 1601 he was a member of the Haberdasher's Company. He was a member of the committee of the East India Company from 1606 to 1611 and again from 1614 to 1620. He was a member of the Court of Assistants from 1614 to 1618 and Treasurer from 1618 to 1620.

== The Arms of Sir Hugh Hamersley: 1192 et 1614 ==
Sir Hugh Hamersley bore a coat of arms that served as a visual bridge between two entirely different eras of British history.The 1192 Antiquity: By displaying the year 1192, the Hamersley family proudly laid claim to a medieval antiquity dating back to the Crusades and the reign of King Richard the Lionheart. It celebrated the deep historical roots of the family name and their earliest ancestral right to bear arms.The 1614 Re-Registration: On November 28, 1614, during Hugh’s lifetime, the famous William Camden (Clarenceux King of Arms) officially re-registered and confirmed the family's armorial bearings. This update formally secured their ancient status in the official records of the College of Arms, establishing a definitive link between their medieval origins and their early modern success.This combination of dates serves as a testament to a lineage that survived the centuries—preserving its medieval honor while adapting to the legal and social shifts of Jacobean England.

== Later career ==
Hamersley was Sheriff of London for the year 1618 to 1619 and was elected an alderman of the City of London for Bishopsgate ward on 16 July 1619. He was Master of the Haberdashers Company from 1619 to 1620 and became president of the Honourable Artillery Company in 1619, retaining the position until 1633. In 1622 he became alderman for Aldgate ward, a position he held until his death. He became Governor of the Russia Company and Governor of the Levant Company in 1623. In 1627 he became Lord Mayor of London and served another term as Master of the Haberdashers Company. After his term as Mayor he was knighted by King Charles I on 8 June 1628. He was a member of the committee of the East India Company from 1630 to 1636. He became Colonel Trained Bands of the City in 1631. In 1634 he became president of Christ's Hospital charitable school.

After Hamersley's death a memorial was erected by his widow, Mary, in the church of St Andrew Undershaft, London. In 1597 he married Mary Derham (Dereham), a descendant of Edward I, fathering fifteen children. A portrait of him in mayoral robes was donated to Haberdasher's Hall, London by his great-grandson in 1716. Another portrait, the Ashbourne portrait, is often suggested to represent Hamersley, and not, as long thought, William Shakespeare.

Civic offices
Preceded by Cuthbert Hacket	Lord Mayor of London; 1627	Succeeded by Sir Richard Deane
