= John Heriot (footballer) =

Australian rules footballer

Personal information
- Born: 6 January 1940
- Original team: Spotswood
- Height: 191 cm (6 ft 3 in)
- Weight: 79 kg (174 lb)

Playing career^{1}
| Years | Club | Games (Goals) |
| 1958–1968 | South Melbourne | 153 (39) |
- ^{1} Playing statistics correct to the end of 1968.

John Heriot (born 6 January 1940) is a former Australian rules footballer who played with South Melbourne in the VFL during the 1960s.

Heriot played as a fullback although he was sometimes pushed into the forwardline. Of skinny build, he was named in the fullback position in South Melbourne's official "Team of Century". He typically played in short-sleeve jumpers (a compromise between the traditional sleeveless jumper and the alternatives that have long sleeves). He later coached VFA Division 2 side Yarraville.
