= John Dean (disambiguation) =

John Dean (born 1938) was U.S. White House Counsel to President Nixon.

John Dean may also refer to:

Ordered chronologically

- John Dean (convict) (c. 1620–1629), youngest person executed in the history of England
- John Dean (Massachusetts politician), representative to the Great and General Court
- Sgt. John Dean (1755–1817), American Revolutionary War militia officer, one of the three men who caught British spy Major John André
- John Dean (Pennsylvania judge) (1835–1905), Pennsylvania Supreme Court justice from 1892 to 1905
- John M. Dean (1852–1909), Texas state senator - see Texas Senate, District 25
- John Wooster Dean (1874–1950), American actor better known as Jack Dean
- John Dean (tenor) (1897–1990), English singer and actor
- John Gunther Dean (1926–2019), American diplomat
- John Dean (cyclist) (born 1947), New Zealand Olympic cyclist
- John Dean (footballer) (born 1956), Australian rules footballer
- John F. Dean (born 1946), U.S. Tax Court judge
- Johnny Dean (born 1971), British musician

== See also ==
- John Dean Provincial Park, Canada
- Sean O'Mahony (journalist) (1932–2020), British music writer and magazine editor, who wrote under the pen name Johnny Dean
- John Deane (disambiguation)
- Jonathan Dean House, historic house in Massachusetts
