= John Gore (Lord Mayor) =

English merchant

Sir John Gore (died December 1636) was an English merchant who was Lord Mayor of London in 1624.

Gore was a son of Gerard Gore, alderman of the City of London. He was a city of London merchant and a member of the Worshipful Company of Merchant Taylors. He was elected Sheriff of London in 1614 but did not take office until 1615. On 19 December 1615 he was elected an alderman of the City of London for Aldersgate ward. He became instead alderman for Castle Baynard in 1618 and for Walbrook in 1621. In 1624, he was elected Lord Mayor of London. He was knighted on 4 June 1626. In 1634 he was elected president of Christ's Hospital.

Gore married as his second wife, a daughter of Sir Thomas Cambell (Lord Mayor in 1609–10). His eldest daughter married John Cotton, alderman in 1649. He was the brother of Richard Gore MP for the City of London, and of William Gore, alderman and Sheriff in 1615/16.

Civic offices
Preceded by Sir Martin Lumley	Lord Mayor of the City of London; 1624	Succeeded by Allan Cotton
