= Rithmomachia =

Mathematical board game

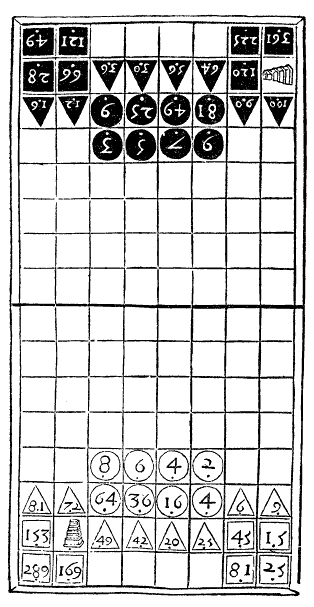
1554 illustration of a Rithmomachy board and pieces by Claude de Boissière

Rithmomachia (also known as rithmomachy, arithmomachia, rythmomachy, rhythmomachy, the philosophers' game, and other variants) is an early European mathematical board game. Its earliest known description dates from the eleventh century. The name comes loosely from Greek and means "The Battle of the Numbers." (Note: The first word is a combination of αριθμός, arithmós, number, and ρυθμός, rythmós, rhythm; the second word is μάχια, máchia, battles. So a literal translation might be "Number-Rhythm Battles".) The game is somewhat like chess except that most methods of capture depend on the numbers inscribed on each piece.

The game was used as an educational tool that teachers could introduce while teaching arithmetic as part of the quadrivium to those in Western Europe who received a classical education during the medieval period. David Sepkoski wrote that between the twelfth and sixteenth centuries, "rithmomachia served as a practical exemplar for teaching the contemplative values of Boethian mathematical philosophy, which emphasized the natural harmony and perfection of number and proportion, that it was used both as a mnemonic drill for the study of Boethian number theory and, more importantly, as a vehicle for moral education, by reminding players of the mathematical harmony of creation." The game declined sharply in popularity in the 17th century, as it was no longer used in education, and potential players were not introduced to it during their schooling.

== History ==
The play he can of Ryghtmadhye
Which dulle wittits dothe encombre
For thys play stant al by noumbre
And hath al his conclusions
Chefly in proporsions
By so sotil ordynaunce
As hyt ys in remembraunce
By thise Philosophurs olde.

— John Lydgate, Reson & Sensuallyte
Earliest known English reference
to Rithmomachia, ~1407.

Little is known about the origin of the game. Medieval writers attributed it to Pythagoras, but no trace of it has been discovered in Greek literature. The earliest surviving mentions of it are from the early 11th century, suggesting it was created in the late 10th or early 11th century. The name and its many variations are from Greek; it is unclear whether this was due to being created by a rare Western European with a classical education that involved learning Greek, or if the game had a genuine origin in Greece and the Greek-speaking Byzantine Empire of the period.

The first written evidence of Rithmomachia dates to around 1030, when a monk named Asilo (probably the future Bishop Adalbero of Würzburg) created a game that illustrated the number theory of Boethius' De institutione arithmetica, for the students of monastery schools. De institutione arithmetica was the standard textbook for instruction in arithmetics in the period for those lucky enough to receive a medieval education. The rules of the game were improved and spelled out more shortly thereafter by another monk, Hermannus Contractus (1013–1054) from Reichenau, and in the school of Liège. In the following centuries, Rithmomachia spread through schools and monasteries in the southern parts of Germany and France. It was used mainly as a teaching aid, but gradually intellectuals started to play it for pleasure. In the 13th century Rithmomachia came to England, where famous mathematician Thomas Bradwardine wrote a text about it. Even Roger Bacon recommended Rithmomachia to his students, while Sir Thomas More let the inhabitants described in the book Utopia play it for recreation. The game was known well enough to justify printed treatises in Latin, French, Italian, and German, in the sixteenth century. Two notices advertising a game set for sale have been found, one in Paris (1556) and the other in London (1563). Nevertheless, no archaeological evidence of the game (such as playing boards) has survived from the medieval and early modern periods, in contrast to many other board games.

Rithmomachia was at its most popular in the 16th century. The Tudor polymath, statesman and publisher of the Geneva Bible, Sir Rowland Hill, published on the game under the title The most ancient and learned Playe, called the Philosopher's Game invented for the honest recreation of Students and other sober persons, in passing the tedious of tyme to the release of their labours, and the exercise of their Wittes in 1562; his house at Soulton Hall also contains a board for the game on a basement parlour or prayer room.

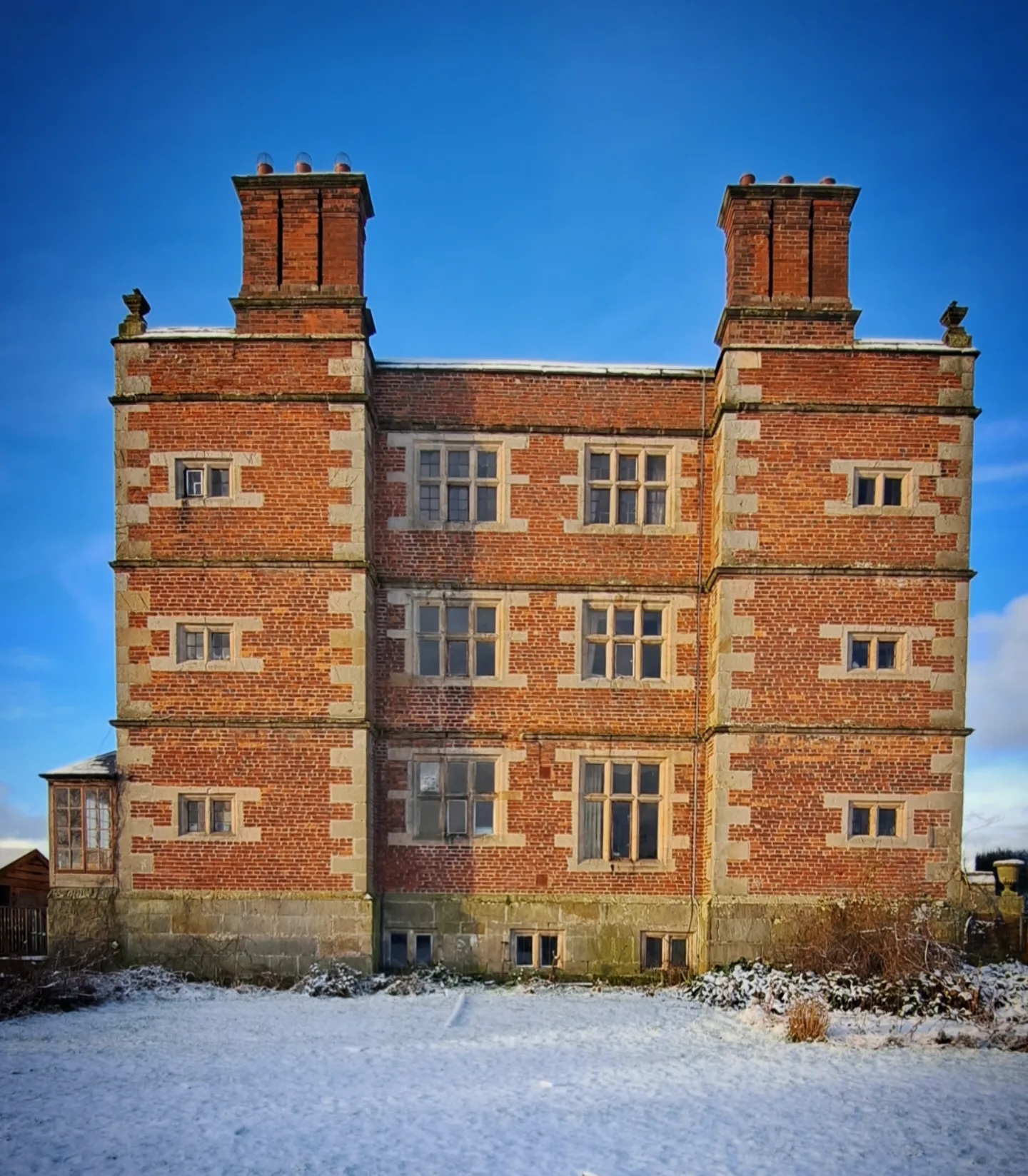
Sir Rowland Hill's headquarters in Shropshire: the tiled floor of a basement room contains a 16th century Rithmomachia board

In 1572 Francesco Barozzi published a version in Venice which was translated into German by Augustus II, Duke of Brunswick. It lost its popularity sharply in the 17th century, virtually disappearing as the style of teaching mathematics changed, and Boethius's mathematics was considered old-fashioned and obsolete. One issue was that the rules were never standardized, with major variations from teacher to teacher. The game partially survived by clinging to the now far more popular chess. Gustavus Selenus included the rules of rithmomachia as an appendix in one of his books on chess, and the game persisted as "arithmetic chess" or "numerical checkers" as a side mention in German chess books for some time afterward, a curiosity but a rarely-played one. The game was rediscovered in the 20th century by historians of board games such as Arno Borst.

== Gameplay ==
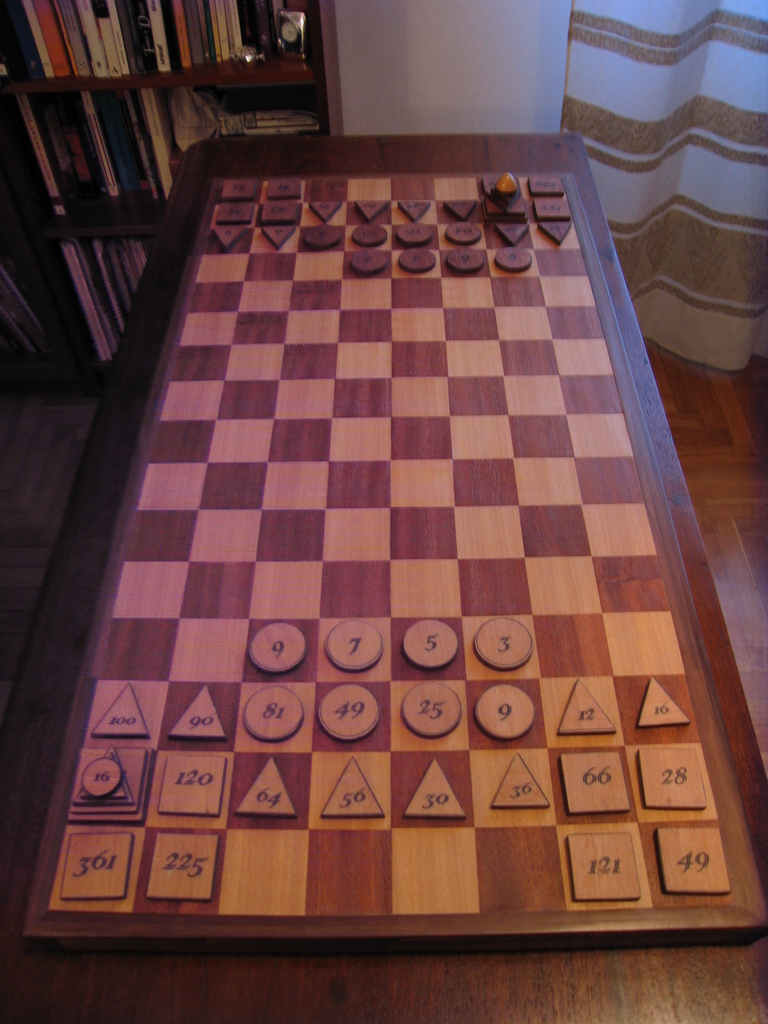
Hand-made Rithmomachy set

Rithmomachia is played on a board resembling the one used for chess or checkers with eight squares on the shorter side, but with sixteen on the longer side. The forms used for the pieces were triangles, squares, and rounds. Pyramids could be formed by stacking pieces. The game was noteworthy in that the black and white forces were not symmetrical. Although each side had the same array of pieces, the numbers on them differed, allowing different possible captures and winning configurations to the two players.

The rules below describe the most common version of the game, played through much of the Middle Ages and Renaissance. There was also a variant propounded by Fulke in the 16th century, with significantly different (and somewhat more consistent) capture rules.

=== Pieces ===
There are four types of pieces: Rounds, Triangles, Squares, and Pyramids.

- Rounds: Rounds move one square in any of the four diagonals (although there is a version of the game where circles only move one square vertically or horizontally - see Richards, 1946, in the references below).
- Triangles: Triangles can move exactly two squares vertically or horizontally, but not diagonally.
- Squares: Squares can move exactly three squares vertically or horizontally, but not diagonally.
- Pyramids: Pyramids are not actually one piece, but more than one piece put together. The white pyramid is made of a "36" square, a "25" square, a "16" triangle, a "9" triangle, a "4" round, and a "1" round, which totals up to the pyramid's value of 91. The black pyramid is made up of a "64" square, a "49" square, a "36" triangle, a "25" triangle, and a "16" round, which adds up to the pyramid's value of 190. Pyramids can move like a round, a triangle, or a square, as long as they still contain the respective piece, which makes them very valuable. (Again, there is a version of the game where pyramids only contain square subpieces, which changes how they move.)

=== Capturing ===
There were a variety of capture methods. Pieces do not land on another piece to capture it, but instead remain in their square and remove the other. If a piece is captured, it changes sides.

- Meeting: If a piece could capture another piece with the same value by landing on it, the piece stays in its location and the opponent's piece is taken from the board.
- Assault: If a piece with a small value, multiplied by the number of vacant spaces between it and another larger piece is equal to the larger piece, the larger piece is captured.
- Ambuscade: If two pieces' sum is equal to an enemy piece that is placed between the two (i.e. the enemy piece is within a move of both attacking pieces), the enemy piece is captured and removed from the board.
- Siege: If a piece is surrounded on all four sides, it is removed.

=== Victory ===
There were also a variety of victory conditions for determining when a game would end and who the winner was. There were common victories, and proper victories, which were recommended for more skilled players. Proper victories required placing pieces in linear arrangements in the opponent's side of the board, with the numbers formed by the arrangement following various types of numerical progression. The types of progression required — arithmetic, geometric and harmonic — fit with the mathematical and numerological teachings of Boethius.

- Common victories:
  - De corpore (Latin: "by body"): If a player captures a certain number of pieces set by both players, they win the game.
  - De bonis ("by goods"): If a player captures enough pieces to add up to or exceed a certain value that is set by both players, they win the game.
  - De lite ("by lawsuit"): If a player captures enough pieces to add up to or exceed a certain value that is set by both players, and the number of digits in their captured pieces' values are less than a number set by both players, they win the game.
  - De honore ("by honour"): If a player captures enough pieces to add up to or exceed a certain value that is set by both players, and the number of pieces they captured are less than a certain number set by both players, they win the game.
  - De honore liteque ("by honour and lawsuit"): If a player captures enough pieces to add up to or exceed a certain value that is set by both players, the number of digits in their captured pieces' values are less than a number set by both players, and the number of pieces they captured are less than a certain number set by both players, they win the game.
- Proper victories:
  - Victoria magna ("great victory"): This occurs when three pieces that are arranged are in an arithmetic progression.
  - Victoria major ("greater victory"): This occurs when four pieces that are arranged have three pieces that are in a certain progression, and another three pieces that are in another type of progression.
  - Victoria excellentissima ("most excellent victory"): This occurs when four pieces that are arranged have all three types of mathematical progressions in three different groups.

== Bibliography ==
- R. C. Bell, The Boardgame Book, p. 136, ISBN 0-671-06030-9
- Arno Borst, Das mittelalterliche Zahlenkampfspiel, ISBN 3-8253-3750-2
- Jean-Louis Cazaux and Rick Knowlton, A World of Chess: Its Development and Variations Through Centuries and Civilizations, ISBN 978-0786494279
- Underwood Dudley, Numerology, or What Pythagoras Wrought, Chapter 17, "Rithmomachy", Mathematical Association of America, ISBN 0-88385-524-0
- Menso Folkerts, Die «Rithmachia» des Werinher von Tegernsee, in M. Folkerts - J. P. Hogendijk, Vestigia mathematica: Studies in Medieval and Early Modern Mathematics in Honour of H.L.L. Busard, Amsterdam 1993, pp. 107–142
- William Fulke (1563), translating Boissiere (1556), The Most Noble, ancient and learned playe, called the Philosopher's Game, STC 15542a. Online transcription
- Jean-Marie Lhôte, Histoire des jeux de société, pp. 201 & 598-9, ISBN 2-08-010929-4
- Ann E. Moyer, The Philosopher's Game, University of Michigan Press, ISBN 0-472-11228-7
- David Parlett, The Oxford History of Board Games, pp. 332–342, ISBN 0-19-212998-8
- J.F.C. Richards, Boissiere’s Pythagorean game, Scripta Mathematica 12(1946)177-217.
- David Sepkoski, "Ann E. Moyer: The Philosopher’s Game: Rithmomachia in Medieval and Renaissance Europe.” Isis, Vol. 95, No. 4 (December 2004), pp. 697–699.
- Joseph Strutt and J. Charles Cox, Strutt's Sports & Pastimes of the People of England, pp. 254–5
