= Cuthbert Hacket =

English merchant

Sir Cuthbert Hacket (died November 1631) was an English merchant who was Lord Mayor of London in 1626.

Hacket was a city of London merchant and a member of the Worshipful Company of Dyers. On 26 September 1616 he was elected an alderman of the City of London for Portsoken ward. He was Sheriff of London for the year 1616 to 1617. He translated to the Worshipful Company of Drapers on 24 January 1623. He became alderman for Bridge ward in 1624. In 1626, he was elected Lord Mayor of London and was also Master of the Drapers Company. He was knighted on 20 May 1627.

Sir Roger Jones, alderman and Sheriff of London for 1604 to 1605 married a sister of Cuthbert Hacket. Cuthbert married Judeth Woar, daughter of Richard Woar a dyer from London. His son Roger Hacket was an eloquent divine. His daughter, Judith (d, 28 Jan 1657/8), married Sir Thomas Dawes (d. 5 Dec 1655).

== Extyernal links ==
- Hutchinson, John (1892). "Cuthbert Aket" . Men of Kent and Kentishmen (Subscription ed.). Canterbury: Cross & Jackman. pp. 3–4.

Civic offices
Preceded by Allan Cotton	Lord Mayor of the City of London; 1626	Succeeded by Hugh Hamersley
