= Richard Dean =

Richard Dean may refer to:

- Richard Dean (model), American athlete, model and photographer
- Richard D. Dean, United States Army general
- Richard Dean (civil servant) (1772−1850), British civil servant
- Richard Dean (curate), Anglican minister and animal rights writer
- Richard Dean (racing driver), British racing driver

== See also ==
- Dick Dean, American automobile designer and builder of custom cars
- Richard Deane (disambiguation)
- Richard Dean Anderson, American actor and producer
