= Robert Ducie =

English merchant

Sir Robert Ducie, 1st Baronet (1575 – June 1634) was an English merchant who was Lord Mayor of London in 1631. He was banker to King Charles I.

Ducie was the eldest surviving son of Henry Ducie, merchant of London and his wife Mary Hardy. He was a city of London merchant and a member of the Worshipful Company of Merchant Taylors. On 4 December 1620, he was elected an alderman of the City of London for Farringdon Without ward. He was Sheriff of London from 1620 to 1621. He was a member of the committee of the East India Company from 1621 to 1630. In 1625 he became alderman for Billingsgate and in 1627 for Bassishaw. He became president of St Bartholomew's Hospital in 1628 and was created a Baronet on 28 November 1629. In 1631, he was elected Lord Mayor of London. He was on the committee of the East India Company again from 1631 to 1633.

Ducie accumulated immense wealth as a merchant, and despite having lost £80,000 when the King was driven from London during the Civil War, he was reputedly worth more than £400,000 at his death.

Ducie married Elizabeth Pyott, daughter of Richard Pyott, Alderman of London, ca. 1608, and they had four sons:

- Sir Richard Ducie, 2nd Bt. d. 1656
- Sir William Ducie, 3rd Bt.
- Henry Ducie Esq.
- Robert Ducie Esq.

Civic offices
Preceded by Sir James Cambell	Lord Mayor of the City of London; 1631	Succeeded by Sir George Whitmore
Baronetage of England
New creation	Baronet (of London); 1629–1634	Succeeded by Robert Ducie
