= Look (American magazine) =

American general-interest magazine (1937–1971)

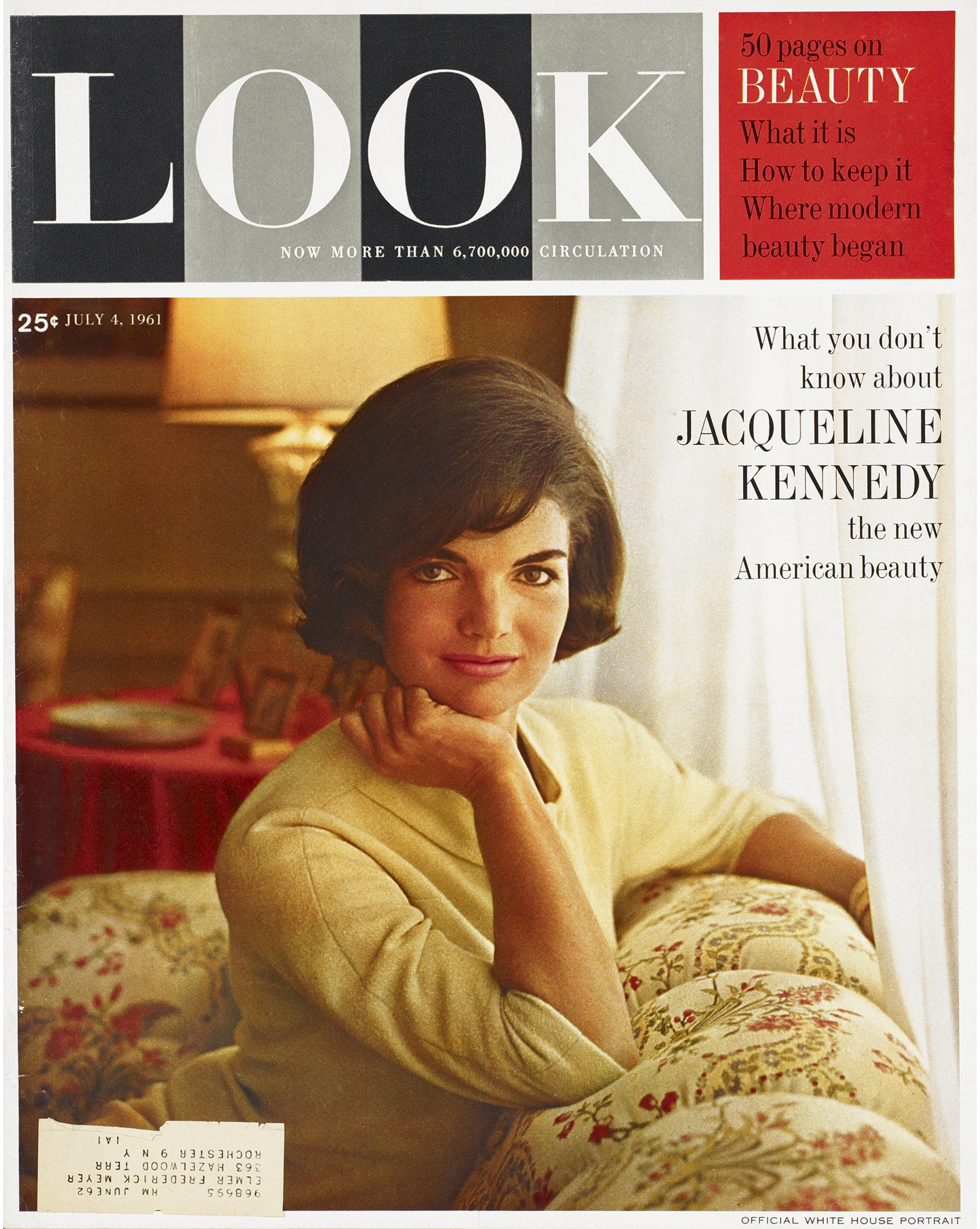
- Issue cover dated July 4, 1961, featuring Jackie Kennedy
- Frequency: Bi-weekly
- First issue: January 2, 1937
- Final issue: October 19, 1971
- Company: Cowles Media
- Country: United States
- Based in: Des Moines, Iowa
- Language: English
- ISSN: 0024-6336

Look was a biweekly, general-interest magazine published in Des Moines, Iowa, from March 1937 to October 1971, with editorial offices in New York City. Look began as a tabloid-style magazine emphasizing sports, movie stars, and sensationalism; after World War II, it became more family-oriented and covered social and political subjects, as well as personalities, food, fashion, and sports. It published many important articles about racial injustice and the civil rights movement. “A large-sized magazine of 11 in × 14 in (279 mm × 356 mm), it was a direct competitor to market leader Life. Look ceased publication in 1971.

== Origin ==
Gardner "Mike" Cowles Jr. (1903–1985), the magazine's co-founder (with his brother John) and first editor, was executive editor of The Des Moines Register and The Des Moines Tribune. When the first issue went on sale in early 1937, it sold 705,000 copies.

Although planned to begin with the January 1937 issue, the actual first issue of Look to be distributed was the February 1937 issue, numbered as Volume 1, Number 2. It was published monthly for five issues (February–May 1937), then switched to biweekly starting with the May 11, 1937 issue. Page numbering on early issues counted the front cover as page one. Early issues, subtitled Monthly Picture Magazine, carried no advertising.

The unusual format of the early issues featured layouts of photos with long captions or very short articles. The magazine's backers described it as "an experiment based on the tremendous unfilled demand for extraordinary news and feature pictures". It was aimed at a broader readership than Life, promising trade papers that Look would have "reader interest for yourself, for your wife, for your private secretary, for your office boy".

=== Highlights ===
From 1946 to 1970, Look published the Football Writers Association of America College All America Football Team and brought players and selected writers to New York City for a celebration. During that 25-year period, the FWAA team was introduced on national television shows by Bob Hope, Steve Allen, Perry Como, and others.

Its January 24, 1956, article "The Shocking Story of Approved Killing in Mississippi", included murder confessions from J. W. Milam and Roy Bryant, who had been acquitted in 1955 of killing 14-year-old boy Emmett Till.

Look was the first major magazine for largely white audiences that hired an African American staff writer, Ernest Dunbar, in 1954, and published the first photograph of a Black fashion model, Bani Yelverton, in 1958.

Look became particularly progressive politically in the 1960s under editors Daniel Mich and Patricia Carbine, who became the first woman to be executive editor of a large American publication that was not a "women's magazine."

== Circulation peak ==
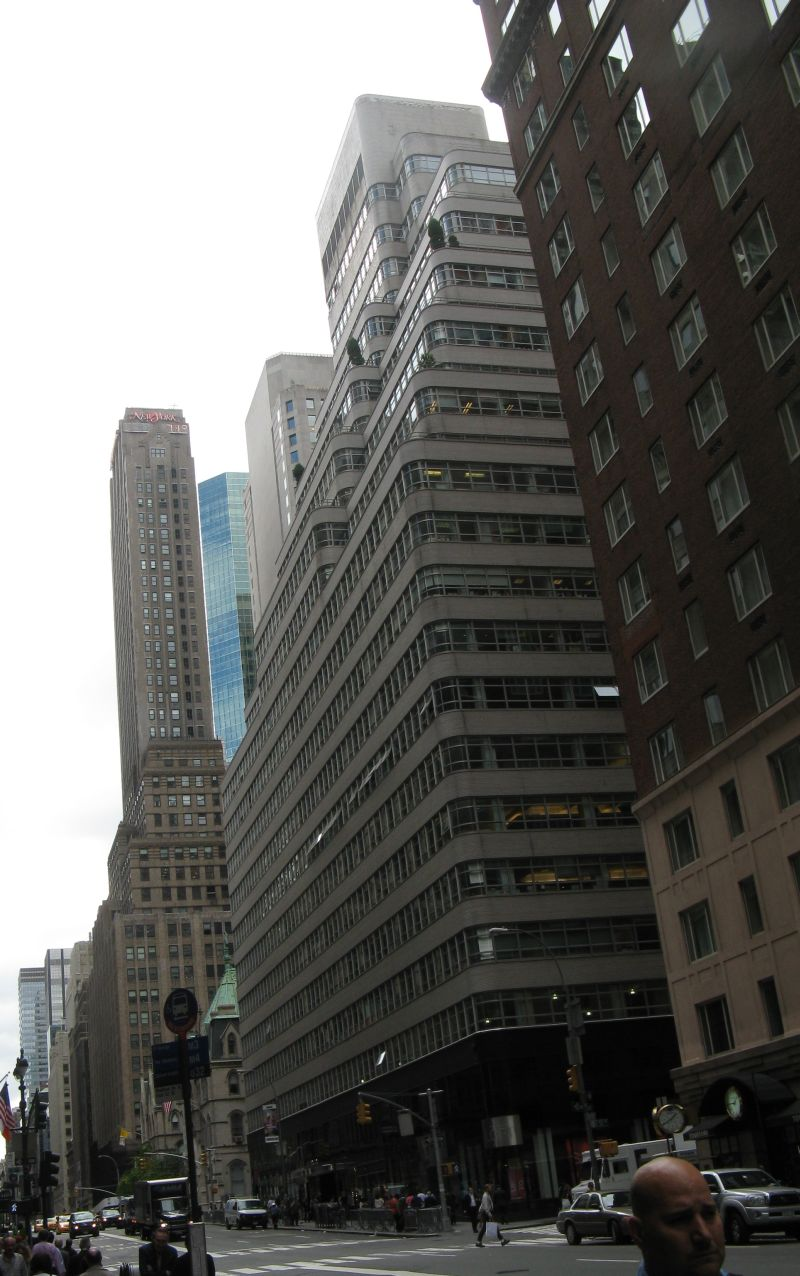
Look Building on Madison Avenue in New York

Within weeks of its debut, more than a million copies were bought of each issue, and it became a biweekly. By 1948, it sold 2.9 million copies per issue. Circulation reached 3.7 million in 1954, and peaked at 7.75 million in 1969. Its advertising revenue reached its highest point in 1966 at $80 million (equivalent to $793.85 million in 2025). Of the leading general-interest, large-format magazines, Look had a circulation second only to Life and ahead of The Saturday Evening Post, which closed in 1969, and Collier's, which folded in 1956.

Look was published under various company names: Look, Inc. (1937–45), Cowles Magazines (1946–65), and Cowles Communications, Inc. (1965–71). Its New York editorial offices were opened in the architecturally distinctive new 488 Madison Avenue in 1950, dubbed the "Look Building", on the National Register of Historic Places since 2005.

Look ceased publication with its issue of October 19, 1971, the victim of a $5 million loss (equivalent to $41.45 million in 2025) in revenues in 1970 (with television cutting deeply into its advertising revenues), a slack economy, and rising postal rates. Circulation was at 6.5 million when it closed.

== After 1971 ==
French publisher Hachette brought back Look, the Picture Newsmagazine in February 1979 as a biweekly in a slightly smaller size. It lasted only a year. Subscribers received copies of Esquire to fulfill their terms.

The Look Magazine Photograph Collection was donated to the Library of Congress and contains about five million items.

After the closure, six Look employees created a fulfillment house using the computer system newly developed by the magazine's circulation department. The company, CDS Global, became an international provider of customer relationship services.

== Notable staff photographers and illustrators ==
=== Stanley Kubrick ===
Stanley Kubrick was a staff photographer for Look before starting his career in feature films. Of the more than 300 assignments Kubrick did for Look from 1946 to 1951, more than 100 are in the Library of Congress collection. All Look jobs with which he was associated have been cataloged with descriptions focusing on the images that were printed. Other related Kubrick material is located at the Museum of the City of New York.

=== Frank Bauman ===
Frank Bauman was a staff photographer for Look following his career as war correspondent in World War II. Bauman worked alongside Margaret Bourke-White to document life in Cuba and the Soviet Union during the Cold War. Bauman was known for his experimental styles, and collaborated with Doc Edgerton to develop the Stroboscopic effect, which proved the curveball curves and settled a longstanding dispute.

=== William Bradford Huie ===
Alabama journalist William Bradford Huie was commissioned by Look and other periodicals to write articles about the Civil Rights Movement in the South. In January 1956, he published an interview in Look in which two of the six white men who killed Emmett Till admitted their guilt and described their crime. They had been acquitted at trial several months previously by an all-white jury. His work for Look was criticized at the time as "checkbook journalism", because he was known to pay interviewees to speak with them.

=== James Karales ===
James Karales was a photographer for Look from 1960 to 1971. Covering the Civil Rights Movement throughout its duration, he took many memorable photographs, including the iconic photograph of the Selma to Montgomery march showing people proudly marching along the highway under a cloudy, turbulent sky.

=== Norman Rockwell ===
Beginning in 1963, Norman Rockwell, after closing his career with the Saturday Evening Post, began making illustrations for Look. Among Rockwell's 30 paintings for Look were his powerful civil rights paintings, "The Problem We All Live With" and "Murder in Mississippi."

== See also ==
- List of defunct American periodicals
- Marjorie S. Deane
