= Henry Dean =

Henry Dean may refer to:

- Henry Clay Dean (1822–1887), U.S. 19th century anti-war activist and clergyman
- H. Trendley Dean (1893–1962), American dentist
- Henry Roy Dean (1879–1961), professor of pathology

== See also ==
- Harry Dean (disambiguation)
- Henry Deane (disambiguation)
