= Richard Deane (Lord Mayor) =

English merchant

Sir Richard Deane (died July 1635) was an English merchant who was Lord Mayor of London in 1628.

Deane was a city of London merchant and a member of the Worshipful Company of Skinners. He was Sheriff of London from 1619 to 1620 and was Master of the Skinners Company in 1619. On 17 February 1620, he was elected an alderman of the City of London for Bridge Without ward. He became alderman of Farringdon Within ward in 1626 and was Master of the Skinners Company again in 1626. In 1628, he was elected Lord Mayor of London. He became alderman for Candlewick ward in 1628 and was knighted on 31 May 1629.

Deane's daughters married William Methold and Robert Myldmay who were both aldermen.

Civic offices
Preceded by Hugh Hamersley	Lord Mayor of the City of London; 1628	Succeeded by James Cambell
