= Marjorie S. Deane =

American fashion journalist

Marjorie Schlesinger Deane (April 18, 1923 – November 22, 2003) was an American fashion authority and industry leader for more than sixty years. She was the chairman of the Tobe Report, an influential weekly merchandising publication and consulting service, with clients responsible for over $400 billion in sales at the time of her death.

She began her fashion career in the Executive Training Program at the Franklin Simon Department Store. While there, she also attended Finch College and then the Tobe Coburn School, where she graduated with distinction in 1943, earning the top alumni prize, the Mehitabel, on two occasions. Following Franklin Simon, she worked at The Tobe Report, and then was recruited by Macy's, becoming its first female senior vice president. At Macy's she was responsible for many innovations, and was one of the first women to cover the European collections, to which she returned for the next fifty years.

While at Macy's, she was asked by Fleur Cowles to be the Fashion Editor at Look Magazine. In 1963, she returned to the Tobe Report, eventually assuming full ownership. At Tobe, she advised most of the largest retailers in the world, including Federated Department Stores, The May Company, Wal-Mart, Neiman Marcus, Sears, Saks Fifth Avenue and more than two hundred other clients. She was considered to have been the first journalist to have championed many of the nation's top designers, including Calvin Klein, Perry Ellis and Halston. She was at the first Dior and St. Laurent presentations, and was one of their earliest proponents.

Marjorie Deane also served on many boards, including The Girl Scouts of New York (for which she chaired their first million-dollar fundraiser) and the Kips Bay Boys and Girls Club, where she was a co-founder of the Decorator's Show House. She was also the chair of the Lenox School and Finch College Boards, in addition to being the president of the Fashion Group, and working on the CFDA and Coty boards.
