= Allan Cotton =

English merchant and Lord Mayor of London

Sir Allan Cotton
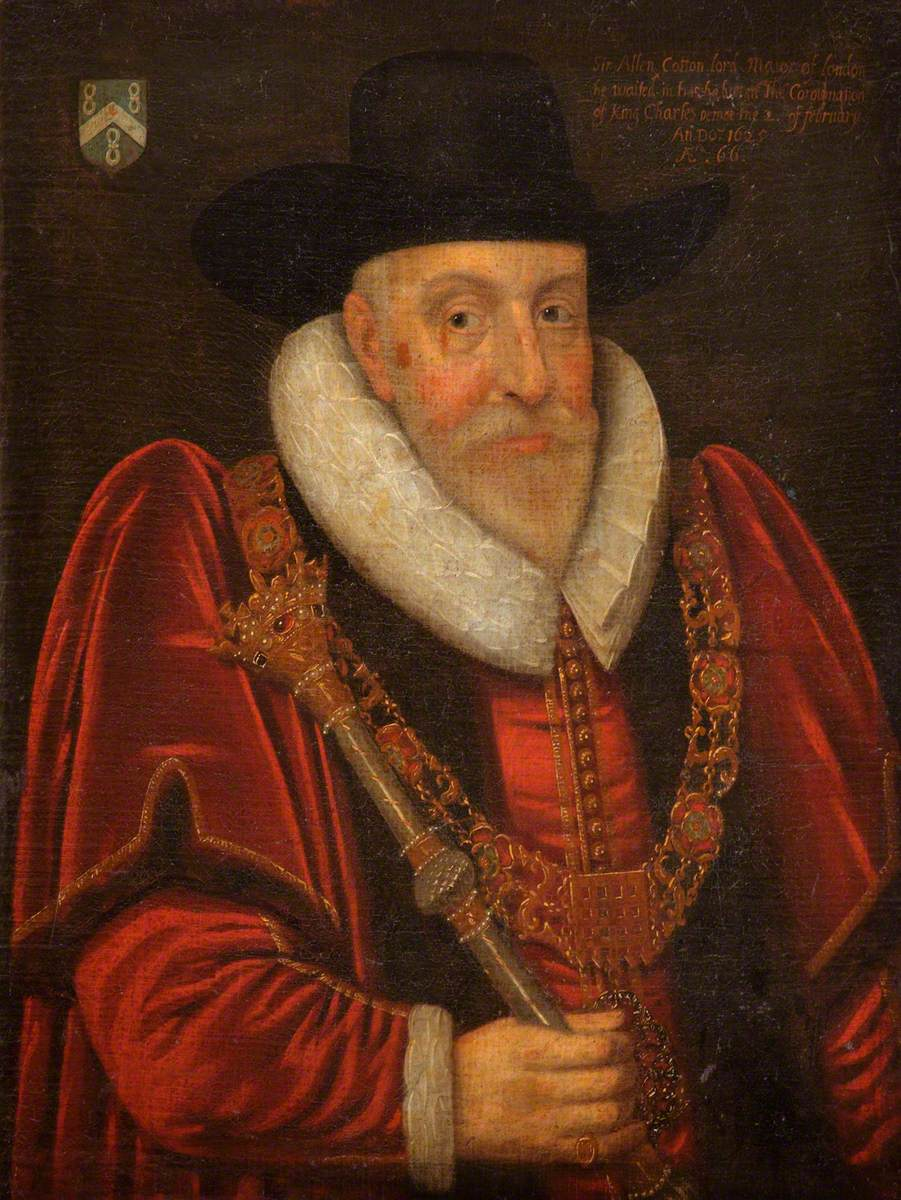

Personal details
- Born: c. 1568 Whitchurch, Shropshire
- Died: December, 1628
- Resting place: St Martin Orgar, City of London, England

Sir Allan Cotton or Allen (c. 1568 ― December, 1628) was an English merchant who was Lord Mayor of London in 1625. He was born in Whitchurch, Shropshire to Ralph Cotton of Alkington and Jane Cotton. Allan came from a Shropshire branch of the Cheshire minor noble family Coton which had existed since the 13th century at least.

Cotton was a city of London merchant and a member of the Worshipful Company of Drapers. On 9 July 1616 he was elected an alderman of the City of London for Dowgate ward. He was Sheriff of London and Master of the Drapers Company for 1616 to 1617. In 1625 he became alderman for Candlewick ward and was elected Lord Mayor of London. He was knighted on 4 June 1626. In 1627 he became president of St Bartholomew's Hospital.

Civic offices
Preceded by John Gore	Lord Mayor of the City of London; 1625	Succeeded by Cuthbert Hacket
