= William Deane (cricketer) =

English cricketer

Personal information
- Full name: Marmaduke William Deane
- Born: 25 March 1857; Petersham, Surrey, England
- Died: 7 November 1936 (aged 79); Dorking, Surrey, England
- Batting: Right-handed
- Role: Wicket-keeper

Domestic team information
- Years: Team
- 1880: Surrey
- 1895: Hampshire

Career statistics
Competition	First-class
Matches	5
Runs scored	6
Batting average	2.28
100s/50s	–/–
Top score	8
Catches/stumpings	6/4
- Source: Cricinfo, 16 January 2010

Marmaduke William Deane (25 March 1857 – 7 November 1936) was an English first-class cricketer.

The son of John Parker Deane, he was born in March 1857 at Petersham, Surrey. A wicket-keeper, he made his debut in first-class cricket for Surrey against Nottinghamshire at Trent Bridge in 1880. Fifteen years later he played first-class cricket for Hampshire in the 1895 County Championship, deputising for Charles Robson in four matches. In five first-class matches, he took six catches and made four stumpings. Deane died at Dorking in November 1936.
