= Charles Deane =

Charles Deane may refer to:

- Charles Deane (cricketer) (1885–1914), English cricketer
- Charles Anthony Deane (1796–1848), UK diving engineer
- Charles B. Deane (1898–1969), US representative from North Carolina
- Charles B. Deane Jr. (1937–2022), American lawyer and politician
- C. W. Deane (1837–1914), American politician, Michigan state representative

== See also ==
- Charles Dean (disambiguation)
