= Charles Dean (baseball) =

American baseball player

- Catcher

Negro league baseball debut
- 1943, for the Atlanta Black Crackers

Last appearance
- 1943, for the New York Black Yankees

Teams
- Atlanta Black Crackers (1943); New York Black Yankees (1943)

Charles Dean is an American former Negro league catcher who played in the 1940s.

Dean played for the Atlanta Black Crackers and the New York Black Yankees in 1943. In three recorded games, he posted one hit in 11 plate appearances.
