= Greg Taube =

Australian rules footballer

Personal information
- Full name: Gregor Manfred Taube
- Born: 18 April 1938
- Died: 28 August 2021 (aged 83)
- Original team: Spotswood
- Height: 188 cm (6 ft 2 in)
- Weight: 86 kg (190 lb)

Playing career^{1}
| Years | Club | Games (Goals) |
| 1959–60 | South Melbourne | 5 (1) |
| 1961–64 | Williamstown (VFA) | |
- ^{1} Playing statistics correct to the end of 1960.

Gregor Manfred Taube (18 April 1938 – 28 August 2021) is a former Australian rules footballer who played with South Melbourne in the Victorian Football League (VFL). He transferred to Williamstown in 1961 and played 73 games and kicked 2 goals up until the end of 1964. He played in the losing 1961 VFA grand final against Yarraville, and was judged equal best first-year player the same season. He finished in third place in the 1963 Club best and fairest award.
