= Walter Deane =

American botanist (1848–1930)

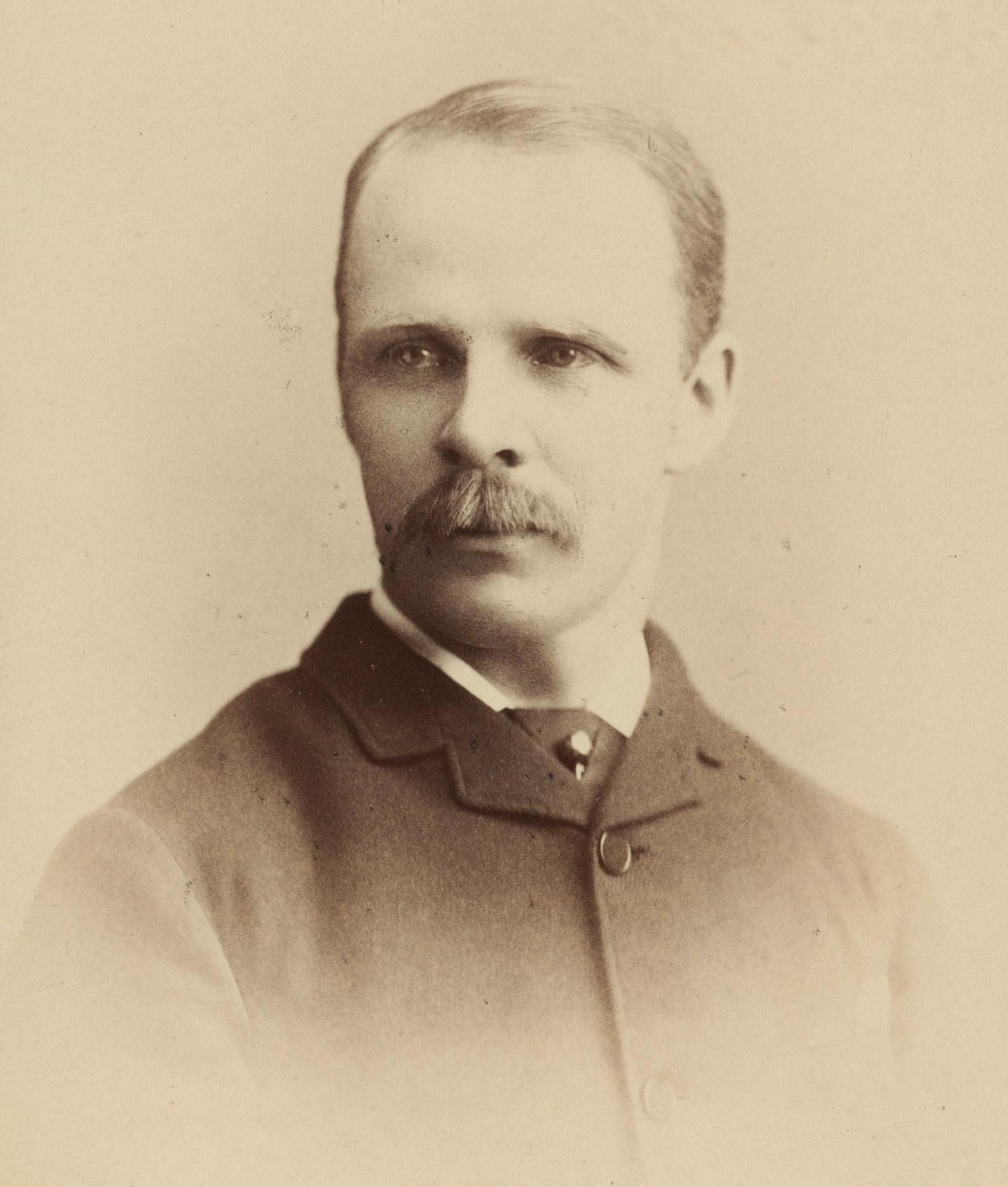
- Born: April 23, 1848; Boston, Massachusetts
- Died: July 30, 1930 (aged 82)
- Resting place: Mount Auburn Cemetery
- Education: Harvard College

Walter Deane (April 23, 1848 – July 30, 1930) was an American amateur botanist and ornithologist. Born in Boston, Massachusetts, he graduated from Harvard College in 1870. He was a founding member of the New England Botanical Club and served as its president from 1908 to 1911. From 1897 to 1907 he was curator of William Brewster's ornithological museum, and prepared Brewster's Birds of the Cambridge Region. Deane is commemorated in the plant genus Deanea Coulter & Rose. The standard author abbreviation W.Deane is used to indicate this person as the author when citing a botanical name.

Deane was the older brother of ornithologist Ruthven Deane.
