= Ron Viney =

Australian rules footballer

Personal information
- Full name: Ron Viney
- Born: 21 February 1949 (age 77)
- Original team: Spotswood
- Height: 185 cm (6 ft 1 in)
- Weight: 80 kg (176 lb)

Playing career^{1}
Years	Club	Games (Goals)
1968	South Melbourne	5 (3)
- ^{1} Playing statistics correct to the end of 1968.

Ron Viney (born 21 February 1949) is a former Australian rules footballer who played with South Melbourne in the Victorian Football League (VFL).
