= Richard Deane (priest) =

Irish Anglican priest in the 1600s

Richard Deane was an Irish Anglican priest in the second half of the 17th century.

Daene was educated at Trinity College, Dublin after which he became Vicar of Rower. He was deprived after the Irish Rebellion of 1641. In 1662 he became a prebendary of Lismore and a year later Archdeacon of Waterford, He was archdeacon until his resignation in 1667; and prebendary until 1680.
