= John Deane =

John Deane may refer to:

- John Deane (Australian politician) (1842–1913), politician in Queensland, Australia
- John Deane (colonial administrator) (fl. 1723–1732), administrator of the East India Company
- John Deane (inventor) (1800–1884), co-inventor of the diving helmet
- John Deane (MP) (1583–1626), English Member of Parliament, 1621–1622
- John Deane (of Oxenwood) (c. 1632–1694), English Member of Parliament elected in 1689
- John Deane (sailor) (1679–1761), English sailor
- John Bathurst Deane (1797–1887), curate, antiquary and author
- John F. Deane (born 1943), Irish poet and novelist
- John M. Deane (1840–1914), U.S. soldier
- John Philip Deane (1796–1849), Australian musician
- John R. Deane (1896–1982), U.S. Army officer and author
- John R. Deane Jr. (1919–2013), U.S. soldier
- John Deane, radio astronomer and CSIRO co-inventor of IEEE 802.11 Wi-Fi networking standard

== See also ==
- John Dean (disambiguation)
