= James Cambell =

English merchant (c. 1570–1642)

Sir James Cambell or Campbell (c. 1570 – 5 January 1642) was an English merchant who was Lord Mayor of London in 1630.

Cambell was the son of Sir Thomas Campbell, Alderman of the City of London, and his wife Alice Bright, daughter of Edward Bright of London. He was a grandson of Robert Campbell of Foulsham, Norfolk.

Like his father, Campbell became a City merchant and joined the Worshipful Company of Ironmongers. He was elected Sheriff of London in 1614 but did not take office immediately. He was Master of the Ironmongers' Company in 1615. In 1619, he became Sheriff and was elected Alderman of the City of London for Billingsgate Ward on 20 May 1620. He was on the committee of the East India Company from 1622 to 1629. In 1623, he was Master of the Ironmongers' Company again. He became Alderman for Lime Street Ward in May 1625. In 1626, he became president of St Thomas' Hospital, remaining in post until 1642. He became Lord Mayor of London in 1629 for 1630. He was knighted on 23 May 1630. In 1631, he became a Colonel of the Trained Bands. He was on the committee of the East India Company again from 1631 to 1634 and from 1635 to 1640. In 1641, he was Master of the Ironmongers' Company for a third time. He became Governor of the French Company and of the Merchants of the Staple.

Sir Thomas died in 1642. According to his will, he left almost £50,000 to a large number of legacies to relatives, friends, London hospitals, a free school at Barking in Essex, the Ironmongers' Company, and for the ransom of poor captives from Turkish slavery.

His widow, Rachel (Lady Campbell), survived until January 1657, but he left no children. His brother, Sir Robert Campbell, was also a City Alderman and served as Master Ironmonger in 1631.

Civic offices
Preceded by Sir Richard Deane	Lord Mayor of London; 1629-30	Succeeded by Sir Robert Ducie, 1st Baronet
