= Henry Deane =

Henry Deane may refer to:

- Henry Deane (archbishop of Canterbury) (c. 1440–1503)
- Henry Deane (engineer) (1847–1924), Australian engineer
- Harry Deane (1846–1925), American baseball player
- Sir Bargrave Deane (Henry Bargrave Deane, 1848–1919), English judge

== See also ==
- Henry Dean (disambiguation)
