= John Dean (footballer) =

Australian rules footballer

Personal information
- Full name: John Dean
- Born: 16 April 1956 (age 70)
- Original team: Spotswood
- Height: 188 cm (6 ft 2 in)
- Weight: 83 kg (183 lb)

Playing career^{1}
Years	Club	Games (Goals)
1975	South Melbourne	4 (0)
- ^{1} Playing statistics correct to the end of 1975.

John Dean (born 16 April 1956) is a former Australian rules footballer who played with South Melbourne in the Victorian Football League (VFL).
