= List of sheriffs of the City of London =

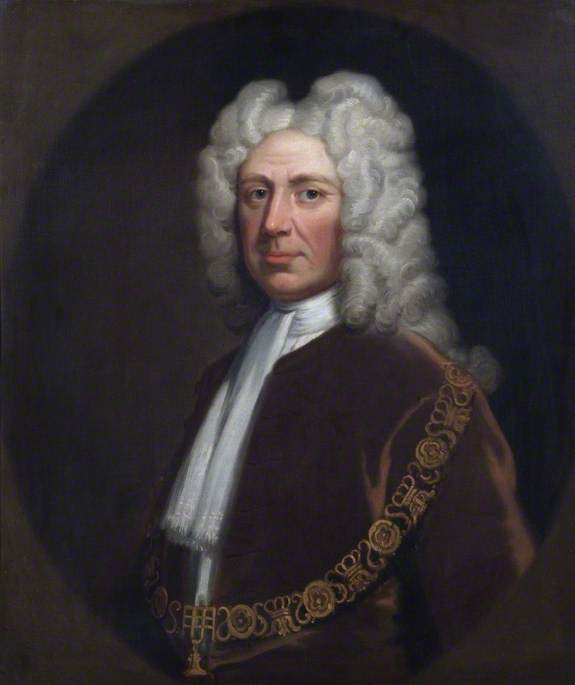
Portrait of Sir Thomas Abney, the sheriff of London in 1694

This is a list of Sheriffs of the City of London. Pursuant to a royal charter of Henry I c. 1131, the liverymen of the City elected two sheriffs of "London and Middlesex" upon payment of £300 per annum to the Crown. This practice continued until 1889, when the Local Government Act 1888 came into force. Thereafter a High Sheriff of Middlesex and a High Sheriff of the County of London were separately appointed in the same manner as other English and Welsh counties.

== Sheriffs of London ==
Sheriffs of London before the 12th century:

- Wolgarius
- Geffrey de Magnum
- Hugh Bock
- William de Eynesford
- 1125–1141 Abericus de Vere (killed May 1141)
- Gilbert Beck, Peter Fitz-Walter
- John Fitz-Negelly, Ernulph Buchel

=== 12th century ===
Sheriffs of London in the 12th century:

- 1125 Roger de Cornhill, AKA Roger FitzWilliam
- 1128 Fulcred Fitz Walter
- 1130 Four sheriffs. Pipe Roll of 1129-30 says they were William Lelutre, Ralph son of Herlewin, William de Balio and Geoffrey Bucherell (PR 31 Henry I, p. 149)
- 1134–1141 Osbert Huitdeniers
- 1142 Geoffrey de Mandeville
- 1154 Four Sheriffs
- 1155 Gervase de Cornhill and John
- 1156 Gervase de Cornhill and John the son of Radulph
- 1157 Gervase de Cornhill
- 1158 Remiencus, son of Berigarii
- 1159
- 1160 John, son of Radulph
- 1160–1161 Gervase de Cornhill
- 1161 Erisaldus Sutarius and Vital clericus
- 1162–1168 Remiencus, son of Berigarii and William, son of Isabel
- 1169 John Bievinitte and Baldwin clericus
- 1170–1173 Rad Orificus and Rad le Vinter
- 1174–1176 Bricknerus de Haverhill and Peter, son of Walter
- 1177 William, son of Isabel
- 1178 Waleran and John, son of Nigel
- 1179 William, son of Isabel and Arnolphus Buxell
- 1180–1182 William and Reginald le Vielle
- 1183–1188 William, son of Isabel
- 1188 Henry de Cornhill (son of Gervase, HS 1155), Richard Reyner
- 1189 John Herlisum, Roger le Duc
- 1190 William de Havylle, John Bokoynte
- 1191 Nichole Duket, Peres Nevlum
- 1192 Roger le Duc, Roger fil. Alani
- 1193 William fil. Isabel, William fil. Aluf
- 1194 Robert Besant, Jukel Alderman
- 1195 Godard de Antioche, Ro. fil. Durant
- 1196 Robert Blundul, Nichole Duket
- 1197 Constantine fil. Aluf (hanged 1222), Rob. de Bel
- 1198 Arnaud fil. Aluf. Rich. fil. Barthelmi
- 1199 Roger de Desert, Jacob Alderman

=== 13th century ===
Sheriffs of London in the 13th century:

- 1200 Simon de Aldermanbury, William fil. Aliz
- 1201 Norman le Blunt, John de Ely (aka Johannes de Kayo; aka Johan de Kai)
- 1202 Walter le Brun, William Chaumberleyn
- 1203 Thomas de Haville, Hamund Brand.
- 1204 John Waleran, Richard de Winchester
- 1205 John Elylond, Edmund de la Halle
- 1206 Serle Mercier, Henry de Sent Auban
- 1207 Robert de Wincestre, William Hardell
- 1208 Thomas fil. Neel, Peres le Duc (Peter Duke, son of Roger, HS 1189)
- 1209 Peres le Juneen, William Wite
- 1210 Stephen Crassul (le Gros), Adam Whiteby
- 1211 Goce fil. Peres, John Gerlande
- 1212 Constantine Unienis (le Juvene), Ralph Elyland
- 1213 Martin fil. Aliz, Peter Bate
- 1214 Salomon de Basing, Hugo de Basing
- 1215 Andrew Nevelun, John Travers
- 1216 Benet le Seynter, William Blundus
- 1217 Ralph Elyland, Thomas Bokerel
- 1218 Goce le Pesur, John Viel
- 1219 John Viel, Richard de Wimbledon
- 1220 Richard Renger, Goce Juniens
- 1221 Richard Renger, Thomas Lambert
- 1222 Thomas Lambert, William Joyner
- 1223 John Travers, Andrew Bokerel
- 1224 John Travers, Andrew Bokerel
- 1225 Martyn fil. William, Roger le Duc (Roger Duke, son of Peter, HS 1208)
- 1226 Martyn fil. William, Roger le Duc
- 1227 Henry de Cochin, Stephen Bokerel
- 1228 Henry de Cochin, Stephen Bokerel
- 1229 Robert fil. John, Walter de Winchester
- 1230 John de Woburne, Richard fil. Walter
- 1231 Walter de Busle, Michael de Seynt Helen
- 1232 Henry Edelmonton, Gerard Bat
- 1233 Roger Blundus, Simon fil. Marie
- 1234 Radulph Eswy, John Norman
- 1235 Gerard Bat, Robert Hardel
- 1236 Henry de Cochin, Jurdan de Coventry
- 1237 John de Walbroc, Gervase Chaumberleyne
- 1238 John de Wilehale, John de Coudres
- 1239 Reiner de Bungeye, Radulph Aswy
- 1240 Michael Tovey, Jean de Gisors
- 1241 John Viel the younger, Thomas Duresme
- 1242 Ralph Eswy, Robert fil. John
- 1243 Adam de Gyseburne, Hugo Blundul
- 1244 Nicholas Bat, Radulph de Arcubus (Ralph de Bow)
- 1245 Nicholas Bat (replaced by Robert de Cornhull), Adam de Benetleye
- 1246 Simon fil. Marie, Laurence de Frowick
- 1247 William Viel, Nichole Bat
- 1248 Nicholas fil. Jocei, Galfred de Wincestre
- 1249 John Tolesan, Radulph Hardel
- 1250 Humfrey le Fevre, William fil. Richard
- 1251 Nichole Bat, Laurence de Frowik
- 1252 William de Duresme, Thomas de Winburne
- 1253 Richard Picard, John de Northampton
- 1254 William Eswy, Robert de Linton (both replaced by Stephen de Oystergate and Henry Walerund)
- 1255 Mathias Bokerel, John le Minor
- 1256 William Eswy, Richard Ewelle
- 1257 Thomas Fitzthomas, Robert de Catelonie (died in office and replaced by Mathew Bukerel then William Grapefige)
- 1258 John Adrian, Robert de Cornhull
- 1259 Adam Browning, Henry de Coventry
- 1260 Richard Picard, John de Northampton
- 1261 Philip le Tailleur, Richard de Walbrook
- 1262 Osbert de Suffolchia (Suffolk), Robert de Munpeylers (Montpellier)
- 1263 Gregory de Rokesley, Thomas de Forde
- 1264 Edward Blund, Peter Fitz Aunger
- 1265 Gregory de Rokesley, Simon Hadestok
- 1266 John Adryan, Lucas Badencourt replaced by Roger Marshal and Robert de Lintone
- 1267 William de Durham, Walter Hervey
- 1268 Thomas Basynge, Robert de Cornehyll replaced by Philip Taylour and Walter Porter
- 1269 Walter Porter, Philip Taylour
- 1270 Gregory de Rokesley, Henry le Walleis
- 1271 Rychard Parys, John Bedyll
- 1272 Johan Horne, Walter Porter (2nd term)
- 1273 Nicholas Wynchester, Henry Coventry
- 1274 Lucas Badencourt, Henry Frowyke
- 1275 Johan Horne, Rauffe Blount
- 1276 Robert Bracey, Rauffe Fenour
- 1277 Johan Adryan, Walter Langley
- 1278 Robert Basyng, Wyllyam Meyre
- 1279 Thomas Box (Note: Chronicles of the Reigns of Edward I and Edward II, Annales Londoniensis p.89, states that, in 1280, Thomas Box was temporarily removed from his office between Easter and the vigil of St John the Baptist, but it does not state why. "Thomas Box, a Pascha usque ad vigiliam Sacti Johannis Baptistae, a suo officio fuit amotus ; iterum constitutus per suum novum juramentum" "Thomas Box, from Easter to the vigil of St. John the Baptist, was removed from his office; he was again appointed by his new oath".) (Note: The University of Toronto's Mayors and Sheriffs of London places Thomas Box as Sheriff in 1279-1280 and cites Letter Book A (London Metropolitan Archives COL/AD/01) in saying that Thomas Box was briefly deposed for trespass.) (Note: A New History of London Including Westminster and Southwark Addenda: The Mayors and Sheriffs of London, lists Thomas Box as Sheriff in 1281.) (Note: The Survey of London by John Stow lists Thomas Fox as Sheriff in 1280.) (Note: The Livery Companies of London show Thomas Box was a corder, serving as Sheriff in 1279 and as Alderman of Walbrook from 1285-1293.) (Note: The History and Antiquities of London Westminster Southwark and Parts Adjacent Part I lists Thomas Box as Sheriff in 1280.), Rauffe de la Mare
- 1280 Wylliam Faryngdon, Nicholas Wynchester
- 1281 Wylliam Meyre, Richard Chigwell
- 1282 Rauffe Blunt, Ankeryn Betavill
- 1283 Jordan Goodchepe, Martin Box (Note: The Survey of London by John Stow lists Martin Box as Sheriff in 1284.) (Note: The University of Toronto's Mayors and Sheriffs of London lists Martin Box as Sheriff in 1283-1284, as does Map of Early Modern London) (Note: The History and Antiquities of London, Westminster, Southwark, and Parts Adjacent: Volume 2 lists Martyn Box as Sheriff in 1284.) (Note: The Livery Companies of London show Martin Box was a woolman, serving as Sheriff in 1283 and Alderman for the ward of Cornhill from 1285-1301.)
- 1284 Stephen Cornehyll, Robert Rokesley
- 1285 Walter Blount, John Wade
- 1286 Thomas Crosse, Willyam (or Walter) Hawteyn
- 1287 Wyllyam Hereford, Thomas Stanys
- 1288 Wylliam Betayn, Johan of Canterbury
- 1289 Fulke of St. Edmunde, Saloman Langforde
- 1290 Thomas Romayn, Wylliam de Lyre
- 1291 Rauffe Blount, Hamonde Boxe
- 1292 Henry Bale, Elias Russell
- 1293 Robert Rokesley (the younger), Martyn Awbry
- 1294 Henry Boxe, Richarde Gloucester
- 1295 Johan Dunstable, Adam de Halyngbery
- 1296 Thomas Suffolk, Adam de Fulham
- 1297 Richard de Refham, Thomas Sely
- 1298 John Armenter, Henry Fingrith
- 1299 Lucas de Havering, Richard Champneys
- 1268 William Haddystoke, Anketyll de Alverne
- 1297 John de Stordforde, William de Stortforde

=== 14th century ===
Sheriffs of London in the 14th century:

- 1300 Robert Caller, Peter Bosham
- 1301 Hugh Pourt, Simon Parys
- 1302 William Combmartyn, John de Burfforde
- 1303 Roger Parys, John Lyncoln
- 1304 Reginald Doderell, William Canfyn
- 1305 Symon Bolet, Godfrey de la Conduyt
- 1307 Nicholas Pygotte, Nygell Drury
- 1308 Wyllyam Basynge, John Butler
- 1309 James of St. Edmunde, Roger Palmer
- 1310 Simon Cooper, Peter Blacknay
- 1311 Simon Merwode, Rychard Wylforde
- 1312 John Lambyn, Adam Lutekyn
- 1313 Adam Burden, Hugh Gayton
- 1314 Stephen of Abyngdone, Hamo de Chigwell
- 1315 Hamonde Goodchepe, William Redynge
- 1316 Wyllyam Caston, Rauffe Palmer
- 1317 John Pryoure, Wylliam Furneux
- 1318 John Pulteney, John Dallynge
- 1319 Symon Abyngdon, John Preston
- 1320 Reynolde at Conduit, William Prodham
- 1321 Rychard Constantyne, Richard Hackeney
- 1322 John de Grantham, Rycharde of Ely
- 1323 Adam Salisbury, John of Oxenford
- 1324 Benet of Fulham, John Causton
- 1325 Gylbert Moordon, John Cotton
- 1326 Richard Rothing, Roger Chauntcler
- 1327 Henry Darcey, John Hawteyne
- 1328 Symon Fraunces, Henry Combmartyne
- 1329 Rychard Lazar, Henry Gysors
- 1330 Robert of Ely, Thomas Harwode
- 1331 Johan Mockynge, Andrew Aubrey
- 1332 Nicholas Pyke, Johan Husband
- 1333 Johan Hamonde, Wylliam Hansarde
- 1334 Johan Kyngston, Walter Turke
- 1335 Walter Mordon, Richard Upton
- 1336 Wyllyam Brykelsworth, In. Northall
- 1336 John Clarke and William Curteis
- 1337 Walter Neale, Nicholas Crane
- 1338 Wylliam Pountfreyt, Hugh Marbre
- 1339 Wylliam Thorney, Roger Forsham
- 1340 Adam Lucas, Bartholomewe Morris
- 1341 Richard Barkinge, John Rockyslec
- 1342 John Lovekyn, Richard de Kislingbury
- 1343 John Stewarde, John Aleysham
- 1344 Geoffrey de Wychingham, Thomas Legge
- 1345 Edmond Hempnall, John Glouceter
- 1346 John Croydon, William Clopton
- 1347 Adam Bramson, Richard Basingstoke
- 1348 Henry Picard, Symond Dolsely
- 1349 Adam Bury, Rauffe Lynne
- 1350 John Notte, Wyllyam Worcestre
- 1351 John Wroth, Gylbert Steynthorpe
- 1352 John Pecche, Johan Stotley
- 1353 John Wilde, Johan Lytell
- 1354 William Notingham, Richard Smelt
- 1355 Thomas Forster, Thomas Brandon
- 1356 Richard Notingham, Thomas Dosell
- 1357 Stephen Cavendisshe, Bartholemew Frestelyng
- 1358 John Bernes, John Buryn
- 1359 Symond de Benyngton, John de Chichester
- 1360 Johan Denys, Walter Borney
- 1361 Wyllyam Holbech, James Tame
- 1362 John of St. Albanes, James Andrewes
- 1363 Richard Croydon, Johan Hyltoste
- 1364 Johan of Metforde, Symon de Mordon
- 1365 John Bykylsworth, Johan Irelande
- 1366 John Warde, Thomas of Lee
- 1367 John Tergolde, William Dykman
- 1368 Adam Wymbyngham, Robert Gyrdeler
- 1369 Johan Pyell, Hugh Holbeche
- 1370 William Walworth, Robert Gayton
- 1371 Robert Hatfelde, Adam Stable
- 1372 John Philipot, Nicholas Brembre
- 1373 John Awbry, John Fysshyde
- 1374 Sir Richard Lyons, Wylliam Wodhouse
- 1375 John Hadley, Wylliam Newporte
- 1376 Johan Northampton, Robert Launde
- 1377 Andrew Pykman, Nicholas Twyford
- 1378 John Boseham, Thomas Cornwaleys
- 1379 John Heylesson, Wylliam Baret
- 1380 Walter Doket, Wylliam Knyghthode
- 1381 John Rote, Johan Hynde, William Standon
- 1382 John Sely, Adam Bamme
- 1383 Symond Winchcombe, John More
- 1384 Nicholas Ereton, John Fresshe, Johan Walcot
- 1385 John Organ, Johan Churchman
- 1386 William Standon, William More
- 1387 Wyllyam Venour, Hughe Forstalfe
- 1388 Thomas Austeyne, Adam Carllyll
- 1389 Johan Walcot, Johan Loveney
- 1390 Thomas Vynant, John Francis
- 1391 John Shadworth, Henry Vaunere
- 1392 Giibert Manfelde, Thomas Newyngtyn
- 1393 Richard Whyttington, Drugo Barentyn
- 1394 Wyllyam Brampton, Thomas Knollys
- 1395 Roger Ellys, Johan Sheryngham
- 1396 Thomas Wylforde, Wylliam Parker
- 1397 William Askham, John Woodcock
- 1398 Johan Wade, Johan Warner
- 1399 William Walderne, William Hyde

=== 15th century ===
Sheriffs of London in the 15th century:

- 1400 Wyllyam Wakele, William Eliot
- 1401 Wylliam Venour, William Fremyngham
- 1402 Richard Marlowe, Robert Chichele
- 1403 Thomas Fauconer, Thomas Poll
- 1404 William Lowste, Stephen Spylman
- 1405 Henry Barton, William Cromer
- 1406 Nycholas Wootton, Godfrey Brooke
- 1407 Henry Pomfret, Henry Hatton
- 1408 Thomas Duke, William Norton
- 1409 John Lawe, William Chycheley, John Reynwell
- 1410 John Penne, Thomas Pyke
- 1411 John Reynwell, William Cotton
- 1412 Rauf Levenham, William Sevenoke
- 1413 John Sutton, John Michell
- 1414 John Mychell, Thomas Aleyn
- 1415 Aleyn Everard, Thomas Cambridge
- 1416 Robert Whityngdon, John Coventry
- 1417 Henry Rede, John Gedney
- 1418 John Bryan, drowned and replaced by J. Parnasse, Rauf. Barton
- 1419 Robert Whytingham, John Butler
- 1420 Johan Boteler, William Welles
- 1421 Richard Gosselyn, William Weston
- 1422 William Eastfeld, Robert Tatersale
- 1423 Nycholas James, Thomas Wadeforde
- 1424 Symon Seman, John Bywater
- 1425 Wylliam Mylred, John Brokley
- 1426 John Arnold, Johan Highman
- 1427 Henry Frowick, Robert Ottele
- 1428 Thomas Duffhouse, Rauffe Holand
- 1429 Johan Ruse, Rauffe Holand
- 1430 Water Chertsey, Robert Large
- 1431 John Atherley, Stephen Browne
- 1432 John Olney, Johan Paddysley
- 1433 Thomas Chalton, Johan Lynge
- 1434 Thomas Bernwell, Simon Eyre
- 1435 Thomas Chatworth, Robert Clopton
- 1436 Thomas Marsted, William Gregory
- 1437 Wylliam Chapman, Wylliam Halys
- 1438 Hugh Dyke, Nicholas Yeo
- 1439 Robert Markhall, Phylyp Malpas
- 1440 John Sutton, William Whetenhall
- 1441 William Cumbys, Richard Ryche
- 1442 Thomas Beaumont, Richard Nordon
- 1443 Nicholas Wyfold, Johan Norman
- 1444 Stephen Foster, Hugh Wyche
- 1445 John Derby, Geoffrey Fielding
- 1446 Robert Horne, Geoffrey Boleyn
- 1447 Wylliam Abraham, Thomas Scot
- 1448 Wylliam Cantlow, William Marlowe
- 1449 William Hewlyn, Thomas Canynges
- 1450 John Mydylton, Wyllyam Dere
- 1451 Matthew Philip, Christofer Marton
- 1452 Richard Leigh, Richarde Alley
- 1453 Johan Walden, Thomas Cooke
- 1454 Johan Felde, William Taillour
- 1455 John Yonge, Thomas Oulgrave
- 1456 Johan Steward, Ralph Verney
- 1457 Wyllyam Edward, Thomas Reyner
- 1458 Ralph Josselyn, Richard Nedeham
- 1459 Johan Plummer, Wyllyam Stocker
- 1460 Rychard Hemynge, Johan Lambarde
- 1461 John Lok, George Irelande
- 1462 William Hampton, Bartholomew James
- 1463 Robert Basset, Thomas Muschamp
- 1464 John Tate, Johan Stone
- 1465 Sir Henry Wavyr, James Constantyne
- 1466 Johan Brown, Henry Bryce, died and replaced by John Stockton
- 1467 Humphrey Heyford, Thomas Stalbroke
- 1468 William Heriot, Symond de Smyth
- 1469 Robert Drope, Richard Gardyner
- 1470 John Crosby, John Warde
- 1471 John Alleyn, John Shelley
- 1472 John Browne, Thomas Bledlow
- 1473 William Stoker, Robert Billesdon
- 1474 Edmund Shaa, Thomas Hill
- 1475 Hugh Bryce, Robert Colwych
- 1476 Richard Rawson, William Horne
- 1477 John Stocker, Henry Colet
- 1478 Robert Hardynge, Robert Byfelde
- 1479 Thomas Ilam, John Warde
- 1480 William Danyell, William Bacon
- 1481 Robert Tate, William Wyking, Richard Chawrey
- 1482 William White, John Mathew
- 1483 Thomas Norlond, William Martyn
- 1484 Richard Chestir, Thomas Bretayn, Ralph Astrie
- 1485 Robert Tate, John Tate
- 1486 Hugh Clopton, John Percival
- 1487 Johan Fenkyll, William Remyngton
- 1488 William Isaak, Rauf Tilney
- 1489 William Capel, John Brooke
- 1490 Henry Coote, Robert Revell, Hugh Pemberton
- 1491 Thomas Wood, William Browne
- 1492 William Purchas, William Walbek
- 1493 Robert Fabyan, John Wyngar
- 1494 Nicholas Ailwyn, Johan Warner
- 1495 Thomas Kneesworth, Henry Somyr
- 1496 John Shaa, Richard Haddon
- 1497 Bartholomew Reade, Thomas Wyndowght
- 1498 Thomas Bradbury, Stephen Jenyns
- 1499 James Wilforde, Rychard Brond

=== 16th century ===
Sheriffs of London in the 16th century:

- 1501 Johan Hawys, William Stede
- 1502 Sir Lawrence Aylmer, Henry Hede
- 1503 Henry Keble, Nycholas Nynes
- 1504 Christopher Hawys, Robert Wattes, Thomas Granger
- 1505 Roger Achylly, William Browne
- 1506 Richard Shore, Roger Grove, George Monoux
- 1507 William Copinger, Thomas Johnston, William Fitzwilliam, William Butler
- 1508 William Butler, Johan Kirkby
- 1509 Thomas Exmewe, Rychard Smyth
- 1510 George Monoux, John Doget
- 1511 John Milborne, John Rest
- 1512 Nicholas Skelton, Thomas Mirfyn
- 1513 Robert Aldarnes, Robert Fenrother
- 1514 John Dawes, John Brydges, Roger Bafford
- 1515 James Yarford, John Monday
- 1516 Henry Warley, Richard Grey, William Bailey
- 1517 Thomas Seymour, John Thurston
- 1518 Thomas Baldrie, Ralph Simonds
- 1519 John Alleyn, James Spencer
- 1520 John Wilkinson, Nicholas Patrich
- 1521 Sir John Skevington, John Kyme, Ralph Warren
- 1522 John Breton, Thomas Pargiter, William Holles
- 1523 John Rudston, John Champneys
- 1524 Michael English, Nicholas Jenyns
- 1525 Ralph Dodmer, William Roche
- 1526 John Caunton, Christopher Askew
- 1527 Stephen Peacock, Nicholas Lombard
- 1528 John Hardy, William Holles
- 1529 Ralph Warren, John Long
- 1530 Michael Dormer, Walter Champion
- 1531 William Dauntsey, Richard Champion
- 1532 Richard Gresham, Edward Altham
- 1533 Richard Reynolds, Nicholas Pinchon, John Martin, John Priest
- 1534 William Forman, Sir Thomas Kitson
- 1535 Nicholas Leveson, William Denham
- 1536 Humfrey Munmoth, John Coates
- 1537 Robert Paget, William Bowyer
- 1538 Sir John Gresham, Thomas Lewen
- 1539 William Wilkinson, Nicholas Gibson
- 1540 John Feiry, Thomas Huntlow
- 1541 William Laxton, Sir Martin Bowes
- 1542 Rowland Hill, Henry Suckley
- 1543 Henry Huberthorn, Henry Amcotes
- 1544 John Tolous, Richard Dobbs
- 1545 John Wilford, Andrew Judde
- 1546 George Barne, Ralph Alleyn
- 1547 Richard Jarveis, Thomas Curtis
- 1548 Thomas White, Robert Charse
- 1549 William Lok (grandson of John Lok, HS 1461), Sir John Ailife
- 1550 Richard Turke, John Yorke, Sir John Lyon or Lyons
- 1551 Augustine Hind,
- 1552 John Lambert, John Cowper
- 1553 William Gerard, John Maynard
- 1554 Thomas Offley, William Hewett
- 1555 David Woodroffe, William Chester
- 1556 Thomas Leigh, John Machell
- 1557 William Harpur, John Whyte
- 1558 Richard Mallory, James Altham
- 1559 John Halse, Richard Champion
- 1560 Thomas Lodge, Roger Martyn
- 1561 Christopher Draper, Thomas Rowe
- 1562 Alexander Avenon, Humphrey Baskervile
- 1563 William Allen, Richard Chamberlaine
- 1564 Edward Bankes, Rowland Hayward
- 1565 Edward Jakeman, Lionel Duckett
- 1566 John Rivers, James Hawes
- 1567 Richard Lambert, Ambrose Nicholas, John Langley
- 1568 Thomas Ramsey, William Bond
- 1569 John Oleph, Robert Harding, James Bacon
- 1570 Henry Becher, William Dane
- 1571 Frances Barnham, William Box
- 1572 Henry Miles, John Branche
- 1573 Richard Pype, Nicholas Woodroffe (son of David Woodroffe, HS 1554)
- 1574 James Harvey, Thomas Pullyson
- 1575 Thomas Blanke, Anthony Gamage
- 1576 Edward Osborne, Wolstan Dixie, George Barne
- 1577 William Kimpton, George Barne
- 1578 Nicholas Backhouse, Francis Bowyer
- 1579 George Bond (brother of William Bond, HS 1567), Thomas Starkie
- 1580 Martin Calthorpe, John Harte
- 1581 Ralph Woodcock, John Allot
- 1582 Richard Martin, William Webbe
- 1583 William Rowe, John Hayden, Cuthbert Buckell
- 1584 William Masham, John Spencer
- 1585 Stephen Slaney, Henry Billingsley
- 1586 Anthony Radclife, Henry Parnell
- 1587 Robert House, William Elkin
- 1588 Thomas Skinner, John Ketcher
- 1589 Hugh Ofley, Richard Saltonstall, Thomas Cambell
- 1590 Richard Gurney, Stephen Soame
- 1591 Nicholas Mosley, Robert Broke
- 1592 William Ryder, Bennet Barnham (son of Francis, Sheriff 1571), Robert Taylor
- 1593 John Garrard, Robert Taylor
- 1594 Paul Banning, Peter Hanton
- 1595 Robert Lee, Thomas Bennett, Thomas Lowe
- 1596 Thomas Lowe, Leonard Halliday, John Watts, Henry Rowe
- 1597 John Watts, Richard Godard, William Craven
- 1598 Henry Rowe, John More
- 1599 Edward Holmeden, Robert Hampson

=== 17th century ===
Sheriffs of London in the 17th century:

- 1600 Humphrey Weld, Roger Clarke
- 1601 Thomas Cambell, Thomas Smith, William Craven
- 1602 Henry Anderson, William Glover
- 1603 Sir James Pemberton, Sir John Swynnerton
- 1604 Sir William Romney, Sir Thomas Myddelton
- 1605 Sir Thomas Hayes, Sir Roger Jones
- 1606 Oliver Style (Jul–Nov), Sir Clement Scudamore, Sir John Jolles
- 1607 William Walthall, John Leman
- 1608 Geffrey Elwes, Nicholas Style
- 1609 George Bolles, Richard Farrington
- 1610 Sebastian Harvey, William Cockayne
- 1611 Richard Pyott, Francis Jones
- 1612 Edward Barkham, George Smithes
- 1613 Edward Rotherham, Alexander Prescot
- 1614 Thomas Bennet, Henry Jaye
- 1615 Peter Probie, Martin Lumley
- 1616 William Gore, John Gore
- 1617 Allan Cotton, Cuthbert Hacket
- 1618 William Holyday, Robert Johnson
- 1619 Richard Hearne, Hugh Hamersley
- 1620 Richard Deane, James Cambell
- 1621 Edward Allen, Robert Ducie
- 1622 George Whitmore, Nicholas Rainton
- 1623 John Hodges, Humfrey Hanford
- 1624 Ralph Freeman, Thomas Moulson, Robert Parkhurst, Christopher Clitherow
- 1625 Rowland Heylyn, Robert Parkhurst
- 1626 Thomas Westway, Ellis Crispe, John Poole, Christopher Clitherow
- 1627 Edward Bromfield, Richard Venn aka Fenne
- 1628 Maurice Abbot, Henry Garraway
- 1629 Rowland Backhouse, William Acton, Thomas Adams
- 1630 Humphrey Smith, Sir Edmund Wright
- 1631 Anthony Abdy, Robert Cambell
- 1632 Samuel Cranmer, Henry Prat
- 1633 Hugh Perry, Henry Andrews
- 1634 Gilbert Harrison, Richard Gurney
- 1635 John Highlord, John Cordall
- 1636 Thomas Soame, John Gayre
- 1637 William Abell, Jacob Garrard, 1st Baronet
- 1638 Thomas Atkins, Edward Rudge
- 1639 Isaac Penington, John Wollaston
- 1640 Thomas Adams, John Warner
- 1641 John Towse, Abraham Reynardson
- 1642 George Garret, George Clarke
- 1643 John Langham, Thomas Andrewes
- 1644 John Fowke, James Bunce
- 1645 William Gibbs, Richard Chambers
- 1646 John Kendricke, Thomas Foote
- 1647 Thomas Cullum, Simond Edmonds
- 1648 Samuel Avery, John Bide
- 1649 Thomas Vyner, Richard Browne
- 1650 Christopher Pack, Rowland Wilson, John Dethick
- 1651 Robert Tichborne, Richard Chiverton
- 1652 John Ireton, Andrew Riccard
- 1653 Stephen Eastwick, William Underwood
- 1654 James Philips, Walter Bigg
- 1655 Edmund Sleigh, Thomas Allen
- 1656 William Thompson, John Frederick
- 1657 Tempest Milner, Nathanael Temse
- 1658 John Robinson, T. Chandler, R. King
- 1659 Anthony Bateman, John Lawrence
- 1660 Francis Warner, William Love
- 1661 Sir William Bolton, Sir William Peake
- 1662 Francis Minell, Samuel Starling
- 1663 Sir Thomas Bludworth, Sir Willam Turner
- 1664 Sir Richard Ford, Sir Richard Reeves
- 1665 Sir George Waterman, Sir Charles Doe
- 1666 Sir Robert Hanson, Sir William Hooker
- 1667 Sir Robert Viner, Sir Joseph Sheldon
- 1668 Sir Dennis Gauden, Sir Thomas Davis
- 1669 John Forth, Sir Francis Chaplin
- 1670 Sir John Smith, Sir James Edwards
- 1671 Samuel Ford, Patience Ward
- 1672 Sir Jonathan Dawes, Sir Robert Clayton, Sir John Moore
- 1673 Sir William Pritchard, Sir James Smith
- 1674 Sir Henry Tulse, Sir Robert Geffrye
- 1675 Sir Nathaniel Herne, Sir John Lethieullier
- 1676 Sir Thomas Gould, Sir John Shorter
- 1677 Sir John Peake, Sir Thomas Stampe
- 1678 Sir Thomas Rawstern, Sir Thomas Beckford
- 1679 Richard How, John Chapman
- 1680 Sir Jonathan Raymond, Sir Simon Lewis
- 1681 Slingsby Bethel, Henry Cornish
- 1682 Thomas Pilkington, Samuel Shute
- 1683 Sir Dudley North, Sir Peter Rich of Southwark
- 1684 Peter Daniel of Clapham, Samuel Dashwood of Bishopgate
- 1685 Sir William Gostlyn, Sir Peter (or Benjamin) Vandeput
- 1686 Sir Benjamin Thorowgood, Sir Thomas Kensey
- 1687 Sir Thomas Rawlinson, Sir Thomas Fowles
- 1688 Sir Basil Firebrace, Sir John Parsons
- 1689 Sir Humphrey Edwin, Sir John Fleet
- 1690 Sir Christopher Lethieullier, Sir John Houblon
- 1691 Sir Edward Clarke, Sir Francis Child
- 1692 Sir William Ashhurst, Sir Richard Levett
- 1693 Sir Thomas Lane, Sir Thomas Cooke
- 1694 Sir Thomas Abney, Sir William Hedges
- 1695 Sir John Sweetapple, Sir William Cole
- 1696 Sir Edward Wills, Sir Owen Buckingham
- 1697 Sir John Woolfe, Sir Samuel Blewitt
- 1698 Sir Bartholemew Gracedieu, Sir James Collett
- 1699 Sir William Gore, Sir Joseph Smart

=== 18th century ===
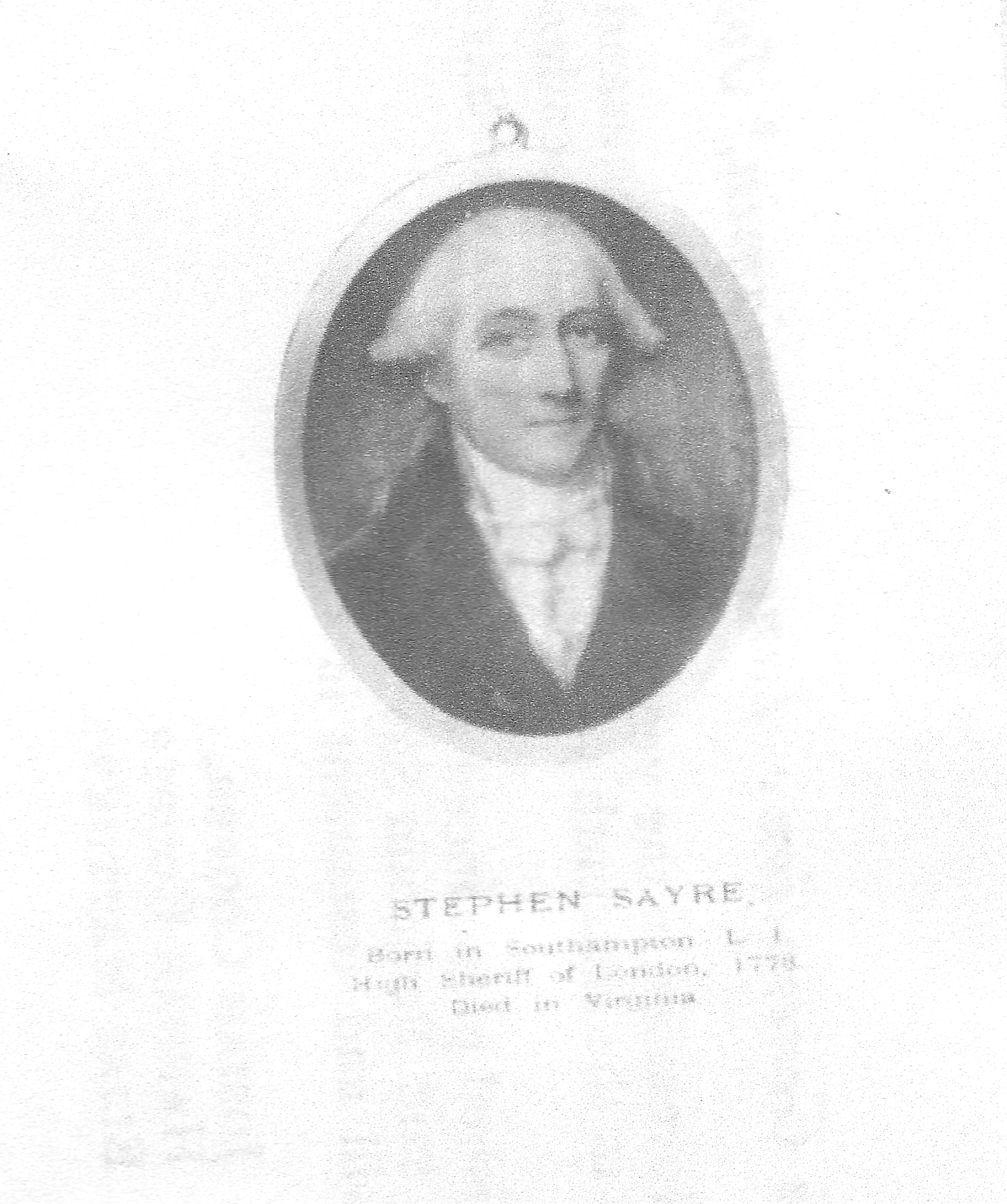
Stephen Sayre, Sheriff of the City of London 1773

Sheriffs of London in the 18th century:

- 1700 Sir Charles Duncombe, Sir Jeffery Jefferies
- 1700 Sir Robert Beachcroft, Sir Henry Furnese
- 1701 Sir William Withers, Sir Peter Floyer (died in office), Sir James Bateman
- 1702 Sir Robert Bedingfeld, Sir Samuel Garrard, 4th Baronet
- 1703 Sir Gilbert Heathcote, Sir Joseph Woolfe
- 1704 Sir John Buckworth, 1st Baronet, Sir William Humphreys
- 1705 Sir Charles Thorold, Sir Samuel Stanier
- 1706 Sir William Benson, Sir Ambrose Crowley
- 1707 Sir Benjamin Green, Sir Charles Peers
- 1708 Sir Charles Hobson, Sir Richard Guy
- 1709 Sir Richard Hoare, Sir Thomas Dunk
- 1710 Sir George Thorold, Sir Francis Eyles
- 1711 Sir John Cass, Sir William Stewart
- 1712 Sir William Lewen of Ewell, Sir Samuel Clarke
- 1713 Sir Francis Forbes, Sir Joshua Sharpe
- 1714 Sir Robert Breedon, Sir Randolph Knipe
- 1715 Sir John Ward, Sir John Fryer
- 1716 Sir Gerard Conyers, Sir Charles Cooke
- 1717 Sir Peter Delmé, Sir Harcourt Master
- 1718 Sir John Bull, Sir Thomas Ambrose
- 1719 Sir John Eyles, Sir John Tash
- 1720 Sir George Caswall, Sir William Billers
- 1721 Sir George Merttins, Sir Edward Beecher
- 1722 Humphry Parsons, Sir Francis Child
- 1723 Sir Richard Hopkins, Sir Felix Feast (died in office and replaced by Sir Edward Bellamy)
- 1724 Sir Robert Baylis, Sir Joseph Eyles
- 1725 Sir Francis Porten, Sir Jeremiah Murden, Sir John Thompson
- 1726 Sir John Lock, Sir William Ogbourn
- 1727 Sir John Grosvenor, Sir Thomas Lombe
- 1728 Sir Richard Brocas, Richard Levett
- 1729 John Barber, Sir John Williams
- 1730 John Fuller, Sir Isaac Shard
- 1731 Samuel Russel, Thomas Pindar
- 1732 Robert Alsop, Sir Henry Hankey
- 1733 Rob. Westley, Daniel Lambert
- 1734 Micajah Perry, Sir John Salter
- 1735 Sir John Barnard, Sir Robert Godschall
- 1736 Sir William Rous, Benjamin Rawlings
- 1737 Sir George Champion, Thomas Russel (died in office and replaced by Sir Robert Kendal Carter)
- 1738 James Brooke, William Westbrooke
- 1739 George Heathcote, Sir John Lequesne
- 1740 Henry Marshall, Richard Hoare
- 1741 Robert Willimot, William Smith
- 1742 William Benn, Charles Eggleton
- 1743 Sir Robert Ladbroke, Sir William Calvert
- 1744 Walter Bernard, Sir Samuel Pennant
- 1745 John Blachford, Francis Cokayne
- 1746 Thomas Winterbottom, Robert Alsop
- 1747 Sir Crisp Gascoyne, Edward Davies
- 1748 Edward Ironside, Sir Thomas Rawlinson
- 1749 W. Whitaker, Sir Stephen Janssen, 4th Baronet
- 1750 William Alexander, Robert Scott
- 1751 Slingsby Bethell, Marshe Dickinson
- 1752 Sir Charles Asgill, Sir Richard Glyn
- 1753 Sir Thomas Chitty, Sir Matthew Blakiston
- 1754 Sir Samuel Fludyer, Sir John Torriano
- 1755 William Beckford, Ive Whitbread
- 1756 William Bridgen, William Stephenson
- 1757 George Nelson, Francis Gosling
- 1758 Alexander Master, James Dandridge
- 1759 George Errington, Paul Vaillant
- 1760 Sir Robert Kite, Sir William Hart
- 1761 Sir Nathaniel Nash, Sir John Cartwright
- 1762 Sir Thomas Challenor, Sir Henry Bankes
- 1763 Thomas Harley, Richard Blunt, Samuel Turner
- 1764 Sir Thomas Harris, Brass Crosby
- 1765 Brackley Kennett, Benjamin Charlwood, Barlow Trecothick
- 1766 Sir Robert Darling, Sir James Esdaile
- 1767 Richard Peers, William Nash
- 1768 Thomas Hallifax, John Shakespear
- 1769 James Townsend, John Sawbridge
- 1770 William Baker, Joseph Martin
- 1771 John Wilkes, Frederick Bull
- 1772 Richard Oliver, Sir Watkin Lewes
- 1773 Stephen Sayre, Sir William Plomer (resigned and replaced by William Lee)
- 1774 Sir William Plomer, John Hart, Nathaniel Newham
- 1775 Nathaniel Newnham, George Hayley
- 1776 Samuel Plumbe, Nathaniel Thomas
- 1777 Richard Clark, Robert Peckham
- 1778 John Burnell, Henry Kitchen
- 1779 Thomas Wright, Evan Pugh
- 1780 Thomas Sainsbury, William Crichton
- 1781 William Gill, William Nicholson, Thomas Skinner
- 1782 Sir Robert Taylor, Benjamin Cole
- 1783 Sir Barnard Turner (died in office 1784), William Pickitt, Thomas Skinner
- 1784 John Boydell, John Hopkins, John Bates
- 1785 Sir James Sanderson, Kt later Sir James Sanderson, 1st Baronet, Brook Watson
- 1786 Paul Le Mesurier Charles Higgins
- 1787 James Fenn, Matthew Bloxham
- 1788 William Curtis, Sir Benjamin Hammet of Taunton, Somerset, John Newman
- 1789 William Newman, Thomas Baker
- 1790 Sir Richard Carr Glyn, later Sir Richard Glyn, 1st Baronet, of Gaunt's House, Sir John Anderson, George Mackenzie Macauley
- 1791 John William Anderson, Harvey Christian Combe
- 1792 Alexander Brander, Sir Benjamin Tibbs, Kt
- 1793 Peter Perchard, Charles Hammerton
- 1794 Sir John Eamer, Sir Robert Burnett
- 1795 Sir Richard Glode, John Liptrap
- 1796 Sir Stephen Langston, Sir William Staines
- 1797 Sir William Herne, Robert Williams
- 1798 William Champion, Peter Mellish, Sir Charles Price
- 1799 Charles Flower, John Blackwall

=== 19th century ===
- 1800 Thomas Cadell, John Perring
- 1801 William Rawlins, Robert Albion Cox
- 1802 Sir Richard Walsh, Sir James Alexander
- 1803 Sir James Shaw, Sir William Leighton
- 1804 Sir William Domville, George Scholey
- 1805 Thomas Smith, John Ansley
- 1806 Sir James Brancombe, Sir Jonathan Miles
- 1807 Sir Richard Phillips, Christopher Smith
- 1808 Sir Claudius Hunter, Joshua Jonathan Smith
- 1809 Matthew Wood, John Atkins, Sir Barnard Turner
- 1810 Sir William Plomer, Samuel Goodbehere
- 1811 Samuel Birch, William Heygate
- 1812 Sir Michael Hoy, John Blades
- 1813 Christopher Magnay, Thomas Coxhead Marsh
- 1814 Joseph Leigh, John Reay
- 1815 Thomas Bell, John Thomas Thorp
- 1816 George Bridges, Robert Kirby
- 1817 Sir George Alderson, Francis Desanges
- 1818 Thomas Roberts, Lawrence Gwynne
- 1819 Joseph Wilfred Parkins, Richard Rothwell
- 1820 Robert Waithman, James Williams
- 1821 William Venables, John Garrett
- 1822 William Thompson, Matthias Prime Lucas
- 1823 Sir Peter Laurie, George Byrom Whittaker
- 1824 Sir John Key, 1st Baronet, Anthony Brown
- 1825 Thomas Kelly, John Crowder
- 1826 Charles Farebrother, Henry Winchester
- 1827 Andrew Spottiswoode, Charles Stable
- 1828 William Taylor Copeland, Sir Felix Booth, 1st Baronet
- 1829 William Henry Richardson, Mr Ward
- 1830 Sir Chapman Marshall, William Henry Poland
- 1831 Sir John Pirie, 1st Baronet John Cowan
- 1832 John Humphrey, Richard Peek
- 1833 Samuel Wilson, James Harmer
- 1834 Alexander Raphael, John Illidge
- 1835 Sir David Salomons John Lainson
- 1836 Sir James Duke, John Johnson
- 1837 Sir George Carroll, Moses Montefiore
- 1838 Thomas Wood, Thomas Johnson
- 1839 William Evans, John Wheelton
- 1840 Thomas Farncomb, Michael Gibbs
- 1841 William Magnay, Alexander Rogers
- 1842 William Hunter, John Kinnersley Hooper
- 1843 Sir Francis Moon, Sir John Musgrove
- 1844 Sir Thomas Sidney, William Hunter
- 1845 Sir John Laurie, William James Chaplin
- 1846 Thomas Challis, Robert William Kennard
- 1847 William Cubitt, Charles Hill
- 1848 Thomas Quested Finnis, Jacob Emanuel Goodheart
- 1849 William Lawrence, Donald Nicoll
- 1850 Sir Robert Walter Carden, George Edmund Hodgkinson
- 1851 Richard Swift, Thomas Cottkrell
- 1852 John Carter, Alexander Angus Croll
- 1853 George Appleton Wallis David Williams Wire
- 1854 Sir Henry Muggeridge Charles Decimus Crosley
- 1855 William Anderson Rose, Robert Hartley Kennedy
- 1856 John Joseph Mechi, Frederick Keats
- 1857 Sir William Lawrence (son of Wm Lawrence, HS 1849), William Ferneley Allen
- 1858 Warren Stormes Hale, Edward Conder
- 1859 Sir Thomas Gabriel, Benjamin Samuel
- 1860 Sir Andrew Lusk, James Abbiss
- 1861 George Joseph Cockerell, William Holme Twentyman
- 1862 Sir James Clarke Lawrence, Hugh Jones
- 1863 Thomas Cave Hilary Nicholas Nissen
- 1864 Sir Thomas Dakin, Robert Besley
- 1865 James Figgins, Sills John Gibbons
- 1866 Sir Sydney Hedley Waterlow, 1st Baronet, Francis Lycett
- 1867 Sir William McArthur, David Henry Stone
- 1868 William Cotton, Charles William Cookworthy Hutton
- 1869 Sir Joseph Causton, Sir James Vallentin
- 1870 Sir Thomas Scambler Owden, John Paterson
- 1871 Sir Francis Wyatt Truscott, John Bennett
- 1872 Sir Thomas White Alderman Richard Young Young died within a few days and was succeeded by Sir John Bennett
- 1873 Sir Charles Whetham, John Henry Johnson
- 1874 Sir John Whittaker Ellis, James Shaw
- 1875 Sir Henry Edmund Knight, Edgar Breffit
- 1876 Simeon Charles Hadley, William Quartermaine East
- 1877 Sir John Staples, George Swan Nottage
- 1878 George Burt, Thomas Bevan
- 1879 Charles Woolloton, Esq.,Henry Kelly Bayley, Esq.
- 1880 Sir Robert Fowler, 1st Baronet, Herbert Jameson Waterlow
- 1881 Sir Reginald Hanson, William Anderson Ogg
- 1882 Polydore de Keyser, Sir Joseph Savory, 1st Baronet
- 1883 Phineas Cowan, Clarence Smith
- 1884 Sir George Faudel-Phillips,Sir James Whitehead
- 1885 Sir David Evans, Thomas Clarke
- 1886 Sir Henry Aaron Isaacs, Lt Col Sir Alfred Kirby
- 1887 Sir Horatio Davies, William Alpheus Higgs
- 1888 Sir Alfred James Newton, Edward James Gray

== Sheriffs of the City of London ==
=== 19th century ===
- 1889 Sir Stuart Knill, Sir Walter Henry Harris
- 1890 Sir William Farmer, Sir Augustus Glossop Harris
- 1891 Harry Seymour Foster, Sir George Robert Tyler
- 1892 Sir Joseph Renals, Sir Walter Henry Wilkin
- 1893 Sir Joseph Cockfield Dimsdale, John Voce Moore
- 1894 Sir Marcus Samuel, George Hand
- 1895 John Robert Cooper, Sir John Pound, 1st Baronet
- 1896 James T. Ritchie, Sir Robert Rogers
- 1897 Frank Green, Thomas Robert Dewar
- 1898 Sir Frederick Alliston, Colonel Clifford Probyn
- 1899 Sir William Purdie Treloar Sir Alfred Henry Bevan

=== 20th century ===
- 1900 Walter Vaughan Morgan, Joseph Lawrence
- 1901 Sir John Charles Bell, Horace Brooks Marshall
- 1902 Sir George Wyatt Truscott, 1st Baronet, Sir Thomas Henry Brooke-Hitching
- 1903 Sir John Knill, 2nd Baronet, Sir Alfred James Reynolds
- 1904 Thomas Vezey Strong George Joseph Woodman
- 1905 Sir Henry George Smallman, Sir Vansittart Bowater, 1st Baronet,
- 1906 Sir William Dunn, Sir Thomas Boor Crosby
- 1907 Charles Cheers Wakefield, Sir David Burnett, 1st Baronet
- 1908 Sir John Baddeley, Francis Stanhope Hanson
- 1909 James Roll, Ralph Slazenger
- 1910 Sir Charles Johnston, Henry Cecil Buckingham
- 1911 Charles Augustus Hanson, George Briggs
- 1912 Edward Ernest Cooper, Alfred Louis Bower
- 1913 Lt-Col John Humphery, Frederick George Painter
- 1914 Edward Cecil Moore, Reverend Henry Cart de La Fontaine
- 1915 George Alexander Touche, Samuel George Shead
- 1916 Sir George Haysom, Major Lewis Arthur Newton
- 1917 Rowland Blades, Henry Frankland Hepburn
- 1918 Colonel William Robert Smith, Bannister Flight Fletcher
- 1919 Curtis George Ashdown, Charles Eves
- 1920 Sidney Wishart, Henry Newton Knights
- 1921 Harold John de Courcy Moore, George Mills McKay
- 1922 Stephen Henry Molyneux Killik, John Edward Kynaston Studd
- 1923 Thomas Middleton Dron, Sir Richard Christopher Sennett
- 1924 Frederick James Barthorpe, Harold George Downer
- 1925 Charles Batho, Francis Agar
- 1926 Harry Percy Shepherd, Percy Vincent
- 1927 Henry E Davenport, Frederick Daniel Green
- 1928 Sir William Alfred Waterlow, William George Coxen
- 1929 Frank Henry Bowater, William Phené Neal
- 1930 Maurice Jenks, Daniel George Collins
- 1931 Percy Walter Greenaway, George Henry Wilkinson
- 1932 Charles Henry Collett, William Lacon Threlford
- 1933 Isadore Nathan Jacobs, Samuel George Joseph Jacobs resigned, Sir George Broadbridge elected in his place 10 October 1933
- 1934 Harry Augustus Edward Twyford, John Slocombe Pearse
- 1935 Lieutenant-Colonel John Dawson Laurie, Colonel William James Waldron
- 1936 Frank Joseph Pollitzer, Charles James Hugh McRea
- 1937 Richard William Eaton, William Henry Champness
- 1938 Frederick Rowland, George Godfrey Warr
- 1939 Frank Newson-Smith, Denys Colquhoun Flowerdew Lowson
- 1940 Frank Samuel Alexander, George Percy Trentham Trentham was killed in an air raid, December 1940 Horace Boot was elected in his place 18 December 1940.
- 1941 Sir Howard Button, Rupert de la Bère
- 1942 Colonel Charles Arthur Davis, Robert Roy Scott Hewett
- 1943 Bracewell Smith MP, Gervase Wood
- 1944 Harold Walter Seymour Howard, Septimus Marshall
- 1945 Frederick Tidbury Beer, Frederick Michael Wells
- 1946 Sir George Aylwen, Charles Gordon Dickson
- 1947 Sir Leslie Boyce, Richard Christmas Hammett
- 1948 Sir Noël Vansittart Bowater, Major Thomas Guy Fenton Richardson
- 1949 Cuthbert Lowell Ackroyd, Major Stanley Walter Wells
- 1950 Lieutenant-Colonel George James Cullum Welch, Percy Lovely
- 1951 Denis Henry Truscott, Clement James Harman
- 1952 Sydney Harold Gillett, Sidney Joseph Fox
- 1953 Edmund Stockdale, Norman Tremellen
- 1954 Edward Calcott Pryce, Leslie Barnett Prince
- 1955 Bernard Waley-Cohen, William Gilbert Allen
- 1956 Frederick Alfred Hoare, Sir James Miller
- 1957 Anthony George Clifton-Brown, Samuel Richard Walker
- 1958 Ralph Edgar Perring, John Edward Evan-Cook
- 1959 Hubert Pitney, Cyril Derry
- 1960 Richard Home Studholme, Adam Kennedy Kirk
- 1961 Jonathan Lionel Percy Denny, Christopher Selwyn Priestley Rawson
- 1962 Robert Bellinger, Alan Pearce Greenaway
- 1963 Gilbert Samuel Inglefield, Gilbert Harold Samuel Edgar
- 1964 Arthur Harris Ley, Arnold Charles Trinder
- 1965 Ian Frank Bowater, Cyril Sweett
- 1966 Herbert Graham Donovan Toye, Douglas Rowland Holdsworth Hill
  Hill died 16 October 1966, Sir Hamilton Edward de Coucey Howard, Bt elected in his place 27 October 1966.
- 1967 Peter Malden Studd, Lindsay Roberts Ring
- 1968 Lieutenant-Colonel Godfrey Sturdy Incledon-Webber, Kenneth Gordon McNeil
- 1969 Alan Mais, Baron Mais, Richard Theodore Beck
- 1970 Sir Peter Gadsden, Hugh Walter Kingwell Wontner
- 1971 Henry Murray Fox, Neville Rayner
- 1972 G.B.Graham, Henry Wimburn Sudell Horlock
- 1973 Robin Gillett, Cyril Anthony Hart
- 1974 Sire Peter Beckford Rutgers Vanneck, A. Hugh Olson
- 1975 Kenneth Cork, Robert Anthony Ralph Hedderwick
- 1976 Alexander Colin Cole, Alan Seymour Lamboll
- 1977 Michael H. Hinton, Bernard Joseph Brown
- 1978 Kenneth Alfred Ballard, Ronald Gardner-Thorpe
- 1979 Sir Christopher Leaver, John Garrow Maclachan Hart
- 1980 Sir Anthony Jolliffe, David Gilbert Charles Inglefield
- 1981 Dame Mary Donaldson, Anthony Noel Eskenzi
- 1982 Allan Davis, Alan Traill
- 1983 Richard Christopher Larkins Charvet, Rodney Cyril Alban FitzGerald
- 1984 David Rowe-Ham, Greville D. Spratt
- 1985 Christopher Collett, Jack Edward Neary
- 1986 Alexander Graham, Hugh Bidwell
- 1987 Sir Brian Garton Jenkins, Richard Saunders
- 1988 Francis McWilliams, Simon Anthony Allen Block
- 1989 Derek Edwards, Paul Newall
- 1990 Christopher Walford, John A. F. Taylor
- 1991 John Raymond Perring, R. N. Young
- 1992 Sir Roger William Cork, Anthony David Moss
- 1993 Sir John Chalstrey, Jeremy Millard Butler Gotch
- 1994 Richard Nichols, Jonathan Philip Charkham
- 1995 Peter Levene, Kenneth Edwin Ayers
- 1996 Clive Martin, Keith Knowles
- 1997 Sir David Howarth Seymour Howard, Baronet, Michael Oliver
- 1998 Brian Nicholas Harris, Gavyn Arthur
- 1999 Robert Finch, Pauline Halliday

=== 21st century ===
- 2000 Richard Devenish Agutter, Nigel Branson
- 2001 Michael Savory, David Robin Mauleverer
- 2002 Martin Clarke, David Brewer
- 2003 Geoffrey Bond, Nick Anstee
- 2004 David Cobb, John Hughesdon
- 2005 John Stuttard, Kevin Kearney
- 2006 Sir David Lewis, Richard Regan
- 2007 Ian Luder, Michael David Bear
- 2008 Roger Gifford, George Gillon
- 2009 David Wootton, Peter J. Cook
- 2010 Richard Sermon, Fiona Woolf
- 2011 Wendy Mead, Alan Yarrow
- 2012 Jeffrey Evans, Nigel Pullman
- 2013 Sir Paul Judge, Robert Adrian Joseph Waddingham
- 2014 Fiona Josephine Adler, Dr Andrew Parmley
- 2015 Dr Christine Rigden, Charles Bowman
- 2016 Peter Estlin, William Russell
- 2017 Tim Hailes, Neil Graham Morgan Redcliffe
- 2018 Vincent Keaveny, Liz Green
- 2019–2020 Professor Michael Mainelli, Christopher Michael Hayward (extended due to COVID-19 pandemic)
- 2021 Alison Gowman, Nicholas Lyons
- 2022 Alastair King, Andrew Marsden
- 2023 Susan Langley, Bronek Masojada
- 2024 Gregory Jones, David Chalk
- 2025 Robert Hughes-Penney, Keith Bottomley

== See also ==
- List of Lord Mayors of London
