= John Knill (disambiguation) =

John Knill (1733–1811), and English lawyer and Collector of Customs at St Ives, Cornwall.

John Knill may also refer to:

- Frank John Knill (fl. 1918), British Marine, winner of the Conspicuous Gallantry Medal
- John Knill (MP) (16th century), English member of parliament for Radnorshire
- Several of the Knill baronets in the county of Kent, England:
  - Sir John Knill, 2nd Baronet (1856–1934), Lord Mayor of London during 1909–1910
  - Sir John Stuart-Knill, 3rd Baronet (1886–1973)
  - Sir John Kenelm Stuart Knill, 4th Baronet (1913–1998)
  - Sir Thomas John Pugin Bartholomew Knill, 5th Baronet (born 1952)
