= Thomas Crosby =

Thomas Crosby may refer to:

- Thomas Crosby (missionary) (1840–1914), English missionary in Canada
- Thomas Crosby (Baptist) (1683–1751), English writer
- Thomas Crosby (lord mayor) (1830–1916), Lord Mayor of London
- Tom Crosby Jr. (1928–2011), American politician
