= John Hare (MP died 1637) =

English politician

Sir John Hare (13 October 1603 – 4 November 1637), of Stow Bardolph, Norfolk, was an English politician.

Hare, the only son of Sir Ralph Hare (c1566-1623) and his first wife Mary, daughter of Edward Holmeden, was born on 13 October 1603. He was knighted on 4 December 1618 at Newmarket, Suffolk.

In 1620 Hare was the co-heir of his great-uncle Hugh Hare, receiving a large bequest along with a cousin, Hugh. Around the same time he married Elizabeth, eldest daughter of Thomas Coventry, then solicitor general and later lord keeper. On the death of his father in 1623 he inherited Stow Bardolph.

Hare was a Member (MP) of the Parliament of England for Aylesbury in 1625, for Evesham in 1626 and for King's Lynn in 1628. His connection with Aylesbury is unknown, his father-in-law presumably influenced his election for Evesham and his own local standing that for King's Lynn. He was not particularly active in Parliament, although he was active in local government and in the militia.

Hare and his wife had a large family, including:

- Sir Ralph Hare, 1st Baronet
- John married Susan, daughter and co-heir of John Walpole esq. of Broomsthorpe, Norfolk
- Nicholas married Catherine, daughter of William Gery of Bushmead Priory, Bedfordshire
- Elizabeth (d. 1699) married 1) Woolley Leigh (d. 1644) of Addington, Surrey & 2) Sir John Lowther of Ackworth, West Yorkshire
- Anne married Sir John Sydenham baronet of Brympton, Somerset
- Mary married Thomas Savage esq. of Elmley Castle, Worcestershire
- Susan married Thomas Barrow
- Sarah married John Earle of Heydon, Norfolk
- Margaret married John Corrance of Rendlesham, Sussex

He died on 4 November 1637. He left most of his lands to his eldest son, Ralph, but his younger sons were all given lands and seven daughters were also provided for. He was buried in the church at Stow Bardolph, Norfolk, where he had erected a memorial chapel for his family in 1624.
