= Henry le Walleis =

English politician

Henry le Walleis (sometimes spelled le Waleys) (died 1302) was a 13th-century English politician and Mayor of London. His origins are obscure; he was an outsider to London and may have been Welsh by birth. After making his fortune in the wine trade, he became an alderman in 1269 and sheriff in 1270. As alderman, he represented the ward of Cordwainer. He went on to serve five terms as mayor.

Henry's career was marked by strong support for King Edward I, whom he served as an advisor. In his first term as mayor, in 1273, Henry acted against prior mayor Walter Hervey, who had led a populist movement that nearly resulted in a revolt coinciding with the death of King Henry III. Walleis had Hervey's sheriffs arrested for corruption and persuaded the aldermen to annul the charters Hervey's movement had fought for, before bringing Hervey himself up on numerous charges for his actions as mayor and bailiff. He was succeeded as mayor by his political ally, Gregory de Rokesley. In 1275, Edward I appointed Henry as mayor of Bordeaux, and Henry also served as a diplomat to both France and Scotland over the next two decades. He also was appointed as one of the planners (along with Thomas Alard) of the city of Winchelsea. Henry returned for three more years as mayor from 1281 to 1283, after years of increasing discontent among the citizens of London. In 1282, he established the Stocks Market, where fishmongers and butchers could sell their wares, with the rents going towards the maintenance of London Bridge. He also, in 1283, had a series of shops built along Paternoster Row which would later become a center of the London publishing trade. In 1298, he was elected to his fifth (and final) term as mayor.

Henry married Joan, daughter of Adam de Basing, a previous mayor of London. His son, Augustine le Waleys (sometimes referred to as Augustine de Uxbridge), served as Warden of the Mint for King Edward II. Henry died in 1302, leaving a significant bequest to the Poor Clares and Franciscans.
