= Venice Company =

English trading company

The Venice Company was an English chartered trading company established in 1583 to monopolise on trade in and around the Venetian colonies in the Mediterranean Sea.

In 1592, the Venice Company merged with the Turkey Company to form the renowned Levant Company, which went on to regulate English and Ottoman trade for the following few centuries until its decline and dissolution in 1825.

== Origins and inception ==
The Venice Company was chartered as a trading company in 1583 by Thomas Cordell, William Garway and Edward Holmden for an initial period of seven years. Its mandate was to exchange English-made goods, usually woollen fabrics, for eastern commodities, especially spices, currants for wine, and silk cloth. Some of the company’s leading members were Paul Bayning, father of Paul Bayning, 1st Viscount Bayning, Thomas Cordell, an alderman and a member of the Mercers’ Company, Edward Holmden and William Garway. The latter two had vast experience in Moroccan commerce, while the others had all been active in Spanish commerce.

== Merger ==
In 1592, upon the expiration of both the charters of the Turkey and Venice Companies, Queen Elizabeth I approved a charter to merge both companies into the Levant Company, as she was anxious to maintain trade and political alliances with the Ottoman Empire. Both Cordell and Bayning transferred to the Levant Company upon its formation.

== See also ==
- Chartered companies
