= Tyler baronets =

Extinct baronetcy in the Baronetage of the United Kingdom

Escutcheon of the Tyler baronets of Queenhithe and Penywern Road

The Tyler Baronetcy, of Queenhithe in the City of London and of Penywern Road in Kensington in the County of London, was a title in the Baronetage of the United Kingdom. It was created on 24 July 1894 for Sir George Tyler, Lord Mayor of London from 1893 to 1894. The title became extinct on the death of the second Baronet in 1907.

== Tyler baronets, of Queenhithe and Penywern Road (1894) ==
- Sir George Robert Tyler, 1st Baronet (1835–1897)
- Sir Frederick Charles Tyler, 2nd Baronet (1865–1907)

Baronetage of the United Kingdom
Preceded by Reckitt baronets	Tyler baronets of Queenhithe and Penywern Road; 24 July 1894	Succeeded by Williams baronets
