= Vezey Strong =

English businessman and Lord Mayor of London

Sir Thomas Vezey Strong (5 October 1857 – 3 October 1920) was an English businessman who was Lord Mayor of London and a Privy Counsellor.

He was born in St Andrew Holborn parish, London, the third son of John Strong. He made his career as a wholesale paper merchant. Strong would say that not only was he born in the City of London, he never left the city.

He became Alderman of Queenhithe in 1897, served as a Sheriff of London in 1904–05 and as Lord Mayor of London in 1910–11. He was invested as a Knight Bachelor in 1905 and made KCVO in 1911.

He was Chairman H.M. Prison Commissioners, Holloway and until 1911 Honorary Colonel of the 1st London Brigade, Royal Field Artillery. He was also Chairman of the London Temperance Hospital from 1899 to his death. He was made a KBE in the 1918 New Year Honours. In 1911, he was made a Privy Counsellor. He promoted the use of Esperanto

In 1900, Strong married Elizabeth "Lillie" Mary, daughter of James Hartnoll, of Ganwic, Potters Bar, Hertfordshire. The Strongs lived at Ganwic, Barnet. They had no children; the engagement of Violet Beatrice Pollard, "adopted daughter of Lady (Vezey) Strong, of Ganwic, Barnet", was announced in The Times in June 1928, and that of John Strong, "adopted son of Lady Vezey Strong", in June 1932. Strong died in 1920 after a long illness; his widow died in 1951.

Political offices
Preceded by Sir John Knill, 2nd Baronet	Lord Mayor of London; 1910–1911	Succeeded by Sir Thomas Crosby
