= Walter Hervey (mayor) =

Medieval Lord Mayor of London

Walter Hervey (died 1283) was a 13th-century English Lord Mayor of London. He was elected mayor in the waning days of the reign of Henry III, while the heir apparent was away on a crusade in the Holy Land. At the time of his election, there was an ongoing rivalry between the common citizens of London and the city's aldermen. The aldermen proposed Philip le Tayllor as the new mayor, but a large portion of the citizenry installed Hervey as mayor over their objections. During his term, Hervey signed charters for the various crafts, in effect creating an early form of trade unions. After his term as mayor was ended, Hervey was succeeded by Henry le Walleis. Walleis, along with his political ally (and eventual successor) Gregory de Rokesley, nullified the charters. Although Hervey attempted to rally his followers to preserve the charters, his efforts were in vain. With royal backing, Henry le Walleis had Hervey formally arraigned on a variety of charges, and ultimately Hervey was hounded out of his office as alderman and forbidden to ever again take part in the governance of the city. After this, there is little record of Walter Hervey, other than that he had a daughter, Anne, who married Thomas Woodchurch.
