= Henry Knight (Lord Mayor) =

British politician

The Right Honourable Sir Henry Edmund Knight
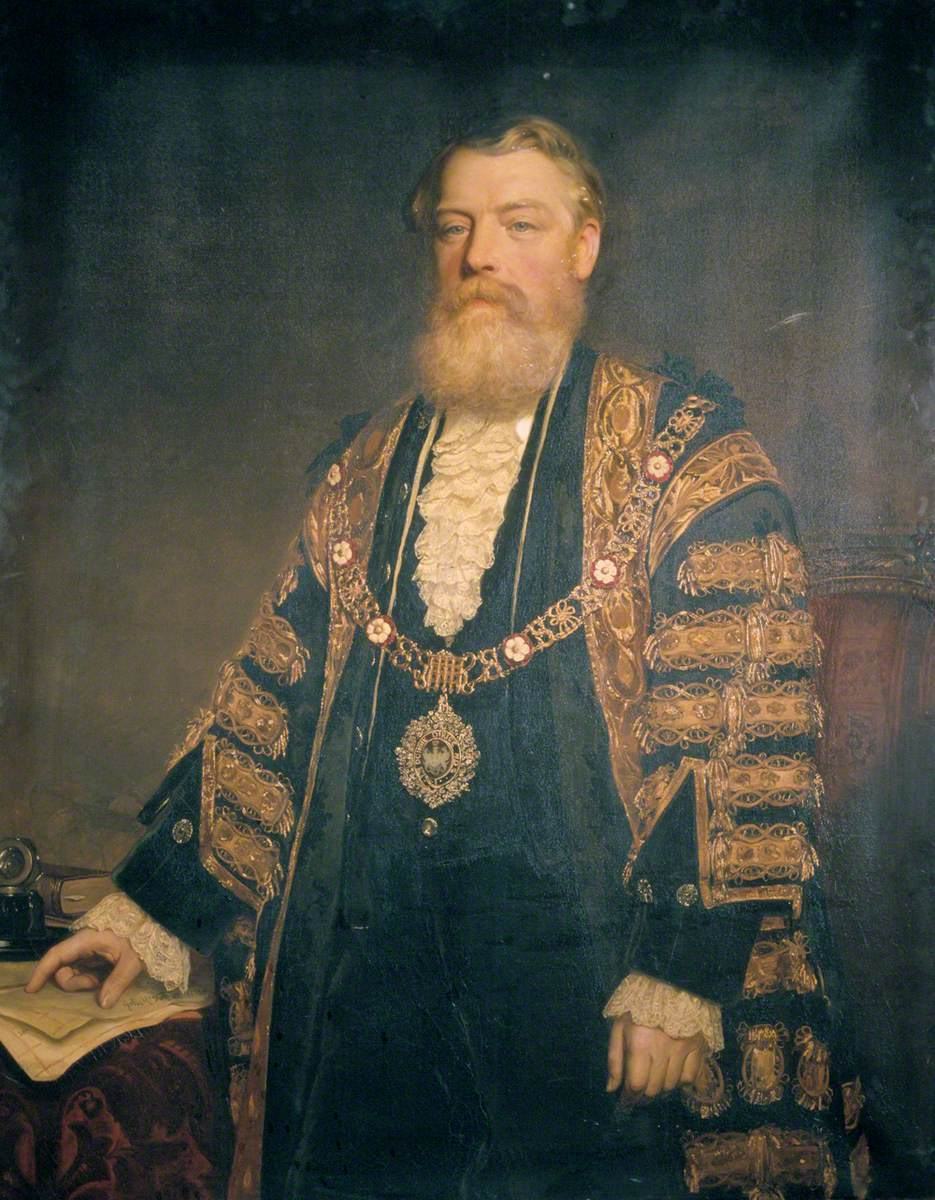
- Henry Knight in 1883

Lord Mayor of London
- In office 9 November 1882 – 9 November 1883
- Preceded by: John Whittaker Ellis
- Succeeded by: Robert Fowler

Alderman of the City of London
- In office 1874 – 21 November 1917
- Preceded by: Thomas Challis
- Succeeded by: John James Baddeley

Sheriff of London and Middlesex
- In office 29 September 1875 – 29 September 1876
- Preceded by: John Bennett; Sir Thomas White
- Succeeded by: Sir John Whetham; Sir Thomas Johnson

Common Councilman of the City of London
- In office 1867–1874

Personal details
- Born: March 25, 1833 Marylebone, London, UK
- Died: November 21, 1917 (aged 84) London, UK
- Resting place: St Mary's Parish Church, Hampton, England
- Profession: Businessman, merchant

Sir Henry Edmund Knight (25 March 1833 – 27 November 1917) was a member of parliament and Lord Mayor of London.

== Biography ==
Henry Edmund Knight was born on 25 March 1833 in Marylebone, London. He was the son of John William Knight. He began his political career in the City of London. As his career influence grew, Knight transitioned into corporate governance. He served for many years as the Chairman of the Southwark and Vauxhall Water Company, one of the major private enterprises supplying water to London. He was also the Chairman of the London Sea Water Supply Company and maintained a long-standing membership with the Worshipful Company of Fishmongers, one of the ancient trade guilds or livery companies of the city.

Knight's civic career began in 1867 when he was elected as a Common Councilman for the Cripplegate Ward within the City of London Corporation. He served in the office until 1874, when he was elevated to the position of Alderman for the same ward following the death of Thomas Challis. Knight would hold this lifetime position until his own death in 1917.

Knight was elected as the Lord Mayor of London on September 29, 1882, and officially assumed office on 9 November 1882.

Knight died at his Hampton residence on 21 November 1917 at the age of 84. He was buried locally at St Mary's Parish Church in Hampton.

Civic offices
Preceded by Thomas Challis	Alderman of the City of London (Cripplegate Ward); 1874–1917	Succeeded by Sir John James Baddeley
Preceded by Sir John Bennett; Sir Thomas White	Sheriff of London and Middlesex; 1875–1876	Succeeded by Sir John Whetham; Sir Thomas Johnson
Preceded by Sir John Whittaker Ellis	Lord Mayor of London; 1882–1883	Succeeded by Sir Robert Fowler
