= John Norman (mayor, fl. 1250) =

Thirteenth century Mayor of London

Arms of John Norman.

John Norman was Sheriff of the City of London, appointed in 1234. He was elected Mayor of London on Michaelmas Day 1250, taking office in November and serving a full one year term.

== Mayorship ==
He was elected Mayor of London on Michaelmas Day, 1250, taking office in early November. His term ended a year later, in early November 1251.

== Coat of Arms ==
According to Burke, Norman's coat of arms is blazoned: Argent on a chief sable three leopards faces or.

== See also ==
- List of Lord Mayors of London
- List of Sheriffs of London
