= Richard Gardiner (politician) =

Former Lord Mayor of London

Sir Richard Gardiner

Lord Mayor of London
- In office 1478–1478
- Preceded by: Humphrey Heyford
- Succeeded by: Bartholomew James

Personal details
- Died: 19 December 1489

Sir Richard Gardiner (died 19 December 1489) was a English politician, elected as the Lord Mayor of London in 1478. He was Alderman of Walbrook Ward, and had been Sheriff of the City of London in 1469. He was also elected in 1478 a Member of Parliament for the City of London, one of the two aldermanic representatives of the city.

== Life and death ==
Gardiner's parents were John and Isabella Gardiner of Exning, near Newmarket, Suffolk. He married Etheldreda (or Audrey) (who died in 1505), the daughter of William Cotton, Lord of the manor of Landwade, in Cambridgeshire, who survived him and married, secondly, Sir Gilbert Talbot, Knight of the Garter, of Grafton, Worcestershire). By Audria, Gardiner had one child, Mary, who in 1504 married Sir Giles Alington, Knt.

Richard Gardiner was a kinsman to Sir William John Gardiner, the man most likely responsible for the killing of Richard III of England during the Battle of Bosworth Field during the Wars of the Roses.

"In his will, Richard Gardener [sic], Alderman of Walbrook Ward, left to Etheldreda or Audria, his wife, his lands, tenements, &c., in the parishes of St.Bartholomew the Less [towards the Royal Exchange], St.Michael Queenhithe, and Holy Trinity the Less, for her life, with remainder to Mary, Lady Alington, his daughter in tail [sic]. In default of an heir he leaves the sum of ten pence 'per diem' to five poor men in honour of the five wounds of Jesus Christ, and to five poor women in honour of the five joys of the Blessed Virgin Mary; the said men and women being nominated by the Mayor and Recorder, and by the Master of the House or Hospital of St.Thomas de Acon, in manner prescribed. The aforesaid tenements &c., to remain to the master of the house or hospital aforesaid and his successors subject to the above charge; remainder in case of default to the Chamberlain of the City of London on like condition. Dated 1 April 1488. Proved on Monday the Feast of St.Alphege, Bishop, 19 April 1490."

== See also ==
- List of Sheriffs of the City of London
- List of Lord Mayors of London
- City of London (elections to the Parliament of England)
