= John Harte (mayor) =

English merchant

Sir John Harte (active 1575 – January 1604) was a 16th-century English merchant who was one of the principal founders of the English East India Company as well as a Lord Mayor of London. He was a native of Kilburn who became a grocer in the city of London. He was elected one of the Sheriffs of London in 1579, serving with future mayor Martin Calthorp, and later elected Lord Mayor of London in 1589. He purchased a large mansion, known as Oxford House, that had once belonged to the Earls of Oxford and later to Lord Mayor Ambrose Nicholas. One of his daughters married Sir George Bolles, a later Lord Mayor of London. Harte died in 1604.

Civic offices
Preceded by Richard Martin	Lord Mayor of London; 1589–1590	Succeeded by John Allot
