= William Taillour =

Member of the Parliament of England

Sir William Taillour

Lord Mayor of London
- In office 1468–1468
- Preceded by: Sir Thomas Walgrave
- Succeeded by: Sir Richard Leigh

Member of the English Parliament for City of London
- In office 1483–1483

Personal details
- Born: 1406
- Died: 1483 (aged 76–77)
- Occupation: Grocer

Sir William Taillour sometimes spelt Taylor or Taylour (1406–1483) was Lord Mayor of London in 1468 (during the reign of Henry VI).

He was a wealthy grocer who served as a Sheriff of London for 1455 and was made an Alderman in 1458. He was knighted on 21 May 1471, (the same day that Henry VI of England died) and elected Member of Parliament for the City of London in 1483 as one of the two aldermanic representatives for the city.

He died in 1483.

== Taylour House, Edenbridge ==
Taylour House in Edenbridge was built for Sir William Taylour, and his coat of arms are in the right spandrel of the entrance door and that of the Grocers company in the left. Formally known as "The Griffin" it has a Jacobean staircase and a number of Jacobean wall paintings.

== See also ==
- List of Sheriffs of London
- List of Lord Mayors of London
- City of London (elections to the Parliament of England)
