= Robert Kite =

Lord Mayor of London
- In office 1766
- Preceded by: George Nelson
- Succeeded by: Thomas Harley

Personal details
- Born: 1708
- Died: 1772 (aged 63–64)

Sir Robert Kite was appointed Sheriff of London for 1761 and Lord Mayor of London for 1766.

== Biography ==
He was knighted on 16 October 1760. He was the last member of the Skinners Company to serve as Lord Mayor until Sir Rupert De la Bère in 1953.

Dates inscribed on his portrait give his birth around 1708 and death circa 1772.

== See also ==
- List of lord mayors of London
- List of sheriffs of London
