= Stuart Knill =

British businessman and politician (1824 – 1898)

Portrait

Sir Stuart Knill, 1st Baronet (11 April 1824 – 19 November 1898) was a London businessman and Lord Mayor of London.

== Biography ==
Knill was born the son of John Knill, of Blackheath, London and succeeded his father as proprietor of Messrs. John Knill and Co., wharfingers and warehouse-keepers, of London Bridge.

His step-sister was Jane Knill, who became the third wife of the architect Augustus Pugin.

In 1885, Knill was elected Alderman for the ward of Bridge Within, became Sheriff of the City of London for 1889–90 and Lord Mayor of London for 1892–93. As a devout Catholic, only the second to be selected as Mayor since the Reformation, he had certain difficulties in coping with the traditions of the office caused by his refusal to enter a Protestant church. He was nevertheless given the honour of a baronetcy in 1893 to celebrate the marriage of the Duke and Duchess of York.

In 1897, Knill transferred his aldermanry to the adjacent ward of Bridge Without to make room for his son Sir John Knill, 2nd Baronet, who became Lord Mayor in turn in 1909.

Knill was a member of the Plumbers’ Company and was also on the Court of the Goldsmiths’ Company. He was created a Knight of St. Gregory by the Pope and an officer of the Order of St Leopold by the King of the Belgians.

Knill died in 1898. He had married Mary, the daughter of Charles Rowland Parker of Blackheath and had several children, including his heir and four daughters.

Civic offices
Preceded by Sir David Evans	Lord Mayor of London; 1892 – 1893	Succeeded by Sir George Tyler, Bt
Baronetage of the United Kingdom
New creation	Baronet (of The Grove); 1893–1898	Succeeded by John Stuart Knill
