= Baddeley baronets =

Baronetcy in the Baronetage of the United Kingdom

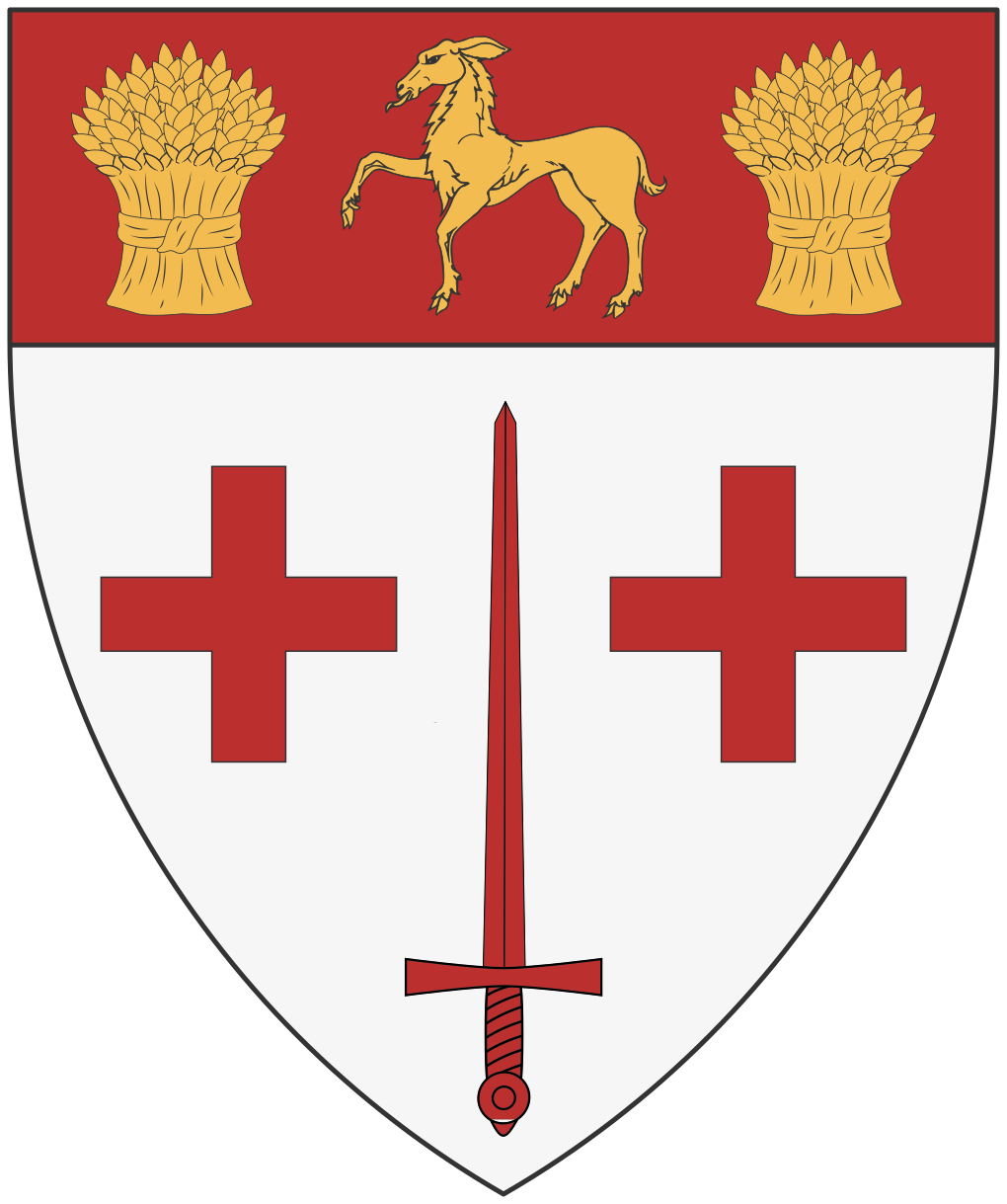
Arms of Baddeley of Lakefield

The Baddeley Baronetcy, of Lakefield in the Parish of St Mary, Stoke Newington in the County of London, is a title in the Baronetage of the United Kingdom. It was created on 24 November 1922 for Sir John Baddeley, head of Baddeley Brothers, wholesale stationers, and Lord Mayor of London between 1921 and 1922. The second and third Baronets were each managing director of Baddeley Brothers.

== Baddeley baronets, of Lakefield (1922) ==
- Sir John James Baddeley, 1st Baronet (1842–1926)
- Sir (John) William Baddeley, 2nd Baronet (1869–1951)
- Sir John Beresford Baddeley, 3rd Baronet (1899–1979)
- Sir John Wolsey Beresford Baddeley, 4th Baronet (born 1938)

The heir presumptive is the present holder's cousin Paul Allan Baddeley (born 1948). The heir presumptive's heir apparent is his son Thomas Sands Baddeley (born 1978).
