= Thomas Blanke =

English politician

Sir Thomas Blanke

Lord Mayor of London
- In office 1582–1583
- Monarch: Elizabeth I

Sheriff of London
- Incumbent
- Assumed office 1574

Personal details
- Born: c. 1514
- Died: 1588 (aged c. 74)
- Resting place: St Mary-at-Hill
- Spouse: Unnamed (d. 1596)
- Children: None
- Parent: Thomas Blanke
- Relatives: James Altham (brother-in-law)
- Occupation: Haberdasher, politician
- Known for: "The Good Knight"

Sir Thomas Blanke (died 1588) was an English politician who served as Lord Mayor of London.

He was the son of a London haberdasher, also named Thomas Blanke, and the brother-in-law of James Altham, one of the Sheriffs of London in 1557. Like his father, Thomas Blanke followed the trade of a haberdasher. He became an alderman in 1572 and served as one of the Sheriffs of London in 1574.

He was elected Lord Mayor of London in 1582. He had the misfortune to be elected during a severe outbreak of the plague; due to the pestilence, there was no pageant celebrating his election, and he was not presented to the queen until the next May.

Much of his mayoralty was spent dealing with the effects of the plague, and his efforts earned him the appellation of "The Good Knight". He died in 1588, at the age of 74, and was buried at St Mary-at-Hill; his wife lived until 1596, being buried in the same tomb. As he had died without issue, his estate at Abbott's Inn passed into the Altham family, who retained it until it was destroyed in the Great Fire of London.

Civic offices
Preceded by James Harvey	Lord Mayor of London; 1582	Succeeded by Edward Osborne
