= Edward Holmeden =

Sir Edward Holmeden or Holmden (1544–1616) was an Alderman and Sheriff of London.

== Career ==
Holmeden was a grocer. As a member of the Venice Company and Levant Company, he was involved in the import of currants from Greece, and the export of cloth (linen and canvas) to Morocco. Holmeden was Sheriff of London in 1598/9, an office held jointly with Richard Hampson. He was one of the first investors or adventurers in the English East India Company in 1600. Holmeden was knighted by James VI and I on 26 July 1603 at Whitehall Palace.

In 1590 Holmeden lived in a large house in the parish of St Mary Woolchurch Haw which belonged to his wife's cousin, Sir Thomas Ramsey. He was churchwarden there in 1573. In 1599 he was living in the parish of St Christopher le Stocks.

He died on 4 July 1616 and was buried at St Mary's Church in Leyton where there is a memorial brass to him.

== Turks and Moors ==
When orders were made by Elizabeth I to transport 24 "Turks and Moors" from England, the Earl of Nottingham as Admiral asked two aldermen and grocers Edward Holmeden and Henry Anderson to find housing for them until shipping to their home countries was available. Two years later, Thomas Eviseed was asked to pay the expenses for their lodging at sixpence a day, which amounted to a total of £23/2/- (approximately equivalent to £6,704 in 2023.) The date of this incident is unknown. The men perhaps included captured galley slaves to be returned home by the Levant Company to Mehmed III Sultan of the Ottoman Empire. Holmeden and Richard Staperr, a former governor of the Levant Company, had sent a joint letter as merchants trading with Turkey to Sir Robert Cecil in December 1595, asking him to ensure Elizabeth sent a letter of congratulation to Mehmed III, which could be sent in one of their trading ships.

Some proclamations addressing London aldermen regarding deportations of "Blackamoores" were drafted for Elizabeth, and a German merchant Casper Van Senden offered to transport people to Spain or Portugal. Van Senden's scheme seems not to have come to any effect.

== Marriage and family ==
Edward Holmeden married Elizabeth Taylor. They had five sons; Thomas (died 1585), Thomas, Edward (died 1588), George (died 1596), and John; and four daughters; Mary, Susan, Elizabeth (died 1585), and Elizabeth. Of these children:

- Mary Holmeden married (1), Richard Glover in 1592, (2) in 1599, Sir Ralph Hare MP
- Susan Holmeden married John Robinson on 7 March 1602
