= James Harvey (merchant) =

Lord Mayor of London in 1581

Sir James Harvey (died 1583) was an English merchant who was Lord Mayor of London in 1581.

Harvey was the son of William Harvey of Cotwalton (aliter Cott Walton / Walton-in-Stone), near Stone, Staffordshire. He purchased Wangey House, Dagenham from Clement Sysley of Eastbury House in 1571, and the manor of Winterbourne Monkton, Wiltshire in 1577.

He was an ironmonger in the city of London and a member of the Worshipful Company of Ironmongers. In 1572, 1576, 1580, and 1582, he was Master of the Ironmongers Company. In 1571, he was elected an alderman of the City of London. He was High Sheriff of London in 1573. In 1581 he was elected Lord Mayor of London.

Sir James Harvey married Agnes Gent, the daughter of Count Sebastian Gent of Antwerp. They had three sons and three daughters:

- Sir Sebastian Harvey, Master of the Ironmongers' Company in 1600 and Lord Mayor of London in 1618
- James Harvey, of Wangey, Essex, who married Elizabeth, daughter of Anthony Radcliffe
- William Harvey
- Clerkin, wife of Alexander Avenon
- Elizabeth
- Agnes

He died in 1583 and was buried at St Dionis Backchurch, London.

Civic offices
Preceded by John Branche	Lord Mayor of the City of London; 1581	Succeeded by Thomas Blanke
