= Robert Hampson (sheriff) =

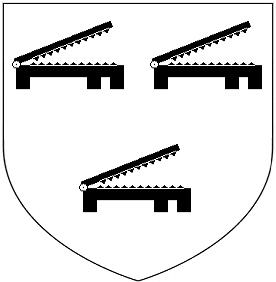
Canting arms of Hampson: Argent, three hemp-brakes sable

Sir Robert Hampson (1537–1607) was one of the two Sheriffs of the City of London in 1599 with Edward Holmeden. He was an Alderman of the City of London and was knighted by King James I on his entry into England in 1603.

== Marriage ==
He married Katheren Goad (1553–1625), daughter of John Goad (alias Good), a Citizen of London and member of the Worshipful Company of Merchant Taylors. She survived him and remarried to Sir John Rotheram, and was buried in St. Mary's Church, Watford, Hertfordshire, where survives her mural monument, a lady kneeling at a prie dieu with open book thereon. She is buried in the floor beneath (not with her first husband as his monument in St Mary Hill Church, Billingsgate, suggests), under a black slab inscribed as follows:

"Seaventy two yeares goodnesse lyes inhum'd,
Under this stone her bones may be consum'd,
By time but memory,
Shall with her soule live to Eternity.
To rich and poore her children & her frends,
Her life was dedicat; shee had noe ends,
But Love and Charity; her good mind
God grant to us which heere are left behind".

"To ye memory of the virtuous Lady Katheren Rotheram late wife to Sr John Rotheram, first espoused to Sr Robert Hampson, knight & Alderman of London, by whome shee left two sonns and two daughters. Shee departed this life ye 22 of February Anno Dom. 1625 (A)etatis (suae) 72"

== Children ==
By his wife he had nine children, of whom four survived, two sons and two daughters:

- Nicholas Hampson (died 1637), died unmarried
- Sir Thomas Hampson, 1st Baronet (c. 1589–1655), created a baronet by King Charles I on 3 June 1642.
- Rebecca Hampson, wife of Sir Anthony Forest of Marston, Huntingdonshire.
- Elizabeth Hampson, who married three times:
  - Firstly to John Hewet of Headly Hall, Yorkshire, by whom she had Sir John Hewet, 1st Baronet (c. 1598–1657)
  - Secondly to Sir Gilbert Wakering, of Brockwith, Staffordshire
  - Thirdly to Sir Robert Bevile, KB

== Death and burial ==
He died on 2 May 1607 and was buried in St Mary-at-Hill Church, Billingsgate, in the City of London. His funeral was marshalled and attended by the heralds. His mural monument existed (before the church was largely destroyed in the Fire of London in 1666) on the south wall of the choir inscribed thus, as transcribed in a later edition of the Survey of London by John Stow (c.1525-1605):

"Here lye intombed the bodies of Sir Robert Hampson, Knt and Alderman of London, who deceased the 2d day of May 1607 in the 70 yere of his age. And of Dame Katharine his wife at whose charge this monument is erected. They had issue nine children, whereof four are living. The said Dame Katharine deceased ...."

== Sources ==
- Wotton, Thomas, The English Baronets, Volume 2, London, 1741, pp. 295–7, Hampson Baronets
- Betham, William, History of the English Baronets, Volume 2, London, 1802, pp. 5–8, Hampson Baronets
- Heraldic Visitation of Buckinghamshire, pp. 71–2, pedigree of Hampson
