= William Whetenhall =

English businessman of the 15th century

William Whetenhall (died 1457) was an English businessman who served as Sheriff of London in 1440.

== Life ==
From a family originating in Wettenhall in Cheshire, and probably born before 1410, he was in business in the City of London as a member of the Grocers' Company, being chosen as Master of the Company from 1439 to 1441 and a second time from 1446 to 1448.

From 1434 to 1438 he was Warden of London Bridge and in 1438 was elected alderman for the ward of Farringdon Within, holding the post until 1446. In 1440 he was appointed sheriff for the year, and from 1446 to 1451 was alderman for the Walbrook ward.

Making his will on 22 March 1457, he died before 11 April 1457 when it was proved.

== Family ==
Married before 1433, his wife's name was probably Alice and his heir was his son William II Whetenhall, who married Margaret, daughter and coheiress of the MP and sheriff, William Hextall, owner of the estates of Hextall's Court and Eastmere in East Peckham in Kent. She later married the MP Sir Henry Ferrers, of Hambleton in Rutland, and had a son Sir Edward Ferrers, also an MP, but it was her son William III Whetenhall from her first marriage who inherited her Kent estates and in 1526 served as High Sheriff of Kent.
