= George Bolles =

English merchant

Sir George Bolles or Bolle (died 1 September 1621) was an English merchant who was Lord Mayor of London in 1617.

Bolles was from Gosberton in Lincolnshire. He became a city of London merchant and a member of the Worshipful Company of Grocers. He was a member of the committee of the East India Company from 1602 to 1607, and was Master of the Grocers Company in 1606. On 14 July 1607 he was elected an alderman of the City of London for Dowgate ward. He was Sheriff of London for the year 1608 to 1609. From 1610 to 1611, he was on the committee of the East India Company. He became alderman for Walbrook ward in 1616. In 1617, he was elected Lord Mayor of London. When he was Lord Mayor, he is said to have stopped the royal carriages when they drove through the City on Sunday during divine service. James I remarked in amazement that he had thought there was no king in England besides himself. In spite of this, Bolles was knighted on 31 May 1618.

Bolles married Jane Harte, daughter and co-heir of Sir John Harte, Lord Mayor of London in 1589. He thereby acquired the estate of Scampton, Lincolnshire. They had four children and his heir and successor was Sir John Bolles, 1st Baronet, High Sheriff of Lincolnshire, who was created baronet.

Bolles died in 1621 and was buried at St Swithins church, London.

Civic offices
Preceded by John Leman	Lord Mayor of the City of London; 1617	Succeeded by Sir Sebastian Harvey
