= John Jolles =

English merchant

Sir John Jolles (died 31 May 1621) was an English merchant who was Lord Mayor of London in 1615. John married Alice the daughter of Richard Wright of London on 1 December 1572 at All Hallows, Lombard Street, London.

Jolles was a city of London merchant and a member of the Worshipful Company of Drapers. On 11 June 1605 he was elected an alderman of the City of London for Tower ward. He was Sheriff of London from 1605 to 1606 and was the dedicatee as Sheriff of a poem England's Farewell to Christian the Fourth, Famous King of Denmark by Henry Roberts;

Jolles was knighted on 23 July 1606. In 1613, he endowed a school and almshouses in Stratford-le-Bow. In 1615, he was elected Lord Mayor of London and as Lord Mayor was dedicatee of a poem London's Artillery (1616) by Richard Niccols. He was a Colonel of the Trained Bands from 1618 to 1621.

Civic offices
Preceded by Thomas Hayes	Lord Mayor of the City of London; 1615	Succeeded by John Leman
