= Abraham Reynardson =

English merchant (1589-1661)

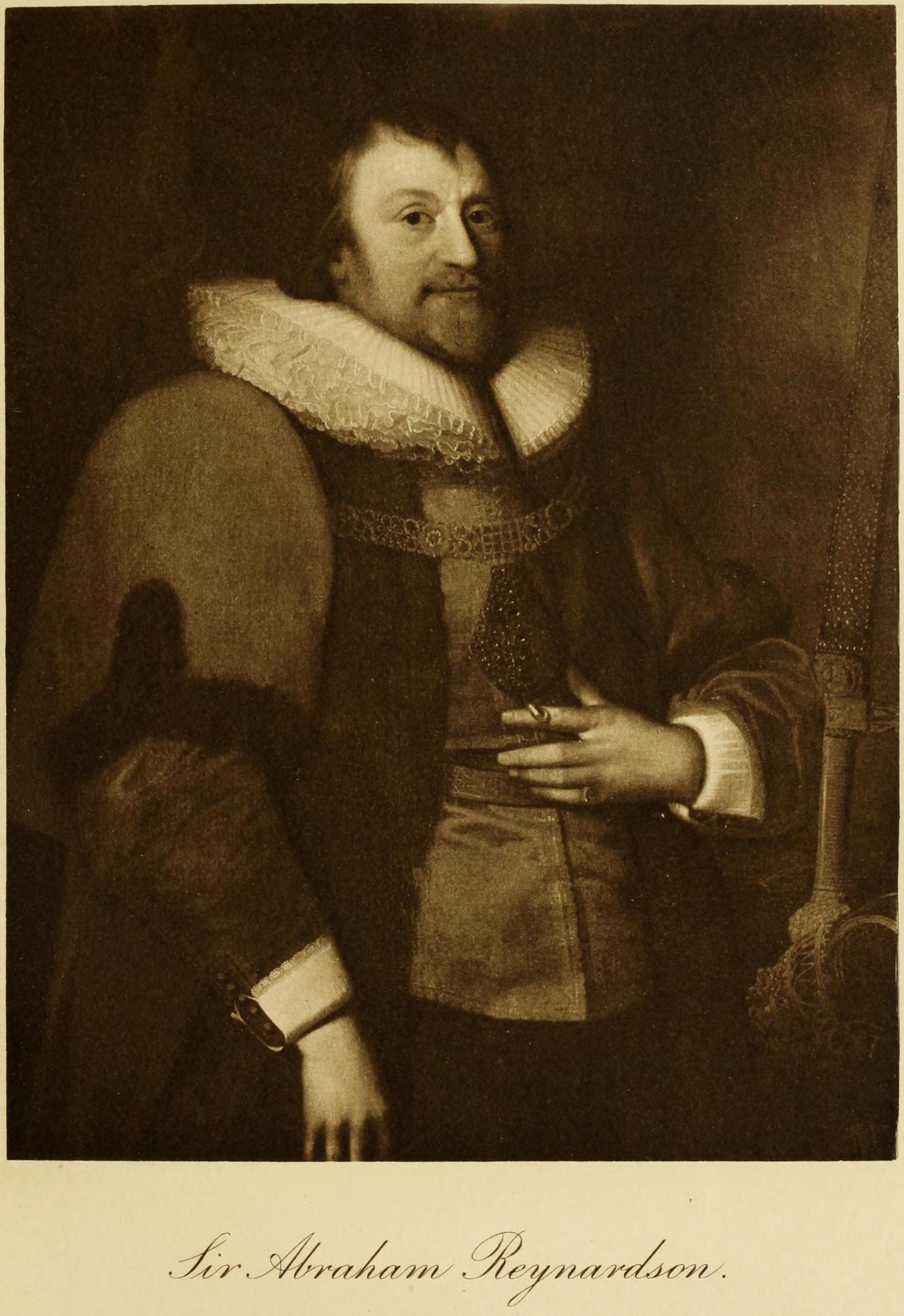
Sir Abraham Reynardson

Abraham Reynardson (1589 – 4 October 1661) was an English merchant who was Lord Mayor of London in 1649.

== Early life ==
Reynardson was born at Plymouth, the son of Thomas Reynardson, Turkey merchant of Plymouth and his wife Julia Brace, He served his apprenticeship in London to Edmund James, of the Worshipful Company of Merchant Taylors. Reynardson became a member of the Merchant Taylors' Company, and became a freeman of the city on 5 October 1618. He was a member of the committee of the East India Company from 1630 to 1631 and a Court Assistant from 1630 to 1632. He was a member of the committee of the East India Company from 1634 to 1635, a Court Assistant from 1635 to 1636 and a member of the committee of the East India Company from 1636 to 1640.

== Political career ==
In 1639 Reynardson purchased his manor house at Tottenham. In the same year, he was elected Sheriff of London and became treasurer of the Levant Company until 1641. In 1640 he took an assignment of Sir W. Acton's house in Bishopsgate Street. He served as Sheriff and master of the Merchant Taylors company from 1640 to 1641. He sympathised with the Royalist cause and as master of the Merchant Taylors he helped to respond to King Charles's demand for a loan from the city companies in 1640. On 12 November 1640, he was elected an alderman of the City of London for Bishopsgate ward. He was a member of the committee of the East India Company from 1641 to 1650. Neither he nor his colleagues on the court of the company assisted the corporation, except under compulsion, in raising loans for the parliament in 1642 and 1643. In 1648 became Alderman for Candlewick ward.

In 1648 Reynardson was elected 312th Lord Mayor of London, the first Devonshire man to become Lord Mayor. His election sermon was preached by Obadiah Sedgwick, an eloquent divine, whom Oliver Cromwell had stigmatised as "a rascally priest." Reynardson soon came into conflict with the Rump Parliament, which had declared all oaths of allegiance to the king illegal. He refused to admit to the common council members who had not made the customary loyal subscription, but parliament retaliated on 5 January 1649 by ordering him to assemble the council and suspend the taking of oaths. Expecting resistance, they further directed him to remove the chains which had been placed across the streets as a protection from cavalry charges. Reynardson did not countenance the act constituting the court for the trial of King Charles and it was read in his absence at the Exchange and in Cheapside by the sergeant-at-arms, with the commons' mace upon his shoulder. Reynardson presided at a meeting of the common council on 9 January when a petition was read which had been circulated in the city, affirming "that the commons of England, in parliament assembled, have the supreme power of this nation". A committee recommended the petition's adoption, but when this recommendation was brought up at the meeting of the council on 13 January Reynardson refused to put the question. The debate on the subject lasted from eleven in the morning till eight in the evening, when the lord mayor left, and the resolution for presenting the petition was carried. The House of Commons took no proceedings against the Reynardson, but passed an ordinance that, if the mayor failed to call a meeting of the council on the requisition of six members, any forty of the members could convene the council without the Lord Mayor's presence. After the execution of Charles on 30 January, Reynardson held in his possession the "personal treaty," which was subscribed by most of the common council in favour of the proposed treaty between Charles and the parliament. Reynardson burnt the document "to ashes privately in his chamber," because it contained the names of leading citizens who had by their signatures approved its loyal sentiments. Reynardson accepted the presidency of St Bartholomew's Hospital in February 1649. On 23 March a copy of the act proclaiming the abolition of the kingly office was brought to Reynardson's house. When he refused to make it public, he was summoned to the bar of the House of Commons. He pleaded his conscientious scruples, but the house ordered him to pay a fine of £2,000, to be imprisoned in the Tower of London for two months, and to be deposed from the mayoralty. The court of aldermen at once took possession of the insignia, and proceeded to the election of a new mayor. Reynardson's tenure of office had brought with it a heavy pecuniary burden. By his own statement, he lost as much as £20,000 while mayor. When he refused to pay the fine imposed by parliament, "his goods, household stuff, and wearing apparel were ordered to be sold by the candle." In September 1649 he resigned the presidency of St Bartholomew's, on account of ill-health. Part of his fine was not paid, and on 7 May 1651, an order was issued that the whole of his estate was to be seized until the fine was liquidated. He was a member of the committee of the East India Company from 1653 to 1654 and from 1655 to 1656.

== Later life ==
After the Restoration, Reynardson and thirteen other members of the common council presented to the king a resolution commending Reynardson's action in January 1649. Charles II knighted the members of the deputation in May 1660, but Reynardson was knighted separately by Charles on his visit to the Guildhall on 5 July. He was formally restored as alderman for Bassishaw ward on 4 September He declined the office of Lord Mayor for 1660 to 1661 because of "his sickly condition".

Reynardson died at Tottenham in 1661 at the age of 71. His body lay in state at Merchant Taylors' Hall till 17 October when it was taken for burial at the church of St. Martin Outwich. His widow was buried in the chancel of the same church on 14 July 1674, but no monument was raised to either, and their remains, with many others, were removed to the city of London cemetery at Ilford in 1874, when the church was demolished. In his will he provided £300 as a pension for six poor women of his company, and 140 ounces of silver to be made into a basin and ewer for use at the feasts.

During his lifetime Reynardson lent large sums of money to the Merchant Taylors' Company and regularly attended the meetings of the court. He had presented two silver flagons and two gilt cups with covers to the church of St Martin Outwich. His extensive property included lands in Essex and Sussex.

Reynardson married twice. His first wife was Abigail Crisp, daughter of Alderman Nicholas Crisp of Bread Street and by her he had two sons of whom only one survived them. Abigail died in July 1632. He married secondly Eleanor Wynne, daughter of Richard Wynne of Shrewsbury and they had three sons and three daughters, all of whom survived their father.

Civic offices
Preceded by John Warner	Lord Mayor of the City of London; 1649	Succeeded by Thomas Andrewes
