= Sir George Tyler, 1st Baronet =

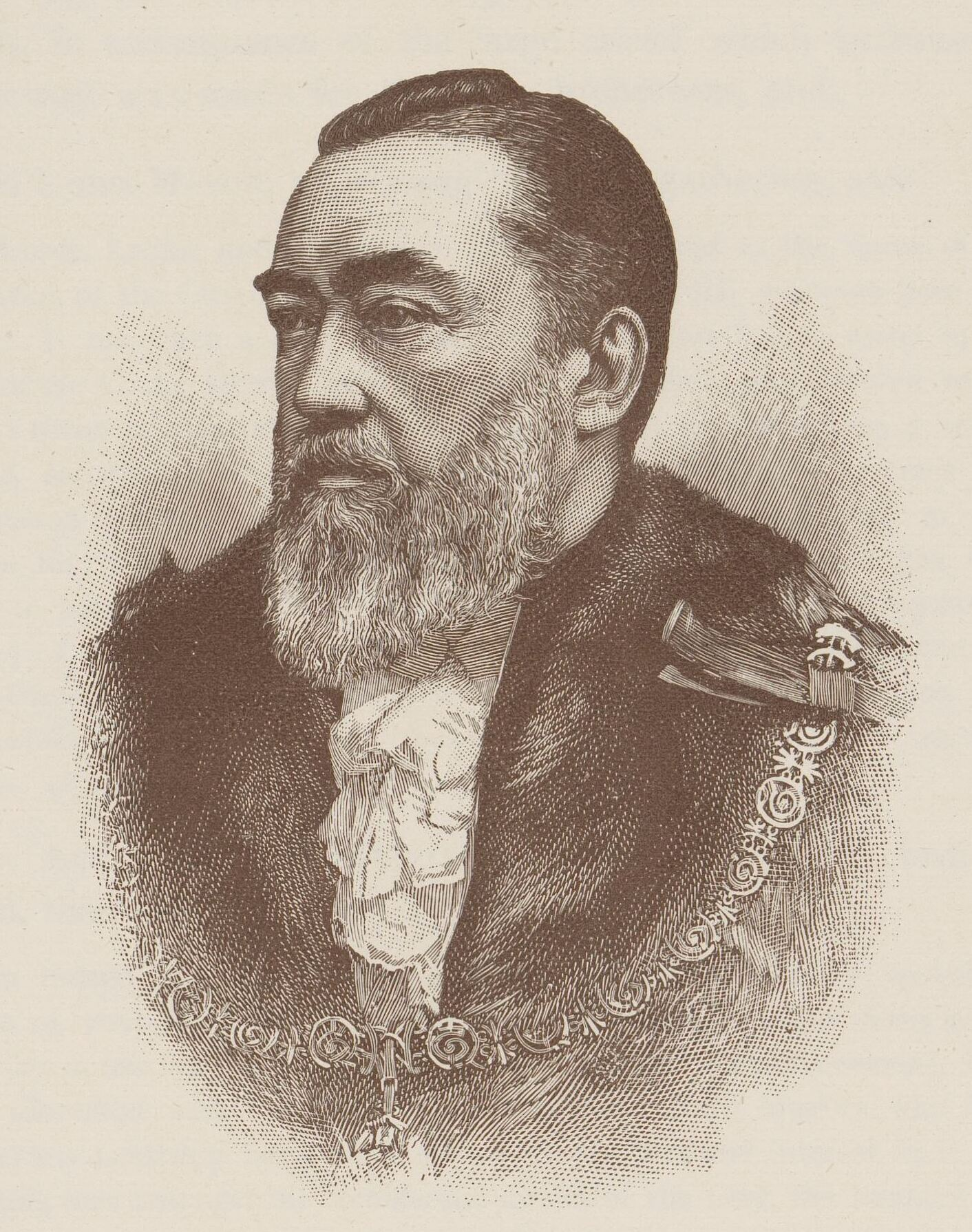
- Born: 26 August 1835
- Died: 26 November 1897 (aged 62); London
- Occupation: Politician
- Position held: Sheriff of the City of London, Lord Mayor of London (1893–1894)
- Titles: baronet

Sir George Robert Tyler, 1st Baronet (26 August 1835 – 26 November 1897) was a baronet and Lord Mayor of London.

== Career ==
Tyler was a founder of the firm of Venables, Tyler and Son, papermakers of 17 Queenhithe. He was a councilman and alderman from 1887 to his death, a Sheriff of London for 1891–2, and Lord Mayor of London for 1893–4. After a state visit to Antwerp they named a street Rue lord mayor Tyler in his honour. He was Master of the Stationers' Company for 1893–4. He was made a baronet, of Queenhithe, in 1894.

== Death ==
He died at his home at Earls Court and was buried at West Norwood Cemetery.

== See also ==
- List of Lord Mayors of London

Civic offices
Preceded by Sir Stuart Knill, Bt	Lord Mayor of London; 1893 – 1894	Succeeded by Sir Joseph Renals, Bt
Baronetage of the United Kingdom
New creation	Baronet (of Queenhithe and Penywern Road); 1894–1897	Succeeded by Frederick Tyler
