= John Warner (Lord Mayor) =

English merchant and Lord Mayor of London

John Warner (died 27 October 1648) was an English merchant who was Lord Mayor of London in 1647.

Warner was a city of London merchant and a member of the Worshipful Company of Grocers. He was Sheriff of London from 1639 to 1640. On 12 March 1640, he was elected an alderman of the City of London for Queenhithe ward. From 1642 to about 1645, he was Colonel of the Green Regiment, London Trained Bands. In 1647, he was elected 311th Lord Mayor of London.

Civic offices
Preceded by John Gayre	Lord Mayor of the City of London; 1647	Succeeded by Abraham Reynardson
