= Knill baronets =

Baronetcy in the Baronetage of the United Kingdom

Escutcheon of the Knill baronets of The Grove

The Knill Baronetcy, of The Grove in Blackheath in the County of Kent, is a title in the Baronetage of the United Kingdom. It was created on 11 August 1893 for Stuart Knill. He was head of John Knill and Co, wharfingers and the first Roman Catholic Lord Mayor of London (from 1892 to 1893). The 2nd Baronet was Lord Mayor of London from 1909 to 1910. The 3rd baronet lost his money and lived in poverty, becoming famous for trying to win money on the football pools by hypnotising his wife in order to predict the winning matches. The 4th baronet was a successful campaigner for the preservation of canals, particularly the Kennet and Avon Canal.

== Knill baronets, of The Grove (1893) ==
- Sir Stuart Knill, 1st Baronet (1824–1898)
- Sir John Stuart Knill, 2nd Baronet (1856–1934)
- Sir John Stuart-Knill, 3rd Baronet (1886–1973)
- Sir John Kenelm Stuart Knill, 4th Baronet (1913–1998)
- Sir Thomas John Pugin Bartholomew Knill, 5th Baronet (born 1952)

The heir presumptive is the present holder's brother Jenkyn Martin Benedict Stuart Knill (born 1954).

Baronetage of the United Kingdom
Preceded by Broadbent baronets	Knill baronets of The Grove; 11 August 1893	Succeeded by Wills baronets
