= Robert Lee (Lord Mayor) =

English merchant

Sir Robert Lee (c. 1550 – 22 December 1606) was an English merchant who was Lord Mayor of London in 1602.

Lee was a city of London merchant and a member of the Worshipful Company of Merchant Taylors. On 18 December 1593, he was elected an alderman of the City of London for Dowgate ward. He was Sheriff of London from 1594 to 1595. He became alderman for Cordwainer ward from 1599 to 1602, and for Langbourn ward from 1602 to 1605. In 1602, he was elected Lord Mayor of London. He was knighted on 22 May 1603. The Survey of London by John Stow dedicates it preface to Lee, listing him as the current Lord Mayor of London this was written in 1598 and published in 1603.

Lee married a daughter of Sir James Hawes, alderman of the City of London in 1565, and Lord Mayor in 1574. He was father of Sir Henry Lee, alderman in 1614 and father-in-law of William Gore. Following his death, his widow married Sir Thomas Gerard, 1st Baronet of Bryn.

Civic offices
| Preceded by Sir John Garrard | Lord Mayor of the City of London; 1602 | Succeeded by Sir Thomas Bennett |
