= Thomas Bennett (lord mayor) =

English merchant (1543–1627)

Arms of the City of London

Sir Thomas Bennett or Bennet (1543–1627) was an English merchant and Lord Mayor of London in 1603–1604.

A leading member of the Worshipful Company of Mercers, Bennett was elected an Alderman of the City of London for Vintry Ward on 7 February 1594. He was Sheriff of London for 1594–1595 and Master of the Mercers' Company in 1595–1596. He became Master Mercer again in 1602, and, in 1603, Bennett was elected Lord Mayor of London.

Bennett was knighted by King James I on 26 July 1603 and in 1604 he was elected Alderman of Lime Street Ward, serving until 1612. He was president of the Royal Bethlem and Bridewell Hospitals from 1606 to 1613 and in 1610 became Master Mercer again. In 1612 he transferred as Alderman for Bassishaw Ward which he represented until 1627. He was also President of St Bartholomew's Hospital from 1623 until his death on 20 February 1627.

In 1616, Bennett acquired the manors of Calverton, Buckinghamshire and Beachampton, also in Buckinghamshire, becoming Lord of the manor of each, styled as Lord de Calverton and Lord de Beachampton.

Bennett's eldest surviving son, Simon Bennett was created a baronet upon his father's death in 1627.

Bennett's daughter Mary married Richard Lewknor.

== See also ==
- List of Lord Mayors of London

Civic offices
Preceded by Sir Robert Lee	Lord Mayor of London; 1603–1604	Succeeded by Sir Thomas Lowe
