= Thomas Hayes (Lord Mayor) =

English merchant

Sir Thomas Hayes (1548 – 27 September 1617) was an English merchant, who served as Lord Mayor of London for 1614/15.

== Life ==
Born at Little Leigh to minor Cheshire gentry, Hayes prospered as a merchant in the City of London becoming Master of the Worshipful Company of Drapers.

Knighted on 26 July 1603 Hayes was elected on 22 December 1603 as Alderman of Bishopsgate Ward and served as Sheriff of London for 1604/05. In 1613 he was elected Alderman of Cornhill Ward before serving as Lord Mayor of London for 1614/15.

== Family ==
Hayes married twice, having by his first wife Margaret, daughter of Robert Hulse, Sheriff of London for 1586/87, a daughter Margaret who married Peter Egerton, younger son of Sir John Egerton.

Sir Thomas married secondly in 1609, Mary Milward, having another daughter, Mary Hayes, wife of Sir Henry Boothby, 1st Baronet.

Civic offices
Preceded by Sir Thomas Myddelton	Lord Mayor of London; 1614/15	Succeeded by Sir John Jolles
