= Casper Van Senden =

16th-century merchant and slave trader

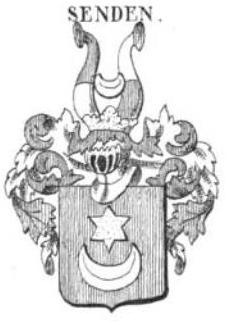
Casper Van Senden's coat of arms

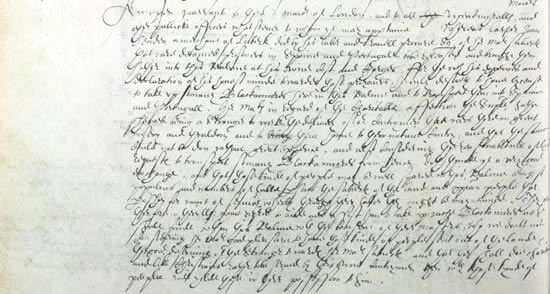
A letter written by Queen Elizabeth I concerning Casper Van Senden

Casper Van Senden was a German merchant who was active in Tudor-era England during the 16th century. Born in the German city of Lübeck, he eventually moved to the English capital of London, a major port at the time. Working as a merchant in Hanseatic League, he rose to prominence in 1596 by ensuring the safe return of 89 English subjects who were detained in the Iberian Union. This brought Van Senden to the attention of Queen Elizabeth I, as he entered her court to seek compensation.

While at the English court, Van Senden requested to transport "Blackamoores" out of the country and sell them in Portugal or Spain to compensate for the money spent freeing the 89 detainees. Some deportations of "Turks and Moors" from England were arranged at this period by Admiralty officials acting under royal authority.

Elizabeth subsequently issued a royal warrant to Van Senden, granting him the right to transport the "Blackamoores" out of the country and sell them in Portugal or Spain. During this time, he became a protégé of Sir Thomas Shirley, who supported his plans. The warrant stated (in part):

Casper van Senden a merchant of Lubeck did by his labor and travell procure 89 of her Ma[jesty's] subiectes that were detayned prisoners in Spaine and Portugall to be released, and brought them hither into this Realme at his owne cost and charges, for the w[hi]ch his expences and declaration of his honest minde towardes those prizoners, he only desireth to have lycense to take up so many Blackamoores here in this Realme and to transport them into Spaine and Portugall.

However, the plan proved unsuccessful, as the warrant stipulated that all Africans who were servants could not be removed with the permission of their masters, all of whom proved reluctant to assent to Van Senden's plan. A second warrand urged compliance. In the end, Van Senden failed to collect even one African to transport to Portugal or Spain. Despite this, he continued to work for the release of English subjects overseas.
