= John Leman =

Lord Mayor of London

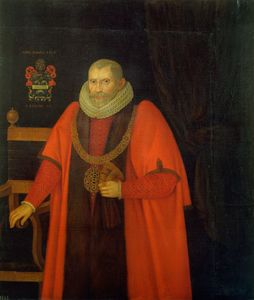
- Sir John Leman

Lord Mayor of London
- In office 1616
- Preceded by: Sir John Jolles
- Succeeded by: George Bolles

Personal details
- Born: 1544
- Died: 1632 (aged 87–88)

Sir John Leman (1544–1632) was a tradesman from Beccles, England who became Lord Mayor of London.

== Career ==
Leman's business interests grew across the district of Waveney, which spans the Norfolk–Suffolk border. In the 1580s he moved to London and extended his business interests to trading in dairy products there before becoming a liveryman of the Worshipful Company of Fishmongers. He was elected alderman of the City of London, in 1606 served as a Sheriff of London and in 1616 he served as Lord Mayor. His agents in London and Essex bought cheese and butter for delivery by sea to London. With a few other tradesmen he cornered the market and this de facto cartel was able to sell at an inflated price that fomented butter riots in London in the 1590s.

In the early 1600s Leman bought Goodman's Fields just outside the City of London near Aldgate. He developed the area as a suburb creating four streets: Leman Street, Ayliff Street, Mansell Street, and Prescot Street, the last three names being those of some of his close relatives.

In 1622 Leman, together with his nephew Robert Leman, and his late brother William's third son William Leman, bought the manor of Warboys, Huntingdonshire, from Oliver Cromwell. Sir John acquired adjacent land a year later and in 1628 Robert granted his interest in the manor to Sir John and William. The latter inherited full title to the manor on Sir John's death.

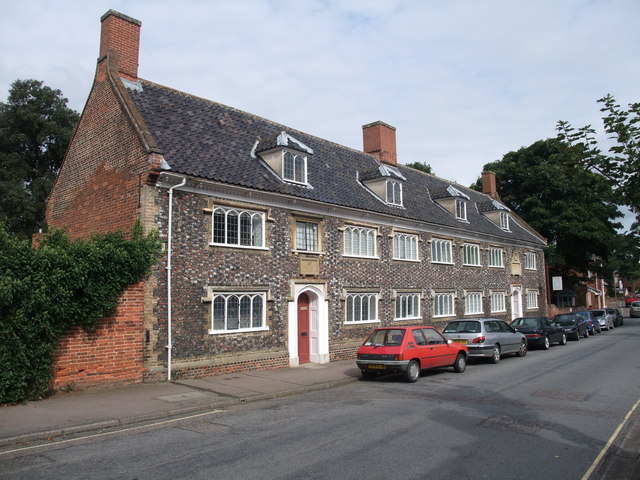
The school John Leman commissioned in Beccles

Leman died unmarried in 1632 and was buried at St Michael's, Crooked Lane, London. He had retained a strong link with Beccles and provided for a free school in his will of 1631 for the education of 44 pupils from Beccles, two from Ringsfield, Suffolk, and two from Gillingham, Norfolk. The 17th century Leman House in Ballygate, a Grade I listed building, was once the John Leman School and its wall still bears the motto: Disce aut Discede (roughly translated as 'learn or go'). Today the town's museum is situated in Leman House, and the town's high school still bears his name, Sir John Leman High School.

Civic offices
Preceded by Sir John Jolles	Lord Mayor of London; 1616	Succeeded by George Bolles
