= Ambrose Nicholas =

Sir Ambrose Nicholas (died 1578) was the Lord Mayor of London in 1575. He was a salter by profession.

In 2015 his body was mistakenly confirmed as having been interred in the Bethlem burial ground, which was excavated as part of the development of Crossrail, west of Liverpool Street station, London. His name was not included on the 'Bedlam Burial Register'. In his will, proved 31 May 1578, Sir Ambrose Nicholas requested that his body was to be buried within the parish church of St Mildred, Bread Street.
