= Sir John Knill, 2nd Baronet =

Lord Mayor of London from 1909 to 1910

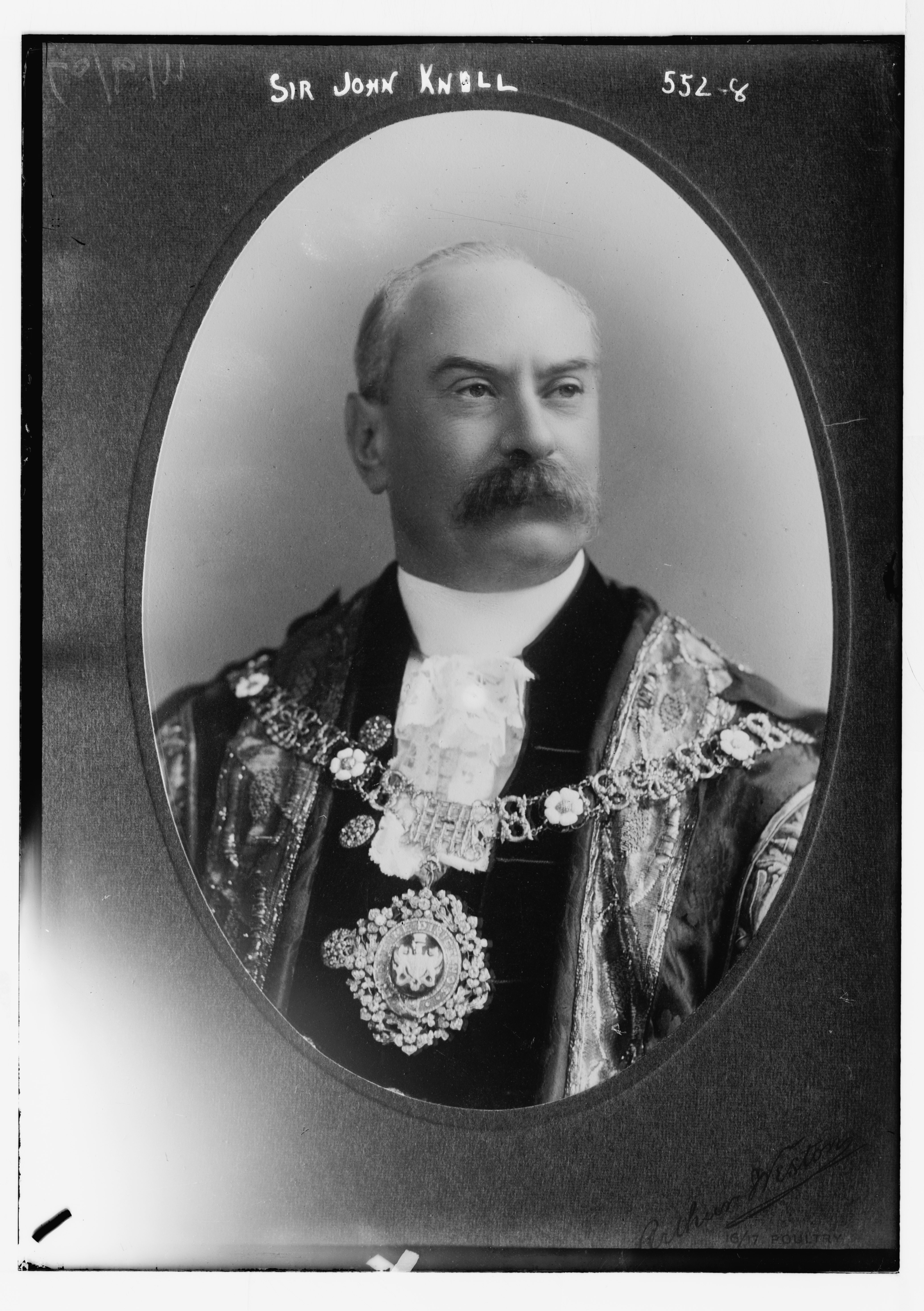
Sir John Knill

Sir John Stuart Knill, 2nd Baronet (4 September 1856 – 26 March 1934) was Lord Mayor of London for 1909 to 1910.

He was the son of Sir Stuart Knill, 1st Baronet, who in 1892 became only the second Roman Catholic Lord Mayor of London since the Reformation.

Sir John Knill was elected as Alderman for Bridge Ward in the City of London in 1897, and as an Aldermanic Sheriff in 1903.

He was Master of the Worshipful Company of Plumbers three times, in 1902/3, 1903/4 and 1909/10.

== See also ==
- Knill baronets
