= Thomas Crosby (lord mayor) =

British surgeon and Lord Mayor of London

Sir Thomas Crosby FRCS

Lord Mayor of London
- In office 1911–1912
- Preceded by: Thomas Vezey Strong
- Succeeded by: Thomas Crosby

Sheriff of London
- In office 1906–1907 Serving with Sir William Dunn

Personal details
- Born: Thomas Boor Crosby; 1830
- Died: 7 April 1916 (aged 85–86)
- Occupation: Surgeon

Sir Thomas Boor Crosby (1830 – 7 April 1916) was a British surgeon who was the Lord Mayor of London from 1911 to 1912, having served as Sheriff of the City of London from 1906 to 1907. He was knighted in 1907.
