= Worshipful Company of Plumbers =

Livery company of the City of London

Coordinates: 51.51666°N 0.08604°W

The Worshipful Company of Plumbers is one of the livery companies of the City of London. The organisation received the right to regulate medieval plumbers, who were, among other things, responsible for fashioning cisterns, in 1365. It was incorporated under a royal charter in 1611 during the reign of King James I.

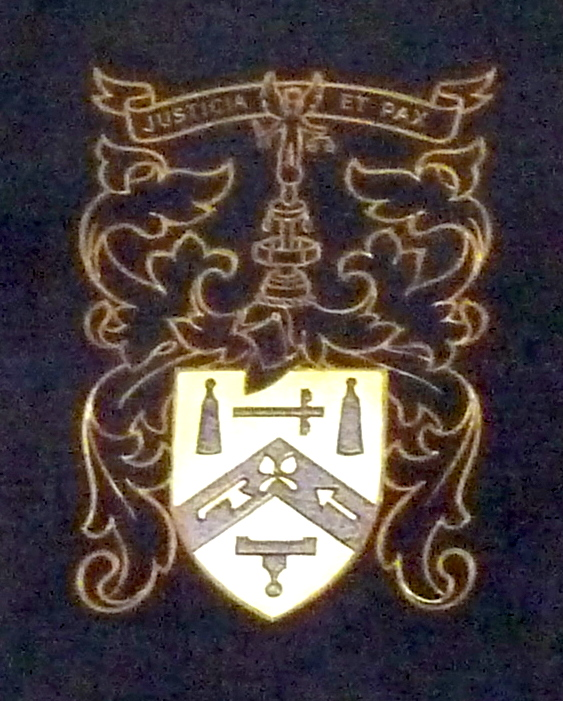
Coat of arms of the Worshipful Company of Plumbers

== History ==
Founded in 1365 to regulate the plumbing trade in medieval London, particularly overseeing work related to cisterns, water supply, and sanitation—critical functions for maintaining public health in a densely populated city.

The company was granted a Royal Charter in 1611 and, like other Worshipful Companies, oversaw apprenticeships (traditionally seven years), ensured workmanship quality, and disciplined poor practice or misconduct.

Its patron saint is Saint Michael, and it is associated with St Magnus the Martyr.

The first of the company's Halls in Chequer Yard was destroyed in the Great Fire of 1666. It was rebuilt in 1669 and served as the company's headquarters until 1863, when it was demolished to make way for Cannon Street station. A commemorative plaque marking the site's history was installed in the station's main entrance in 1983.

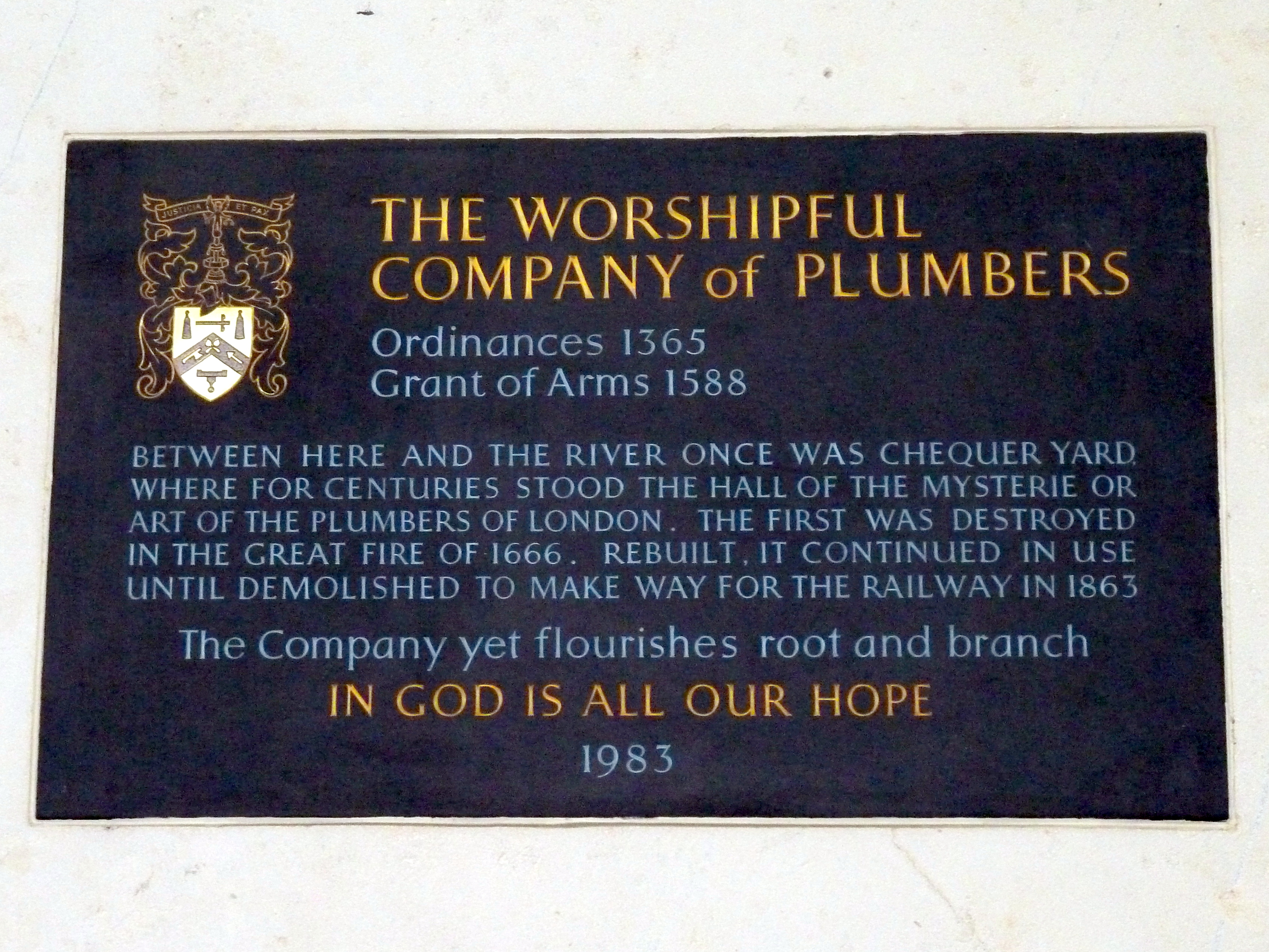
A commemorative plaque marking the site's history

In 2011, a statue titled “The Plumber’s Apprentice”, created by Martin Jennings, was erected inside Cannon Street station to commemorate the 400th anniversary of the company's Royal Charter.

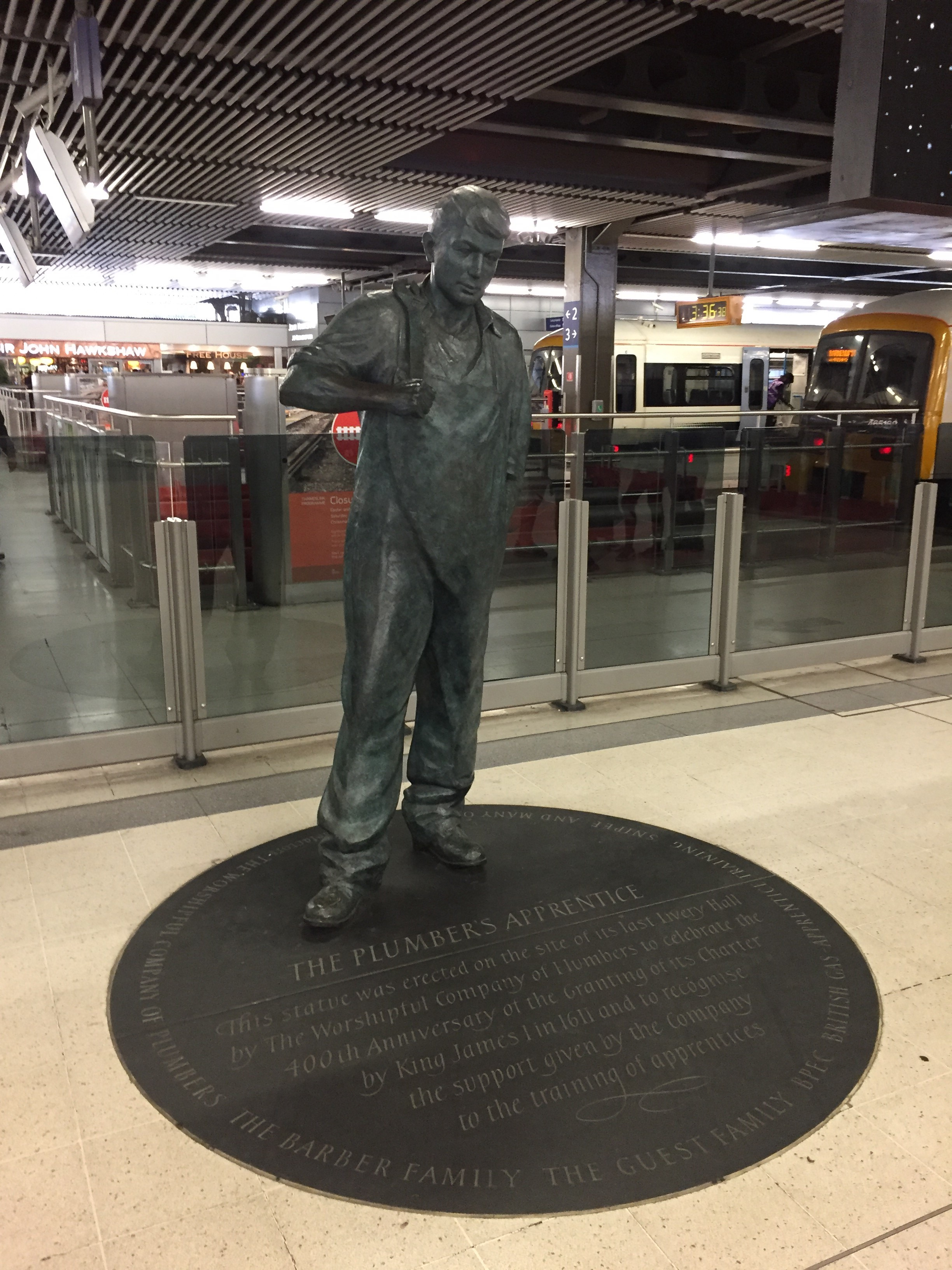
The Plumber's Apprentice by Martin Jennings

Volume MS5577 at the Guildhall Library contains an alphabetical list of members of the company, which includes dates of admission to the Livery for the Worshipful Company of Plumbers (1365–2000).

The Company no longer functions as a trade association and instead operates as a charitable institution. It maintains a connection with the plumbing profession by awarding medals and prizes within the general building industry.

The Plumbers' Company ranks thirty-first in the order of precedence of Livery Companies. Its mottoes are Justicia Et Pax, Latin for Justice and Peace, and In God Is All Our Hope.

Her Majesty The Queen (formerly HRH The Duchess of Cornwall) was admitted to the Worshipful Company of Plumbers on 26 January 2017.

Today, it continues its charitable and educational work, structured around five principal committees:

- Education & Technical
- Finance
- Freedom & Livery
- Membership
- Social

Each committee is chaired by a member of the Court. Court members have included Fiona Woolf and Paul Flatt.

== Eminent past members of the Worshipful Company of Plumbers ==
- Charles Atherton was appointed by Sir Christopher Wren as the King's Sergeant Plumber in 1676. He replaced his brother-in-law, Peter Brent, who had held the office since May 1661. Atherton served until 1708.
- Robert Crawford of Glasgow, whom presented the Scottish-American industrialist and philanthropist Andrew Carnegie with the Freedom of the Company at the Guilhall on 14 May 1902.
- John Embree was the Kings Sergeant Plumber from 1639 to 1661, and the only Master Plumber to hold the high office of Surveyor of the King's Works from 1653 – 1660.

== See also ==
- Amberley Museum, West Sussex
