= Sir John Baddeley, 1st Baronet =

English nobleman, judicial officer, and politician (1842–1926)

Sir John Baddeley Bt JP
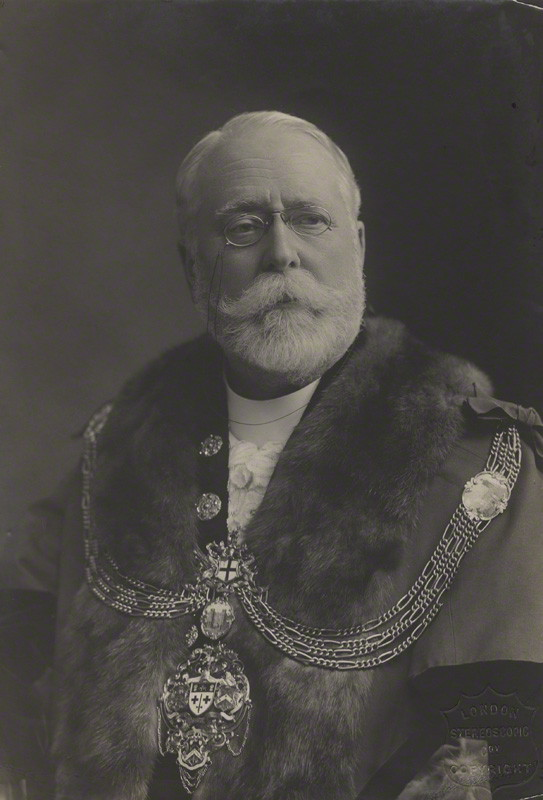

Lord Mayor of London
- In office 1921–1922

Personal details
- Born: John James Baddeley; 22 December 1842 Hackney, Middlesex, England
- Died: 28 June 1926 (aged 83)

Sir John James Baddeley, 1st Baronet (22 December 1842 – 28 June 1926) was an English nobleman, judicial officer, politician, and the 593rd Lord Mayor of London. He had previously served as justice of the peace for the County of London, Alderman of Farringdon Within, and Sheriff of the City of London.

== Background ==
He was the eldest son of John Baddeley and his wife Frances Beresford, fifth daughter of James Beresford. Baddeley was educated at Cambridge House School in Hackney.

== Career ==
Baddeley was Alderman of Farringdon Within and a member of the Court of Common Council from 1886. He was nominated Sheriff of the City of London in 1908 and was made a Knight Bachelor in the following year.

In 1921, Baddeley was appointed the 593rd Lord Mayor of London. After the end of his tenure in the following year, he was created a baronet, of Lakefield, in the Parish of St Mary, Stoke Newington, in the County of London on 24 November. Baddeley was a Commander of the Swedish Royal Order of Vasa and of the Russian Order of St Anna.

He served as justice of the peace for the County of London.

== Family ==
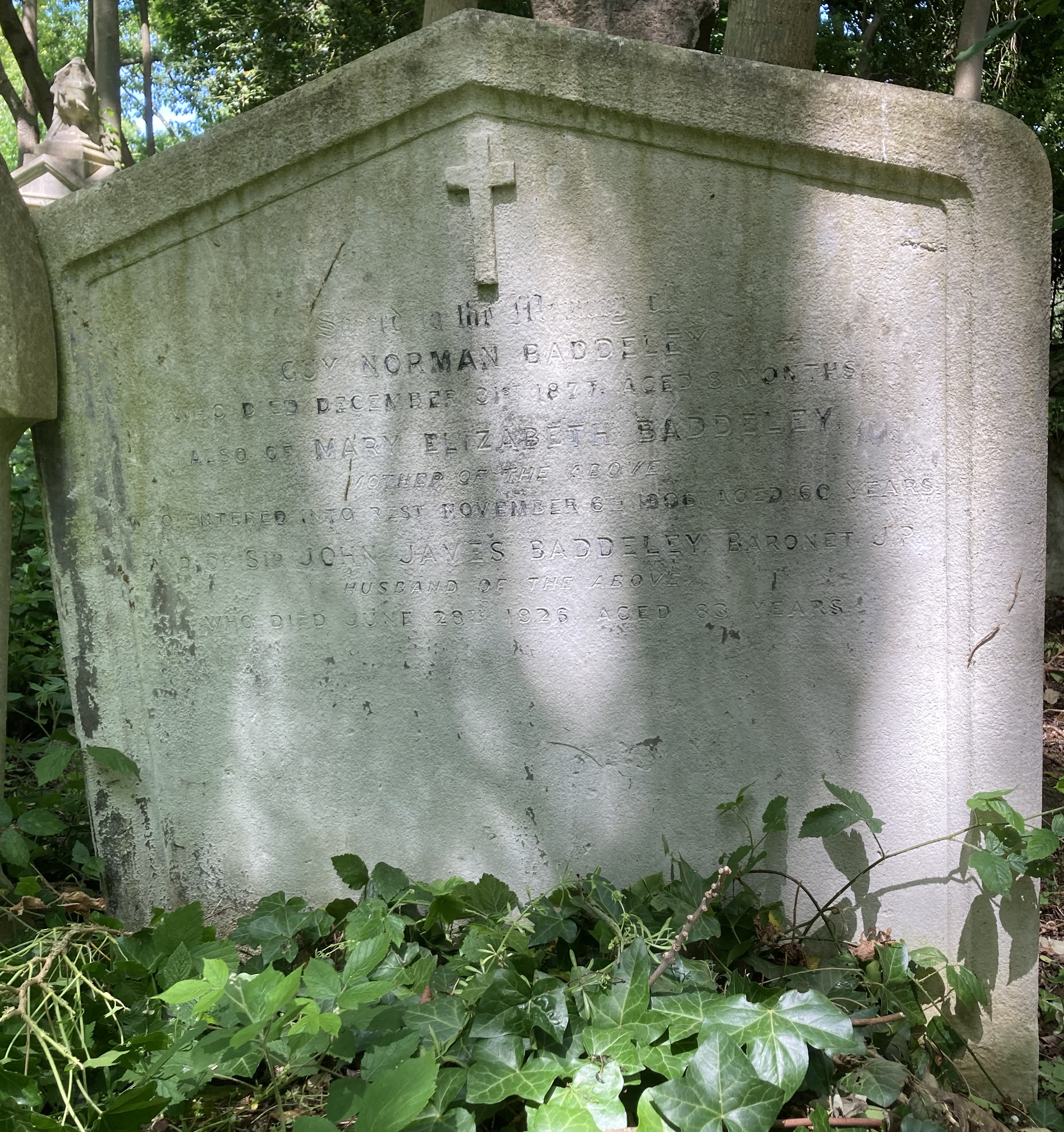
Grave of Sir John Baddeley in Highgate Cemetery

John James was the son of John Baddeley, a printer from the Baddeley brothers, a family printing company based in London. He was the oldest of twelve siblings; George Charles, Fredrick, William Henry, Frances Eliza, Charles Edward, Emma, Horace, Walter, Adele, Jesse, Lizzie and Alfred.

On 13 August 1868, he married firstly Mary Elizabeth Locks, daughter of William Locks, and had by her nine children, four daughters and five sons. After her death in 1906, Baddeley remarried Florence Bertha Mathews, daughter of Joseph Douglas Mathews on 25 July, 1912.

He died in 1926 and was buried in a family grave on the eastern side of Highgate Cemetery, London. He was succeeded in the baronetcy by his oldest son, John.

== Works ==
- A History of St Giles's Church (1880)
- The Aldermen of the City of London from 1276 (1900)
- A History of the Guildhall (1912)
- Cripplegate: One of the Twenty-Six Wards of the City of London (1921)

Honorary titles
Preceded by Sir James Roll, 1st Baronet	Lord Mayor of London; 1921 – 1922	Succeeded by Sir Edward Moore, 1st Baronet
Baronetage of the United Kingdom
New creation	Baronet (of Lakefield); 1922 – 1926	Succeeded by John William Baddeley
