= Gregory de Rokesley =

English goldsmith, Mayor of London and Warden of the Mint

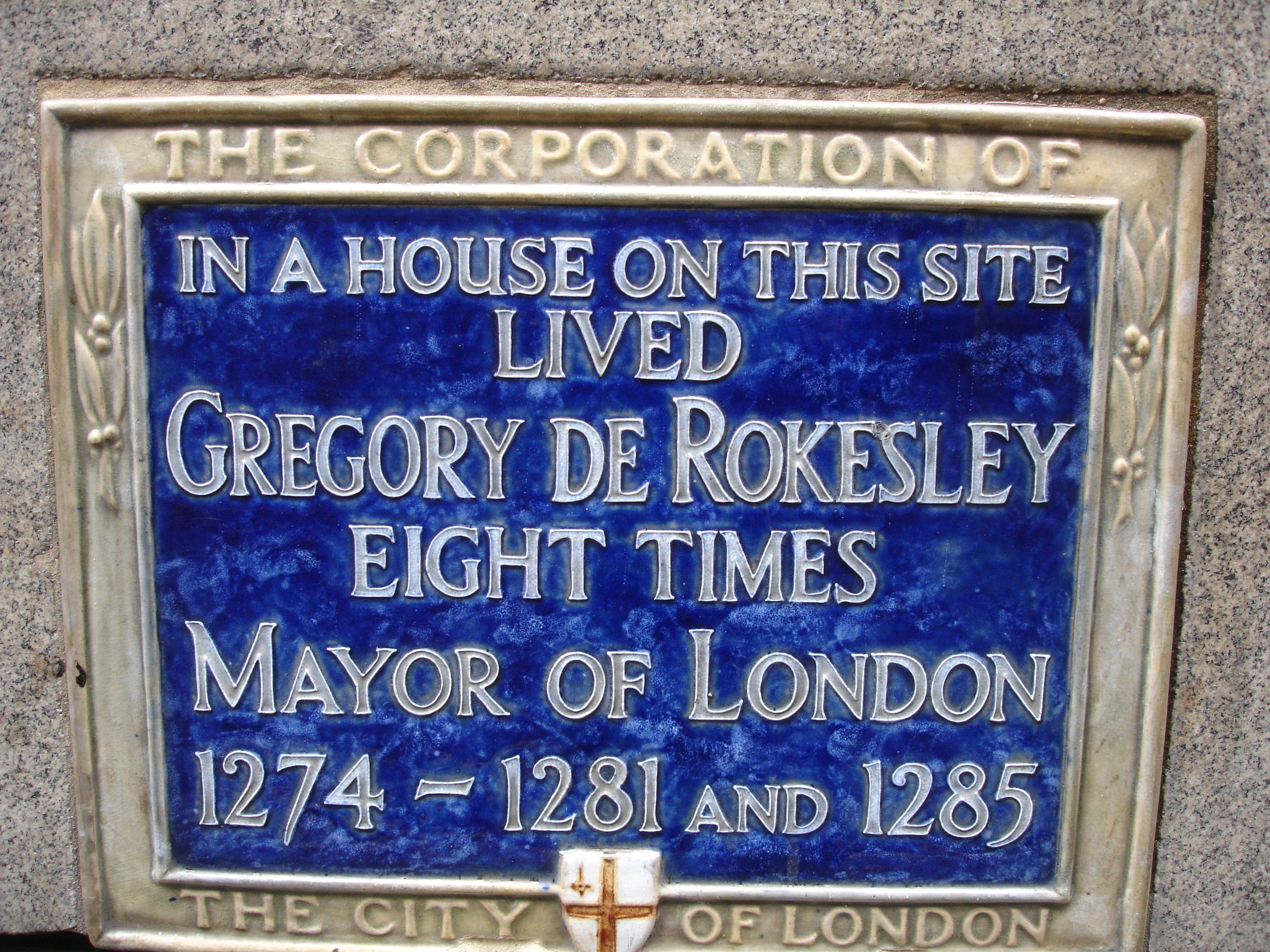
Gregory of Rokesley

Gregory de Rokesley (died 1291) was an English goldsmith, Mayor of London and Warden of the Mint. He was originally from Rokesley in Kent and was a wealthy wool merchant and goldsmith. In 1263, 1265 and 1270, he served as Sheriff of London and then served as Lord Mayor of London for a total of 8 occasions from the years 1274 through to 1280 and again in the year 1284. In 1276 he was made Kings Chamberlain and acted in that capacity for two years. He was joint Warden of the Mint from 1279 to 1292.

The site of his house, which existed near Lombard Street near where the Church of St Mary Woolnoth now stands is commemorated by a City of London blue plaque.

He was married to Avice, with whom he had two sons, Sir Reginald and Sir Richard.
