= William Servat (Member of Parliament) =

William Servat (fl. 1309–1313), was an English Member of Parliament (MP).

He was a Member of the Parliament of England for City of London in 1309 and 1313.

Parliament of England
Preceded by William de Combemartyn; Henry de Durham	Member of Parliament for City of London; 1309; With: Henry de Durham	Succeeded by John de Wengrave; Robert de Kelesye; Nicholas de Farndone

Parliament of England
Preceded by John de Wengrave; Robert de Kelesye; Nicholas de Farndone	Member of Parliament for City of London; 1313; With: Stephen de Abyndon; Nicholas de Farndone; William de Leyre	Succeeded by John de Gisors; Robert de Kelesye; William de Leyre
