= City of London (Parliament of England constituency) =

Constituency of the Parliament of England (to 1707)

- Former borough constituency and county constituency for the House of Commons

1298–1707
- Seats: 4-7
- Created from: Middlesex
- Replaced by: City of London (UK Parliament constituency)

The City of London was a parliamentary constituency of the Parliament of England until 1707.

== Boundaries and history to 1707 ==
This borough constituency consisted of the City of London, which was the historic core of the modern Greater London. In the twenty-first century, the City forms part of the London Region of England.

The southern boundary of the city is the north bank of the River Thames. The City of Westminster is situated to the west. The districts of Holborn and Finsbury are to the north, Shoreditch to the north-east and Whitechapel to the east.

Before 1298, the area was represented as part of the county constituency of Middlesex. The City formed part of the geographic county, even though from early times it was not administered as part of Middlesex.

London is first known to have been enfranchised and represented in Parliament in 1298. It was the most important city in England and was administered as a county of itself from before boroughs were first represented in Parliament. It received four seats in Parliament instead of the normal two for an English constituency. The extra two seats (whose holders were known as knights, like the representatives of a county) were supposed to represent the county-like status of London. No such extra seats were awarded to other cities or boroughs which received the status of being counties of themselves in later times.

By the sixteenth century it was the practice for the Court of Aldermen to summon a meeting at the Guildhall. The aldermen met and selected two candidates to sit as the city's knights in Parliament. One was normally an alderman (probably a former Lord Mayor of London). The other was normally the Recorder of London, whose legal expertise was essential to the City which had a lot of legislation it wanted drafted and passed by Parliament. On one occasion in the sixteenth century the Recorder was already a burgess representing another borough in Parliament, so two aldermen were chosen.

The aldermen also prepared a list of twelve prominent Londoners, who were not themselves aldermen. The nominees for knight were then put to the liverymen, who had been waiting whilst the aldermen met, for approval and an election was held to select two citizens from the list of twelve nominees to fill the other two seats in the House of Commons. The London election thus took place in a single day.

If the Recorder resigned during a Parliament or a citizen was elected an alderman, he was disqualified and the new Recorder or another citizen (as the case might require) was elected.

At some point after 1603 the City adopted a more normal system for nominations and elections. The two London Sheriffs appointed a day for candidates nominations to be submitted, at a meeting in the Guildhall. If there were more than four candidates a poll was held at a later date which usually extended for several weeks. Although it was no longer a legal requirement, there was a custom that two City seats were filled by Aldermen and two by non-Aldermen.

During the Protectorate the city was allocated six seats in the House of Commons, under the terms of the Instrument of Government adopted on 15 December 1653. However, by the time the Third Protectorate Parliament assembled in 1659 the constituency had reverted to its traditional four seats.

The City of London was a densely populated area in the period up to 1707. The composition of the City electorate was not as democratic as that of some other borough constituencies, such as neighbouring Westminster. The right of election was held by members of the livery companies. However, the size and wealth of the community meant that it had more voters than most other borough constituencies. Only Westminster had a larger borough electorate. Duke Henning estimated the City liverymen at about 4,000 in 1661 and about 6,000 by 1680.

== Members of the House of Commons ==
Some of the members elected during this period have been identified. The Roman numerals in brackets, following some names, are those used to distinguish different politicians of the same name in 'The House of Commons' 1509-1558 and 1558–1603. As there are considerable gaps between some of the parliaments in this period, each members career is sub-divided by parliament in the tables, even if he served in successive parliaments.

The elected date is for the City constituency. When an exact general election date is unavailable, the year or years between the dates of the parliament being summoned and assembling, are used.

=== 1298–1385 ===
Parliament	Aldermanic MPs by year
1298	Adam le Blund de Fulham; Walter de Finchingfeld
1299	William de Leyre; William de Betoyne
1300	Geoffrey de Northampton; William de Betoyne
1305	William de Combemartyn; Walter de Finchingfeld
1307	William de Combemartyn; Henry de Durham
1309	Henry de Durham; William Servat
1312	John de Wengrave; Robert de Kelesye; Nicholas de Farndone
1313	William Servat; Stephen de Abyndon; Nicholas de Farndone; William de Leyre
1314	John de Gisors; Robert de Kelesye; William de Leyre
1315	Henry de Durham; William de Leyre
1316	William de Combemartyn; William Trente; John de la Chambre; Hamo de Chigwell; Robert de Kelesye; Simon de Abyndon; Roger de Palmer; John de Bureford
1318	John de Cherleton; Roger de Palmer
1319	William de Leyre; William de Flete
1320	Anketin de Gisors; Nicholas de Farndone
1321	Hamo de Godchep; Nicholas de Farndone
1322 (May)	Robert de Swalclyve; Reginald de Conduit; William de Hakford; Gregory de Norton
1322 (Nov)	Thomas de Chetyngdone; Walter Crepyn
1324	Anketin de Gisors; Henry de Seccheford
1325	Anketin de Gisors; Henry de Seccheford
1327 (Jan)	Anketin de Gisors; Henry de Seccheford; Reginald de Conduit; Thomas de Leyre
1327 (Sep)	Benedict de Folesham; Robert de Kelesye
1328 (Feb)	Richard de Betoyne; John de Grantham
1328 (Apr)	Richard de Betoyne; Robert de Kelesye
1328 (Oct)	Stephen de Abyngdon; Robert de Kelesye
1330 (Mar)	Stephen de Abyngdon; John de Caustone;
1330 (Nov)	John de Grantham; Reginald de Conduit; Stephen de Abyngdon
1332	Anketin de Gisors (twice); Reginald de Conduit; John de Caustone (twice); Richard de la Pole
1334	Reginald de Conduit; John de Caustone; Roger de Depeham
1335	Richard de Rothyng; Richard le Lacer; Roger de Forsham
1336	Henry de Seccheford; Richard de Hakeneie; John de Caustone
1337	Reginald de Conduit (twice); John de Caustone; Benedict de Folesham
1338	John de Grantham; Richard de Rothyng; Andrew Aubrey; Ralph de Uptone (twice); Bartholomew Deumars
1339	Somin Francis (twice); John de Northall
1340	Richard de Rothyng; Andrew Aubrey; Richard de Berkynge; Walter de Mordone; Simon Francis; John de Mockyng; William (Curteys) de Bricklesworth (twice)
1341	Simon Francis; William (Curteys) de Bricklesworth
1344	John de Northall; John Lovekyn
1346	Thomas Legge; Geoffrey de Wychingham; John Lovekyn
1348	Richard de Berkynge (twice); John Lovekyn (twice)
1350	Simon Francis; Thomas Dolseley
1351	Thomas Legge; William de Iford (Common Serjeant)
1352	Simon Francis; Adam Francis; John Little
1353	Thomas Dolseley; Thomas Legge
1354	John de Stodeye; Thomas Dolseley
1355	Adam Francis; John de Stodeye
1357	Adam Francis; John de Stodeye
1358	William de Welde; Thomas Dolseley
1360	Bartholomew de Frestlyng; Stephen Cavendisshe; Walter de Berneye
1361	John Pecche; Adam Francis; John Pyel
1362	Adam de Bury; Bartholomew de Frestlyng; John Little; John Tornegold
1363	William Holbech; John de St. Albans; John Tornegold
1365	John Lovekyn; Adam Francis; Richard de Preston
1366	Adam Francis; John Wroth
1368	Bartholomew de Frestlyng; John Wroth; John Aubrey; John Organ
1369	John Pecche; Adam Francis; John de Stodeye; John Tornegold; John Aubrey; John Philpot; John Hadley; Nicholas Exton
1371	Bartholomew de Frestlyng; John Tornegold; William Walworth; John Philpot (twice); John Pecche; John Tornegold; John Fyfhide
1372	John Pecche; John Wroth; William Venour
1373	John Warde; Adam Stable; Adam Carlisle
1376	William Walworth; John Pyel; Adam Carlisle
1377	John Organ; John Hadley; William Walworth; John Philpot; Adam Carlisle; Walter Sibyle; William Tonge; William Venour
1378	John Northampton; John Hadley; William Venour; Geoffrey Newton
1379	William More; Adam Carlisle; John Hadley; Walter Sibyle
1380	Robert Launde; Thomas Cornwaleys; John Philpot; John Organ; John Boseham; Thomas Welford; William Tonge; John Rote
1381	Hugh Fastolf; William Baret; John Philpot; John Hadley
1382 (May)	Hugh Fastolf?; John More; Thomas Carleton; Richard Norbury
1383	Nicholas Brembre; William Baret; William Walworth; John Philpot; John More; Henry Vanner; Richard Norbury
1384	John Hadley (twice); John Organ (twice); John Rote; Thomas Rolf
1385	John Hadley; Nicholas Exton; William Anecroft

=== 1386–1421 ===
Parliament	First member	Second member	Third member	Fourth member
1386	John Hadley	John Organ	Adam Carlisle	Thomas Girdler
February 1388	William More	John Shadworth	William Baret	John Walcote
September 1388	Adam Bamme	Henry Vanner	William Tonge	John Clenhand
January 1390	William More	John Shadworth	Adam Carlisle	William Brampton
November 1390	William More	John Shadworth	Adam Carlisle	William Brampton
1391	William Sheringham	William Brampton	William Standon	John Walcote
1394	William Standon	John Fresshe	Thomas Exton	John Wade
1395	Adam Carlisle	Drew Barantyn	Geoffrey Waldern	William Askham
January 1397	William Standon	William Brampton	William Hyde	Hugh Short
September 1397	Andrew Newport	Drew Barantyn	Robert Ashcombe	William Chichele
1399	John Shadworth	William Brampton	William Sunningwell	Richard Marlow
1402	John Hadley	William Parker	John Prophet	William Norton
1404 (Jan)	William Standon	Drew Barantyn	William Marchford	John Prophet
1404 (Oct)	John Woodcock	William Brampton	Alan Everard	Robert Haxton
1406	William Standon	Nicholas Wotton	John Sudbury	Hugh Ryebread
1407	William Askham	William Cromer	William Marchford	John Bryan
1410	Drew Barantyn	Henry Halton	John Reynwell	Walter Gawtron
1411	Thomas Fauconer	Richard Marlow	John Sutton	John Mitchell
1413 (Feb)	William Askham	Drew Barantyn	William Marchford	Walter Gawtron
1413 (May)	William Askham	Drew Barantyn	William Marchford	Walter Gawtron
1414 (Apr)	Richard Marlow	Robert Chichele	William Burton	Alan Everard
1414 (Nov)	William Waldern	Nicholas Wotton	William Oliver	John Gedham
1415	Robert Chichele	William Waldern	John Reynwell	William Mitchell
1416 (Mar)	Richard Marlow	Thomas Fauconer	William Weston	Nicholas James
1416 (Oct)	Richard Whittington	Thomas Knollys	John Perneys	Robert Whittingham
1417	William Cromer	William Seveoak	John Welles	John Butler
1419	Nicholas Wotton	Henry Barton	Richard Meryvale	Simon Sewall
1420	Thomas Fauconer	John Mitchell	Solomon Oxney	John Higham
1421 (May)	William Waldern	William Cromer	William Burton	Richard Goslyn
1421 (Dec)	Thomas Fauconer	Nicholas Wotton	John Brokley	John Whatley

=== 1422–1508 ===
Parliament	Aldermanic MPs by year
1422	Thomas Fauconer; John Michell; Henry Frowick
1423	John Welles; Thomas Fauconer; Henry Frowick
1425	John Welles; Nicholas Wotton; Thomas Bernewell
1426	John Welles; John Michell
1427	John Welles; John Michell; William Melreth
1429	Nicholas Wotton; William Melreth
1431	Nicholas James; William Eastfield
1432	John Gedney; William Melreth; Philip Malpas
1433	John Welles;John Reynwell; Robert Catworth
1435	John Michell; Robert Large; Stephen Forster
1437	Henry Frowick; Robert Catworth; Nicholas Yoo
1439	William Eastfield; Robert Clopton; Geoffrey Fielding
1442	William Eastfield; Philip Malpas
1445	John Reynwell; Robert Catworth
1447	Henry Frowick; William Combes; William Marlowe; Hugh Wiche
1449	Robert Catworth; Stephen Browne; John Norman (twice); Geoffrey Boleyn
1450	Henry Frowick; William Marlow; Richard Lee
1453	Stephen Browne; John Atherley; William Cantelow; John Walderne; John Middleton
1455	Geoffrey Fielding; William Cantelow; John Yonge
1459	Thomas Canynges; Ralph Verney; Richard Fleming; John Bromer
1460	William Marlow; Thomas Cooke; Robert Bassett
1463	William Marlow; John Bromer
1467	Ralph Josselyn; John Warde; John Crosby
1469	Ralph Verney; George Irlond; Stephen Fabyan
1470	Thomas Cooke; Stephen Fabyan
1472	Ralph Verney; George Irlond; Stephen Fabyan
1478	William Hampton; Richard Gardiner; John Warde
1483	William Taillour; Richard Haryot; Robert Tate (twice); John Fenkyll; Hugh Clopton
1484	Richard Haryot; John Fenkyll
1485	John Warde
1487	Henry Colet; Hugh Pemberton
1489	William White; Henry Colet
1491	Robert Tate; William Capel; Nicholas Ailwyn
1495	John Warde; John Shaa; Thomas Bradbury
1497	Richard Chawry; Thomas Wyndout
1503	John Tate; John Shaa

=== Parliaments of King Henry VIII of England ===
No.	Summoned	Elected	Assembled	Dissolved
1st	17 October 1509	1509/10	21 January 1510	23 February 1510
2nd	28 November 1511	1511/12	4 February 1512	4 March 1514
3rd	23 November 1514	1514/15	5 February 1515	22 December 1515
4th	...	?1523	15 April 1523	13 August 1523
5th	9 August 1529	1529	3 November 1529	14 April 1536
6th	27 April 1536	1536	8 June 1536	18 July 1536
7th	1 March 1539	1539	28 April 1539	24 July 1540
8th	23 November 1541	1541/42	16 January 1542	28 March 1544
9th	1 December 1544	19 January 1545	23 November 1545	31 January 1547

No.	Elected	First member	Second member	Third member	Fourth member
1st	1509/10	Sir John Tate	John Chaloner [I]	James Yarford	John Brydges
1st	1510	Sir John Tate	John Chaloner [I]	Thomas More [I] (Note: More was elected at a by-election, held on an unknown date in 1510, before the Parliament assembled. He replaced James Yarford, who was disqualified from serving as a Citizen in Parliament when he was elected an Alderman of the City (see explanation above about who was eligible for which of the seats).)	John Brydges
2nd	1511/12	Sir William Capell	Richard Broke	William Calley	John Kyme [I]
3rd	1514/15	Sir William Capell	Richard Broke	William Calley (Note: Calley ceased to be an MP on 6 September 1515. It is unknown who replaced him.)	John Kyme [I]
3rd	1515	Sir William Capell	Richard Broke	unknown	John Kyme [I]
4th	?1523	George Monoux	William Shelley	John Hewster (Note: Hewster was also known by the alias of John Brampton.)	William Roche
5th	1529	Sir Thomas Seymour (Note: Seymour resigned his seat, because of ill health, in December 1535. It is unknown who replaced him.)	John Baker [I] (Note: Baker was disqualified upon his resignation as Recorder of London. Sir Roger Cholmley known as Sir Roger Cholmeley was appointed Recorder on 17 June 1534 and by April 1536 he had been elected to Parliament at a by-election.)	John Petyt (Note: Petyt died and was replaced by William Bowyer. The by-election was held by 18 February 1533.)	Paul Withypoll
5th	18 February 1533	Sir Thomas Seymour	John Baker [I]	William Bowyer (Note: Bowyer was disqualified upon election as an Alderman. Robert Pakington was elected to fill the vacancy, at a by-election on 27 October 1534.)	Paul Withypoll
5th	?1534	Sir Thomas Seymour	Sir Roger Cholmley known as Sir Roger Cholmeley	William Bowyer	Paul Withypoll
5th	27 October 1534	Sir Thomas Seymour	Sir Roger Cholmley known as Sir Roger Cholmeley	Robert Pakington	Paul Withypoll
5th	1535	unknown	Sir Roger Cholmley known as Sir Roger Cholmeley	Robert Pakington	Paul Withypoll
6th	1536	unknown	Sir Roger Cholmley known as Sir Roger Cholmeley (Note: Cholmley is known to have been a member of this parliament as he is mentioned in the parliamentary records. His colleagues are unknown however.)	unknown	unknown
7th	1539	Sir Richard Gresham	Sir Roger Cholmley known as Sir Roger Cholmeley	?Richard Fermor (Note: Fermor has been inferred to have been the member, but this is not fully confirmed so the relevant volume of the House of Commons prefixed the name with a question mark.)	Paul Withypoll
8th	1541/42	Sir William Roche	Sir Roger Cholmley known as Sir Roger Cholmeley	John Sturgeon	Nicholas Wilford
9th	19 January 1545	Sir William Roche	Sir Roger Cholmley known as Sir Roger Cholmeley	John Sturgeon	Paul Withypoll
9th	February 1545	Sir William Forman	Sir Roger Cholmley known as Sir Roger Cholmeley	John Sturgeon	Paul Withypoll
9th	February 1545	Sir Richard Gresham (Note: Gresham was elected at a by-election. Sir William Roche had originally been re-elected, but in January 1545 the King ordered that he be replaced. Sir William Forman was elected at a by-election in February 1545, but due to ill-health he was replaced by Gresham.)	Sir Roger Cholmley known as Sir Roger Cholmeley	John Sturgeon	Paul Withypoll
9th	17 November 1545	Sir Richard Gresham	Robert Broke (Note: Broke was elected at a by-election on 17 November 1545, following Sir Roger Cholmeley (who was originally elected) becoming disqualified when he resigned as Recorder of London on his appointment to the senior judicial office of Lord Chief Baron of the Exchequer.)	John Sturgeon	Paul Withypoll

=== Parliaments of King Edward VI of England ===
No.	Summoned	Elected	Assembled	Dissolved
1st	2 August 1547	1547	4 November 1547	15 April 1552
2nd	5 January 1553	1553	1 March 1553	31 March 1553

No	Elected	First member	Second member	Third member	Fourth member
1st	1547	Sir Martin Bowes	Robert Broke	Thomas Curteys (Note: Curteys was disqualified from continuing to serve as a Citizen in Parliament, upon his election as an Alderman. John Blundell was elected to fill the vacancy at a by-election on 4 March 1552.)	Thomas Bacon
1st	4 March 1552	Sir Martin Bowes	Robert Broke	John Blundell	Thomas Bacon
2nd	1553	Sir Martin Bowes	Robert Broke	John Marshe	John Blundell

Note:-

=== Parliaments of Queen Mary I of England ===
No.	Summoned	Elected	Assembled	Dissolved
1st	14 August 1553	1553	5 October 1553	5 December 1553
2nd	17 February 1554	1554	2 April 1554	3 May 1554
3rd	3 October 1554	1554	12 November 1554	16 January 1555
4th	3 September 1555	1555	21 October 1555	9 December 1555
5th	6 December 1557	1557/58	20 January 1558	17 November 1558

No	Elected	First member	Second member	Third member	Fourth member
1st	1553	Sir Rowland Hill	Robert Broke	John Marshe	John Blundell
2nd	1554	Sir Martin Bowes	Robert Broke	John Marshe	John Blundell
3rd	1554	Sir Martin Bowes	Ralph Cholmley	Richard Grafton	Richard Burnell
4th	1555	Sir Martin Bowes	Ralph Cholmley	Philip Bold	Nicholas Chowne
5th	1558	Sir William Garrard	Ralph Cholmley	John Marshe	Richard Grafton

=== Parliaments of Queen Elizabeth I of England ===
No.	Summoned	Elected	Assembled	Dissolved
1st	5 December 1558	9 January 1559	23 January 1559	8 May 1559
2nd	10 November 1562	December 1562	11 January 1563	2 January 1567
3rd	...	March 1571	2 April 1571	29 May 1571
4th	28 March 1572	April 1572	8 May 1572	19 April 1583
5th	12 October 1584	22 October 1584	23 November 1584	14 September 1585
6th	15 September 1586	3 October 1586	15 October 1586	23 March 1587
7th	18 September 1588	1 October 1588	4 February 1589	29 March 1589
8th	4 January 1593	27 November 1592	18 February 1593	10 April 1593
9th	23 August 1597	3 or 4 October 1597	24 October 1597	9 February 1598
10th	11 September 1601	6 October 1601	27 October 1601	19 December 1601

No	Elected	First member	Second member	Third member	Fourth member
1st	9 January 1559	Sir Martin Bowes	Ralph Cholmley	John Marshe	Richard Hills
2nd	December 1562	Sir Martin Bowes	Ralph Cholmley (Note: Cholmley died on 25 April 1563. Sir John White was elected to fill the vacancy at a by-election in October 1566.)	Lawrence Withers	John Marshe
2nd	October 1566	Sir Martin Bowes	Sir John White	Lawrence Withers	John Marshe
3rd	March 1571	Sir John White	Thomas Wilbraham	John Marshe	Thomas Norton
4th	April 1572	Sir Rowland Hayward	William Fleetwood	John Marshe (Note: Marshe died and Thomas Aldersey was elected to fill the vacancy at a by-election on 7 October 1579.)	Thomas Norton
4th	7 October 1579	Sir Rowland Hayward	William Fleetwood	Thomas Aldersey	Thomas Norton
5th	22 October 1584	Sir Nicholas Woodrofe	William Fleetwood	Thomas Aldersey	Walter Fish (Note: Fish died and Henry Billingsley was elected to fill the vacancy at a by-election in September 1585.)
5th	September 1585	Sir Nicholas Woodrofe	William Fleetwood	Thomas Aldersey	Henry Billingsley
6th	3 October 1586	Sir Edward Osborne	William Fleetwood	Thomas Aldersey	Richard Saltonstall
7th	1 October 1588	Sir George Barne	William Fleetwood	Thomas Aldersey	Andrew Palmer
8th	27 November 1592	Sir John Hart	Edward Drew	Andrew Palmer	George Southerton
9th	3 or 4 October 1597	Sir John Hart	John Croke [III]	George Southerton	Thomas Fettiplace
10th	6 October 1601	Sir Stephen Soame	John Croke [III]	Thomas Fettiplace	John Pynder

Notes:-

=== Parliaments of King James I of England ===
No.	Summoned	Elected	Assembled	Dissolved
1st	31 January 1604	1604	19 March 1604	9 February 1611
2nd	...	?1614	5 April 1614	7 June 1614
3rd	13 November 1620	1620/21	16 January 1621	8 February 1622
4th	20 December 1623	1623/24	12 February 1624	27 March 1625

No.	Elected	First member	Second member	Third member	Fourth member
1st	1604	Nicholas Fuller	Sir Henry Montague	Sir Henry Billingsley	Richard Gore
2nd	1614	Nicholas Fuller	Sir Henry Montague	Robert Myddelton	Sir Thomas Lowe
3rd	1621	William Towerson	Robert Heath	Robert Bateman	Sir Thomas Lowe
4th	1624	Sir Thomas Middleton	Heneage Finch	Robert Bateman	Martin Bond

=== Parliaments of King Charles I of England ===
No.	Summoned	Elected	Assembled	Dissolved
1st	2 April 1625	1625	17 May 1625	12 August 1625
2nd	20 December 1625	1625/26	6 February 1626	15 June 1626
3rd	31 January 1628	1628	17 March 1628	10 March 1629
4th	20 February 1640	1640	13 April 1640	5 May 1640
5th	24 September 1640	1640	3 November 1640	16 March 1660

No.	Elected	First member	Second member	Third member	Fourth member
1st	1625	Sir Thomas Middleton	Heneage Finch	Robert Bateman	Martin Bond
2nd	1626	Sir Thomas Middleton	Heneage Finch	Sir Robert Bateman	Sir Maurice Abbot
3rd	1628	Thomas Moulson	Christopher Clitherow	Henry Waller	James Bunce
4th	1640	Thomas Soame	Isaac Pennington	Samuel Vassall	Matthew Cradock
5th	1640	Sir Thomas Soame (excluded 1648)	Isaac Pennington	Samuel Vassall (excluded 1648)	Matthew Cradock (died 1641); John Venn (died 1650)

=== Parliaments of the Commonwealth ===
The Long Parliament or the selection of members from it known as the Rump Parliament functioned de facto during part of the Commonwealth of England period. It existed (in a sense) de jure 1640–1660, as under a pre-English Civil War law, the Long Parliament could not be lawfully dissolved without its own consent which it did not give until 1660. As it was a parliament originally summoned by King Charles I, the overall dates of the Long Parliament are given in the previous section.

The Barebones Parliament was an appointed body, so the city was not an electoral constituency represented as such in it. That body was summoned on 20 June 1653, first met on 4 July 1653 and was dissolved on 12 December 1653.

Year	First member	Second member	Third member	Fourth member	Fifth member	Sixth member	Seventh member
1653	Robert Tichborne	John Ireton	Samuel Moyer	John Stone	Henry Barton	John Langley	Praise-God Barebone

=== Parliaments of the Protectorate ===
During the Protectorate the city was allocated six representatives in the First and the Second Protectorate Parliaments, before reverting to four for the Third Protectorate Parliament.

No.	Summoned	Elected	Assembled	Dissolved
1st	1 June 1654	1654	3 September 1654	22 January 1655
2nd	10 July 1656	1656	17 September 1656	4 February 1658
3rd	9 December 1658	1658/59	27 January 1659	22 April 1659

Year	First member	Second member	Third member	Fourth member	Fifth member	Sixth member
1654	Thomas Adams	Thomas Foote	William Steele	John Langham	Samuel Avery	Andrew Riccard
1656	Thomas Adams	Theophilus Biddulph	Richard Browne	Thomas Foote	Sir Christopher Pack	John Jones
1659	Theophilus Biddulph	Richard Browne	William Thompson	John Jones		

=== Knights and citizens serving 1660–1707 ===
Key to parties: T Tory; W Whig.

From	To	Name	Born	Died
1660	1660	William Wilde	c. 1611	23 November 1679
1660	1660	Richard Browne	c. 1610	24 September 1669
1660	1660	John Robinson	10 January 1615	February 1680
1660	1660	William Vincent	c. 1615	1661
1661	1662	John Fowke	c. 1596	22 April 1662
1661	1679	Sir William Thompson	10 April 1614	c. April 1681
1661	1681	William Love	c. 1620	1 May 1689
1661	1679	John Jones	c. 1610	21 May 1692
1663	1679	Sir John Frederick	25 October 1601	19 March 1685
1679	1681	Sir Robert Clayton	29 September 1629	16 July 1707
1679	1681	Sir Thomas Player	...	14 June 1686
1679	1681	Thomas Pilkington	30 March 1628	16 November 1691
1685	1687	Sir John Moore	11 June 1620	2 June 1702
1685	1687	Sir William Prichard	c. 1632	18 February 1705
1685	1687	Sir Samuel Dashwood	c. 1643	12 August 1705
1685	1687	Sir Peter Rich	c. 1630	26 August 1692
1689	1690	Sir Patience Ward	7 December 1629	10 July 1696
1689	1690	Sir Robert Clayton	29 September 1629	16 July 1707
1689	1689	William Love	c. 1620	1 May 1689
1689	1690	Thomas Pilkington	30 March 1628	16 November 1691
1689	1690	Sir William Ashhurst	26 April 1647	12 January 1720
1690	1695	Sir William Prichard	c. 1632	18 February 1705
1690	1695	Sir Samuel Dashwood	c. 1643	12 August 1705
1690	1693	Sir William Turner	12 September 1615	9 February 1693
1690	1695	Sir Thomas Vernon	10 December 1631	10 February 1711
1693	1701	Sir John Fleet	18 March 1648	6 July 1712
1695	1698	Sir Robert Clayton	29 September 1629	16 July 1707
1695	1702	Sir William Ashhurst	26 April 1647	12 January 1720
1695	1701	Thomas Papillon	6 September 1623	5 May 1702
1698	1701	Sir James Houblon	26 July 1629	October 1700
1701	1702	Sir Robert Clayton	29 September 1629	16 July 1707
1701	1701	Sir William Withers (T)	c. 1654	31 January 1721
1701	1701	Gilbert Heathcote (Note: Expelled)	2 January 1652	25 January 1733
1701	1701	Sir John Fleet	18 March 1648	6 July 1712
1701	1702	Sir Thomas Abney	January 1640	6 February 1722
1701	1707 (Note: Continued in Parliament after the Union took effect on 1 May 1707.)	Sir Gilbert Heathcote	2 January 1652	25 January 1733
1702	1705	Sir William Prichard	c. 1632	18 February 1705
1702	1705	Sir John Fleet	18 March 1648	6 July 1712
1702	1705	Sir Francis Child	14 December 1642	4 October 1713
1705	1707	Sir Robert Clayton	29 September 1629	16 July 1707
1705	1707	Samuel Shepheard	c. 1648	4 January 1719
1705	1707	Sir William Ashhurst	26 April 1647	12 January 1720

Notes:-

- Leigh Rayment's Peerage Pages

== Elections ==
=== Election dates 1660–1710 ===
Dates of general and by-elections from 1660 (excluding some general elections at which no new MP was returned).

- 27 March 1660 GE
- 19 March 1661 GE
- 10 February 1663 BE
- 17 February 1679 GE
- 7 October 1679 GE
- 4 February 1681 GE
- 15 May 1685 GE
- 9 January 1689 GE
- 14 May 1689 BE
- 11 March 1690
- 2 March 1693
- 25 October 1695
- 30 July 1698
- 1 February 1701
- 20 March 1701
- 24 November 1701
- 18 August 1702
- 17 May 1705
- 16 December 1707
- 14 May 1708
- 16 November 1710

=== Election results 1660–1690 ===
General election 27 March 1660: City of London (4 seats)
Party	Candidate	Votes	%	±%
Non partisan	William Wilde	Unopposed	N/A	N/A
Non partisan	Richard Browne	Unopposed	N/A	N/A
Non partisan	John Robinson	Unopposed	N/A	N/A
Non partisan	William Vincent	Unopposed	N/A	N/A

General election 19 March 1661: City of London (4 seats)
Party	Candidate	Votes	%	±%
Non partisan	John Fowke	Elected	N/A	N/A
Non partisan	Sir William Thompson	Elected	N/A	N/A
Non partisan	William Love	Elected	N/A	N/A
Non partisan	John Jones	Elected	N/A	N/A
Non partisan	Sir Richard Ford	Defeated	N/A	N/A

- Death of Fowke 22 April 1662

By-Election 10 February 1663: City of London
Party	Candidate	Votes	%	±%
Non partisan	Sir John Frederick	Unopposed	N/A	N/A
Non partisan hold		Swing	N/A	

General Election 17 February 1679: City of London (4 seats)
Party	Candidate	Votes	%	±%
Non partisan	Sir Robert Clayton	Elected	N/A	N/A
Non partisan	Sir Thomas Player	Elected	N/A	N/A
Non partisan	William Love	Elected	N/A	N/A
Non partisan	Thomas Pilkington	Elected	N/A	N/A
Non partisan	Sir Joseph Sheldon	Defeated	N/A	N/A

General Election 7 October 1679: City of London (4 seats)
Party	Candidate	Votes	%	±%
Non partisan	Sir Robert Clayton	Unopposed	N/A	N/A
Non partisan	Sir Thomas Player	Unopposed	N/A	N/A
Non partisan	William Love	Unopposed	N/A	N/A
Non partisan	Thomas Pilkington	Unopposed	N/A	N/A

General election 15 May 1685: City of London (4 seats)
Party	Candidate	Votes	%	±%
Non partisan	Sir John Moore	Unopposed	N/A	N/A
Non partisan	Sir William Prichard	Unopposed	N/A	N/A
Non partisan	Sir Samuel Dashwood	Unopposed	N/A	N/A
Non partisan	Sir Peter Rich	Unopposed	N/A	N/A

General election 9 January 1689: City of London (4 seats)
Party	Candidate	Votes	%	±%
Non partisan	Sir Patience Ward	Unopposed	N/A	N/A
Non partisan	Sir Robert Clayton	Unopposed	N/A	N/A
Non partisan	William Love	Unopposed	N/A	N/A
Non partisan	Thomas Pilkington	Unopposed	N/A	N/A

- Death of Love 1 May 1689

By-Election 14 May 1689: City of London
Party	Candidate	Votes	%	±%
Non partisan	Sir William Ashhurst	c. 1,700	c. 60.71	N/A
Non partisan	Sir Samuel Dashwood	c. 1,100	c. 39.29	N/A
Majority		c. 600	c. 21.43	N/A
Non partisan hold		Swing	N/A	

== See also ==
- Duration of English parliaments before 1660
- Duration of English, British and United Kingdom parliaments from 1660
- List of parliaments of England
- City of London (UK Parliament constituency)
