= George Monoux =

16th-century English politician

Sir George Monoux

Lord Mayor of London
- In office 1514–1515
- Preceded by: John Tate
- Succeeded by: William Butler

Member of the English Parliament for City of London
- In office 1523–1529
- Preceded by: William Capel; Richard Broke; William Calley; John Kyme
- Succeeded by: Thomas Seymour; John Baker; John Petyt; Paul Withypoll

Personal details
- Born: by 1465
- Died: February 1544 Walthamstow, Essex, Kingdom of England

Sir George Monoux (born in or before 1465; died 1544), born in Walthamstow, Essex, England, was an English merchant in Bristol and London. Six times Master of the Worshipful Company of Drapers, he served as Lord Mayor of London and was an important benefactor in Walthamstow. He was a descendant of John Monoux of Stanford, Worcestershire.

== Career ==
A member of the Drapers Company, Monoux as a merchant traded out of Bristol to France, Spain and Portugal during the late 15th century, and was Mayor of that city in 1501. In 1507 he became alderman for Bassishaw ward in the City of London, and held that ward for 34 years until his death. Serving as Master of the Drapers first in 1508–09, he became Sheriff of London in 1509 and, after two years as auditor, was Lord Mayor of London in 1514. He was again master of his company in 1516–17, 1520–21, 1526–27, 1532–33 and 1539–40. In 1523 he was elected Member of Parliament for the City of London

== Legacy ==
On 15 June 1527 Monoux purchased land for almshouses as well as a school in Walthamstow. He left property worth £50 a year to pay the salaries of a schoolmaster and parish clerk, who were to pray for the souls of Monoux and his wives and to teach up to thirty children. This chantry endowment lasted until 1548 when it was suppressed in the Reformation.

He died in February 1544 and was buried in the Monoux Chapel at St. Mary's Church, Walthamstow. He had married twice: firstly Joan, with whom he had a son and 2 daughters; and secondly Anne, the daughter and coheiress of John Wood of Southwark, Surrey, and the widow of Robert Wattes of London. He left no children.

It is commonly assumed that the pronunciation of his name excludes the 'x'. However, a letter sent to him spells his name 'Monneks', indicating that the 'x' was pronounced. In the 1796 Environs of London, his name is recorded as 'Monox'.

The Monoux School, now Sir George Monoux College, traces its history back to that 1527 endowment as do the Monoux Hall almshouses in Church End, Walthamstow.

== See also ==
- List of Sheriffs of the City of London
- List of Lord Mayors of London
- City of London (elections to the Parliament of England)
