= Hewster =

Hewster is a surname. Notable people with the surname include:

- Adam Hewster (fl. 1520s), also known as John Brampton, MP for Stafford (UK Parliament constituency)
- John Hewster (fl. 1400s), MP City of London (elections to the Parliament of England)

== See also ==
- Fewster
- Hester
