= John de Gisors =

English politician (c. 1279 – 1351)

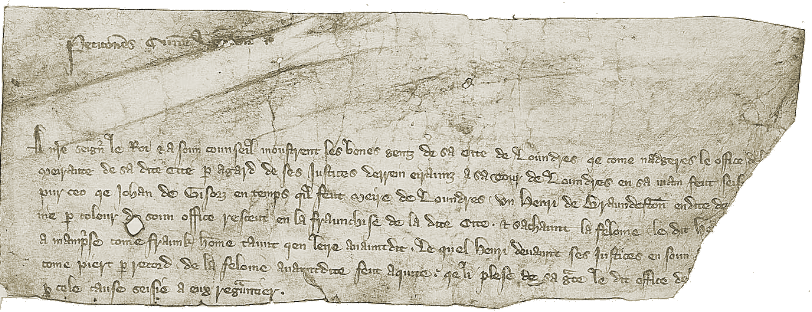

John de Gisors (also Gisorz, Gisorcio or Jessors; c. 1279 – 1351) was an English Member of Parliament. He was a Member (MP) of the Parliament of England for City of London in 1306 and 1310.

== Background ==
Little is known of John de Gisors' youth or upbringing. His family roots may have originally been French although by now they had been established London citizens for around 300 years. Many of his ancestors had played significant roles in the city's governance, as aldermen, and its representation as MPs. Both John's father and grandfather were also named John; the former died in 1282 and the latter in 1296. His father had remained loyal to King Henry III during the Second Barons' War of the 1260s; Both he his father—the first John—were also elected <Ps for London during their careers.

John de Gisors' date of birth is unknown. However, the medievalist Kathryn Warner suggests he could have been "about 60" in 1339, suggesting he lived to be over 70. inheritance made him a wealthy man, and he inherited valuable property in London and Middlesex. This included Gisor's Hall, built by his father. (Note: Situated on Bread Street, its crypt survived until 1852.) While his father and grandfather had both been pepperers by guild, John became a vintner and rentier, His most recent biographer, Elspeth Veale, speculates that he probably lived in St Martin Vintry parish. although how big his trade was has been questioned. The scholar Gwyn A. Williams argues that, in fact, "there is little evidence that [de Gisors] sold any wine at all" and that, at most, he seems to have made around £11 per annum from offering wine cellarage to Gascons.

== Political career ==
=== Relations with the crown and foreign and domestic merchants ===
De Gisors was elected alderman for St Martin Vintry in 1306 at a time of significant political turbulence both in London and nationally. King Edward I died the following year, and his son and successor, Edward II, was unpopular from the start of his reign. Veale ascribes this to "conflicting personalities and shifting interests both in London and the kingdom [which] seriously threatened Edward II's control of his turbulent capital". De Gisors surrendered his post in 1310, but was elected mayor in October the following year; the King had just been forced to surrender to the Lords Ordainer. De Gisors was presented to the King as tradition laid down, on 10 November. This was a period of tension for the city also, and de Gisors was at the forefront of the struggle to keep London from both the King and the rebel lords. Veale argues that he "maintained the traditional protection of London's liberties, defending the franchise, and resisting both levies of tallage and investigation by royal justices of misdeeds of officials". He may also have favoured the Lancastrian opposition by this time, as between 1311 and 1312 he granted the freedom of the city to five of their nominees. However, when the birth of the King's son and heir was proclaimed, he took part in an impromptu celebration at the Guildhall, with many citizens attending; a contemporary described them as having "passed through the city with great glare of torches". He announced that Tuesday to be a public holiday. (Note: "In fact", says Warner, "Londoners 'rested from all work' for an entire week 'for joy at the birth' of their future king".) Conversely, he appears to have been generally unpopular and widely thought to be corrupt; a contemporary French chronicler goes as far as saying that "many people were imprisoned and impoverished" at de Gisors command.

De Gisors was also personally affected by the struggle between crown and nobility. His trade in wine had been damaged when the King granted Gascon merchants favourable terms for trading in London. This impinged on Londoner's own perceived right to pursue a protectionist course, which most of the city agreed on. De Gisor, however, had a personal anti-alien policy, and while Mayor, in 1312, he persuaded the Common Council to pass and enforce several measures intended to regulate mercantile crafts. This was not universally popular and divided the merchants and retailers among themselves. (Note: These reforms did not last much beyond de Gisors' own mayoralty, being withdrawn in 1316.) In June the same year, he prevented one of the King's clerks from building a house in the city—despite the official having been personally granted the land from Edward—on a number of grounds, including that if it caught fire, it could spread to St Paul's Cathedral. The city was further destabilised by mob violence on the streets, which impacted upon de Gisors personally when, in September 1312, it was rumoured that a group of royal household men were planning on having de Gisors arrested and imprisoned. An angry crowd surrounded the Guildhall and refused to disperse until they could see this did not occur; the royalists barely escaped with their lives. The historian Seymour Phillips describes relations between King and city at this time as being "in a delicate state". The following year peace was made between de Gisors' anti-alien faction and the more conservative members of the council led by William de Leyre. In order to quell discontent among the citizens, in 1311 he presided over an assembly of alderman that for the first time codified the principle that the mayor and aldermen were collectively responsible for the citizenry. (Note: In the event, three such assemblies were called, and while all the aldermen attended at least one of them, de Gisors was one of only three to attend all.) He had allowed the reforming party on the council to gain their articles and accepted their pay, and this assembly, in Williams' words, was followed by "followed up with a brisk attack on aliens".

=== Under attack ===
In 1314 de Gisors was elected as MP—along with de Leyre—to attend Parliament in York. By 1320, with the King once again feeling sufficiently confident of subduing his political enemies, de Gisors was one of them. The King dispatched his justices to sit at the Tower of London and hear allegations against the mayor. These included changing the date on the grant of city freedom to let the man—a convicted felon—be bailed, and such accusations of misprision were sufficient for the King to suspend the mayoralty entirely, arrest de Gisors, and appoint a crown official in his place. De Gisors was only released after appearing before Edward" and 'humbly besought on [de Gisors'] knees his grace and goodwill'". This he received, but he was also fined and dismissed as alderman; Natalie Fryde has argued that, with de Gisors' offences going back supposedly seven years, it is more likely that it was the excuse the King needed to take control of the mayoralty for political, rather than judicial, ends. However, by 1319 de Gisors was appointed to a panel of inquisitors instructed to root out Londoners who supported the King's enemies. This resulted in numerous extortion charges, but, most dramatically, the conviction and hanging of Hamo de Chigwell. "This", comments Williams, "was dangerous. The London chroniclers virtually accuse the jury of personal animosity" against him.

This treatment led de Gisors to through in his lot with the King's enemies, led by his wife, Queen Isabella and her lover, Roger Mortimer. Mortimer was imprisoned in the Tower in 1322, but in September the following year de Gisors assisted in his escape to France; de Gisors owned the mill and warehouse that Mortimer hid in before sailing. The King, notes Phillips, "was now paying the price for his interference in London politics". On a local level, in October 1424, de Gisors was questioned over the discovery of a woman's body under a riverside wharf, although it was assumed she probably just fell into the fast flowing river. He returned three years later with Isabelle and an army; entering London, they placed the Tower in de Gisor's holding. In this role he led London's contingent to bring the now-captured King to the deposition parliament in February 1327. However, he had lost his constableship by March, and appears to have renounced public life and civic affairs.

== Personal life ==
De Gisors' mother, Marjorie, is known to have died in July 1305;. He had four brothers — Henry and Anketin, who both also became aldermen and mayors of London, and Thomas and Richard—and four sisters. They were Beatrice, Mabel, Joanne and Isabel.

John de Gisors married twice; firstly, to Isabella, who may have died the year before him, and subsequently to one Alice. His heirs were two granddaughters Margaret and Felicia. (Note: Margaret married Henry Picard, himself elected Mayor of London in 1356 and 1357. She subsequently married Sir Bartholomew Burghersh as his second wife, and lived until 1393. Felicia was wife to Thomas Travers.) He had had three sons—Thomas, Edward and Nichol—and a daughter, Jane. He is known to have outlived his eldest son, Thomas, who had fled into French exile after killing a man in Bread Street in 1326. He made his will on 5 January 1351 and had died by the 19th when it was proven. He left several religious books, including a two-volume missal, a breviary, and a psalter. He bequeathed £100 and property in 13 parishes to Alice, and St Martin's Vintry church for the ordaining of a chantry in his family's name.
