= Abyndon =

Abyndon is a surname. Notable people with the surname include:

- Richard de Abyndon (died 1327), English judge
- Simon de Abyndon (fl. 1310s), English MP
- Stephen de Abyndon (fl. 1312–1321), English MP
