= Fewster =

Fewster is a surname. Notable people with the surname include:

- Artie Fewster (1894–1960), Australian rules footballer
- Bradley Fewster (born 1996), British footballer
- Brendon Fewster (born 1974), Australian rules footballer
- Chick Fewster (1895–1945), American baseball player
- Derek Fewster (born 1962), Swedish-speaking Finnish historian
- George Fewster (1896–1970), Australian politician
- John Fewster (1738–1824), British surgeon and apothecary
- Rachel Fewster, British and New Zealand statistician
