= John Shadworth =

English politician, businessman and alderman

Sir John Shadworth
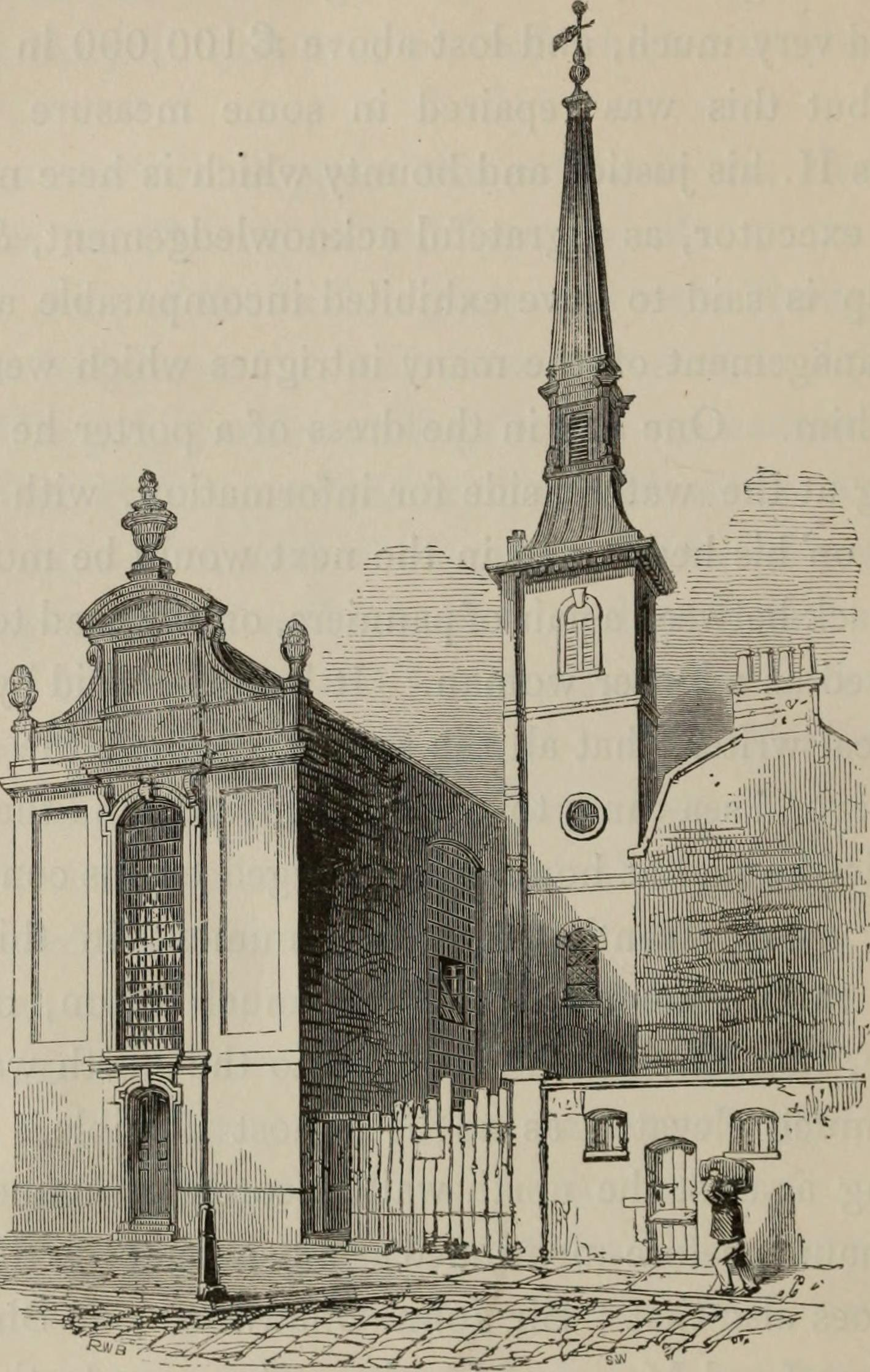
- St Mildred, Bread Street, where Shadworth was buried. Many remains buried there were moved to Brookwood Cemetery in 1898.

Lord Mayor of London
- In office 1401–1402
- Preceded by: John Fraunceys
- Succeeded by: John Walcote

Sheriff of the City of London and Middlesex
- In office 1391–1391 Serving with Henry Vaunere
- Preceded by: John Francis

Personal details
- Died: 7 January 1430– 6 October 1430
- Resting place: St Mildred, Bread Street

Sir John Shadworth, also Chadworth (died between 7 January 1430 and 6 October 1430) was an English politician, businessman, alderman and Sheriff of the City of London who served as Lord Mayor of London.

== Origins ==
He was a member of the Worshipful Company of Mercers of which he would in 1397 be a warden. In 1378 he became a collector of Customs with the future MP John More and would be heavily involved in the wool trade and moneylending and was closely connected with Hanseatic League merchants in London.

Although he may have originally supported populist John Northampton's faction, by 1384 he was part of Nicholas Brembre oligarchic group. He was first elected an MP for the City of London in the Merciless Parliament. After Brembre's execution in that Parliament Shadworth was again an MP in 1390. Shadworth was with Henry Vaunere sheriff during the 1392 Fleet Street riot for which he was deposed and imprisoned at Odiham Castle by Richard II. He is recorded as the City leader who put up the most resistance to Richard's demands.

In April 1398, during Richard's tyranny, he was one of 28 leading figures required to post a £200 bond to appear before the royal council on unspecified matters, and may also have been forced to sign a “blank charter” allowing the king control over his property.

He was elected as an MP in the 1399 Convention Parliament and shortly after appointed to the Henry IV's Royal Council and served as Lord Mayor of London from 1401 to 1402.

== Later career and death ==
There's evidence to suggest that he was influenced by the Lollards although his Catholic will does not reflect this. Shadworth died in 1430 and was buried in a vault in the chancel of St Mildred, Bread Street. Many remains in the church were disinterred and moved to Brookwood Cemetery in 1898.

== See also ==
- List of sheriffs of London
- List of lord mayors of London
- Court of Husting

== Sources ==
- Barron, Caroline; Carlin, Martha; Rosenthal, Joel T. (2017). "Medieval London: Collected Papers of Caroline M. Barron" (PDF). Research in Medieval and Early Modern Culture (9).
- Rawcliffe, Carole (1993). "SHADWORTH, John (d.1430), of London". History of Parliament.
