= Robert Large =

Member of the Parliament of England

Member of the English Parliament for City of London
- In office 1435–1437 Serving with: John Michell; Stephen Forster
- Preceded by: John Welles; John Reynwell; Robert Catworth
- Succeeded by: Henry Frowick; Robert Catworth; Nicholas Yoo

Mayor of London
- In office 1439–1440
- Preceded by: Stephen Browne
- Succeeded by: John Paulet

Personal details
- Died: 1441

Robert Large (died 1441) was a London merchant, a member of the Worshipful Company of Mercers, who was Mayor of London and a Member of Parliament.

He served as one of the Mercers' four yearly wardens in 1427 and was Sheriff of London in 1430-31. In 1437/8, he was the wealthy master to whom the young William Caxton was apprenticed. He was Member of Parliament in 1435 for the City of London as one of the two aldermanic representatives and was elected Lord Mayor in 1439-40.

He died in 1441, and his will was proved in the Prerogative Court of Canterbury.

The publication of a 100-page book about him entitled The Life and Family of Robert Large, mercer: mayor of London 1439-1440 and first employer of William Caxton by David Large was announced in Genealogists' Magazine, journal of the Society of Genealogists, London, volume 29, number 7, September 2008, and was issued by the Foundation for Medieval Genealogy, Oak House, Vowchurch, Hereford HR2 0RB, England.

== See also ==
- List of Sheriffs of the City of London
- List of Lord Mayors of London
- City of London (elections to the Parliament of England)
