= Betoyne =

Betoyne is a surname. Notable people with the surname include:

- William de Betoyne, MP for City of London
- Richard de Betoyne in Parliament of 1327
