= William Hyde =

Willam Hyde may refer to:

== Politicians ==
- William Hyde (high sheriff) (1490–1557), English politician
- William Hyde (died 1403), MP for City of London
- William Hyde (fl.1407), MP for Lewes (UK Parliament constituency)
- William Hyde (MP for Stamford) (1635–1694), MP for Stamford (UK Parliament constituency)

== Others ==
- William Hyde (Douai) (1597–1651), president of the English College, Douai
- William De Witt Hyde (1858–1917), American college president
- William Hyde (journalist) (1836–1898), American journalist
- William Hyde (Utah settler), a Mormon bishop and namesake of Hyde Park, Utah
- William Hyde (artist), 1859–1925, British artist and printmaker

== See also ==
- Bill Hyde, American college football player and coach
- Will Hyde (born 1999), Australian singer, songwriter and producer
