= William Tonge (disambiguation) =

William Tonge is a cricketer.

William Tonge may also refer to:

- William Cottnam Tonge, judge and political figure in Nova Scotia
- William Tonge (MP) for City of London
