= William Chichele =

English politician

William Chichele (died 1426/7) was an English politician. He sat as MP for London in September 1397.

== Offices held ==
He also served as warden of the Grocers' Co. from June 1385 until 1386 and May 1405 until 1406, warden of London Bridge from September 1401 until 1404, alderman of Aldgate Ward by February 1408 until before 20 April 1420, and auditor of London from 21 September 1411 until 1413, commoun councillor of Grocers' Co. by January 1402, sheriff of London and Middlesex from Michaelmas 1409 until 1410, and steward of the liberty of the Archbishop of Canterbury from 30 January 1416 until his death. In 1425, Chichele donated money to a library in Guildhall.

== Family ==
He was the first son of Thomas Chicele (died 1400) and Agnes Pynchoun. He was the brother of Robert Chichele and Henry Chichele, the Archbishop of Canterbury. By February 1390, he married Beatrice and had two sons (one predeceased him), including one named John, and two daughters.
