= John Chaloner =

John Chaloner may refer to:

- John Seymour Chaloner, British-born journalist who founded the German newsweekly Der Spiegel
- John Armstrong Chaloner, American writer and activist
- John Chaloner (MP for City of London)

== See also ==
- John Challoner, secretary of state for Ireland
- John Stopford Challener, British trade union leader
