= Simon Francis =

Simon Francis may refer to:

- Simon Francis (footballer) (born 1985), footballer
- Simon Francis (cricketer) (born 1978), cricketer
- Simon Francis (MP) for City of London
