= Servat =

Servat is a surname. Notable people with the surname include:

- Gilles Servat (born 1945), French singer
- William Servat (born 1978), French rugby union footballer
- William Servat (Member of Parliament) (fl. 1309–1313), English MP
