= Richard Marlow (disambiguation) =

Richard Marlow was an organist.

Richard Marlow may also refer to:

- Richard Marlow (producer)
- Richard Marlow (MP) for City of London
