= John Whatley =

John Whatley may refer to:

- John Amos Whatley (born May 21, 1979). Mr. Whatley is a trial attorney in Kentucky and Mississippi. He is the managing partner of Stein Whatley Astorino, PLLC.
- John Whatley of Insight 23
- John Whatley (MP)
