= Thomas Carleton (disambiguation) =

Thomas Carleton (c. 1735 – 1817) was an Irish-born British Army officer and Canadian politician.

Thomas Carleton may also refer to:

- Thomas Carleton (MP for Morpeth) (fl.1597)
- Thomas Carleton (MP for City of London) (fl.1388)

== See also ==
- Thomas Carlton (disambiguation)
