= Cantelow =

Cantelow is a surname. Notable people with the surname include:

- Thomas Cantelow (c. 1218–1252), English bishop;
- William Cantelow, English MP.
