= Thomas Legge (disambiguation) =

Thomas Legge was a playwright.

Thomas Legge may also refer to:

- Thomas Morison Legge, medical inspector of factories
- Thomas Legge (MP) for City of London

== See also ==
- Thomas Legg, twentieth century civil servant
