= William More (died 1402) =

William More (died 1401/02), was an English merchant and Member of Parliament (MP).

More was a London vintner who is known to have been in business as early as 1369. His family background is unknown though he may have been related to Robert More, another prominent vintner.

He was elected an alderman of the city in 1382-3, then 1384 until circa 1400 and was allied to the victuallers. He also held a number of other civic and royal positions, including appointment as a Sheriff for London and Middlesex, and as the Constable of the Staple of Westminster.

He was a Member of the Parliament of England for the City of London in the Parliaments of 1379, February 1388, January 1390 & November 1390; in the last Parliament he was not the original nominee but was returned at a by-election. It is possible that he also sat in the Parliament of May 1382, but explicit records are not available.

He is last recorded in July 1401, when he loaned £40 to the King, and April 1402, when his will was proven. He had no children and his estates passed entirely to his widow Elizabeth, who remarried Robert Chichele by late 1403.
