= Sir George Monoux =

Sir George Monoux may refer to:

- George Monoux, Sheriff of London, 16th century
- Sir George Monoux College, Walthamstow, London, named after the above
