= William Trent (disambiguation) =

William Trent (1715–1787) was an American fur trader and merchant.

William Trent may also refer to:

- William Trent (Trenton) (c. 1653–1724), founder of Trenton, New Jersey
- William Peterfield Trent (1862–1939), American academic
- William Edward Trent (1874–1948), British architect
- William J. Trent (1910–1993), African-American economist, non-profit director and civil rights activist

== See also ==
- William Trent House in Trenton, New Jersey
- William Trente (fl. 1309–1316), Member of the Parliament of England
- William Trent Rossell (1849–1919), Engineer Commissioner of the District of Columbia
