= John Blundell =

John Blundell may refer to:

- John Blundell (actor), British actor
- John Blundell (economist) (1952–2014), British economist and Director-General of the Institute of Economic Affairs
- John Blundell (MP) (died 1559), English politician
