= Walter Gawtron =

English politician (died 1433)

Walter Gawtron (died 1433) was an English politician and draper. He sat as MP for London in 1410, February 1413, May 1413, Middlesex in 1417, 1423 and London again in 1427 and 1429.

He also served as collector of the wool custom in London from 26 July 1410 till 21 January 1411, keeper of the cocket seal from 26 July till 9 November 1411, auditor of London from 21 September 1410 till 1411, 1413 till 1414 and commissioner of array in Middlesex in May 1418, and commissioner to raise a royal loan in November 1419.

He was the son of the London draper John Gawtron by his wife Agnes (died 1408). By February 1410, he married Joan, the daughter of John Walcote and widow of Walter King (died 1407), they had one son. By March 1433, he married his second wife, Alice, the widow of Geoffrey Dalling (fl. 1426).
