= John Higham =

John Higham is the name of

- John Higham (Australian politician) (1856–1927), Western Australian Legislative Assembly Member
- John Higham (historian) (1920–2003), American historian
- John Sharp Higham (1857-1932), British politician
- John Higham (MP for City of London) (died c.1442)
