= John Gedney =

John Gedney may refer to:

- John Gedney (MP for City of London) (died 1449)
- John B. Gedney, US politician
- John Gedney, one of the Three Tramps
