= Richard Fleming =

Richard Fleming may refer to:

- Richard Fleming (bishop) (c. 1385–1431), English clergyman and bishop of Lincoln
- Richard Fleming (priest), Dean of Ontario
- Richard Fleming (Coronation Street), a fictional character on the British television show Coronation Street
- Richard E. Fleming (1917–1942), United States Marine Corps officer and Medal of Honor recipient
- Richard Fleming (MP for City of London) in 1459
- Richard Fleming (MP for Southampton), in 1715, MP for Southampton (UK Parliament constituency)
