= Richard Goslyn =

English politician (died c. 1428)

Richard Goslyn (died c. 1428) was an English politician. He sat as MP for London in May 1421.

He also served as sheriff of London and Middlesex between Michaelmas 1421 till 1422 and alderman of Castle Baynard ward from 21 April 1423 till after 13 October 1428.

He married a woman called Rose and had probably one son. By March 1414, he married Beatrice, the daughter of Thomas Knolles and had five sons and two daughters.
