= Andrew Aubrey =

English merchant and politician

Andrew Aubrey (died c. 1356) was an English merchant and politician, who served three terms as Lord Mayor of London during the reign of Edward III.

Born the son of Roger and Denise Aubrey, he became a pepper factor and a member of the Guild of Pepperers, later the Worshipful Company of Grocers. Aubrey was elected one of the Sheriffs of London in 1331, served as an alderman from 1333 to 1355, and was elected mayor in 1339, 1340, and 1351. As alderman, he first represented Bread Street Ward, but in 1345 he removed to Cordwainer, where he served until his resignation in 1355. He was elected Member of Parliament for the City of London, as one of the two aldermanic representatives, in 1338 and 1340.

During one of his terms as mayor, while he was charged with keeping the peace during the king's absence abroad, Aubrey put down a riot that had broken out due to conflict between the fishmongers and skinners. During the tumult, one of the ringleaders wounded one of the mayor's officers, while another seized Aubrey himself and threatened him with a sword. Aubrey had both men, along with five other rioters, beheaded without trial and their heads mounted on London Bridge. Not only was Aubrey not punished for his actions, he was congratulated by the king, on the grounds that an assault on the king's officers was the same as an assault on the king's own person.

Andrew Aubrey married a daughter of Robert le Bret, a London goldsmith who served as alderman in the 1330s. One of his children, John Aubrey, married Matilda, daughter of Adam Fraunceys, who was Lord Mayor ten years after Andrew Aubrey. After John's death, his widow married John Montacute, who later became the Earl of Salisbury.

== See also ==
- List of Lord Mayors of London
- City of London (elections to the Parliament of England)
