= William Standon =

Member of the Parliament of England

William Standon (died 1410), of Wimpole, Cambridgeshire and London, was Sheriff and Mayor of London and a Member of Parliament.

He was the son of John Standon and his wife Elizabeth. He held a number of public appointments such as buyer for the King's household (1378–1396) and tax collector for London (1382) and served on a number of Commissions.

A member of the Worshipful Company of Grocers, he became an Alderman of London and acted as Sheriff of London in 1386 and Mayor of London in 1392 and 1407.

He was a Member (MP) of the Parliament of England for City of London 1391, 1394, January 1397, January 1404 and 1406, and for Cambridgeshire in October 1404.

He married three times; firstly Elizabeth, secondly Agnes and thirdly another Agnes, the daughter and eventual coheiress of Sir Adam Francis and widow of Thomas Basings (d. 1400) of Kenardington, Kent. They had one daughter.

== See also ==
- List of Sheriffs of the City of London
- List of Lord Mayors of London
- City of London (elections to the Parliament of England)
