= Walter de Finchingfeld =

English MP

Walter de Finchingfeld was an English Member of Parliament (MP).

He was a Member of the Parliament of England for City of London in 1291.
