= Ralph Verney (MP for City of London) =

Sir Ralph Verney (fl. 1459), was an English Member of Parliament (MP).

He was a Member of the Parliament of England for City of London in 1459. He was Lord Mayor of London in 1465 and was knighted by King Edward IV in 1471 in recognition of the City's loyalty and subsequently received several grants of land. He married a widow, Emma Pyking, and purchased the manor of Middle Claydon. Varney died in 1478.

== See also ==
- Verney family of Middle Claydon
