= William Oliver (MP for City of London) =

William Oliver (died 1432/3), was an English Member of Parliament (MP).

He was a Member of the Parliament of England for City of London in November 1414.
