= John Warde (mayor fl.1485) =

John Warde was an English Member of Parliament (MP).

He was a Member of the Parliament of England for City of London in 1467.
