= William Roche (mayor) =

Mayor of London and MP (bef.1478–1549)

William Roche (by 1478–1549), of London and Havering-atte-Bower, Essex, was an English Member of Parliament (MP).

He was a Member of the Parliament of England for City of London in 1523 and 1542.

Roche held the manors of Nelmes, Hornchurch and Gobions, Romford in Havering-atte-Bower.
