= Richard de la Pole (14th-century MP) =

English Member of Parliament

Sir Richard de la Pole (died 1 August 1345) was an English merchant, crown financier, and politician. Operating from Kingston upon Hull and London, he served as a Member of Parliament for Hull in 1322 and 1327 and the City of London in 1332.

== Origins and merchant career ==
De la Pole was the eldest son of William de la Pole and his wife Elena, daughter of John Rotenheryng. Operating primarily from Kingston upon Hull, Richard and his brother William entered into the English wool trade, establishing a commercial network stretching across the North Sea to the County of Flanders, importing wine and exporting wool. Richard and William leveraged their accrued riches to serve as bankers to the English crown. During the upheaval from the deposition of Edward II and accession of Edward III, they used substantial loans to finance England's military campaigns. Whilst William remained in banking, Richard diverted his capital to land ownership.

== Public office ==
In 1319, de la Pole was serving as attorney for the King's butler at Hull, and by 1320, he was collector of customs at Hull's docks. He entered the English Parliament as the MP for Hull, elected in May 1322 and again in September 1327. With benefit from his royal favour, de la Pole was lucratively appointed Chief Butler to Edward III, charging him with household supplies. He was dismissed in 1338.

In 1330, de la Pole shifted his civic and political career directly to London, serving until 1340 as an Alderman of the City of London. Two years later, he was elected to Parliament for the City, representing their mercantile elite. He additionally served on a commission of "oyer and terminer" in Leicestershire and a guardian for the peace in Derbyshire. For his valuable financial support during the early phases of the Hundred Years' War, Edward III knighted de la Pole in 1340.

== Family ==
De la Pole married a woman named Joan, and with her had two sons and three daughters:

- William de la Pole, married Margaret Peverel, daughter of Edmund Peverel.
- John de la Pole
- Joan de la Pole, married Ralph Basset of Weldon, Northamptonshire.
- Elizabeth (or Isabel) de la Pole, a nun.
- Margaret de la Pole

== Death and estates ==
Sir Richard died on 1 August 1345 at his manor of Milton in Northamptonshire. He was buried in the Trinity Chapel in Hull. His financial success ensured the future prominence of his family, as his brother William was, as the father of Michael de la Pole, 1st Earl of Suffolk, progenitor of the Earls and Dukes of Suffolk.

Parliament of England
Preceded by John de Grantham; Reginald de Conduit; Stephen de Abyngdon	Member of Parliament for City of London; 1332; With: Anketin de Gisors; Reginald de Conduit; John de Caustone	Succeeded by Reginald de Conduit; John de Caustone; Roger de Depeham
