= John Butler (MP for City of London) =

English politician

John Butler (died 1423), of London, was an English politician.

He was a member (MP) of the parliament of England for London in 1417.
