= John Pecche =

Member of the Parliament of England

John Pecche (1332–1380) was a 14th-century merchant who was a Sheriff of London in 1352, Lord Mayor of London for 1361–62 and a Member of Parliament for four annual terms between 1361 and 1372.

Pecche was a successful merchant and member of the influential Fishmongers who accumulated landed estates spread through half a dozen counties including Kent, Surrey, Cambridgeshire and Middlesex and substantial properties in three parishes in the city of London.

Granted by Edward III a monopoly of the sale of sweet wines in London in 1373 he was impeached for taking on each pipe a levy of 3s.4d. (16p.) for himself as well as 10s. (50p.) for the Exchequer. The impeachment arose partly from a dispute between rival merchants and partly from an attack by the House of Commons on the policies of the Court. In August 1376 Pecche lost his rank as an alderman and his freedom of the City. Pecche was a feudal tenant of John of Gaunt and also had business dealings with him and Gaunt's influence gained John Pecche a royal pardon together with Parliament's reversal of the judgment in January 1377. However he was not taken back into favour by the Civic authorities.

His son by his first wife, Ellen, was William Pecche (1359–1399). His widow, his wife Mary, married Sir William Moigne.

== See also ==
- List of Sheriffs of the City of London
- List of Lord Mayors of London
- City of London (elections to the Parliament of England)

Civic offices
Preceded by John Wroth	Lord Mayor of the City of London; 1361	Succeeded by Stephen Cavendisshe
