= William Holbech (MP for City of London) =

William Holbech (fl. 1358–1367), was an English Member of Parliament (MP).

He was a Member of the Parliament of England for City of London in 1358 and 1367.
