= Hugh Short =

English politician

Hugh Short (fl. 1380–1399) was an English politician. He sat as MP for London in January 1397.

He also served as alderman of Bread Street Ward by 21 September 1397 till c. 1399 and auditor of London from 21 September 1397 till 1398.
