= John Little (MP) =

John Little (fl. 1352), was an English Member of Parliament (MP).

He was a Member of the Parliament of England for City of London in 1352.
