= John Lovekyn =

Member of the Parliament of England

Sir John Lovekyn (fl. 1342–1366) was a City of London stockfishmonger who was three times Lord Mayor of London.

He was Warden of London Bridge from 1342 to 1350 and became an alderman of the city in 1347. He served as Sheriff of the City of London in 1342 and first became Lord Mayor in 1348, and was elected to a second term in 1358. His third term was more unexpected. On 28 October 1365, Adam de Bury was elected Lord Mayor by the Aldermen of the City. However, on 28 January 1366, de Bury was removed from office and John Lovekyn was elected Mayor by order of King Edward III.

The Lovekyn chapel in Kingston upon Thames was founded by his father Edward in 1309. John Lovekyn made an endowment to the chapel in 1352. In 1561 the chapel was repurposed as a grammar school.

He was elected Member of Parliament as one of the two aldermanic representatives for the City of London in 1344, 1346 and twice in 1348.

== See also ==
- List of Sheriffs of the City of London
- List of Lord Mayors of London
- City of London (elections to the Parliament of England)
- Kingston Grammar School
