= Henry Halton =

English politician (died 1415)

Henry Halton (died 1415) was an English politician. He sat as MP for London in 1410.

He also served as Warden of the Grocers' Co. from 14 May 1398 until 21 May 1399 and 29 May 1401 until 1402, the latter period alongside Robert Hackstone. He served as tax collector of London in March 1401, controller of a subsidy in London in March 1404, alderman of Broad Street Ward by 5 July 1407 until before 20 July 1408 and Longbourn Ward by 20 November 1408 until his death, and sheriff of London and Middlesex from Michaelmas 1407 until 1408.

He was the son of John Halton by his wife Denise. Before September 1403, he married Margery, the widow of John Osbarn, a London fishmonger and they had three sons and three daughters.
