= William Weston (MP for City of London) =

William Weston (died c. 1427, of London), was an English Member of Parliament (MP).

He was a Member of the Parliament of England for City of London in March 1416.
