= William Sunningwell =

English politician (died 1400)

William Sunningwell (died 1400) was an English politician. He sat as MP for London in 1399.

He also served as warden of the Mercers' Co. from 24 June 1395 till 1396, and 1400 till his death that year.

He married a woman named Alice and probably had no children.
