= John Perneys =

English politician (died 1434)

John Perneys (died 1434) was an English politician. He sat as MP for London in October 1416 and Mayor of London from 13 October 1432 till 1433.

He also served as alderman of Castle Baynard Ward from 18 December 1416 till circa. 1423, Lime Street Ward from circa. 1423 till his death, auditor of London from 21 September 1417 till 1418, sheriff of London and Middlesex from 12 October 1418 till Michaelmas 1419, tax collector of London in December 1421, October 1422 and April 1428.

He was the son of John Perneys by his wife Alice. He married a woman called Joan (died 1434) and had at least two sons.
