= Hugh Ryebread =

English politician

Hugh Ryebread (died 1414) was an English politician. He sat as MP for London in 1406.

Before October 1404, he married a woman called Joan and they had no children.
