= John Warde (mayor fl.1375) =

English Member of Parliament

John Warde (fl. 1300s), was an English Member of Parliament (MP).

He was a Member of the Parliament of England for City of London in 1369.
