= Drugo Barentyn =

English goldsmith and politician

Sir Drugo Barentyn (died 14 December 1415), sometimes spelled as "Drew", "Dru", "Barentine" or "Barrington", was an English goldsmith and politician who sat as MP for London in 1395, September 1397, January 1404, 1410, February 1413, and May 1413 and mayor of London from 13 October 1398 till 1399, and 1408 till 1409.

Barentyn came from a family of Norman French extraction. His ancestors had been seigneurs of Rozel in western Normandy, before coming to England two generations before his birth. Barentyn was a successful goldsmith and merchant. He held the position of court jeweler during the reigns of Richard II and Henry IV.

He was one of the Sheriffs of London in 1393, serving with Richard Whittington. He was first elected Lord Mayor of London in 1398. His first term of office coincided with the conflict culminating in the overthrow of King Richard II by King Henry IV. At the beginning of the term, Barentyn was made to swear an oath on behalf of the city's citizens upholding the banishment of Henry Bolingbroke (the future Henry IV); later in his term, he was entrusted with discreetly transporting the deposed Richard II to the Tower of London.

In 1400, he was issued a letter of marque to avenge the loss of a cargo of French wine to pirates. He resided near Goldsmiths' Hall, which he rebuilt in 1407. He was elected Lord Mayor a second time in 1408.

Barentyn died in 1415. He was buried in the Goldsmith's guild church of St John Zachary. In his will he donated "faire lands" to the Goldsmiths' Company in 1415.
