= John Welles (MP for City of London) =

Former English Member of Parliament

John Welles (died 1442), was an English Member of Parliament (MP).

He was a Member of the Parliament of England for City of London in 1417, 1423, 1425, 1426, 1427 and 1433.
