= William Mitchell (MP for City of London) =

William Mitchell (died 1426), was an English Member of Parliament (MP).

He was a Member of the Parliament of England for City of London in 1415.
