= Robert Tate (MP) =

Robert Tate (fl. 1483–1503), was an English Member of Parliament (MP).

He was a Member of the Parliament of England for City of London in 1483, 1501 and 1503.
