= John Sutton (MP for City of London) =

John Sutton (died 1415), was an English Member of Parliament (MP).

He was a Member of the Parliament of England for City of London in 1411.
