= John Pyel =

Member of the Parliament of England

- Born: 1310
- Died: 1382 (aged 71–72)
- Known for: Mayor of London

John Pyel (born c. 1310 – 1382) was a London merchant who was elected Mayor of London in 1372.

== Biography ==
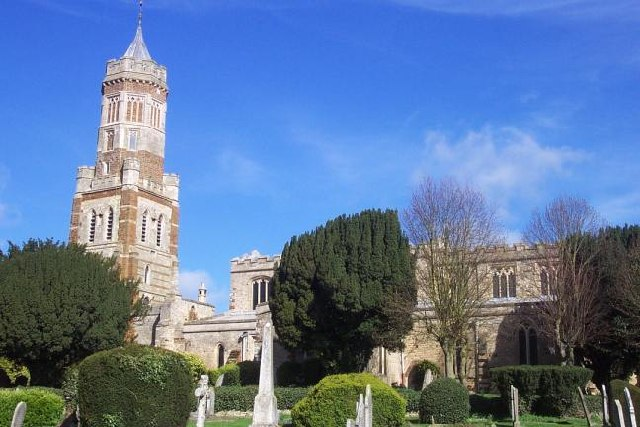
Church of St Peter, Irthlingborough

He was born circa 1310 in Irthlingborough, Northamptonshire and inherited land there from his father, which he added to during his lifetime. In 1353 he purchased the manor of Irthlingborough from Sir Simon de Drayton. His brother Henry became Archdeacon of Northampton.

He became a merchant in London, served from 1369 as an Alderman of Castle Baynard ward, was Sheriff of London in 1369 and elected Mayor of London in 1372. He was elected Member of Parliament for the City of London in 1361 and 1376 as one of the two aldermanic representatives of the city.

In 1375 he obtained a royal licence to found the college of St. Peter, Irthlingborough, a college for six secular canons — one of whom should be dean — and four clerks, but died before his intention was actually carried out. The design, involving the development of the local parish church into a chantry college, was eventually accomplished with the help of the Archdeacon of London by his widow, Joan, in 1388.

In 1349, a person of this name was serving as a royal official, in Chesterton, Cambridgeshire.

== Death ==
He died in 1382. He had married Joan and had two sons. A memorial to him can be found in the John Pyel Chapel of St. Peters Church, Irthlingborough on the south side of the main altar.

== Joan Pyel and Irthlingborough College ==
Probably born between 1330 and 1335, Joan was marriage to John Pyel by 1349. Between 1373 and 1377 Joan is named jointly in John’s land acquisitions in London and Northamptonshire. In the late 1370s, John moved to Irthlingborough while Joan remained in the city. They had two sons, John and Nicholas, whose upbringing was entrusted to John’s successor Nicholas Brembre, indicating that Joan spent much of her life living apart from her husband and sons.

In 1373 John Pyel had begun an attempt to found a college in Irthlingborough, but this was delayed by opposition from the bishop of Lincoln, John Bokyngham, and was incomplete at the time of John Pyel’s death in May 1382. Joan restarted the process in 1383, acquiring a new papal confirmation from Pope Urban VI and circumventing Bokyngham by directing the papal confirmation to the archdeacon of London instead, on the basis of John Pyel’s London citizenship. The archdeacon confirmed the endowment despite Bokyngham's refusal to attend an enquiry about it in January 1387. Joan also acquired letters patent from the crown in March 1388 at her personal expense, allowing Irthlingborough College to be founded in February 1393.

Joan, who seems never to have left London, continued to live at her house in Broad Street, St Bartholomew the Less. Her later life is characterised by piety, choosing her confessor and supporting religious foundations. Her considerable wealth was mostly left to St Helen’s Bishopsgate on her death in 1421. A monument to John and Joan Pyel is in Irthlingborough Church, commemorating their foundation of Irthlingborough College, which remained in operation until 1848.

== See also ==
- List of Sheriffs of the City of London
- List of Lord Mayors of London
- City of London (elections to the Parliament of England)
