= William Marchford =

English politician

William Marchford (died 1413/14) was an English politician. He sat as MP for London in January 1404, 1407, February 1413, and May 1413.

He also served as Warden of the Mercers' Co. from 24 June 1394 till 1395, 1400 till 1401, 1406 till 1407, and 1412 till 1413, auditor of London from 21 September 1395 till 1396, and tax collector of London in December 1406.

He was the son of Robert Marchford by his wife Isabel. He married his first wife, Katherine and with her, he had possibly one son and one daughter. By March 1406, he married his second wife, Alice, the widow of a draper named Thomas Walyngton (died 1403) and they had one son.
