= Thomas Carlton =

Thomas Carlton may refer to:

- Thomas Carlton (mayor), mayor of Frederick, Maryland
- Tom Carlton, a cricketer in New Zealand and Australia from 1909 to 1932

== See also ==
- Thomas Carleton (disambiguation)
