= John Organ (MP) =

John Organ (fl. 1368–1386), was an English Member of Parliament (MP).

He was a Member of the Parliament of England for City of London in 1377, 1380, 1384 and 1386.
