= John Brydges (died 1530) =

John Brydges or Brugges (by 1470–1530), of London, was an English Member of Parliament (MP).

He was a Member of the Parliament of England for City of London in 1510.
