= Thomas Exton (MP for City of London) =

English Member of Parliament (MP)

Thomas Exton (died 1420), was an English Member of Parliament (MP).

He was a Member of the Parliament of England for City of London in 1394.
