= William Waldern =

English politician (died 1424)

William Waldern (died May 1424) was an English politician. He sat as MP for London in November 1414, 1415, and May 1421 and Mayor of London from 13 October 1412 till 1413 and 1422 till 1423.

== Offices held ==
He also served as warden of the Mercers' Co. from 24 June 1398 till 1399, 1404 till 1405, 1410 till 1411, 1418 till 1419, alderman of Bread Street Ward from c. 1399 till 1415, Bassishaw Ward by 8 April 1415 till his death, sheriff of London and Middlesex from Michaelmas 1399 till 1400, collector of an aid in London in December 1401, collector of customs and subsidies in Southampton from 12 November 1402 till 18 December 1404, tax collector of London in November 1404, ambassador to treat for a truce with Burgundy from 13 April 1410 or 1411, and mayor of the Staple of Westminster from 29 March 1423 till his death and the Staple of Calais by 27 April 1423.

He also served as commissioner of oyer and terminer in London in November 1403, February 1404, December 1417, June 1418, and January 1424, commissioner of inquiry in December 1410, January 1414 concerning Lollards at large, February 1424 concerning treasons and felonies, commissioner of goal delivery in November 1412, May 1413, January 1423, commissioner to provide labour for royal building work at Westminster Abbey in London and Middlesex in August and November 1413.

== Family ==
He was the son of Geoffrey Waldern. By March 1398, he married a woman named Juliana. By September 1413, he married a woman named Margaret (died December 1426), the daughter of John Clerk (died 1413/14) and they had two sons and three daughters.
