= Nicholas Wilford =

English politician

Nicholas Wilford (c. 1495–1551) was an English politician. He sat as MP for London in 1542 till 1544.

He also served as auditor of London from 1545 till 1547.

He was the fifth son of James Wilford and Elizabeth, the daughter of John Bettenham. In 1529, he married Elizabeth, the daughter of Thomas Gale and had four sons and five daughters.
