= Robert Haxton =

English politician

Robert Haxton (fl. 1398–1414) was an English politician. He sat as MP for London in October 1404.

He also served as warden of the Grocers' Co. in London from 29 May 1401 till 1402.

He married a woman called Joan.
