= Richard Meryvale =

English politician (died 1437)

Richard Meryvale (died 1437) was an English politician. He sat as MP for London in 1419.

He also served as auditor of London from 21 September 1418 till 1419.

He married a woman called Agnes.
