= Thomas Knollys =

English businessman and Lord Mayor of London, died 1435

Sir Thomas Knollys
- Arms of Knollys

Lord Mayor of London
- In office 1410–1410
- Preceded by: Richard Marlowe
- Succeeded by: Robert Chichele

Member of the English Parliament for City of London
- In office October 1416 – 1417 Serving with: Richard Whittington; John Perneys; Robert Whittingham

Personal details
- Born: c. 1350
- Died: 1435
- Resting place: St. Antholin's

Sir Thomas Knollys or Knolles (died 1435) was an English businessman in London who was active in both local and national government.

== Origins ==
Born about 1350, he was once thought to be descended from the soldier Sir Robert Knollys but modern sources give his father as Richard. There were obviously close links with Sir Robert, who named Thomas as one of his executors in 1389.

== Career ==
Before 1387 he had become a member of the Grocers' Company, which he served as warden and as master, contributing to the building of their new hall in Poultry and to the rebuilding of the guild church of St. Antholin in Watling Street, where he lived. In addition to his main business interests in goods and properties, he also became a major financier, lending extensively to other businessmen and to the government.

In local government, he was an alderman by 1393, Sheriff of London in 1394 and twice served as Lord Mayor in 1399 and in 1410, in his second term being responsible for rebuilding the Guildhall.

In two brief royal appointments, he was collector of customs duties on wool for London in 1400 and joint treasurer of war finances in 1404. In October 1416 he became an MP for the City of London as one of the two aldermanic representatives.

In addition to his London properties, in 1391 he bought and later extended a country estate at North Mimms in Hertfordshire. After 1484, upon the death of his grandson Robert without sons, moieties of the property were inherited by Robert's two daughters: Anne who married Henry Frowick, and Elizabeth the wife of James Stracheley.

He was buried in St Antholin's beside his wife and his will made on 20 May 1435 was proved on 11 July 1435 at Lambeth.

== Family ==
By 1371 he had married Joan (died 1431) who in their sixty years together had nineteen children, of whom four sons and three daughters survived their father. His eldest son Thomas (died 1446), who inherited his businesses and properties, was through his younger son Richard the ancestor of the courtier Sir Francis Knollys.

== See also ==
- Knollys family
- List of Sheriffs of the City of London
- List of Lord Mayors of London
- City of London (elections to the Parliament of England)
