= St. Anthony's Hospital, St Benet Fink =

Medieval hospital in London, England

Coordinates: 51.514307°N 0.085517°W

St. Anthony's Hospital was a medieval charitable house in the parish of St Benet Fink in the City of London. It was founded before 1254 as a cell by the Hospital Brothers of St. Anthony of Vienne in France.

== Location ==
The hospital of St. Anthony when mentioned later was certainly in the now defunct parish of St. Benet Fink (an abbreviation of "St Benedict Finch"), near today's Threadneedle Street. However, it is unlikely a synagogue had ever occupied a site in the parish of St. Benet Fink, as such Jewish places of worship were confined to the Jewry district of the City, some distance away to the east. It is possible therefore that either the brothers changed their quarters afterwards or at one time the Jews had spread beyond the Jewry. Such an outlying synagogue may have been permitted by the 1252/3 decree of King Henry III (1216-1272) that there should be no synagogues except where they existed during the reign of his father King John (1199–1216).

== Establishment and funding ==
The brothers of St. Anthony of Vienne established a cell before 1254 on some land given to them by King Henry III, in a place previously occupied by a Jewish synagogue. In the bull of Pope Alexander V confirming the grant the place is not further described.

The house was founded to look after twelve poor men, and was governed by a Master, two priests and a schoolmaster.

The hospital appears to have been funded by ad hoc donations of alms, not by an endowment, as in 1291 the whole property within the parish of St. Benet Fink was not worth more than the small sum of 8 shillings per annum.

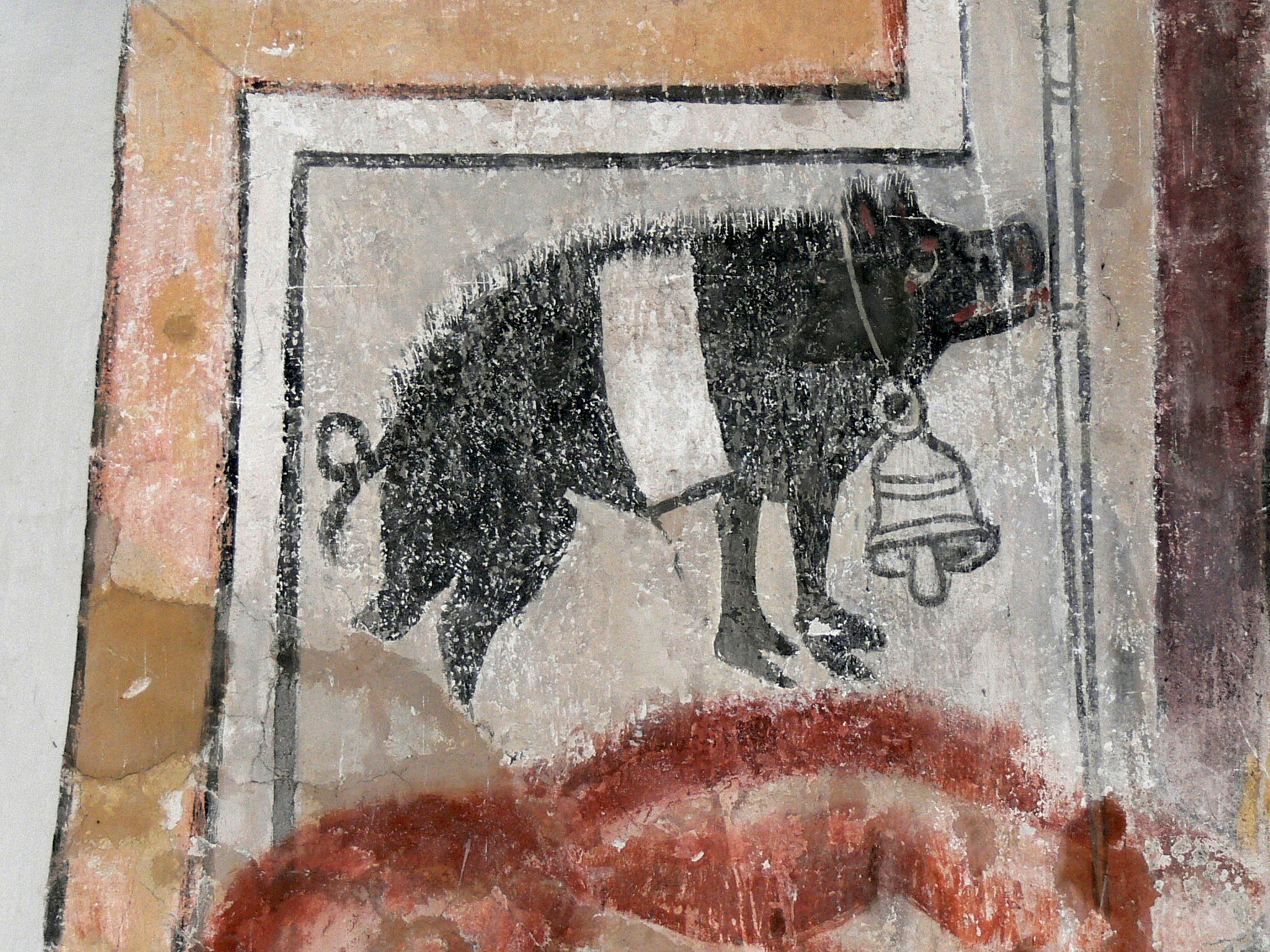
A St Anthony's belled pig, fresco circa 1300, Saint Matthew's Church, Murau in Styria, Austria

One source of income, traditional to certain religious foundations dedicated to Saint Anthony the Great of Egypt, was from donated free-range pigs: any pig considered by the supervisor of the London Livestock market unfit to be killed for food was reserved for the use of the Hospital as follows: a proctor of St. Anthony's placed a collar around its neck from which hung a bell. It was then released onto the City streets to scavenge, protected by the status afforded by its bell, from molestation by the population. it was a virtuous deed to feed these pigs, which quickly fattened and when ready for the table were reclaimed by the Hospital and sold or slaughtered for food. The privilege appears on occasion to have been abused, as in 1311 one of the Hospital's tenants Roger de Wynchester, was forced to promise the City authorities not to claim pigs found wandering about the City, nor to put bells on "any swine but those given in charity to the house".

== History ==
In 1310 the brothers built a new chapel, for which they had neglected to obtain the permission of the Bishop of London. Judgement was given against the brothers in August, 1311, in the Court of Arches, when the chapel was judged to be prejudicial to the Bishop and to the parish church of St. Benet Fink, and was to be reduced to the form of a private house within eight days on pain of greater excommunication.

During the wars with France and the schism the hospital was cut off from communication with the parent house at Vienne. In 1380 the warden Geoffrey de Lymonia was excused by the antipope Clement VII from making contributions due to Vienne. In 1389 King Edward III appointed as warden one of his clerks, John Macclesfield, in place of the papal choice for the position. Pope Boniface IX confirmed his appointment on condition he should become a monk within three months, which on his failure so to do resulted in the pope making his own appointment. The pope later relented and allowed Macclesfield to hold the position for ten years.

The hospital was by then virtually a royal "free chapel" and this may account for the benefits conferred on it by Pope Boniface IX. In 1392 he granted 100 days' remission of penance to those who during seven years should visit the "House of St. Anthony" on the chief festivals connected with Jesus, the Virgin Mary, and St. Anthony, and gave alms towards the fabric of the chapel and for the maintenance of the sick and poor. In 1392 he also gave it the revenues of All Saints Church, Hereford, and of the annexed chapel of St. Martin, which had been given to the house at Vienne in 1249 by King Henry III.

Shortly before 1400 the advowson of St. Benet Fink's parish church had been donated to the Hospital by two Citizens of London, John Sauvage and Thomas Walington, and in that year the pope donated in addition that church's revenues to the Hospital. However, as later disputes between the church and Hospital attest this grant was not put into effect. In 1440 St. Benet's Church was again donated to the hospital by the Bishop of London for the maintenance of a grammar school.

Macclesfield had in fact misappropriated the Hospital's funds by disposing of much of its property and by the granting of pensions to his children, and other persons, and in 1424 the pope ordered the bishop of Winchester to annul such alienations as should be found unlawful. (fn. 24)

In 1429 the Master acquired adjoining land from the Abbot of St. Albans and enlarged the building and formed a garden and cemetery. The new building was uncompleted in 1441, and the Hospital was then described by King Henry VI as "wretched and almost desolate, reduced to the very verge of poverty".

In 1442 King Henry VI granted to the Hospital the manor of Pennington with pensions in Milburn, Tunworth, Charlton, and Up-Wimborne, Hampshire, in order to maintain five scholars at Oxford University, who were first to study grammar at his royal foundation of Eton College. In 1449 a bequest was made by the will of William Wyse of his brewery "Le Coupe super le hoop" in the parish of Allhallows London Wall, for the purpose of maintaining a priest to instruct the children of St. Anthony's in singing as well as praying for his soul.

== Alien Priory ==
During the French wars in 1414 the Alien Priories Act was signed by King Henry V which confiscated into the king's hands the English property of all French mother-houses, and the Hospital was treated henceforth as a royal free chapel. Later King Henry VI appointed the wardens and King Edward IV on two occasions granted to a third party the right to present a Master on the next vacancy. The popes evidently acquiesced with the royal confiscation as in 1446 Pope Eugenius IV gave leave to the bishops of Worcester and Norwich, the Provost of Eton and the Warden William Say, to make statutes for the Hospital and in 1447 Pope Nicholas V exempted the Hospital from all spiritual and temporal jurisdiction, especially from that of the former mother-house of St. Anthony, Vienne.

The Hospital did not exist for long as an independent house and in 1475 was annexed and appropriated to the College of St. George, Windsor Castle. It was at that time a profitable enterprise, with receipts in 1478–9 of £539 19 shillings exceeding expenses by £96 4 shillings 10 pence. "From the accounts it may be gathered that the surplus was not obtained by stinting the inmates of food".

Largely due to financing by Sir John Tate, an Alderman of the City of London, the church was rebuilt in 1499 on the old now enlarged site.

St. Anthony's pigs still existed in 1525 and in 1537 an agent of St. Anthony's was recorded collecting offerings and selling hallowed bells for cattle.

== Dissolution of the Monasteries ==
At the time of the Dissolution of the Monasteries the Hospital was despoiled, not as was usual by the crown, but by a prebendary of Windsor named Johnson, who gave each almsman in compensation for the loss of his room a weekly pension of 1 shilling. During the reign of Queen Elizabeth I (1558-1603) the church was let to French Protestants.

== Landholdings ==
In 1565 the Hospital possessed lands including the following: :

- Manor of Esehall (earlier spelled as "Esthall")
- Manor of Walens (earlier spelled as "Valance")
- Manor of Fryslyng (earlier spelled as "Thyrstelyng")
- 'Jurdens land' in Essex;
- Rectories of All Saints and St. Martin in the City of Hereford, in the possession of the house since 1392
- A tenement in Winchester,
- A tenement in Portsmouth,
- Tenements in the City of London, including three tenements near the school, and the capital messuage, called 'Lady Tate's House,' then tenanted by Sir Henry Sydney and the Rectory of St. Benet Fink.

== Stowe's Survey of London ==
John Stow (1524–1605) in his 1598 Survey of London wrote of St Anthony's Hospital thus:

"Some distance west from this the Merchant-Tailors' Hall is Finke's Lane, so called of Robert Finke, and Robert Finke his son, James Finke, and Rosamond Finke. Robert Finke the elder new built the parish church of St. Bennet, commonly called Fink, of the founder; his tenements were both of St. Bennet's parish and St. Martin's Oteswich parish. The one half of this Finke lane is of Brode Street ward, to wit, on the west side up to the great and principal house wherein the said Finke dwelt; but on the other side, namely the east, not so much successive confirmation, by inspeximus, of Henry VIII, Edward VI, Philip and Mary, Elizabeth, and James I towards Comhill. Then without this lane in the aforesaid Threeneedle Street is the said parish church of St. Bennet, a proper church, in which are these monuments of the dead: Robert Simson, and Elizabeth his wife; Roger Strange, esquire; Trerisse; William Coolby; John Frey; Thomas Briar, plumber, 1410, &c. Some distance west is the Royal Exchange, whereof more shall be spoken in the ward of Cornhill, and so down to the little conduit, called the pissing conduit, by the Stockes Market, and this is the south side of Threeneedle Street. On the north side of this street, from over against the east corner of St. Martin's Oteswich church, have ye divers fair and large houses till ye come to the hospital of St. Anthonie, sometime a cell to St. Anthonie's of Vienna. For I read that King Henry III granted to the brotherhood of St. Anthonie of Vienna, a place amongst the Jews, which was sometime their synagogue, and had been built by them about the year 1231; but the Christians obtained of the king that it should be dedicated to our Blessed Lady; and since a hospital being there built, was called St. Anthonie's in London; it was founded in the parish of St. Bennet Finke, for a master, two priests, one schoolmaster, and twelve poor men: after which foundation, amongst other things, was given to this hospital, one messuage and garden, whereon was built the fair large free school, and one other parcel of ground, containing thirty-seven feet in length, and eighteen feet in breadth, whereon was built the alms houses of hard stone and timber, in the reign of Henry VI, which said Henry VI, in the 20th of his reign, gave unto John Carpenter, D.D., master of St. Anthonie's hospital, and to his brethren and their successors for ever, his manor of Ponington, with the appurtenances, with certain pensions and portions of Milburne, Burnworth, Charlton, and Up Wimboroe, in the county of Southampton, towards the maintenance of five scholars in the University of Oxford, to be brought up in the faculty of arts, after the rate of ten pence the week for every scholar, so that the said scholars shall be first instructed in the rudiments of grammar at the College of Eaton, founded by the said king. In the year 1474, Edward IV granted to William Say, B.D., master of the said hospital, to have priests, clerks, scholars, poor men, and brethren of the same, clerks, or laymen, choristers, proctors, messengers, servants in household, and other things whatsoever, like as the prior and convent of St. Anthonie's of Vienna, &c. He also annexed, united, and appropriated the said hospital unto the collegiate church of St. George in Windsor. The proctors of this house were to collect the benevolence of charitable persons towards the building and supporting thereof. And amongst other things observed in my youth, I remember that the officers charged with oversight of the markets in this city, did divers times take from the market people, pigs starved, or otherwise unwholesome for man's sustenance; these they slit in the ear. One of the proctors for St. Anthonie's tied a bell about the neck, and let it feed on the dunghills; no man would hurt or take them up, but if any gave to them bread, or other feeding, such would they know, watch for, and daily follow, whining till they had somewhat given them; whereupon was raised a proverb, "Such an one will follow such an one, and whine as it were an Authonie pig"; but if such a pig grew to be fat, and came to good liking (as ofttimes they did), then the proctor would take him up to the use of the hospital. In the year 1499, Sir John Tate, sometime ale-brewer, then a mercer, caused his brewhouse, called the Swan, near adjoining to the said free chapel, college, or hospital of St. Anthonie, to be taken down for the enlarging of the church, which was then new built, toward the building whereof the said Tate gave great sums of money, and finished in the year 1501. Sir John Tate deceased 1514, and was there buried under a fair monument by him prepared. Dr. Tayler, Master of the Rolls, and other. Walter Champion, draper, one of the sheriffs of London 1529, was buried there, and gave to the beadmen twenty pounds. The lands by year of this hospital were valued in the 37th year of Henry VIII to be fifty-five pounds six shillings and eight pence. One Johnson (a schoolmaster of the famous free-school there) became a prebend of Windsor, and then by little and little followed the spoil of this hospital. He first dissolved the choir, conveyed the plate and ornaments, then the bells, and lastly put out the almsmen from their houses, appointing them portions of twelve pence the week to each (but now I hear of no such matter performed), their houses with other be letten out for rent, and the church is a preaching place for the French nation. This school was commended in the reign of Henry VI, and sithence commended above other, but now decayed, and come to nothing, by taking that from it what thereunto belonged".

This goodly foundation having a free schoole and almes houses for poore men (builded of hard stone) adjoyning to the west end of the church, was of olde time confirmed by Henry the Sixt, in the year 1447. The outward work of this new church was finished in the year 1501, the said John Tate deceased about the year 1514, and was there buried in a monument by him prepared, as appeareth by an indenture tripartite made between the said John Tate, the Deane of Windsor, and William Milbourn, chamberlaine." (Stow, 1st edition, p. 145).

Thom's editorial comment: Pigs have long been placed under the protection of St. Anthony. "The bristled hogges doth Anthonie preserve and cherish well," says Barnabe Googe in The Popish Kingdom, fol. 95. And in The World of Wonders is the following epigram upon the subject:

"Once fed'st thou, Anthony, an herd of swine,
And now an herd of monkes thou feedest still;
For wit and gut alike both charges bin;
Both loven filth alike; both like to fill
Their greedy paunch alike. Nor was that kind
More beastly, sottish, swinish, than this last,
All else agrees; one fault I only find —
Thou feedest not thy monks with oaken mast."

A very curious illustration of the custom recorded by Stow is to be found in Bale's comedy of Thre Lawes, 1538, where Infidelity begins his address: " Good Christen people, I'm come hyther verelye as a true proctour of the howse of S. Antonye." And boasts, among other charms: " Lo here is a belle to hange upon your hogge, and save your cattel from the bytynge of a dogge".

== Walter Thornbury's description ==
Walter Thornbury in his Old and New London (1872), wrote as follows:

"St. Benedict's," says Maitland, "is vulgarly Bennet Fink. Though this church is at present a donative, it was anciently a rectory, in the gift of the noble family of Nevil, who probably conferred the name upon the neighbouring hospital of St. Anthony." Newcourt (died 1716), who lived near St. Benet Fink, says the monks of the Order of St. Anthony hard by were so importunate in their requests for alms that they would threaten those who refused them with St. Anthony's fire and that timid people were in the habit of presenting them with fat pigs, in order to retain their good-will. Their pigs thus became numerous, and, as they were allowed to roam about for food, led to the proverb, "He will follow you like a St. Anthony's pig." Stow accounts for the number of these pigs in another way, by saying that when pigs were seized in the markets by the City officers, as ill-fed or unwholesome, the monks took possession of them, and tying a bell about their neck, allowed them to stroll about on the dunghills, until they became fit for food, when they were claimed for the convent".

== List of Masters ==
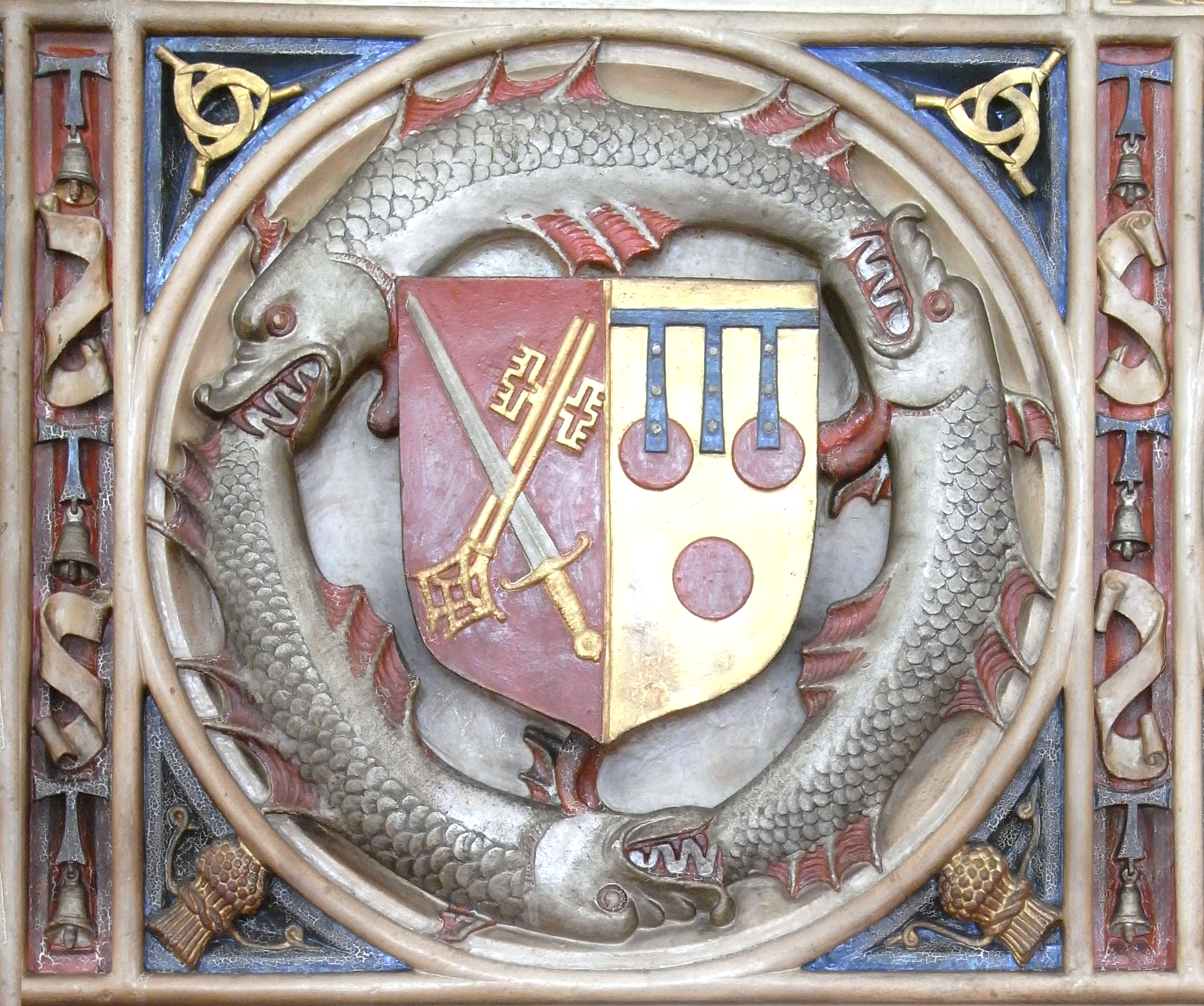
Detail from the Courtenay Chimneypiece in the Bishop's Palace, Exeter, erected by Peter Courtenay (c.1432-1492), Bishop of Exeter, Bishop of Winchester and Master of St Anthony's Hospital. In the margin on each side of the escutcheon of the See of Winchester impaling arms of Courtenay, are shown three Tau crosses with pendant bells, a symbol of Saint Anthony of Egypt, a reference to Courtenay's mastership from 1470

The following served as masters of St Anthony's Hospital:

- Reymund de Basterneys (?), occurs 1287
- John, occurs 1311
- Geoffrey de Lymonia, occurs 1380
- John Savage, occurs 1382
- Richard Brighous, occurs 1385 and 1389
- John Macclesfield, appointed 1389, occurs 1417
- Adam de Olton, appointed 1423, occurs 1424
- John Snell, appointed 1431, occurs 1432
- John Carpenter, S.T.P., occurs 1434, 1440, resigned 1444
- Walter Lyhert, appointed 1444
- William Say, S.T.B., occurs 1446, 1449, and 1463
- Peter Courtenay (c.1432-1492), appointed 1470, later Bishop of Exeter and Bishop of Winchester. The surviving Courtenay Chimneypiece he erected in the Bishop's Palace, Exeter, shows in the margin on each side of the escutcheon of the See of Winchester impaling arms of Courtenay, three Tau crosses with pendant bells, a symbol of Saint Anthony of Egypt, a reference to Courtenay's mastership from 1470.
- Richard Surlond, occurs 1499 and 1501–2
- Roger Lupton (died 1540), Provost of Eton College (1503/4-1535), occurs 1509–10. His coat of arms (Argent, on a chevron between three wolf's heads erased sable three lilies argent on a chief gules a Tau cross between two escallops or) incorporated a Tau cross, one of the symbols of St Anthony.
- John Chambre, occurs 1521–2
- Anthony Baker, occurs 1545

== Sources ==
- Victoria County History, Volume 1, London Within the Bars, Westminster and Southwark, ed. William Page, London, 1909, pp. 581–584: Alien Houses: Hospital of St Anthony'
