= John Clenhand =

English politician

John Clenhand (died between 14 June and 5 November 1390) was an English politician. He sat as MP for London in September 1388.

He also served as constable of the Staple of Westminster from 15 July 1383 till 1388, common councillor of Broad Street Ward by July 1384 till after August 1388, auditor of London from 21 September 1387 till 1388, and ambassador to treat for a truce with Flanders on 20 May 1388.

He married a woman named Cecily and had no children. He married his second wife Idonea Lovey (died 12 September 1409) and had three sons.
