= John Bryan (MP for City of London) =

John Bryan (died 1418), was an English Member of Parliament (MP).

He was a Member of the Parliament of England for City of London in 1407.
