= Geoffrey de Northampton =

Geoffrey de Northampton (fl. 1300), was an English Member of Parliament (MP).

He was a Member of the Parliament of England for City of London in 1300.
