= Stephen Fabyan =

English Member of Parliament

Stephen Fabian (or Fabyan) was an English member of Parliament for City of London in 1469, 1470 and 1472.
