= Simon Sewall =

English politician (died 1429/1430)

Simon Sewall (died 1429/1430) was an English politician. He sat as MP for London in 1419.

He also served as tax collector of London in December 1417 and common councillor of Aldersgate Ward by 11 January 1422.

By January 1406, he married Alice, the widow of Ralph Freeman (died 1405). His second wife, Alice, was the widow of John Goldyng and with her he had one son and one daughter.
