= Roger de Palmer =

Roger de Palmer, was an English Member of Parliament (MP).

He was a Member of the Parliament of England for City of London in 1316 and 1318.
