= John Wroth (MP for City of London) =

John Wroth (fl. 1358), was an English Member of Parliament (MP).

He was a Member of the Parliament of England for City of London in 1358.
