= William Parker (died 1403) =

William Parker (died 1403), was an English Member of Parliament (MP).

He was a Member of the Parliament of England for City of London in 1402.
