= Thomas Fauconer =

English politician

Thomas Fauconer (died 1434) was an English politician. He sat as MP for London in 1411, March 1416, 1420, December 1421, 1422 and 1423 and served as Mayor of London from 13 October 1414 till 1415.

He served as alderman of Coleman Street Ward by July 1402 till after 20 July 1414 and Cheap Ward by 10 January 1415 till after 21 September 1434.

He also served as Warden of the Mercers' Co. from 24 June 1398 till 1399, 1405 till 1406, 1411 till 1412, 1417 till 1418, and 1423 till 1424, tax collector of London in December 1402, Sheriff of London and Middlesex from 1403 till 1404, and collector of customs and subsidies in Southampton from 1 October 1405 till 20 February 1407, Boston from 24 July 1407 till 28 January 1409 and of the wool custom in London from 13 February 1412 till 28 February 1416.

He was the son of John Fauconer. By 1411, he married a woman named Philippa and had two daughters (one predeceased him).
