= John Rote =

English Member of Parliament

John Rote (fl. 1387–1389), was an English member of parliament (MP).

In the 10th year of the reign of King Richard II of England, Rote attempted to stop the beating and maltreatment of a barber, a John Elyngham, by a William Hulot or William Hughlot, a shield bearer, who then after attacked Rote, who would have been killed had he not defended himself. William Hulot or William Hughlot was intended to be punished by having his right hand cut off, however, his punishment was changed the moment it was to be executed.

He was a member of the Parliament of England for the City of London in 1389.
