= John de Bureford =

John de Bureford (fl. 1321), was an English Member of Parliament (MP).

He was a Member of the Parliament of England for City of London in 1321.
