= Geoffrey Waldern =

English politician

Geoffrey Waldern (died circa. 1396) was an English politician. He sat as MP for London in 1395.

He also served as common councillor for Cordwainer Street Ward from 1381 till after July 1385 and auditor of London from 21 September 1390 till 1391, and 1394 till 1395.

He married a woman named Cecily.
