= Adam le Blund de Fulham =

English Member of Parliament

Adam le Blund de Fulham (fl. 1291), was an English Member of Parliament (MP).

He was a Member of the Parliament of England for City of London in 1291.
