= William Calley (MP) =

English MP of London (by 1461–1515)

William Calley (by 1461–1515), was an English Member of Parliament (MP).

He was a Member of the Parliament of England for City of London in 1512 and 1515.
