= William Sheringham =

English politician

William Sheringham (died between 24 July and 25 November 1397) was an English politician. He sat as MP for London in 1391.

He served as alderman of Bishopgate Ward from 12 March 1383 till 1384, Bread Street Ward from 1388 till his death in 1397.

He also served as common councillor for Bread Street Ward in October 1384 and from 1385 till 1386, auditor of London from 21 September 1392 till 1393 and 1394 till 1395, tax collector of London in November 1386 and March 1395, warden of the Mercers' Co. from June 1391 till 1394, commissioner of inquiry in London in March 1393, and sheriff of London and Middlesex from Michaelmas 1395 till 1396.

He married a woman called Maud and probably had no children.
