= Robert Whittingham =

English politician

Sir Robert Whittingham (died 1452) was an English merchant and politician. He sat as MP for London in October 1416 and Hertfordshire in 1432.

== Offices held ==
He also served as warden of the Drapers' Co. from possibly August 1416 till after 29 July 1417, alderman of Bishopsgate Ward from 22 December 1417 till 1422, Walbrook Ward from 1422 till 2 May 1438, auditor of London from 21 September 1418 till 1419 and 1424 till 1425, sheriff of London and Middlesex from Michaelmas 1419 till 1420, sheriff of Essex and Hertfordshire from 5 November 1433 till 3 November 1434 and 3 November 1438 till 5 November 1439.

He also served as commissioner of oyer and terminer in Buckinghamshire and Hertfordshire in March and July 1430 concerning oppressions and extortions, and in January 1448 concerning a maritime case, commissioner to assess a tax in Buckinghamshire in April 1431 and in London in January 1436, commissioner to lease land in the Duchy of Cornwall in July 1434, commissioner to raise a royal loan in Hertfordshire in March 1442, commissioner of inquiry in Bedfordshire in May 1444 concerning riots at Dunstable and in Hertfordshire and Middlesex concerning theft of deeds.

He also served as receiver-general of the Duchy of Cornwall from 21 March 1433 till 4 November 1439, to the English estates of John, Duke of Bedford by 10 September 1435, to the late duke's estates and other crown property from 6 February 1436 till 5 May 1438.

He also served as Justice of the Peace for Hertfordshire from 4 August 1433 till November 1439, 4 December 1433 till July 1445 and Buckinghamshire from c. 1445 till October 1449, treasurer of Calais from 10 February 1436 till 25 December 1441, keeper of the mint at Calais from 18 February 1436 till possibly 25 December 1441.

He also served as ambassador to treat with envoys from Holland and Zeeland from 23 November 1438, 14 July 1441, from Flanders and Brabant from 23 November 1438, 23 May, and 23 December 1439, from France 23 May 1439, 23 April, 2 May, 3 November 1440, 22 May 1441, from France and Burgundy on 24 June 1440 and from Burgundy alone on 11 July 1440.

He also served as Mayor of the Staple of Calais by 14 May 1439 till before September 1442 and captain of Hammes Castle, Picardy by 9 April 1445 till before 20 November 1449.

== Family ==
He was the son of Alan Whittingham. By 1420, he married Agnes (died 1456), the daughter of Richard Buckland and they had at least four sons. He was knighted by July 1445.
