= John Mitchell (MP for City of London) =

Mitchell John

John Mitchell (died 1445), was an English Member of Parliament (MP).

He was a Member of the Parliament of England for City of London in 1411, 1420, 1422, 1426, 1427 and 1435.
