= William Baret =

English politician

William Baret (died autumn 1411) was an English politician. He sat as MP for London in 1381, October 1383, and February 1388.

He served as alderman of Aldgate Ward from 12 March 1377 till 1378, Lime Street Ward from 1379 till 1380, Waldbrook Ward from 1381 till 1382, Cornhill Ward from 1383 till 1384, Tower Ward from 1390 till before March 1394. In 1377, Baret's home was attacked by Paul de Salesbury, who demanded ownership of the building. He was joined by a group of armed men. In 1381, de Salesbury was indicted as a rebel during the Peasants' Revolt.

He also served as tax collector of London in March 1377, May 1384 and December 1384, Sheriff of London and Middlesex from Michaelmas 1379 till 1380, supervisor of the collection of murage in London in March 1387, common councillor for Queenhithe Ward in October 1384 and April 1385 till 1387, and as auditor of London from 21 September 1378 till 1379, and 1392 till 1393.

Before June 1381, he married Eleanor (died 1401), who was probably the daughter and co-heiress of Sir Hugh Baddow (died by Michaelmas 1382). They had no children.
