= John Sudbury (MP) =

15th-century English member of parliament

John Sudbury (died 1425), was an English Member of Parliament (MP).

He was a Member of the Parliament of England for City of London in 1406.
