= Alan Everard =

English politician

Alan Everard (died c. 1426) was an English politician. He sat as MP for London in October 1404 and April 1414.

He also served as warden of the Mercers' Co. from 24 June 1396 till 1397, 1403 till 1404, and 1411 till 1412, auditor of London from 21 September 1399 till 1400, 1411 till 1413, alderman of Bread Street Ward by 7 July 1415 till February 1418, sheriff of London and Middlesex from Michaelmas 1415 till 1416, and commissioner of oyer and terminer in London in December 1417.

He was the son of William Everard. By November 1403, he married Elizabeth (died 1427), a kinswoman of William Otes.
