= John Woodcock (mayor) =

Member of the Parliament of England

Sir John Woodcock (sometimes Wodcock or Wodecok; died 1409) was an English merchant and politician. He held several offices over the course of his life, including Lord Mayor of London, and exercised considerable influence during the reigns of both Richard II and Henry IV. One of the richest Londoners of his time, he lent large sums to both those rulers.

Woodcock was a native of Doncaster in Yorkshire, but he relocated to London sometime prior to 1382, when he (along with Richard Whittington) was called to value pearls before the Lord Mayor's court. He became a common councillor of Cripplegate Ward in 1388, and Auditor of London in 1390. In 1397 he became an alderman, first of Coleman Street Ward (until 1402) and then of Cripplegate Ward. He was one of the Sheriffs of the City of London during Richard Whittington's second mayoral term, alongside William Askham. He was elected mayor himself in 1405, following Sir John Hende, after a single term in Parliament (the so-called "Unlearned Parliament" of 1404). During his term as mayor, he ordered the destruction of all the weirs on the Thames below Staines, owing to the threat they posed to navigation. At the close of his term, he instituted the practice that the outgoing mayor, along with the aldermen and "as many as possible of the wealthier and more substantial commoners of the city", should attend a Mass with music at the guildhall; this marked the first recorded inclusion of music in London mayoral elections, and was given credit by contemporaries for the filling of the office without dispute.

Woodcock built a sizeable fortune supplying the households of several powerful patrons, most notably King Richard II, but also including the king's nephew Thomas Holland, 1st Duke of Surrey, his uncle John of Gaunt, and the Earl of Derby (the future King Henry IV). His attachment to Derby led to his entanglement in the Lords Appellant affair, for which he was later pardoned by Richard II. He was one of the leading citizens of London sent to meet with the king during his conflict with the City in 1392, after which the king revoked the city's liberties and appointed new leadership. His long relationship with the Earl of Derby proved advantageous when the latter seized the throne as King Henry IV. The new king gave significant preference to Woodcock, including paying debts owed him by the former king and others (including Thomas Mowbray, executed in 1405).

Woodcock married Felicity Austyn, daughter of another mercer, Thomas Austyn. They had four children, two sons and two daughters. He died in 1409, leaving a sizeable fortune to his wife and children, and was buried at St Alban, Wood Street. A gentry family of Lancashire claimed, in the Visitation of 1683, to be descended from him.
