= Robert Ashcombe =

English politician

Robert Aschcombe (died c. 1417) was an English politician. He sat as MP for London in September 1397.

He also served as common councillor in London from 9 August 1376 until sometime after 21 September 1396, auditor of London from 21 September 1396 till 1397, and the King's embroiderer from 8 December 1396 till c. September 1399.

He married a woman named Joan.
