= William Burton (MP for City of London) =

English Member of Parliament

William Burton (died 1438), was an English Member of Parliament (MP).

He was a Member of the Parliament of England for City of London in April 1414 and May 1421.

Details of his origins and early life are unclear. There is information that in 1395 he acted as chief manager for another member of his livery company. He played a leading role in the affairs of this, one of the city's most powerful guilds, for the next 38 years.

During his service at the court, he held the positions of purveyor and sergeant of the king's spices. William Burton served four terms as a director of the Grocers' Company and at least three on the advisory board. He was involved in numerous court processes.

Burton invested part of his wealth in real estate. He was the owner of apartments and shops in the London parishes of St. Bride, Fleet Street, St. Mary Colechurch and St. Mildred in the Poultry.

His property in the city was worth 12 pounds a year in 1436. He married three times. Burton was a member of numerous juries and participated in 8 parliamentary elections.

He died between 10 March and 23 May 1438 and was buried in the church of the Friars Minor next to his second wife, Agnes.
