= Adam Carlisle =

English politician

Adam Carlisle (died between January 1399 and September 1400) was an English politician. He sat as MP for London in 1373, 1376, October 1377, 1379, 1386, January 1390 and 1395.

By 1363, Carlisle worked as a grocer and apothecary in the city, and was one of London's richest men. He also served as joint surveyor of the Grocers' Mystery, Cheap Ward in November 1365, commissioner of inquiry in London in September 1370 concerning usury, auditor of London from 21 September 1379 until 1380 and 1381 until 1382, common councillor of Broad Street Ward from 11 June 1384 until 1386, Sheriff of London and Middlesex from Michaelmas 1388 until 1389, and Mayor of the Staple of Westminster from 7 July 1393 until 3 July 1397.

He also served as alderman of Bishopgate Ward from 12 March 1377 till 1378, Broad Street Ward from 1379 until 1380 and 1381 until 16 August 1382, Aldgate Ward in 1390, 1391 and 1393, and Cornhill Ward from 1384 until after 12 February 1396.

Before November 1376, he married a woman named Agnes. Before November 1377, he married a woman named Alice and had two daughters.
