= William Norton (MP for City of London) =

English Member of Parliament

William Norton (died 1439/40), was an English Member of Parliament (MP). He was a Member of the Parliament of England for City of London in 1402.
