= John Wade (MP for City of London) =

English parliament member

John Wade (fl. 1394) was an English Member of Parliament in the Parliament of England for City of London in 1394.
