= William Brampton =

English politician

William Brampton (died 1406) was an English politician. He sat as MP for London in January 1390, 1391, January 1397, 1399, and October 1404.

He served as alderman of Bridge Ward from 12 March 1390 till his death in 1406.

He also served as common councillor of Fishmongers' Mystery from 1381 till 1382, bailiff of Southwark until 20 July 1382, Governor of the Staple of Middleburg from 24 January 1384 till 2 February 1389, searcher for illegal exports of bullion through the Staple on 20 April 1384, commissioner of inquiry in Middleburg in March 1387, Sheriff of London and Middlesex from Michaelmas 1394 till 1395, Mayor of the Staple of Westminster from 3 July 1397 till 1402, member of the royal council from 1 November 1399 till 18 July 1400, and lieutenant to Thomas, Lord Berkeley before 2 November 1405.

He also served as ambassador to treat for a truce with Albert of Bavaria, Count of Holland on 14 December 1382, ambassador for a commercial treaty with Albert of Bavaria on 3 September 1388, ambassador to treat generally with the merchants of the Hanse on 13 May 1403, ambassador with Prussia and the Hanseatic towns from May 1405 till March 1406, ambassador with the High Master of the Teutonic Order on 14 November 1406, envoy to Middleburg and Ghent in March 1384.

He married his first wife and possibly had one son with her. Before June 1405, he married his second wife Alice (died 1417), the sister of John Chesterfield, a chaplain.
