= Simon de Abyndon =

Simon de Abyndon (fl. 1310s), was an English Member of Parliament (MP).

He was a Member of the Parliament of England for City of London in 1316.
