= Solomon Oxney =

English politician (died 1433)

Solomon Oxney (died between 18 June and 25 July 1433) was an English politician. He sat as MP for London in 1419 and 1420. In May 1420, Oxney was made a warden of the Goldsmith's Mistery.

He was the brother of Giles Oxney (who died by 1409) and John Oxney (died circa. 1412). By January 1403, he married Cecily, the widow of Thomas Boner (died 1397). He married his second wife Alice who died in 1432.
