= John Whatley (MP) =

John Whatley (died c. 1430), was an English Member of Parliament (MP).

He was a Member of the Parliament of England for City of London in December 1421.
