= John Higham (MP for City of London) =

John Higham (died c. 1442), of London, was an English Member of Parliament (MP).

He was a Member of the Parliament of England for City of London in 1420, 1426 and 1431.
