= Henry de Durham =

Henry de Durham (fl. 1307–1315), was an English Member of Parliament (MP).

He was a Member of the Parliament of England for City of London in 1307, 1309, and 1315.
