= John Reynwell =

Member of the Parliament of England

Sir John Reynwell (also spelt Rainwell; died 1445) was Lord Mayor of London.

== Career ==
Reynwell was a City of London fishmonger. He prospered in his trade, became a Sheriff of London in 1412, Lord Mayor of London in 1426–27 and was knighted. In 1427 he started work on a new gate and drawbridge in an undocumented part of the city. He was Member of Parliament for the City of London in 1410, 1415, 1433 and 1445 as one of the two aldermanic representatives.

== Coat of arms ==
Reynwell's arms were a chevron between three dolphins embowed. This design reflected the arms of the ancient Guild of Fishmongers, similar to those of the present Worshipful Company of Fishmongers (see that article - and whoever originally entered this text used the name of Askham, another Lord Mayor, not Reynwell, so this may be in error).

== See also ==
- List of Sheriffs of London
- List of Lord Mayors of London
- City of London (elections to the Parliament of England)
