= Thomas Carleton (MP for City of London) =

Thomas Carleton (fl. 1380s), was an Alderman of the City of London and an English Member of Parliament (MP).

He was a Member of the Parliament of England for the City of London from 1382.

He was an alderman for Cripplegate ward in 1382–3. He was again elected as an alderman, this time for Coleman Street Ward, in March 1388, but did not live to complete his term of office.

He is described as a broderer, which probably means he was a member of the Worshipful Company of Broderers (or its predecessor).
