= William de Betoyne =

William de Betoyne (fl. 1288), was an English Member of Parliament (MP).

He was a Member of the Parliament of England for City of London in 1288.
