= William Hyde (died 1403) =

William Hyde (died 1403), was an English Member of Parliament (MP).

He was a Member of the Parliament of England for City of London in 1397.
