= Henry Vanner =

Henry Vanner (or Vaunere) was a Vintner and an MP for the City of London and also was a Sheriff of the City of London during the Fleet Street riot.

== Sources ==
- Rawcliffe, Carole (1993). "VANNER, Henry (d.1395), of London". The History of Parliament. Vol. The House of Commons 1386–1421. Boydell and Brewer.
