= John Petyt =

English politician

John Petyt (by 1464 – August 1532) was an English politician. He sat as MP for London in 1529.

He also served as warden of the Grocers' Co. from 1519 till 1520 and auditor of London from 1523 till 1525 and 1529 till 1531.

He was the son of Nicholas Petyt. By 1485, he married and in 1521, he married his second wife, Lucy (died 28 November 1558), the daughter of John Wattes and had at least one son and two daughters.
