= Paul Withypoll =

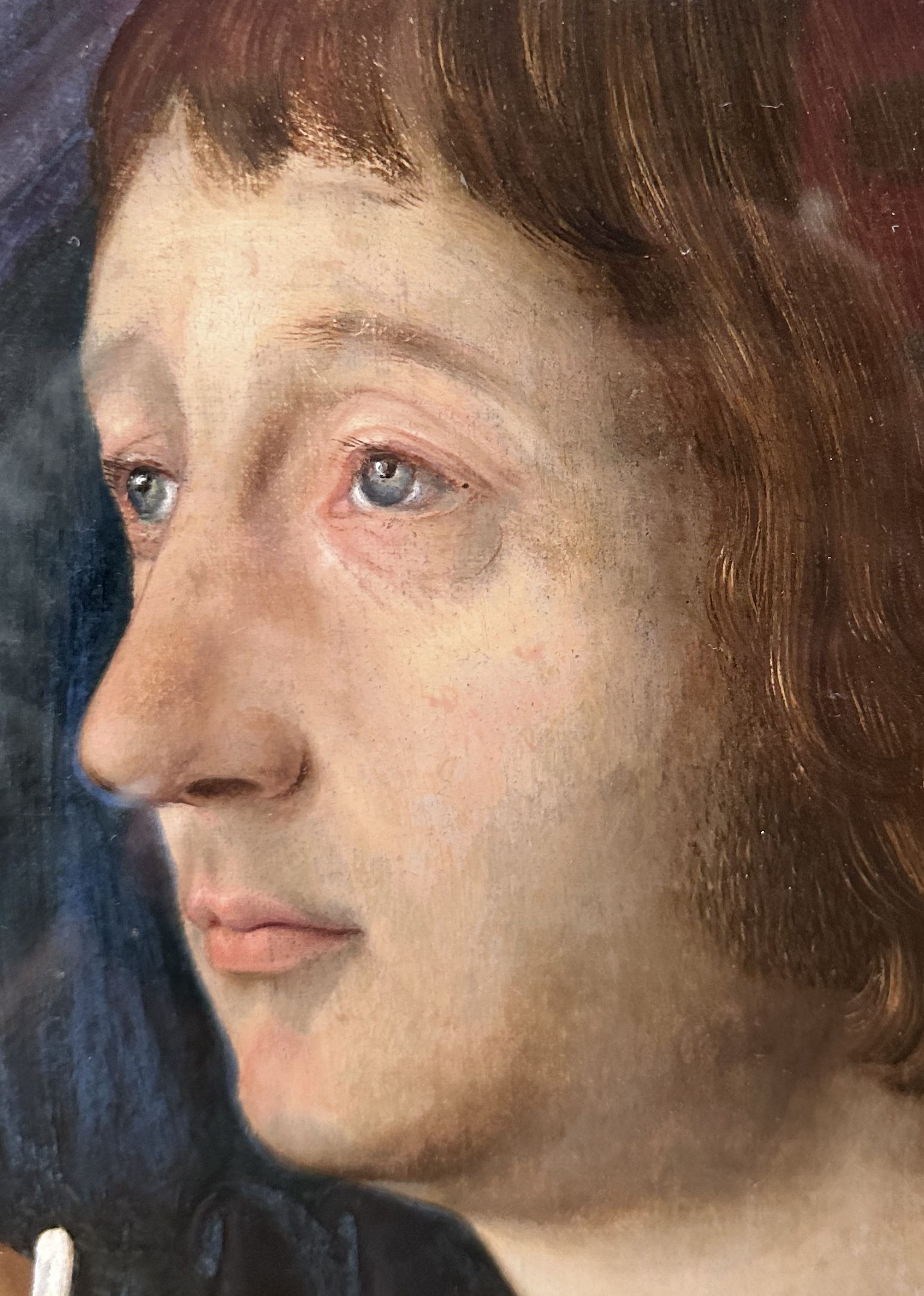
- Born: c.1480-85 Bristol
- Died: 3 June 1547; St. Laurence Poultney in Dowgate, London
- Occupation: Merchant Taylor of London

Paul Withypoll (by 1485 – 3 June 1547, London) was an English merchant, born in Bristol, who settled in London and became a Member of Parliament for the City of London. He had extensive contacts with a group of English merchants and explorers who were engaged in expanding trade networks in the Atlantic world in the early sixteenth century, including Robert Thorne of Bristol, Roger Barlow and Sebastian Cabot.

Centre panel of Withypoll Triptych (1514)

Withypoll's portrait is included in the 'Withypoll Triptych' (1514) he commissioned, painted by the Italian Renaissance artist Antonio Solario, probably while Withypoll was trading in Italy. This is now on display in the Bristol Museum & Art Gallery.

In 1545, with his son, Edmund Withypoll he bought land in Ipswich.
