= Thomas Leggy =

Thomas Leggy (fl. 1343–1357), was an English Member of Parliament (MP).

He was a Member of the Parliament of England for City of London in 1343 and 1357.
