= William Trente =

English politician

William Trente (fl. 1309–1316), was an English Member of Parliament (MP). He was a Member of the Parliament of England for City of London in 1309 and 1316.
