= William de Combemartyn =

William de Combemartyn was an English Member of Parliament (MP).

He was a Member of the Parliament of England for City of London in 1305, 1307, and 1316.
