= Ralph Cholmley =

16th-century English politician

Ralph Cholmley was an English politician.

He was a member (MP) of the Parliament of England for Mitchell in 1547, Bodmin in March 1553 and for Boroughbridge April 1554 and for London in November 1554, 1555, 1558, 1559 and 1563.

Cholmley was Recorder of London. At the coronation of Elizabeth I in 1559, during the royal entry, Cholmley made a speech and presented the city's gift of a purse of gold coins.
