= John Hewster =

English politician

John Hewster (by 1481 – 1525) was an English politician. He sat as MP for London in 1523.

He also served as governor of Merchant Adventurers from 1515 till 1521 and 1523 till his death, common weigher of silk of London from July 1520 till his death, and warden of the Mercers' Co. from 1522 till 1523.

He married his first wife and had two sons. He married his second wife, Jane and had one son.
