= Artie Fewster =

Australian rules footballer

Personal information
- Full name: Arthur Leslie Fewster
- Born: 18 October 1894; Prahran, Victoria
- Died: 13 January 1960 (aged 65); Richmond, Victoria
- Original team: Prahran

Playing career^{1}
Years	Club	Games (Goals)
1919	Richmond	2 (0)
- ^{1} Playing statistics correct to the end of 1919.

Arthur Leslie Fewster (18 October 1894 – 13 January 1960) was an Australian rules footballer who played for the Richmond Football Club in the Victorian Football League (VFL).
