= Robert de Kelesye =

Robert de Kelesye (fl. 1314–1328), was an English Member of Parliament (MP).

He was a Member of the Parliament of England for the City of London in 1312, 1314, 1316, September 1327, April 1328, and October 1328.
