= John de Wengrave =

English Member of Parliament

John de Wengrave (fl. 1312), was an English Member of Parliament (MP).

He was a Member of the Parliament of England for the City of London in 1312.
