= John Gedney (MP for City of London) =

Mayor of London (d. 1449)

John Gedney (died 1449), was an English Member of Parliament (MP).

He was a Member of the Parliament of England for City of London in November 1414 and 1432.
