= John Tate (Lord Mayor of London) =

Member of the Parliament of England

Sir John Tate (died 1515) was twice Lord Mayor of London and a Member of Parliament.

He was born the son of Thomas Tate of Coventry and became a mercer of the City of London, initially apprenticed to his uncle, John Tate, a former (1473) Mayor of London.

John Tate junior was made an Alderman of London in 1463, appointed Sheriff of London for 1485 and elected Lord Mayor for 1496-97 and 1514–15. He was twice elected, in 1504 and 1510, as a Member of Parliament for the City of London. He was knighted in 1497.

He was a generous benefactor to St. Anthony's Hospital, St Benet Fink in the City of London in which connection John Stow in his Survey of London (1598) wrote of him as follows:

"In the year 1499, Sir John Tate, sometime ale-brewer, then a mercer, caused his brewhouse, called the Swan, near adjoining to the said free chapel, college, or hospital of St. Anthonie, to be taken down for the enlarging of the church, which was then new built, toward the building whereof the said Tate gave great sums of money, and finished in the year 1501. Sir John Tate deceased 1514, (sic) and was there buried under a fair monument by him prepared".

He and his wife, Magdalen, had 3 sons, of whom the youngest, Bartholomew, was his heir.

== See also ==
- List of Sheriffs of the City of London
- List of Lord Mayors of London
- City of London (elections to the Parliament of England)
