= Hamo de Chigwell =

English merchant and politician

Hamo de Chigwell (sometimes spelled as Hamond; died 1332) was an English merchant and politician. He served seven terms as Lord Mayor of London, between 1319 and 1327. He was a controversial figure, described by a contemporary alderman as "the vilest worm that had been in the City for more than twenty years", and played a role in the struggle for power between King Edward II and Queen Isabella.

== Early life ==
Chigwell, who also used the name Hamond de Dene, was the son of Thomas Chigwell and his wife Cecilia. His will mentions three men (Richard, Walter, and William) who predeceased him and may have been his brothers. Sources disagree on whether he was a fishmonger by profession or a pepperer member of the Grocers' Company. He became an alderman of Queenhithe ward.

== Mayoralty ==
Chigwell served as London's mayor for a total of seven terms, in 1319, 1321, 1322, 1324, 1325, 1326 (during part of which he was removed in favor of Richard de Betoyne), and 1327. During part of this time, he served as a royal warden, rather than a free mayor, as Edward II had revoked the city's right to choose its own mayor in 1321 (deposing Nicholas de Farndone). During this time, Chigwell was given special authority to arrest suspects and administer the lands of rebels. He was also one of the men chosen to pass judgement on the Mortimers.

Chigwell first came to the mayoralty during a time of political turmoil between the crafts and the aldermen, with Chigwell siding with the former. In his first term the city obtained a new charter, under which city officials would be elected by (and could be removed by) the community, aldermen were barred from serving consecutive terms, and (of particular importance to the crafts) admission to the franchise required strangers to the city to be vouched for by six men of their trade (or the commonalty, if uncommitted).

Always in the background of Chigwell's mayoralty were the factional struggles that marked the reign of Edward II. During the ascendancy of Despenser, Chigwell carefully balanced the need to retain his popularity with the people of London against the need to ingratiate himself to the government. In effect, he declared the city neutral in the struggle between Despenser and the nobles, and kept order in the city with a thousand-strong patrol. This policy had mixed results; Chigwell was removed from office in 1323, but later returned.

=== London Uprising ===
During Chigwell's 1326 term, the city was the scene of constant rioting and factional brawls, and when the invasion force of Queen Isabella and Roger Mortimer landed, Chigwell fled to the Black Friars for his safety. Chigwell, along with other prominent Londoners, was specifically targeted by Mortimer to break the city's leadership.

The rioters found Chigwell, who was "crying for mercy with clasped hands" and forced him to declare his allegiance to Isabella at the Guildhall. Around the middle of November 1326, Isabella sent a letter with Bishop Stratford authorising him to elect a new London mayor. Richard de Betoyne was elected in place of Chigwell.

He was brought to trial, with a jury heavily biased against him. One of the jurors was the alderman John de Cotun, who described Chigwell as "the vilest worm that had been in the City for more than twenty years" and said it would be a blessing for Chigwell's head to be cut off.

Chigwell was condemned to death, but due to his popularity with the citizenry was merely put under arrest at Orsett under the watch of Bishop Gravesend. Amid growing hostility to Mortimer, Chigwell was released by Gravesend and made a triumphant return to London. Though Isabella ordered his arrest, the citizenry helped him evade capture.

== Later life ==
Chigwell lived until either 1328 or 1332, when he died in his bed. He was buried in St. Paul's Cathedral, in the north-west walk against the choir.
