= Thomas Seymour (MP) =

English Member of Parliament

Thomas Seymour (by 1476-1535/36), of London, Saffron Walden, Essex and Hoxton, Middlesex, was an English Member of Parliament (MP).

He was a Member of the Parliament of England for City of London in 1529. He was Lord Mayor of London 1526-7 and Mayor of the Calais Staple 1523.
