= Derek Fewster =

Finnish historian

Derek Fewster (born 1962) is a Swedish-speaking Finnish historian working since 2006 as a researcher at the Department of History at the University of Helsinki. He was a researcher at the Society of Swedish Literature in Finland from 1997 to 2001 and subeditor for the historical journal Historisk Tidskrift för Finland from 1996 to 2000. He has been the chairman of the Swedish Historical Society in Finland since 2003.

Fewster has mainly been concerned with the Finnish national identity and nationalism. His approach treats the construction of early Finnish history in the light of nationalism. He has written a book on the subject, Visions of Past Glory (2006).

He has written many articles about nationalism in internationally edited books, such as On Barbarian Identity, Christianizing Peoples and Converting Individuals and Dig it all.
