= Rachel Fewster =

British environmental statistician

- Born: Rachel Mary Fewster; 9 June 1974 (age 51); Durham, England, United Kingdom
- Awards: Campbell Award of the New Zealand Statistics Association, New Zealand National Teaching Excellence Award
- Scientific career
- Fields: Statistics
- Institutions: University of Auckland

Rachel M. Fewster (born 9 June 1974) is a British and New Zealand environmental statistician and statistical ecologist known for her work on wildlife population size, population genetics, and Benford's law, and for the development of the CatchIT citizen science project for monitoring invasive species. She is a professor of statistics in New Zealand at the University of Auckland.

== Research ==
A common theme of Fewster's research has been the study of invasive species. Her research on New Zealand offshore islands has shown that rats can swim hundreds of metres from one island to another, and therefore that eradicating rats on the islands requires keeping all nearby islands rat-free as well.

== Education and career ==
Fewster read mathematics at the University of Cambridge from 1992 to 1995, and earned a PhD in statistics at the University of St Andrews in 1999. On completing her doctorate, she was offered a position as a postdoctoral researcher at the University of Auckland, and has remained there since then. She has been a full professor since 2019.

== Recognition ==
Fewster won a National Tertiary Teaching Excellence Award in 2009. She is the 2018 winner of the Campbell Award of the New Zealand Statistical Association.
