= Richard Fleming (MP for City of London) =

Richard Fleming or Flemyng (fl. 1459), was an English Member of Parliament (MP).

He was a Member of the Parliament of England for City of London in 1459.
