= William Cantelow =

William Cantelow, was an English Member of Parliament (MP).

He was a Member of the Parliament of England for City of London in 1453 and 1455.

He was a mercer of Cripplegate. And a knight. His daughter Katherine married Sir James Cromer, son of Sir William Cromer. He was a grandfather of George Cromer, Archbishop of Armagh and Primate of All Ireland.
