= John Chaloner (MP for City of London) =

John Chaloner (by 1469–1510/15), was an English Member of Parliament (MP).

He was a Member of the Parliament of England for City of London in 1510.
