= William Tonge (MP) =

14th century English politician

William Tonge (died 1389) was a politician who served in London as an alderman and member of parliament (MP). Tonge served as an MP of the Parliament of England for the City of London in 1377, 1380, and 1388. He served as an alderman for the districts of Vintry (1377–1378), Aldgate (1381–1382), and Tower (1385).

A remaining legacy of Tonge can be found at the All Hallows-by-the-Tower church where he donated one of the first brasses.
