= Richard Marlow (MP) =

Richard Marlow (died 1420/1), of London, was an English Member of Parliament (MP).

He was a Member of the Parliament of England for City of London in 1399, 1411, April 1414 and March 1416.
