= John Blundell (MP) =

John Blundell (by 1511–59), of London and Steeple Barton, Oxfordshire, was an English Member of Parliament (MP).

He was a Member of the Parliament of England for City of London in 1547, March 1553, October 1553 and April 1554.
