= Simon Fraunceys =

Simon Fraunceys (fl. 1336), was an English Member of Parliament (MP).

He was a Member of the Parliament of England for City of London in 1336.
