= John Walcote =

English politician

John Walcote (died between 11 July 1407 and October 1408) was an English politician. He sat as MP for London in February 1388 and 1391.

He served as alderman of Walbrook Ward from March 1388 till 1391, during royal pleasure (no ward given) from 24 July 1392 till before 12 March 1393, Candlewick Street Ward from March 1393 till circa. May 1406. In 1386, he purchased a manor in Northumberland alongside two other London residents.

He also served as common councillor of Candlewick Street Ward in March 1382 till 1383, October 1384, 1387 till 1388, auditor of London from 21 September 1382 till 1383, 1388 till 1389, 1397 till 1398 and 1399 till 1400, Mayor of London from 13 October 1402 till 1403, tax collector of London in December 1385 and December 1401, Sheriff of London and Middlesex from Michaelmas 1389 till 1390, and commissioner to recruit soldiers and sailors to protect English shipping in London in August 1403. He also served as the Lord Mayor of the Drapers' Company in 1402.

He was the son of a draper called John Walcote. Before 1393, he married a woman called Christine and had one daughter.
