= Stephen Browne =

Stephen Browne (1395 – 1462–4) was a grocer, alderman of London, a Member of Parliament for London and Mayor of London.

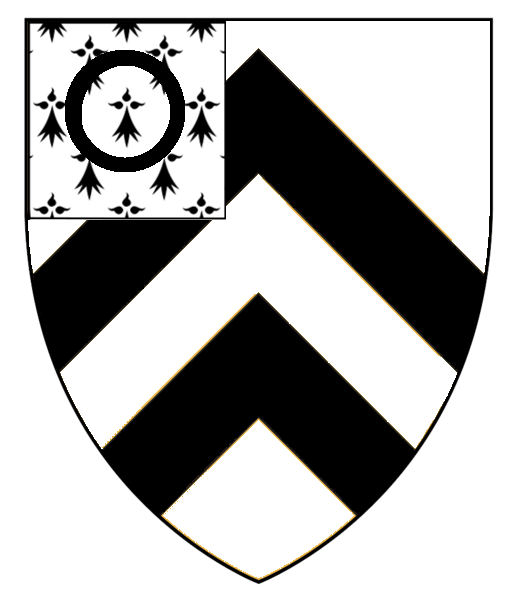
Armorial bearings of Stephen Browne Mayor of London 1438 & 1448

== Career ==
Browne is recorded a warden of the Grocers' company from 1425 to 1426 in London. He later held the office of master of the company on five occasions from 1432 during his lifetime.

Browne was an elected alderman of London for 31 years between 1429 and 1460; (Note: Browne was first Alderman of Aldgate Ward until 1445 when he moved over to Billingsgate Ward, holding that position until he was exonerated on February 14, 1460.) he was sheriff of London from 1431 to 1432, and Mayor of London from 1438 to 1439, and again ten years later from 1448 to 1449. In these capacities Browne sat on trials and convictions of immorality. Browne also sat on London commissions from 1447 to 1452, and elector in 1449 (twice), 1450 and 1455.

Browne was owner of land and rents in London and elsewhere worth £65 per annum. Also, King Henry V (died 1422) at one time owed Browne £400. Browne was a large corn-factor and interested in the cloth trade. In 1439 as grocer of London he had license to buy wheat in Yorkshire to ship to London. In 1448 his goods in possession of Sir Robert Wingfield at Letheringham, Suffolk were destroyed after the Duke of Norfolk lay waste to the village. Browne as Member of parliament represented London in the Parliaments of 1449 and 1453.

== Family ==
Browne (also spelt Broun) hailed from Newcastle-on-Tyne, and is said to have been the son of John Brown. He had a brother Robert Browne, whose son was Sir Thomas Browne. Browne had one son – John Browne – but was thrice married to Julia, Alice and Rose (Note: Roskell et alia state that Rose was the daughter and coheiress of Robert Scott (d.1441), of Abbotsley, Huntingdon), who all predeceased him. Browne died between 1462 and 1464 as his will was dated 28 April 1462, and presented at the London husting 5 February 1465. Browne retained links to Newcastle-on-Tyne making bequests for the upkeep of St. Nicholas in his will. He also had property at Lynn, and a house in Thames street, London. which was called Browne's place and adjoining wharf called Browne's Quay.

Agnes, the widow of John Browne, married Peter (Piers) Peckham, lawyer of London, and esquire of Denham, Buckinghamshire.
