= Nicholas de Farndone =

English goldsmith and politician

Nicholas de Farndone (sometimes written as Farindon, Farindone or Farrington) (died 1334) was a fourteenth-century English goldsmith and politician who served four non-consecutive terms as Mayor of London.

He was born Nicholas le Fevre, son of Ralph le Fevre, but assumed the surname of Farndone after marrying Isabella, daughter and heiress of William de Farndone (died 1293-94), a London goldsmith and alderman.

Like William, Nicholas was a goldsmith. In 1293 he succeeded his father-in-law as alderman of the ward of Farringdon Within, and was elected mayor in 1308, 1313, 1320, and 1323. During his second term, on behalf of King Edward II, Nicholas issued a ban of the game of football, ancestor to the modern games of soccer and rugby, ostensibly due to the noise and disturbance ("great evils") caused by the game. He was elected Member of Parliament for the City of London, as one of the two aldermanic representatives, in 1312, 1313, 1320, and 1321.

Nicholas died in 1334, without male issue, and devised his aldermanry to Sir John de Pulteney, then mayor of London.

Roysia, the daughter of Nicholas and Isabella, made two marriages. The first was to Robert Convers, by whom she had issue Nicholas (de Farndon, died 1361) and Katherine. The second was to David de Cotesbrok by whom she had Thomas (de Farndon).

A chantry was established in 1361 at St Peter, Westcheap for Nicholas de Farndon and his daughter Roysia, by the will of his grandson Nicholas.

== See also ==
- List of Lord Mayors of London
- City of London (elections to the Parliament of England)
