= William de Leyre =

Member of English Parliament

William Mars de Leyre (fl. 1291), was an English Member of Parliament (MP).

He was a Member of the Parliament of England for City of London in June 1298.
