= Stephen de Abyndon =

English Member of Parliament

Stephen de Abyndon (fl. 1312–1321), was an English Member of Parliament (MP).

He was a Member of the Parliament of England for City of London in 1312 and 1321.
