= John Kyme (MP for City of London) =

English politician

John Kyme (by 1469 – 1527 or 1528), of London, was an English politician.

He was a member (MP) of the parliament of England for London in 1512 and 1515.
