= Guild of Pepperers =

The Guild of Pepperers was a London Guild dating from 1180. In 1345 it merged with the Spicers into the Fraternity of St. Anthony, which eventually became the Worshipful Company of Grocers.

The Ancient Guild of Pepperers chose a camel as its symbol as pepper originally came over land rather than sea. The camel continues as a symbol of the Grocers.

Black pepper is one of the world's most popular spices and has been for centuries. Peppercorns have at times been considered portable wealth.

== Sources ==
- Hazlitt, William Carew (1892). "The Great Companies: The Grocers". The Livery Companies of the City of London: Their origin, character, development, and social and political importance (PDF). Swan Sonnenschein & Co. pp. 187–197.
- Bellamy, Jean (September 2006). "The Worshipful Company of Grocers". TimeTravel-Britain.
