= William Askham =

Fourteenth century Lord Mayor of London

William Askham was Lord Mayor of London in 1403–1404.

== Career ==
Askham was an apprentice of the famous City of London fishmonger and Lord Mayor Sir William Walworth. He prospered in his trade and eventually followed in his master's footsteps as Sheriff of London in 1398 and Lord Mayor in 1403.

== Coat of arms ==
Askham's arms were blazoned: Gules, a fesse or between three dolphins embowed argent. This design clearly reflected the arms of the ancient Guild of Fishmongers, similar to those of the present Worshipful Company of Fishmongers (see that article).

== See also ==
- List of Lord Mayors of London
- List of Sheriffs of London

== Sources ==
- William Askham at Heraldsnet.org
- Fishmongers' Hall and Fish Street Hill
