= Robert Chichele =

English merchant and Lord Mayor of London

Sir Robert Chichele (sometimes shown as Chichley or other variations) was a 15th-century English merchant and Lord Mayor of London.

He was the son of Thomas Chichele of Higham Ferrers and Agnes Pyncheon, and the brother of Henry Chichele, the Archbishop of Canterbury and founder of All Souls, Oxford. Another brother, William, also served as Sheriff of London in 1409.

Robert served as an Alderman for Aldgate Ward from 1402, when he also served as Sheriff of London before being elected twice as Lord Mayor of London, in 1411 and again in 1421. He received letters patent ordering him (along with then-mayor Richard Whittington) to seek out and imprison any Lollards within the city. In 1414 and 1415 he was Member of Parliament for the City of London as one of the two aldermanic representatives.

Robert was buried in the church of St Mary Bothaw. Through his daughter, Phillippa, he was an ancestor of Sir Andrew Judde, a later Lord Mayor of London.

== See also ==
- List of Sheriffs of the City of London
- List of Lord Mayors of London
- City of London (elections to the Parliament of England)

== Sources ==
- Burke, John; Burke, Bernard (1842). General Armory of England, Scotland, and Ireland.
- Cox, John Edmund (1876). The Annals of St. Helen's, Bishopsgate, London.
- Newcourt, Richard (1708). Repetorium Ecclesiasticum Parochiale Londinense. Vol. 1. London.
- Riddy, Felicity (2000). Prestige, Authority, and Power in Late Medieval Manuscripts and Texts.
- "Lord Mayors of the City of London from 1189" (PDF). citybridgetrust.gov.uk. Archived from the original (PDF) on 14 July 2014.<
- "Chronological list of aldermen: 1302-1400" – via British History Online.
