= Truscott (surname) =

Truscott is a surname, and may refer to:

- Adrienne Truscott, American stand-up comedian
- Alan Truscott (1925–2005), British bridge player and writer
- Andries Truscott (born 1968), South African rugby union footballer
- Carl Truscott, American Secret Service agent and official
- Denis Truscott (1908–1989), British businessman and Lord Mayor of London
- Dorothy Hayden Truscott (1925–2006), American bridge player, wife of Alan Truscott
- Francis Wyatt Truscott (1824–1895), English businessman and Lord Mayor of London
- Frank Truscott (1894–1969), American attorney
- George Wyatt Truscott (1857–1941), British businessman and Lord Mayor of London, son of Francis Wyatt Truscott
- Harold Truscott (1914–1992), British composer and pianist
- Jacob Truscott (born 2002), American ice hockey player
- Jim Truscott (1956–2021), Australian businessman
- John Truscott (1936–1993), Australian production designer
- Keith Truscott (1916–1943), Australian rules footballer and flying ace
- Louis Truscott (born 1978), American basketball player
- Lucian Truscott (1895–1965), United States Army general
- Lucian K. Truscott IV (born 1947), American journalist, grandson of Lucian Truscott
- Mark Truscott (born 1970), Canadian poet
- Meta Truscott (1917–2014), Australian diarist
- Neil Truscott (1923–2011), Australian public servant and diplomat
- Paul Truscott (born 1986), British boxer
- Peter Truscott (1941–2025), New Zealand cricketer
- Peter Truscott, Baron Truscott (born 1959), British consultant, politician and life peer
- Steven Truscott (born 1945), Canadian man wrongly convicted of murder
- Tadd Truscott, American engineer and academic
- Tom Truscott (born 1956), American computer scientist
- William "Nipper" Truscott (1886–1966), Australian sportsman

== See also ==
- Truscott baronets
- Mary Luella Trescott (1861–1935), American lawyer
- William Henry Trescot (1822–1898), American politician
