= Truscott =

Truscott may refer to:

== People ==
- Truscott (surname)

== Fictional characters ==
- Inspector Truscott in the Joe Orton play Loot
- Lilly Truscott in the TV series Hannah Montana
- Major Harry Kitchener Wellington Truscott in the TV series Fairly Secret Army

== Places ==
- Truscott, Cornwall, England, a hamlet
- Truscott, Texas, United States, an unincorporated community
- Mungalalu Truscott Airbase, Western Australia, known as Truscott Airfield during World War II
- Truscott baronets, a title in the Baronetage of the United Kingdom
