= Thomas Owden =

Lord mayor of London (1808–1899)

The Right Honourable Sir Thomas Scambler Owden
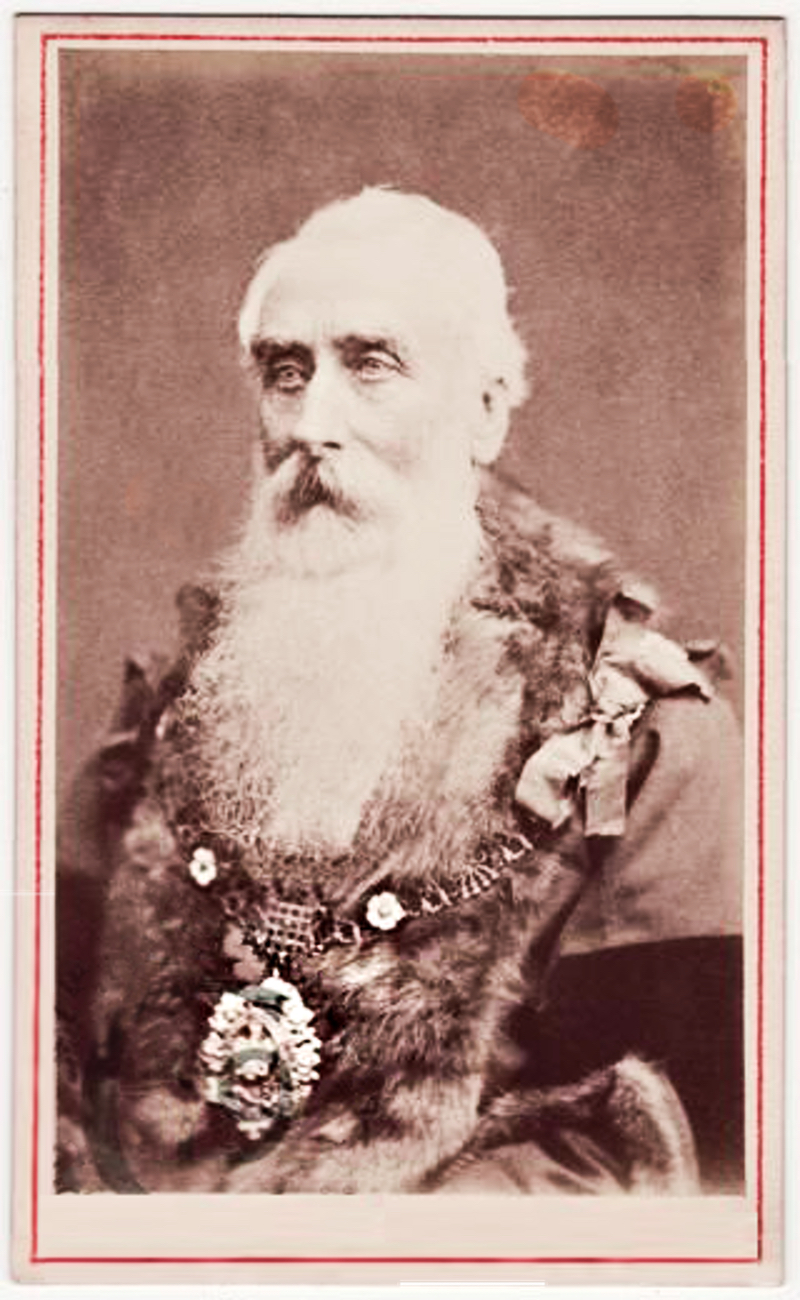

Lord Mayor of London
- In office 9 November 1877 – 9 November 1878
- Preceded by: Thomas White
- Succeeded by: Charles Whetham

Sheriff of the City of London
- In office 28 September 1870 – 28 September 1871
- Preceded by: John Bennett; Francis Wyatt Truscott
- Succeeded by: Charles Whetham; John Henry Johnson

Alderman of the City of London
- In office 1868–1889
- Preceded by: William Taylor Copeland
- Succeeded by: Horatio Davies

Personal details
- Born: October 28, 1808 Cuckfield, West Sussex, United Kingdom of Great Britain and Ireland
- Died: January 9, 1899 (aged 90) Sutton, London, United Kingdom of Great Britain and Ireland
- Resting place: Highgate Cemetery, England
- Profession: Businessman

Sir Thomas Scambler Owden (28 October, 1808 – 9 January, 1899) was a British businessman and civic official who served as the Lord Mayor of London from 1877 to 1878. He also served as the Sheriff of London from 1870 to 1871 and as an Alderman for Bishopsgate and served as the Master of the Worshipful Company of Innholders and the Worshipful Company of Carmen.

== Early years ==
Thomas Scambler Owden was born on October 28, 1808, in Cuckfield, Sussex, England, He is the son of John Bennet Owden, and his wife, Ann Scambler, which came from a London family and was a lineal descendant of Edmund Scambler. His father passed away in London in May 1811, before he reached his third birthday. His mother sold the Cuckfield business and relocated the family to London. He was baptized on 30 September 1810 at St George in Stepney.

== Career ==
Owden started his career in London as a livery stable keeper. He entered the trade in partnership with his uncle, Henry Scambler. He operated a successful stabling and horse harnessing firm at 62 Bishopsgate Street. Following his uncle's death in May 1845, he inherited the trading business.

Owden received the Freedom of the City of London via the Honorable Company of Innholders in December 1835, eventually serving as the guild's Master from 1853 to 1854. He also joined the Livery Company, serving as its Master in 1882. He also served as a member of the Worshipful Company of Loriners.

Owden assumed office as the Lord Mayor of London on 9 November 1877. His term was defined by his outspoken support for Prime Minister Benjamin Disraeli policy during the Russo-Turkish War. In recognition of his municipal service and leadership, he was knighted by Queen Victoria at Windsor Castle in 1878.

== Personal life ==
In 1837, Owden married Frances Mary Rigby at St. Botolph without Bishopsgate. By 1851, the couple had at least seven children, including three sons and four daughters.

Owden died at his home on January 9, 1889, at the age of 80. He was buried on January 14, 1889, in the Owden family grave at Highgate Cemetery in North London.

Civic offices
Preceded by John Bennett; Francis Wyatt Truscott	Sheriff of London; 1870–1871	Succeeded by Charles Whetham; John Henry Johnson
Preceded by Thomas White	Lord Mayor of London; 1877–1878	Succeeded by Charles Whetham
Preceded by William Taylor Copeland	Alderman for the City of London; 1868–1889	Succeeded by Horatio Davies
