= George Wyatt Truscott =

British businessman and Lord Mayor of London (1857–1941)

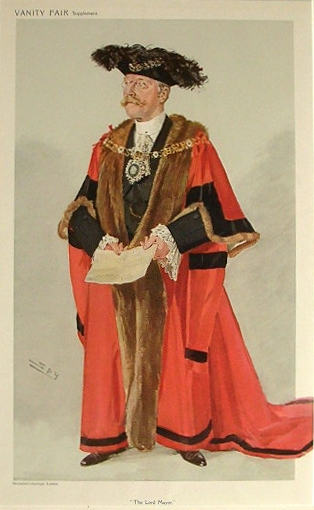
Vanity Fair caricature, 1908

Sir George Wyatt Truscott, 1st Baronet (9 October 1857 – 16 April 1941) was a British businessman and Lord Mayor of London from 1908 to 1909.

== Background ==
Truscott was born in 1857, the eldest surviving son of Alderman Sir Francis Wyatt Truscott and Eliza Freeman, daughter of James Freeman. His father was Lord Mayor of London 1879–80, and a sister Louisa Truscott (d. 1933) was the wife of Sir Homewood Crawford, for many years Solicitor to the Corporation of the City of London.

He was educated at private schools, and stayed for a while in Paris. He was Chairman of Brown, Knight & Truscott, Ltd, printers and stationers; the company was merged in 2023 into BLP (Northern) Ltd. He was a resident of the London suburb of Upper Norwood where his parents had also lived for many years.

== Civic career ==
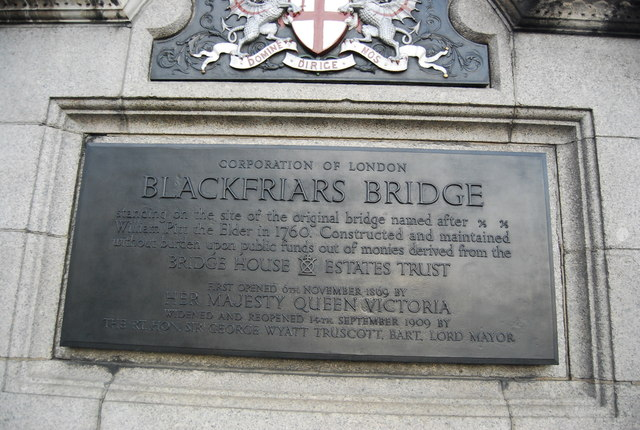
Memorial plaque to Truscott on Blackfriars Bridge, London.

Truscott had a long career in the City of London. He was a Common Councilman, City of London, 1882–1895, then elected Alderman of the Dowgate Ward, in succession to his late father, in 1895.

He was elected a Sheriff of the City of London in 1902 (serving October 1902 to September 1903), together with Thomas Henry Brooke-Hitching. During his year as Sheriff, he accompanied the Lord Mayor (Sir Marcus Samuel) on an official visit to the English city Newcastle upon Tyne (November 1902), where they made a journey down the River Tyne, and visited the Elswick works. Five years later, he was elected Lord Mayor of the City of London in 1908 (serving November 1908 to November 1909). He was on the Commission for the Lieutenancy for City of London; a Chairman of Visiting Committee of the City of London Mental Hospital; Governor of St Bartholomew's, St Thomas's, Christ's and Bethlehem Hospitals; and of Queen Ann's Bounty. Truscott received the Honorary Freedom of the City of London in 1937.

During his mayoralty, Truscott opened the widened Blackfriars Bridge and drove the first tram across it, on 14 September 1909.

Truscott was made a Knight Bachelor while he was sheriff, in the November 1902 Birthday Honours list, and knighted by King Edward VII at Buckingham Palace on 18 December 1902. For his service as Lord Mayor he was customary created a Baronet, of Oakleigh in East Grinstead in the County of Sussex, on 16 July 1909.

He received several foreign awards during his years in the City, including Officer of the Order of the Legion of Honour of France, Officer of the Order of Leopold of Belgium, Knight Commander of the Order of Wasa of Sweden, Knight Commander of the Order of the Rising Sun of Japan, and Grand Cross of the Russian Order of St Stanislaus.

== Family ==
Truscott married Jessie Stanham (d 1921), elder daughter of George Gordon Stanham, an architect. She was a Lady of Grace of the Order of St John of Jerusalem. They had two sons and two daughters. One of their sons were killed in the war, the other was Eric Homewood Stanham Truscott who succeeded him as baronet in 1941.

Coat of arms of George Wyatt Truscott
Crest A fasces erect surmounted by a palm branch slipped and an arrow saltirewise all Proper. Escutcheon Argent three chevronels Gules between two mullets in chief of the last pierced of the field and a knight’s helmet in base Proper a chief check of the second and first. Motto Gwir Yn Erbyn Y Byd (Truth Against All The World); In Utrumque Paratus

Civic offices
Preceded by Sir John Bell	580th Lord Mayor of London; 1908–1909	Succeeded by Sir John Knill, 2nd Baronet
Baronetage of the United Kingdom
New creation	Baronet (of Oakleigh in East Grinstead in the County of Sussex); 1909–1941	Succeeded by Eric Homewood Stanham Truscott
