= Temple Bar, London =

Monument in London, England

Coordinates: 51°30′49″N 0°06′43″W

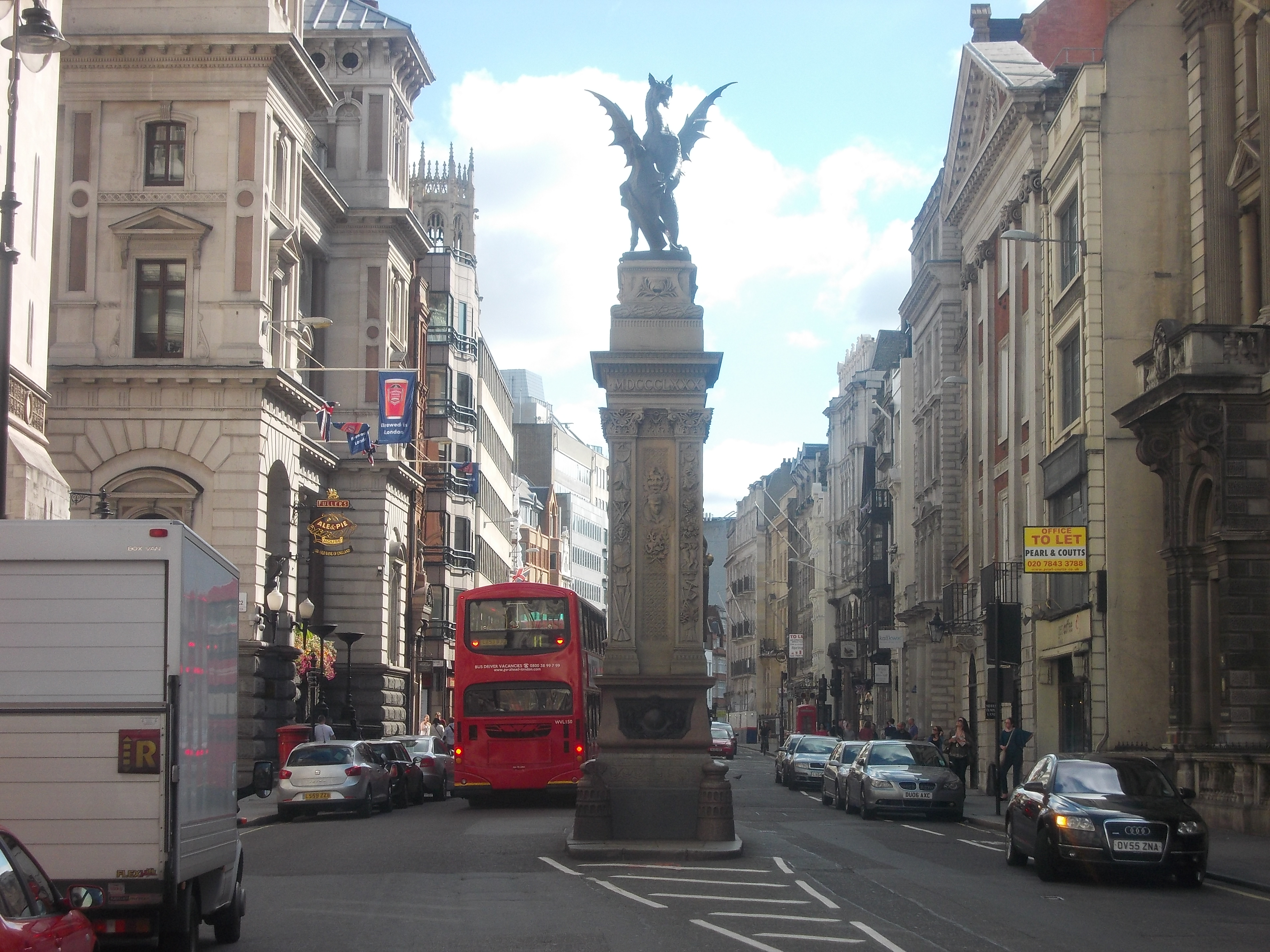
Temple Bar in 2012, with the Temple Bar Memorial in the centre

Temple Bar was the principal ceremonial entrance to the City of London from the City of Westminster. In the Middle Ages, London expanded city jurisdiction beyond its walls to gates, called 'bars', which were erected across thoroughfares. To the west of the City of London, the bar was located adjacent to the area known as the Temple. Temple Bar was situated on the historic royal ceremonial route from the Palace of the Tower of London to the old Palace of Westminster, the two chief residences of the medieval English monarchs, and from Westminster to St Paul's Cathedral. The road east of the bar within the city was Fleet Street, while the road to the west, in Westminster, was The Strand.

At the bar, the Corporation of the City of London erected a barrier to regulate trade into the city. The 19th century Royal Courts of Justice are located to its north, having been moved from Westminster Hall. To its south is Temple Church, along with the Inner Temple and Middle Temple Inns of Court. As the most important entrance to the City of London from Westminster, it was formerly long the custom for the monarch to halt at the Temple Bar before entering the City of London, in order for the Lord Mayor to offer the corporation's pearl-encrusted Sword of State as a token of loyalty.

'Temple Bar' strictly refers to a notional bar or barrier across the route near The Temple precinct, but it is also used to refer to the 17th-century ornamental, English Baroque arched gateway building attributed to Christopher Wren, which spanned the roadway at the bar for two centuries. After Wren's gateway was removed in 1878, the Temple Bar Memorial topped by a dragon symbol of London, and containing statues of Queen Victoria and Edward VII, was erected to mark the location. Wren's archway was preserved and was re-erected in 2004 within the City of London, in a redeveloped Paternoster Square next to St Paul's Cathedral. In September 2022, the preserved Wren gateway and an adjacent building were officially opened by the Duke of Gloucester as the home of the Worshipful Company of Chartered Architects.

== Background ==
In the Middle Ages, the authority of the City of London Corporation reached beyond the city's ancient defensive walls in several places, known as the Liberties of London. To regulate trade into the city, barriers were erected on the major entrance routes wherever the true boundary was a substantial distance from the nearest ancient gatehouse in the walls. Temple Bar was the most used of these, since traffic between the City of London (England's prime commercial centre) and the Palace of Westminster (the political centre) passed through it. It was located where Fleet Street now meets The Strand, which is outside London's old boundary wall.

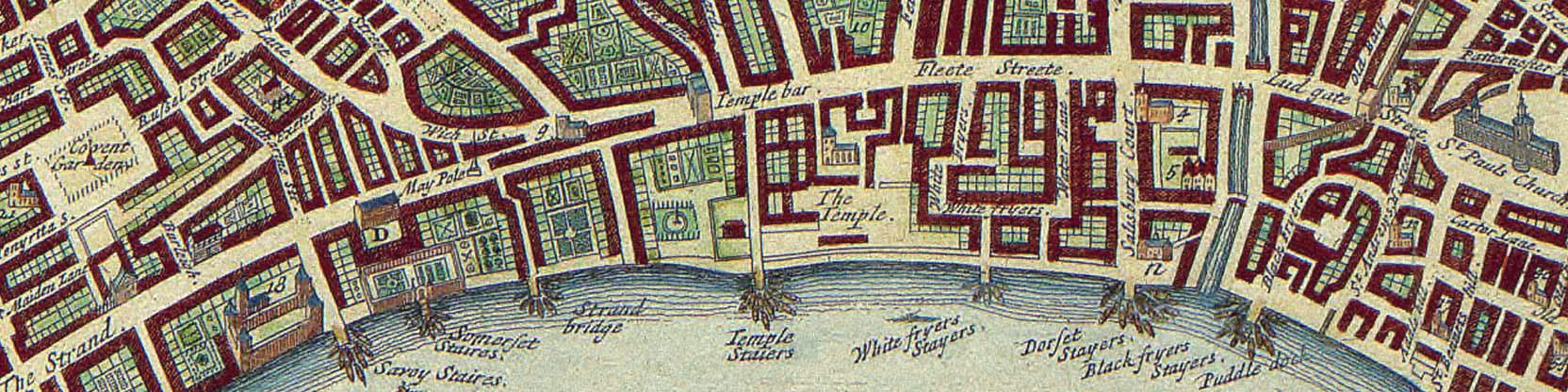
Temple Bar (upper centre) between The Strand and Fleet Street on a 17th-century map

Its name derives from the Temple Church, adjoining to the south, which has given its name to a wider area south of Fleet Street, the Temple, once belonging to the Knights Templar but now home to two of the legal profession's Inns of Court, and within the city's ancient boundaries.

The historic ceremony of the monarch halting at Temple Bar and being met by the Lord Mayor has often featured in art and literature. It is commented on in televised coverage of modern-day royal ceremonial processions.

== History ==
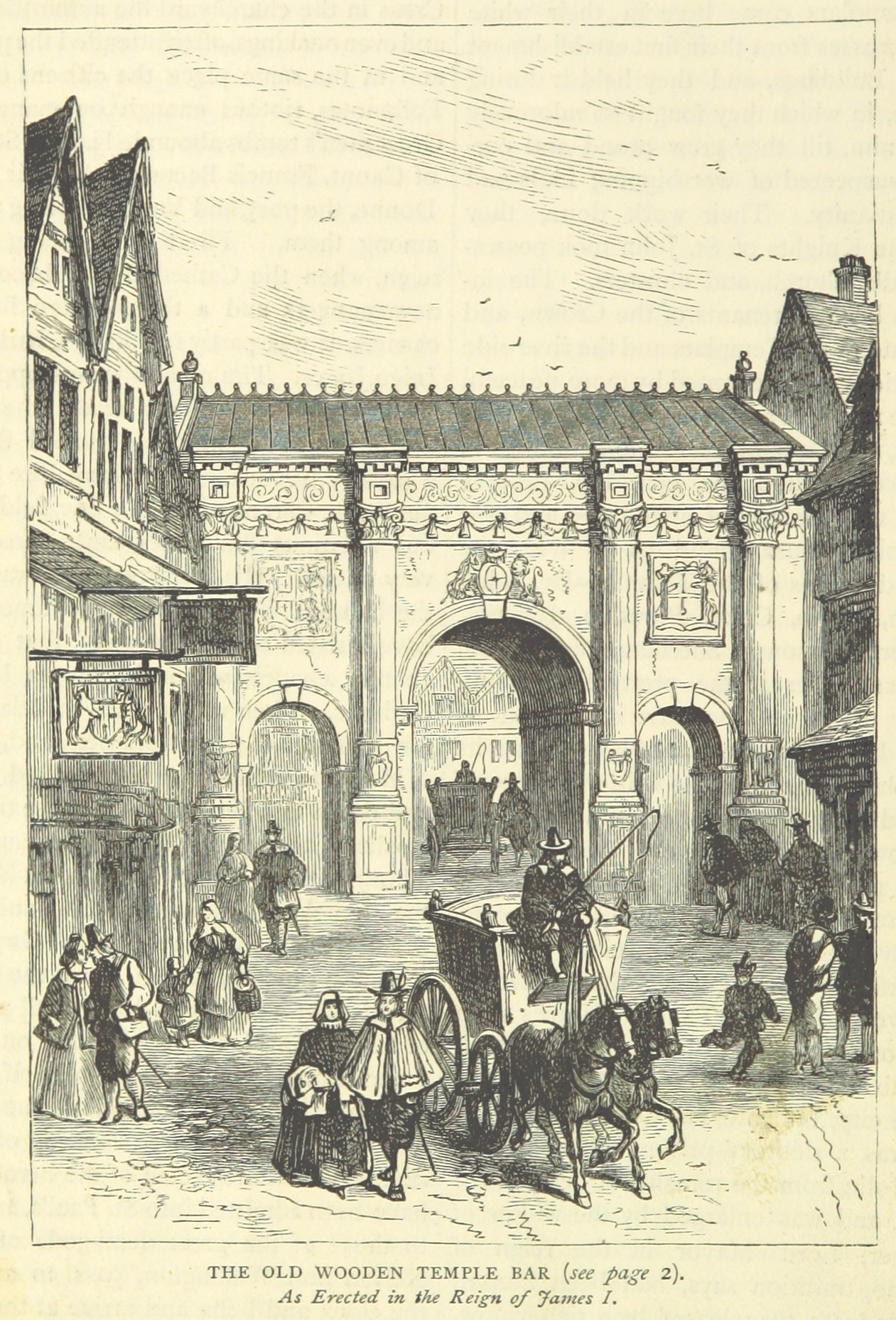
The Old Wooden Temple Bar before the Great Fire of 1666

=== City jurisdiction and The Temple ===
A City bar at The Temple is first mentioned in 1293 and was probably only a chain or bar between a row of posts. More substantial structures with arches followed. After the Battle of Evesham of 1265, Prince Edward punished the rebellious Londoners, who had befriended Simon de Montfort, by taking away all their street chains and bars, and storing them in the Tower of London. By 1351, a timber archway had been built housing a small prison above it. The earliest known documentary and historical notice of Temple Bar is in 1327, concerning a hearing before the mayor regarding a right of way in the area. In 1384, Richard II granted a licence for paving the Strand Street from Temple Bar to the Savoy, and collecting tolls to cover the expense.

On 5 November 1422, the corpse of Henry V was borne to Westminster Abbey by the chief citizens and nobles, and every doorway from Southwark to Temple Bar had a torch-bearer. In 1503 the hearse of Elizabeth of York, queen of Henry VII, halted at Temple Bar, on its way from the Tower to Westminster, and at the Bar the Abbots of Westminster and Bermondsey blessed the corpse, and the Earl of Derby and a large company of nobles joined the funeral procession. Anne Boleyn passed through the Bar on 31 May 1534, the day before her coronation, on her way to the Tower. On that occasion Temple Bar was new painted and repaired, and near it stood singing men and children—the Fleet Street conduit all the time running claret.

In 1554, Thomas Wyatt led an uprising in opposition to Queen Mary I's proposed marriage to Philip II of Spain. When he had fought his way down Piccadilly to The Strand, Temple Bar was thrown open to him, or forced open by him; but when he had been repulsed at Ludgate he was hemmed in by cavalry at Temple Bar, where he surrendered. This revolt persuaded the government to go through with the execution of Lady Jane Grey.

The notable Scottish bookseller Andrew Millar owned his first London shop at Temple Bar, taken over from the ownership of James McEuen in 1728, to whom Millar had been apprenticed.

=== Wren's Temple Bar Gate ===
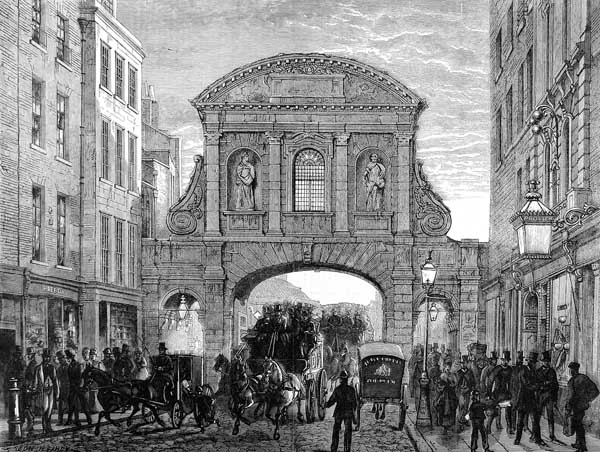
Temple Bar Gate in 1870, when it was still located to mark the Temple Bar

Although the then existing Bar Gate at the Temple escaped damage by the Great Fire of London of 1666, it was decided to rebuild it as part of the general improvement works made throughout the city after that devastating event. Commissioned by King Charles II, and attributed to Sir Christopher Wren, the fine arch of Portland stone was constructed between 1669 and 1672, by Thomas Knight, the City Mason, and Joshua Marshall, Master of the Mason's Company and King's Master Mason, while John Bushnell carved the statues.

Rusticated, it is a two-story structure consisting of one wide central arch for the road traffic, flanked on both sides by narrower arches for pedestrians. On the upper part, four statues celebrate the 1660 Restoration of the Stuart monarchy: in its original setting, on the west side King Charles II is shown with his father King Charles I whose parents King James I and Anne of Denmark are depicted on the east side. During the 18th century the heads of convicted traitors were frequently mounted on pikes and exhibited on the roof, as was the case on London Bridge. The other seven principal gateways to London, (Ludgate, Newgate, Aldersgate, Cripplegate, Moorgate, Bishopsgate and Aldgate) were all demolished in the 1760s, but Temple Bar remained despite its impediment to the ever-growing traffic. The upper-storey room was leased to the neighbouring banking house of Child & Co for storage of records.

In the 1853 novel, Bleak House, Charles Dickens described it as "that leaden-headed old obstruction, appropriate ornament for the threshold of a leaden-headed old corporation" (the City of London corporation). It was also the subject of jokes, "Why is Temple Bar like a lady's veil? Both must be raised (razed) for "busses" ('buses). It was noted in jest "as a weak spot in our defences", since one could walk through the adjoining barbershop where one door opened on to the city and the other in the area of Westminster.

In 1874 it was discovered that the keystones had dropped and the arches were propped up with timbers. The steady increase in horse and cart traffic led to complaints that Temple Bar was becoming a bottleneck, holding back the City trade. In 1878 the City of London Corporation, eager to widen the road but unwilling to destroy so historic a monument, dismantled it piece-by-piece over an 11-day period and stored its 2,700 stones carefully. In 1880 the brewer Henry Meux, at the instigation of his wife Valerie Susan Meux, bought the stones and re-erected the arch as the facade of a new gatehouse in the park of his mansion house Theobalds Park in Hertfordshire, the site of a former substantial prodigy house of James VI and I. There it remained, positioned in a woodland clearing, until 2003. A plaque now marks the Hertfordshire site.

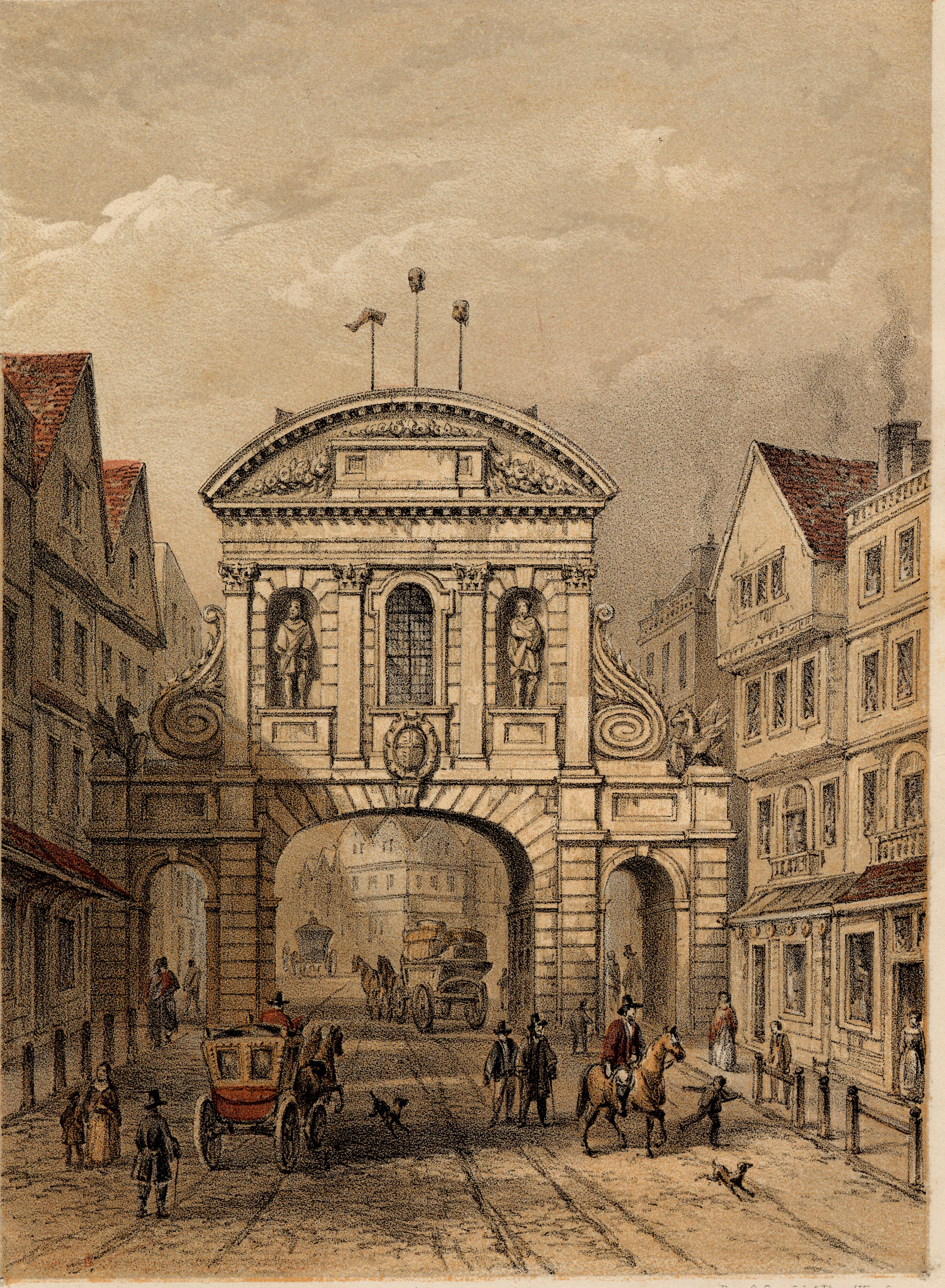
Artist's conception of the Temple Bar Gate at the commencement of the 18th century. Note heads on pikes above the gate.

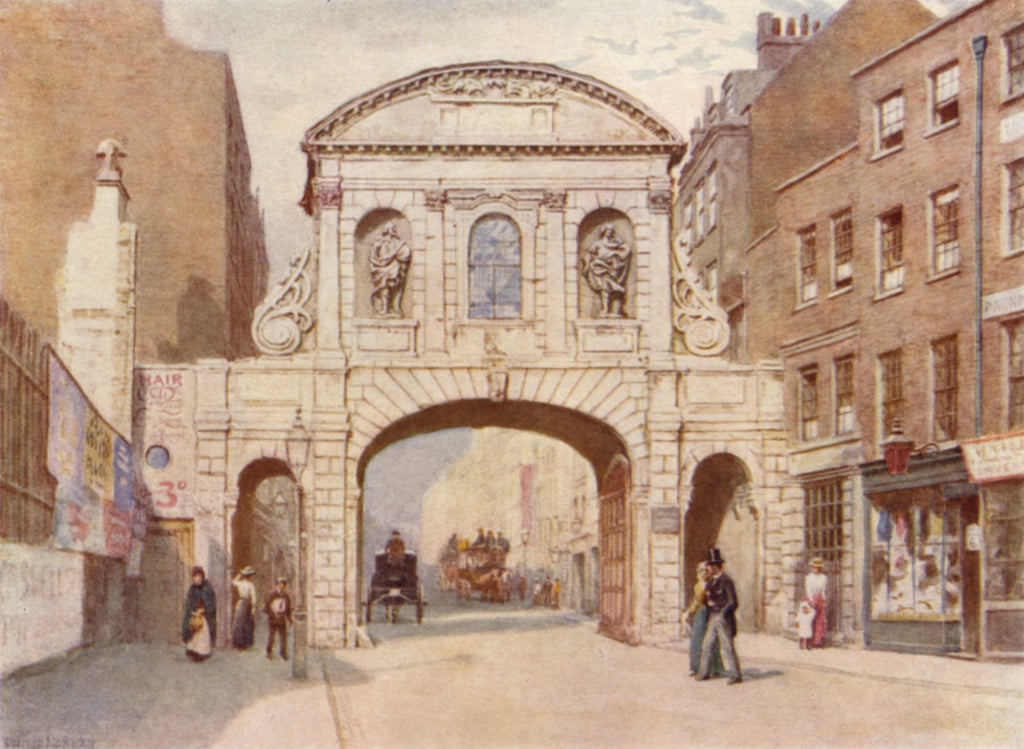
Temple Bar by Philip Norman, 1876

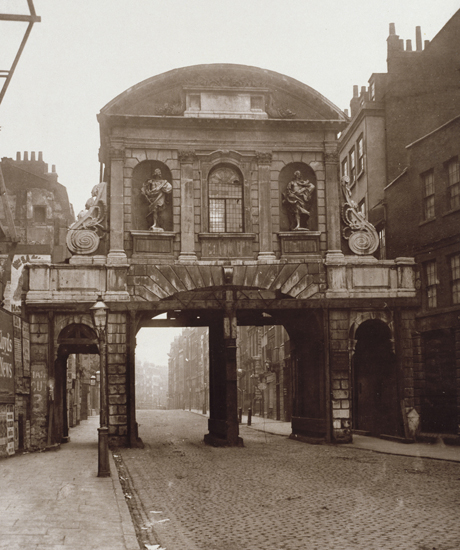
Temple Bar Gate required timber support props in the 1870s and was dismantled in 1878.

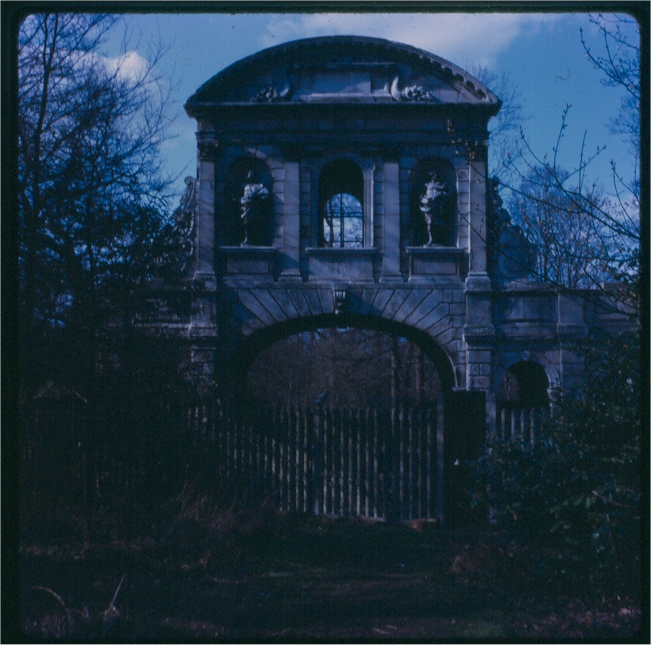
Temple Bar Gate was re-erected at Theobalds Park in Hertfordshire in the late 19th century. Pictured here in 1968, it stood there until being moved back to London.

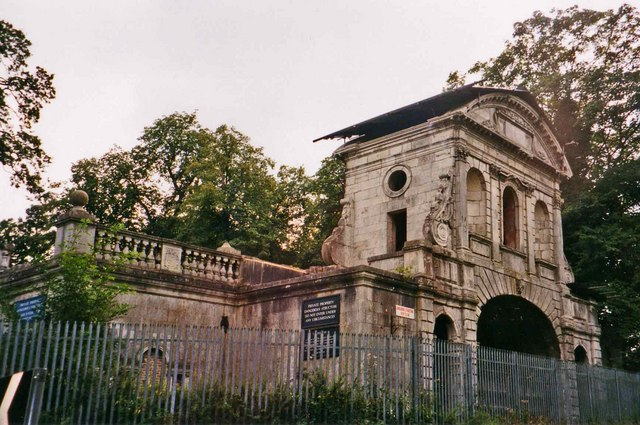
Temple Bar Gate at Theobalds Park, 1999

=== The Gate's present location ===
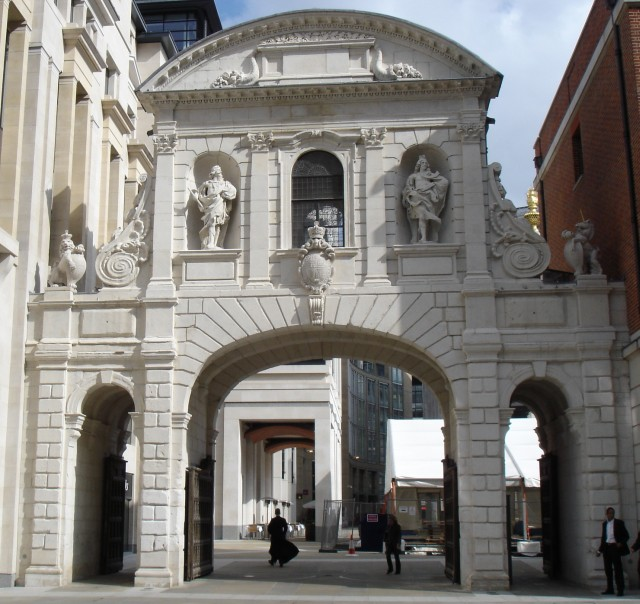
Temple Bar Gate after reconstruction in Paternoster Square, 2005

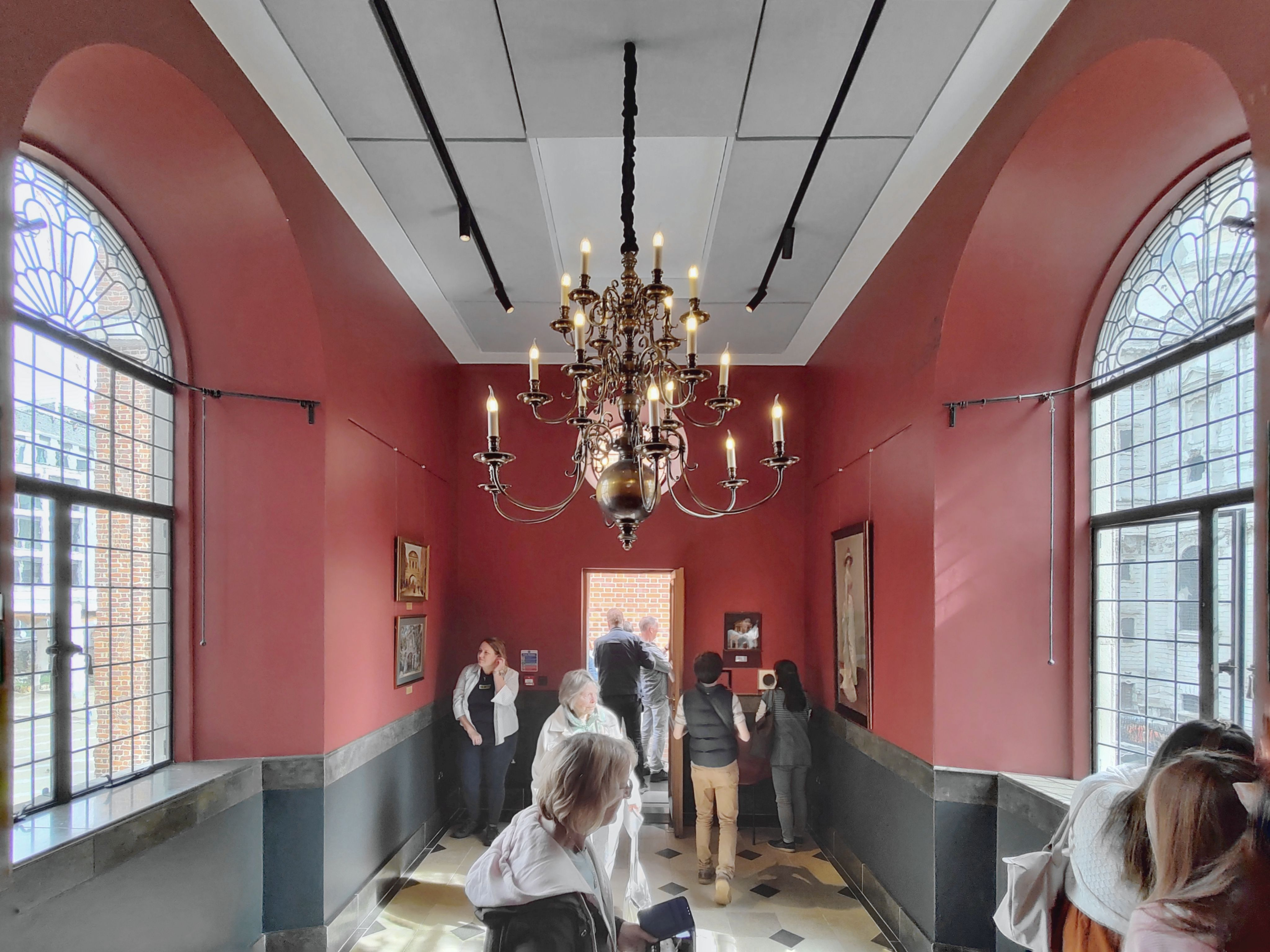
Upper room interior in 2024

In March 1938 Theobalds Park was sold by Sir Hedworth Meux to Middlesex County Council, but Wren's Temple Bar Gatehouse was excluded from the sale and retained by the Meux trustees in the park. In 1984 it was bought by the Temple Bar Trust from the Meux Trust for the sum of £1. In December 2001 the city's Court of Common Council resolved to contribute funds for the return of Temple Bar Gate to the city. On 13 October 2003 the first stone was dismantled at Theobalds Park and all were placed on 500 pallets for storage. In 2004 it was returned to the City of London where it was painstakingly re-erected as an entrance to the Paternoster Square redevelopment immediately north of St Paul's Cathedral, opening to the public on 10 November 2004. The total cost of the project was over £3 million, funded mainly by the City of London, with donations from the Temple Bar Trust and several City Livery Companies.

In September 2022, Temple Bar London, consisting of the gateway and an adjacent building (Paternoster Lodge), was officially reopened by the Duke of Gloucester and the Lord Mayor of London Vincent Keaveny as the home of a livery company, the Worshipful Company of Chartered Architects, providing space for meetings and dining and an education centre funded by the Corporation of London's CIL Neighbourhood fund.

The top of one of the gates was offered for sale by Dreweatts Auctioneers in a London sale of surplus stock from the London Architectural Salvage and Supply Co (LASSCO) on 15 June 2013.

=== Temple Bar Memorial ===
Some authorities believe that the griffin which adorns Temple Bar is a copy of the Welsh dragon. It is Said to be Curiously like it.

— Yorkshire Evening Post, Tuesday 1 March 1898

Following the removal of Wren's gate, Horace Jones, Architect and Surveyor to the City of London, designed a memorial to mark Temple Bar, which was unveiled in 1880. The Temple Bar Memorial stands in the street in front of the Royal Courts of Justice.

The elaborate pedestal in a neo-Renaissance style serves as the base for a sculpture by Charles Bell Birch of a dragon supporter (sometimes erroneously referred to as a griffin) bearing a shield of the arms of the City of London. The pedestal is decorated with statues by Joseph Boehm of Queen Victoria and her son the then Prince of Wales, the last royals to have entered the City through Wren's gate, this event is depicted in one of the reliefs which also decorate the structure, designed by sculptor Charles Henry Mabey.

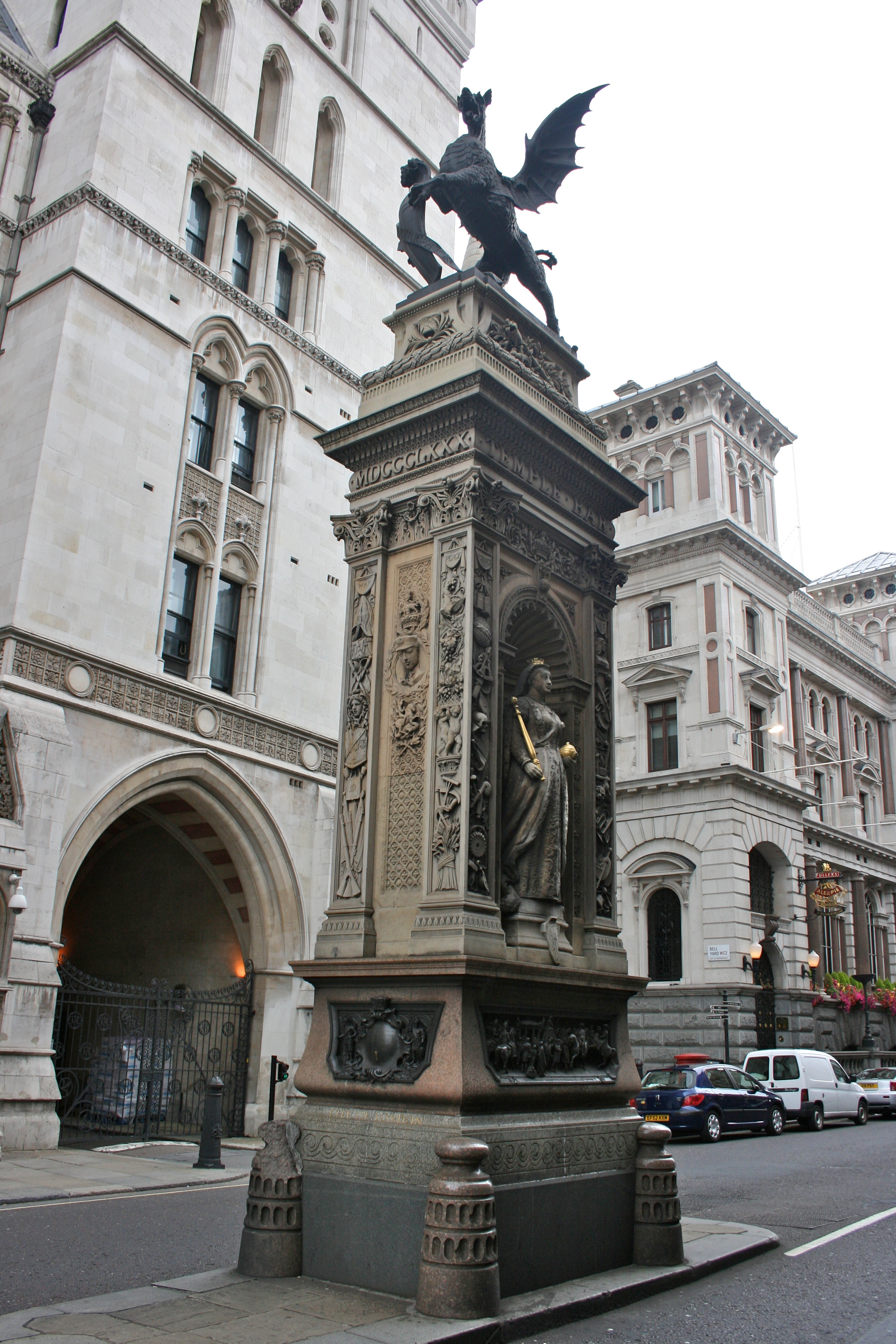
Temple Bar Memorial in 2009 (installed 1880)

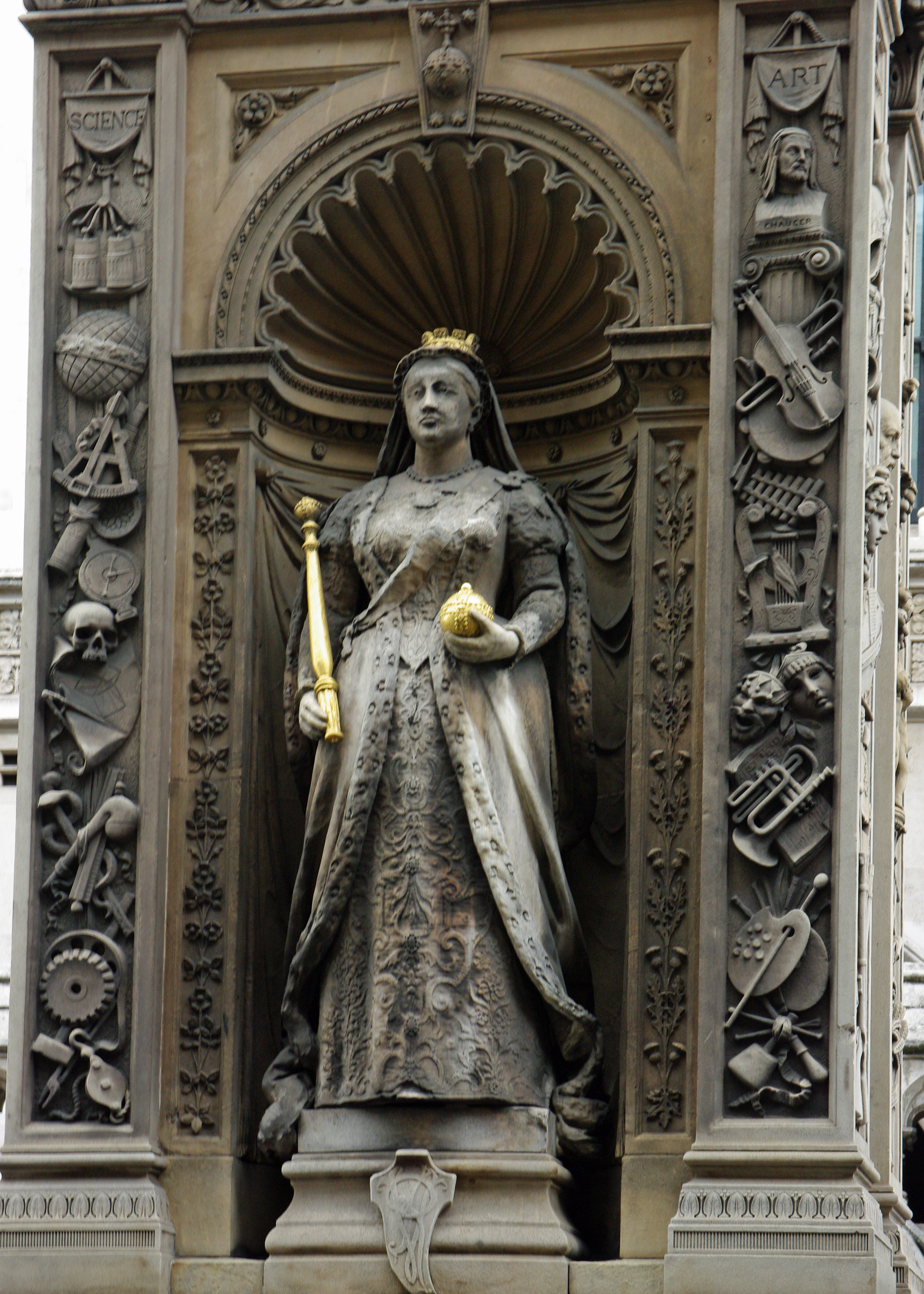
South face, Queen Victoria

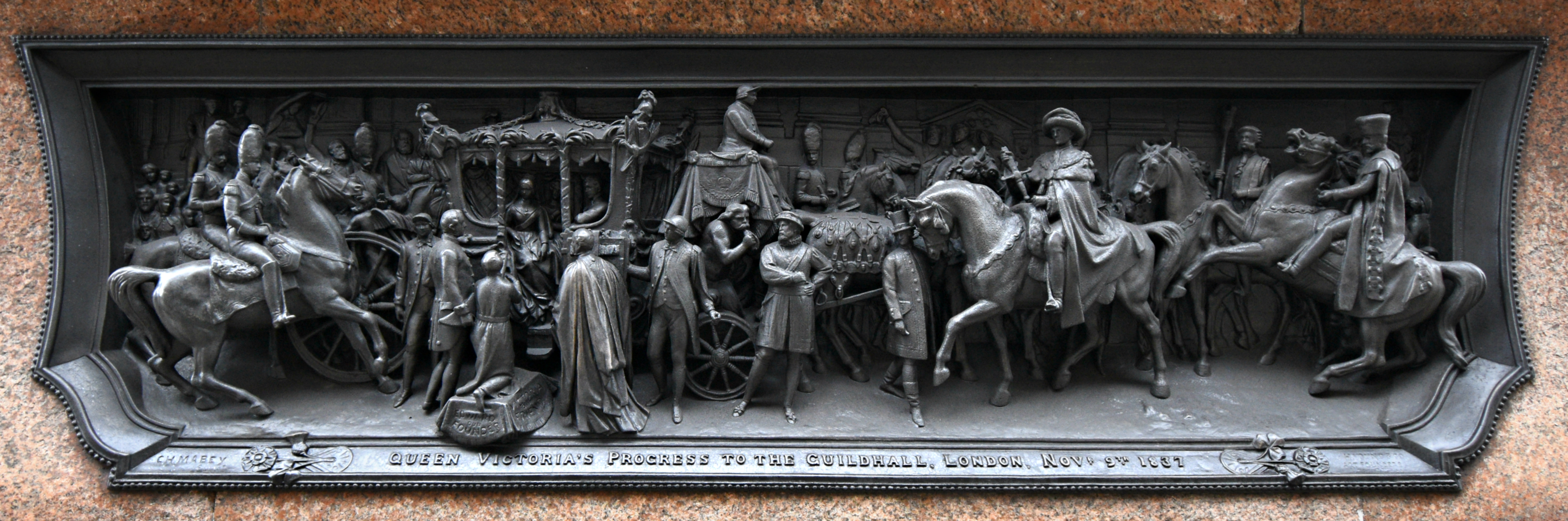
South face, Queen Victoria's Progress to the Guildhall, 1837

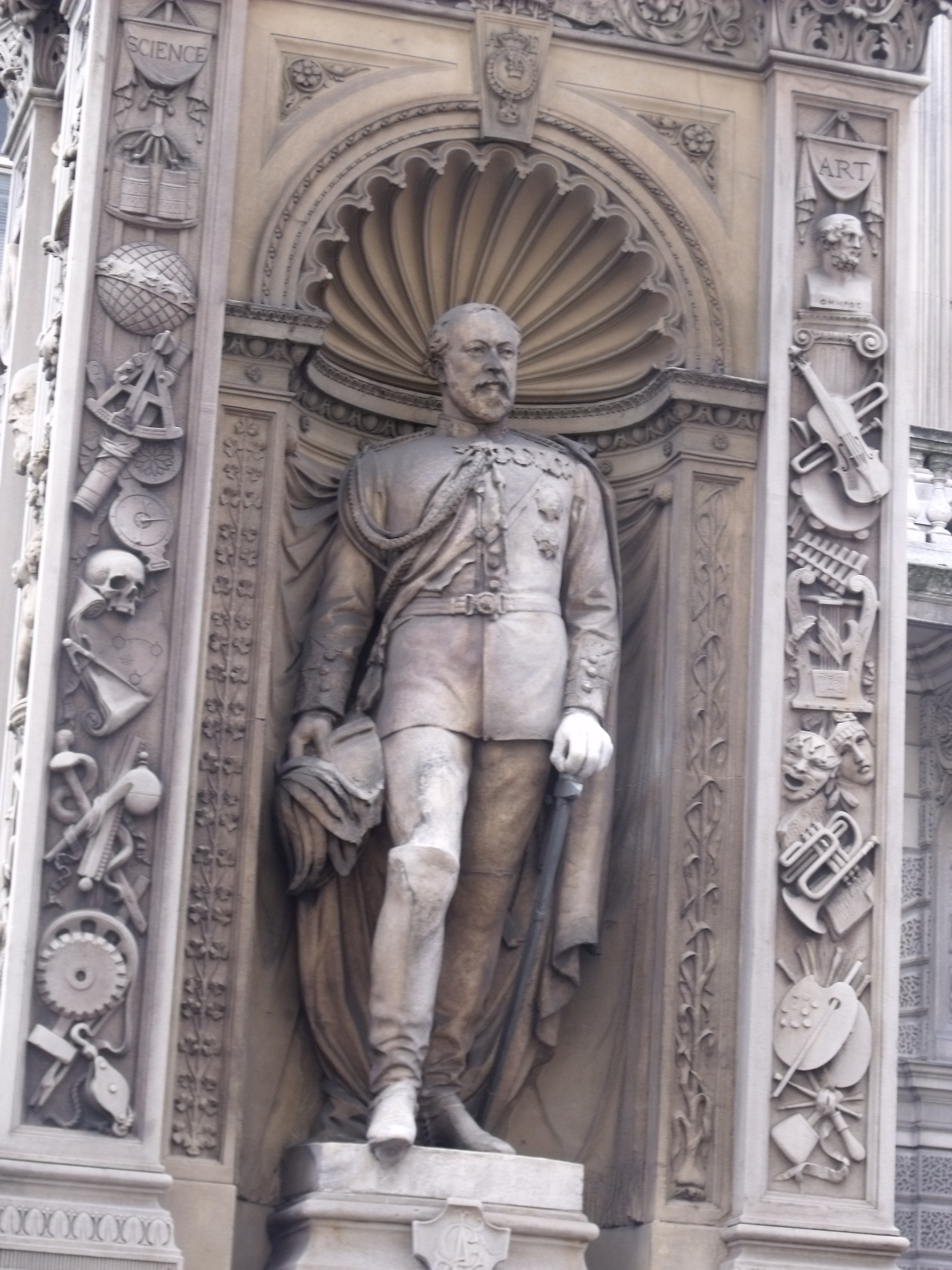
North face, Edward VII, when he was Prince of Wales

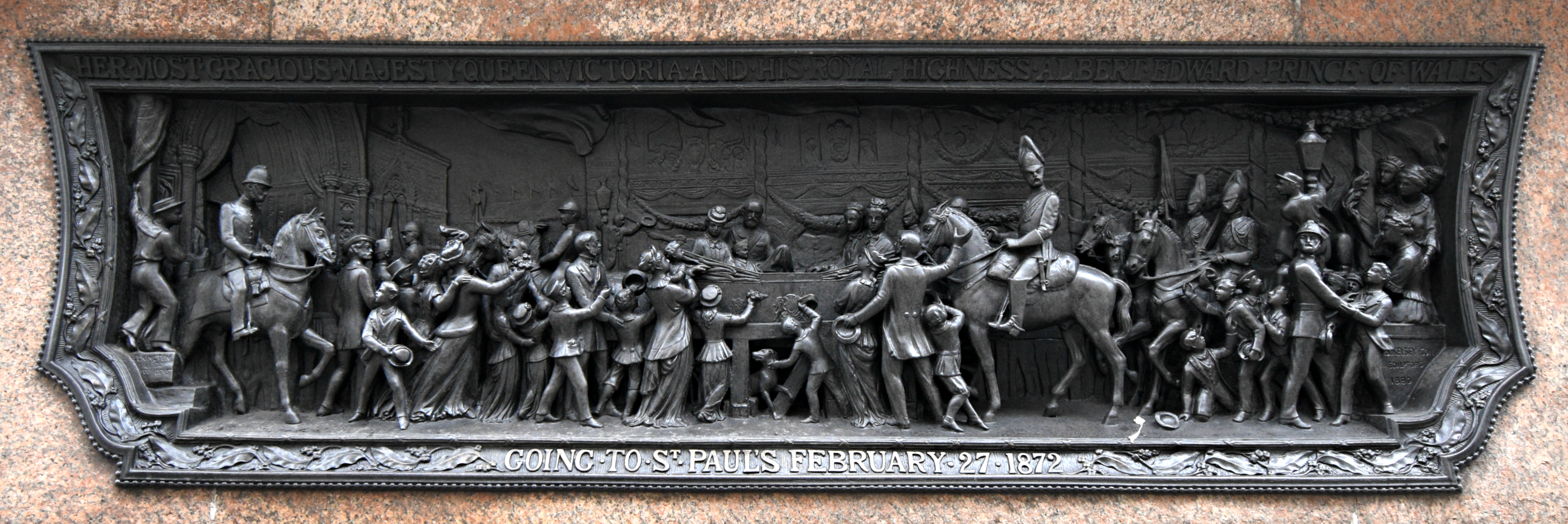
North face, Queen Victoria and the Prince (Edward VII) and Princess of Wales going to St Paul's, 1872

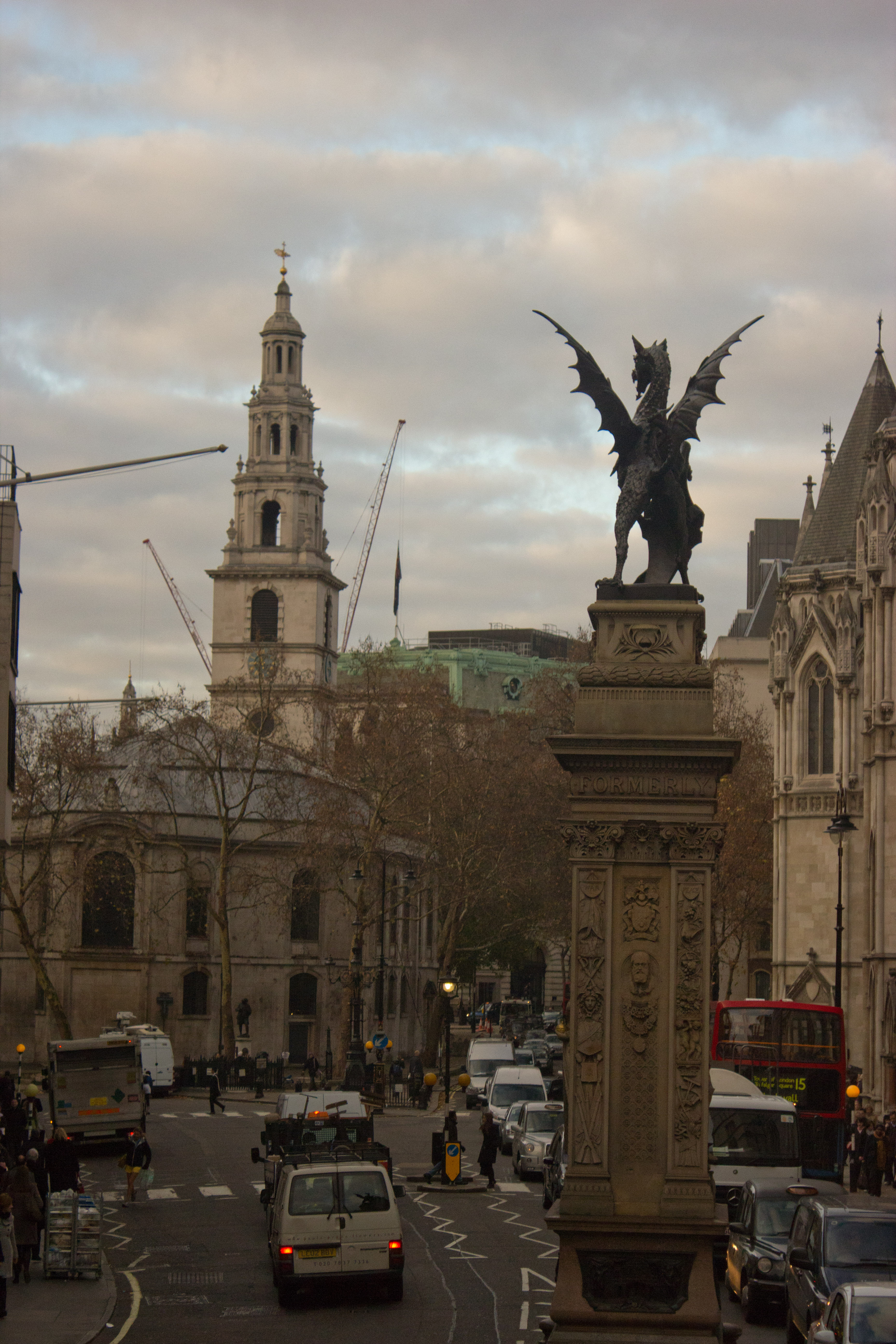
East face with St Clement Danes in the background.

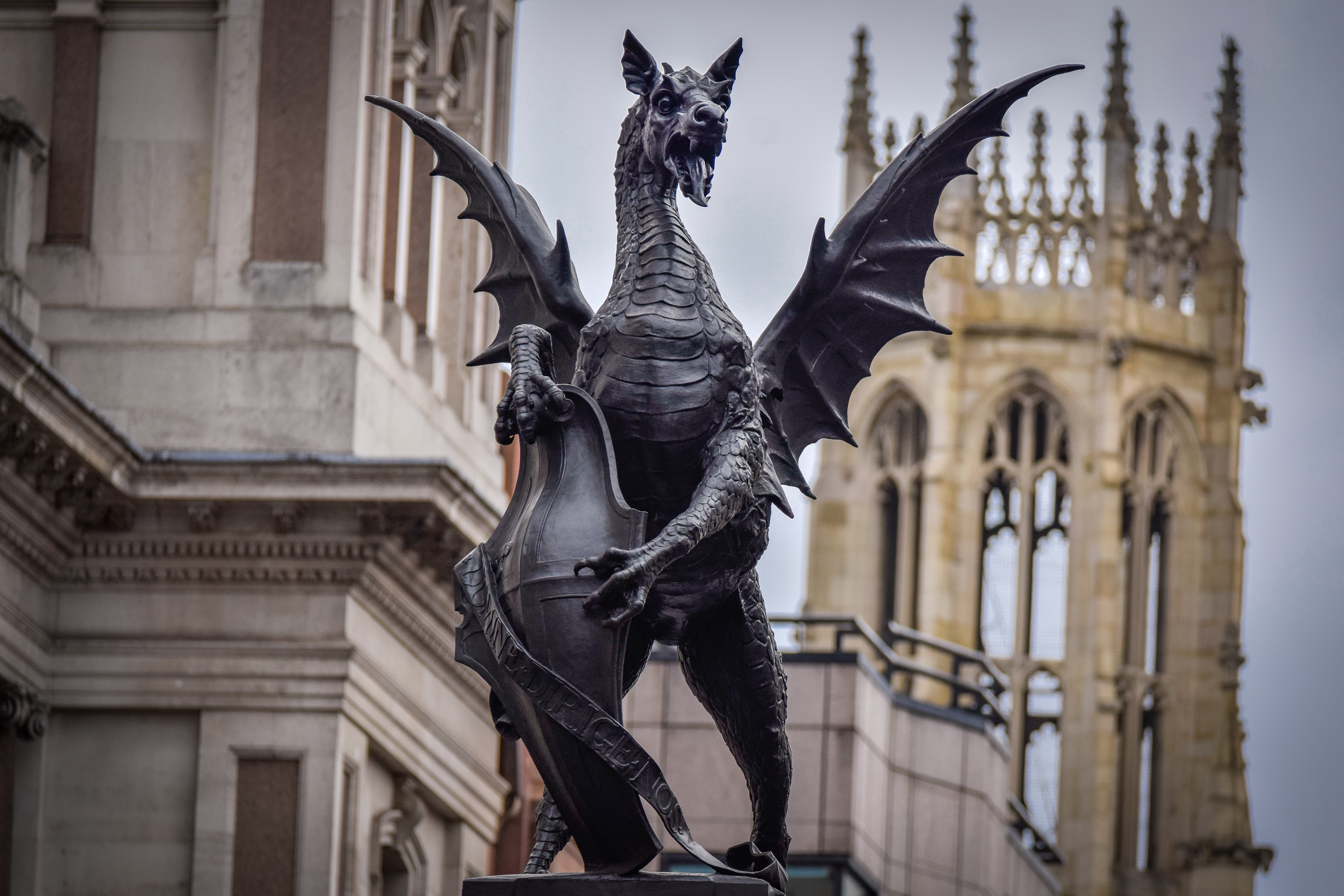
Head (west) end of the dragon

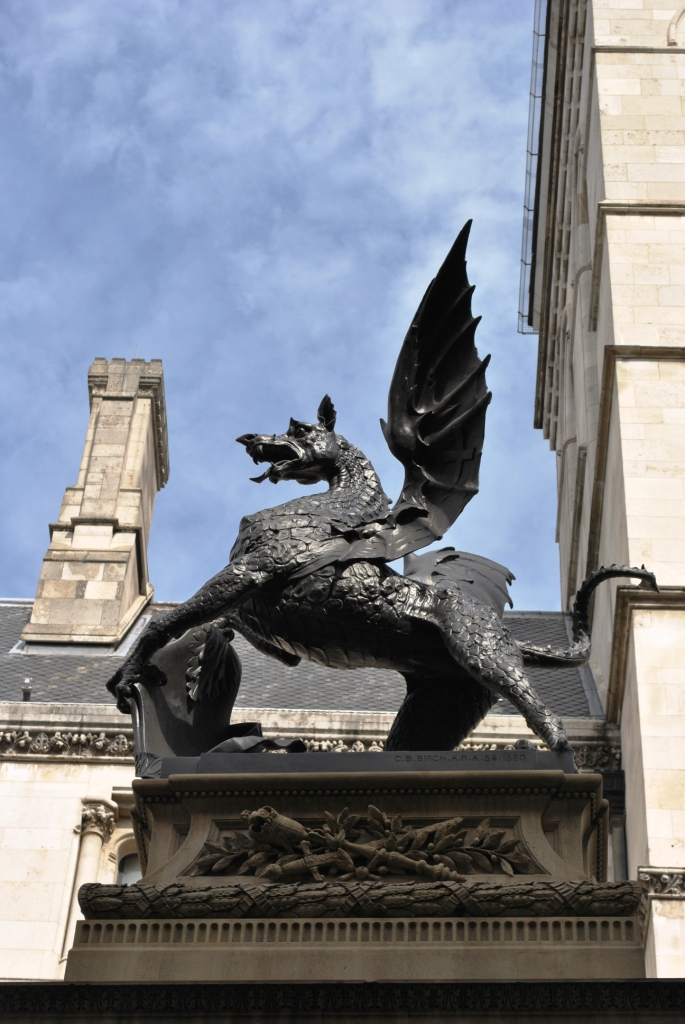
The dragon from the south

In the 1960s, similar but smaller and more subdued dragon sculptures were set at other entry points to the city. Two were originally created in 1849 by J. B. Bunning for the entrance to the Coal Exchange (and were relocated to Victoria Embankment following that building's demolition in 1962), while the others are smaller-scale versions of Bunning's design.

== In fiction ==
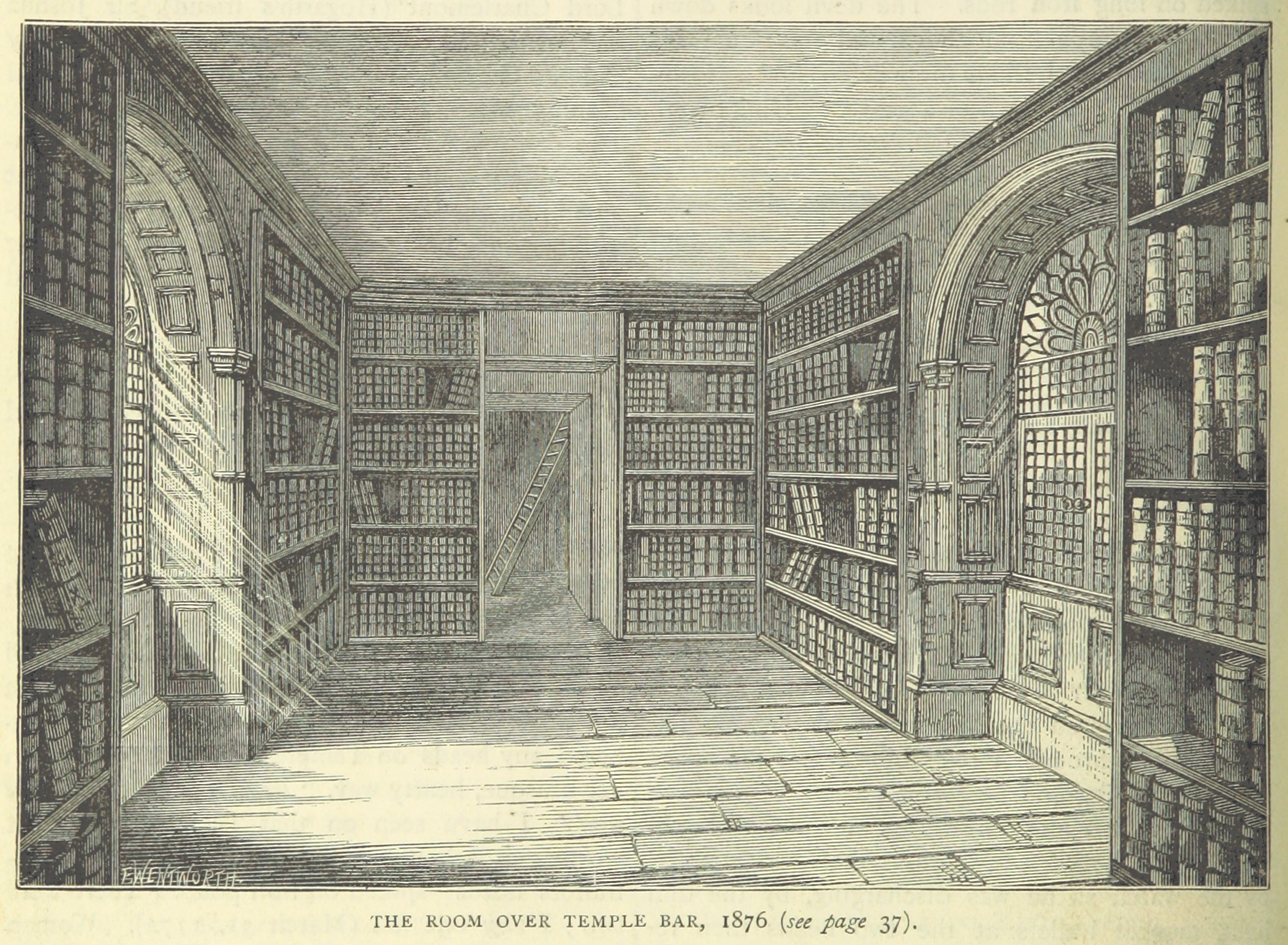
The Room over Temple Bar, 1876

Charles Dickens mentioned Temple Bar in A Tale of Two Cities (Book II, Chapter I), noting its proximity to the fictional Tellson's Bank on Fleet Street. This was in fact Child & Co., which used the upper rooms of Temple Bar as storage space. Whilst critiquing the moral poverty of late 18th-century London, Dickens wrote that in matters of crime and punishment, "putting to death was a recipe much in vogue", and illustrated the horror caused by severed heads "exposed on Temple Bar with an insensate brutality and ferocity".

In Herman Melville's "The Paradise of Bachelors and the Tartarus of Maids", he contrasts the beauty of the Temple Bar gateway at the highest point on the road leading to the hellish paper factory, which he calls a "Dantean Gateway" (in his Inferno, Dante describes the gateway to Hell, over which are written the words, "Abandon all hope, ye who enter here").

The dragon on top of the Temple Bar monument comes to life in Charlie Fletcher's children's book about London, Stoneheart.

The dragon also features in Virginia Woolf's The Years, in which one of the main characters, Martin, points "at the splayed-out figure at Temple Bar; it looked as ridiculous as usual – something between a serpent and a fowl."

== See also ==
- Dragon boundary mark
- Temple Bar, Dublin, a district of the same name in Dublin, Ireland
