= Charles Whetham =

English businessman and politician

Sir Charles Whetham (25 May 1812 – 4 September 1885) was an English businessman and politician who served as Lord Mayor of London in 1878–1879.

A native of Bridport, Dorset, Whetham became a partner in the firm of S Whetham & Sons, flax and hemp manufacturers. The company had offices in Gracechurch Street in the City of London, and Whetham moved to the capital, where he became involved in the local politics of the city. In 1843 he was elected to the Common Council as a representative of Bridge Ward. He became deputy of the ward in 1865 and became an alderman in 1871. He served as Sheriff of London and Middlesex in 1873 - 1874, during which term he was knighted. He was Master of the Worshipful Company of Leathersellers in 1873 - 1874.

He was Lord Mayor of London in 1878–1879.

A member of the Conservative Party, Whetham made one attempt to enter parliament when he contested his native constituency of Bridport at the 1875 general election, but failed to be elected.

Whetham represented the city on the Metropolitan Board of Works in 1883 - 1884. He was also a member of the Thames Conservancy Board 1883 - 1885 and Chairman of the London and Blackwall Railway Company 1870 - 1885.

In 1836 Whetham married Sophia Maria Langley, and the couple had eight children. He died at his residence in Gordon Square after a long illness in 1885.

Civic offices
Preceded by Sir Thomas Owden	Lord Mayor of London; 1878 – 1879	Succeeded by Sir Francis Wyatt Truscott
