= Dragons of the City of London =

Type of sculpture marking boundaries of the City of London

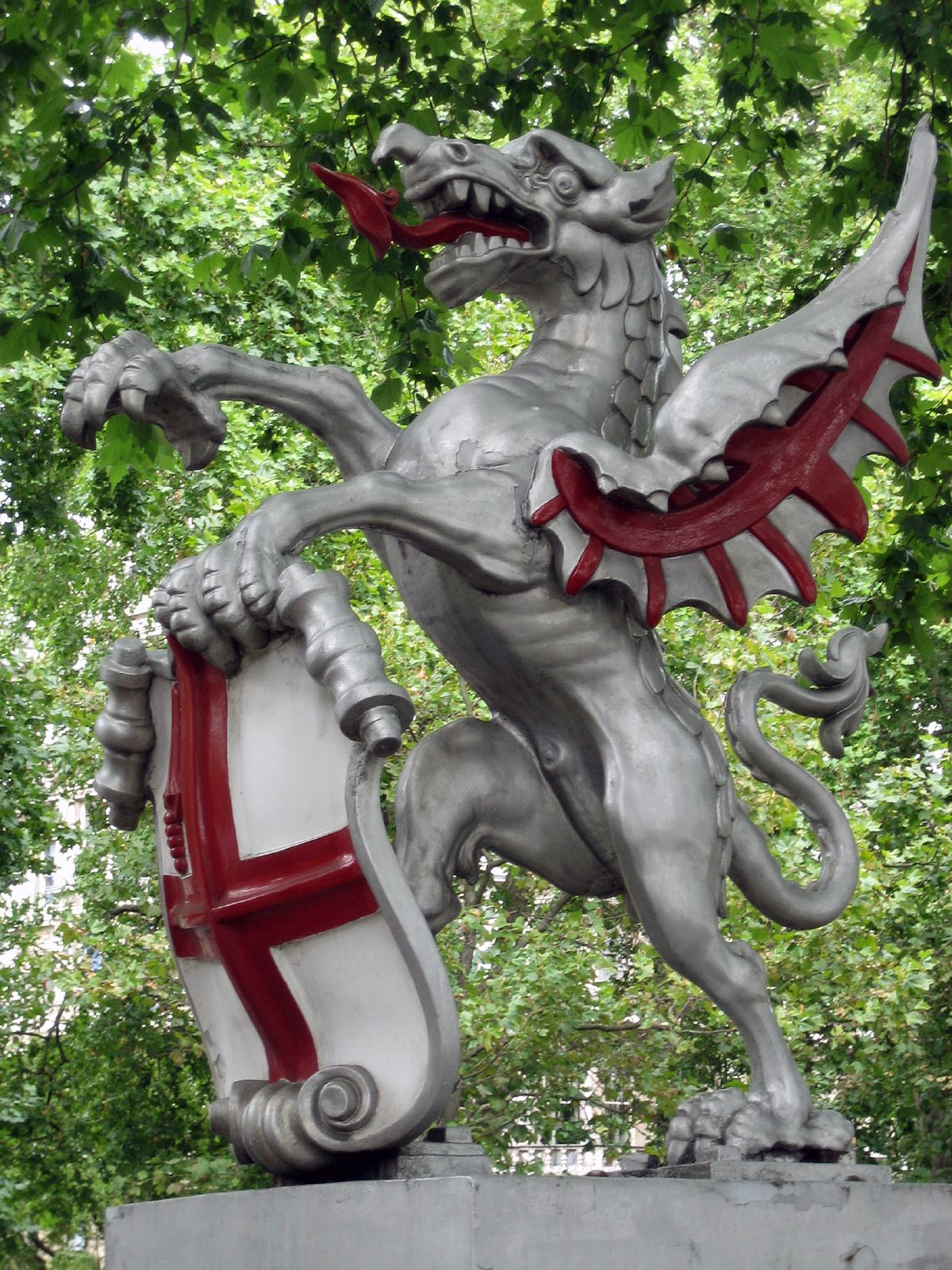
One of the two original statues from the Coal Exchange, relocated to Victoria Embankment

The dragons of the City of London are cast iron statues of dragons (sometimes mistaken for griffins) on metal or stone plinths that mark the boundaries of the City of London. The dragons are painted silver, with details of their wings and tongue picked out in red. The dragon stands on its left rear leg, with the right rear leg lifted forward to support a shield, with the right foreleg raised and the left foreleg holding the top of the shield. The shield bears the City of London's coat of arms painted in red and white: the red cross of Saint George on a white background, with a red sword in the first quarter, an attribute of Saint Paul. Saint George and Saint Paul are respectively the patron saints of England and of London. The dragon's stance is the equivalent of the rampant heraldic attitude of the supporters of the City's arms, which may allude to the legend of Saint George and the Dragon.

== Design ==
The design is based on two large dragon sculptures, 7 feet (210 cm) high, which were mounted above the entrance to the Coal Exchange on Lower Thames Street, designed by the City Architect, J. B. Bunning, and made by the London founder Dewer in 1849. The dragons were originally painted in a stone colour to match the building. They were preserved when the Coal Exchange was demolished in 1962–63. The two original statues were re-erected on 6 feet (180 cm) high plinths of Portland stone at the western boundary of the City, by Temple Gardens on Victoria Embankment, in October 1963.

The Corporation of London's Streets Committee selected the statues as the model for boundary markers for the city in 1964, in preference to the fiercer dragon by C. B. Birch at Temple Bar on Fleet Street. Half-size replicas of the original pair of dragons were made by Birmingham Guild Limited and erected at main entrances to the City of London in the late 1960s.

== Locations ==
There are now fourteen dragons around the City of London. In addition to the Birch dragon at Temple Bar, and the two original Coal Exchange statues on Victoria Embankment, there are two replicas of the Coal Exchange design at the south end of London Bridge, two on High Holborn near Gray's Inn Road, and single replicas on Aldgate High Street, Norton Folgate (north of Bishopsgate), Byward Street, Moorgate, Goswell Road (north of Aldersgate Street), Farringdon Street, and at the south end of Blackfriars Bridge.

The two original Coal Exchange dragons and their stone plinths on Victoria Embankment became Grade II listed buildings in 1972. The dragons to either side of High Holborn were mounted on granite obelisks which originally supported lanterns; these 19th-century obelisks were also listed in 1972.

Outside London, there is also a replica at Lake Havasu City, Arizona, where the 19th-century London Bridge was reconstructed in 1971.

== Gallery ==
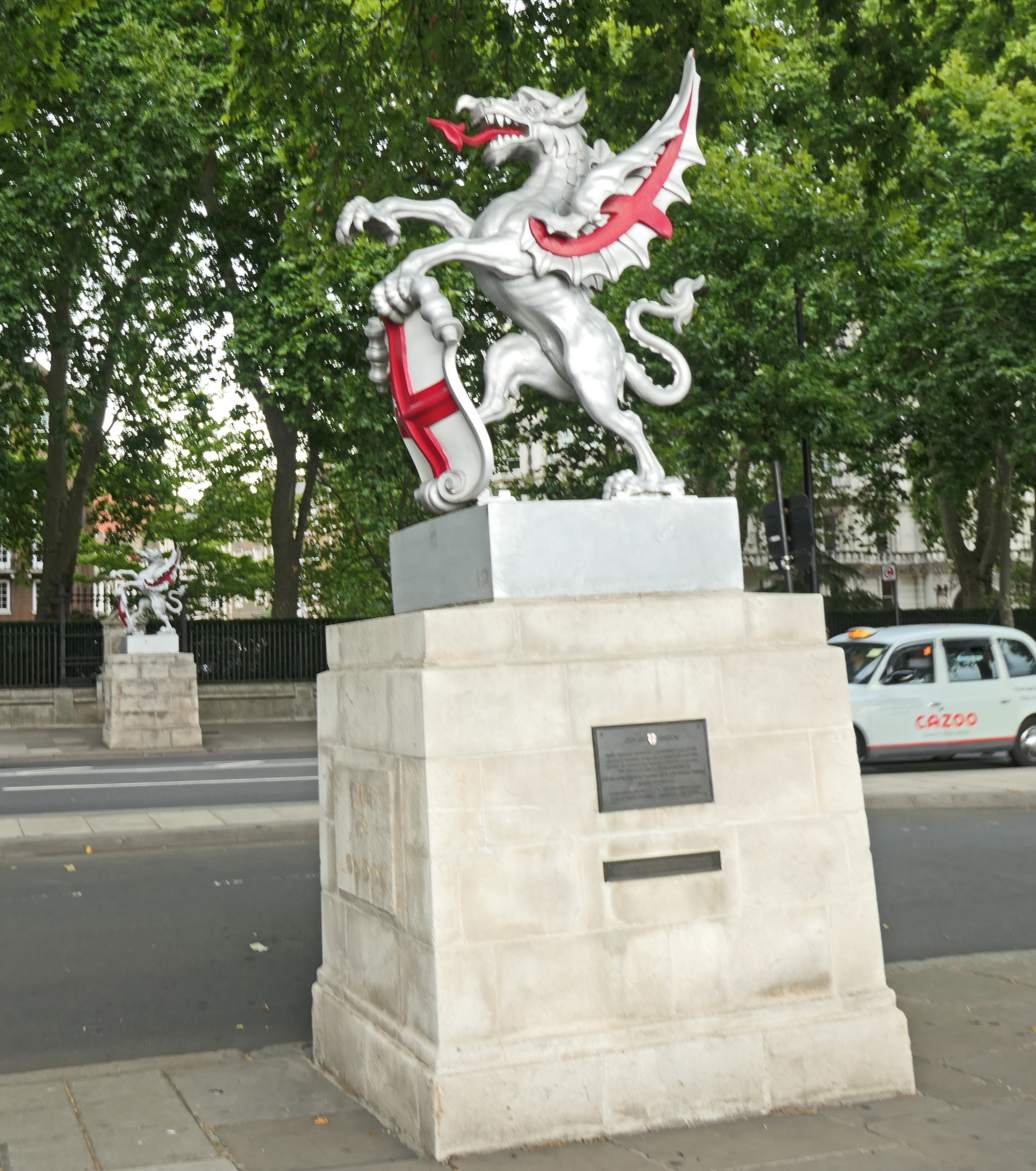
The two original 1849 statues from the Coal Exchange

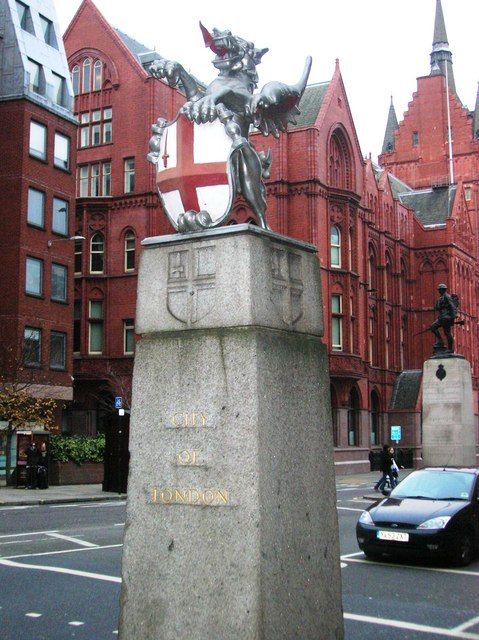
Smaller replica version on High Holborn, 1960s

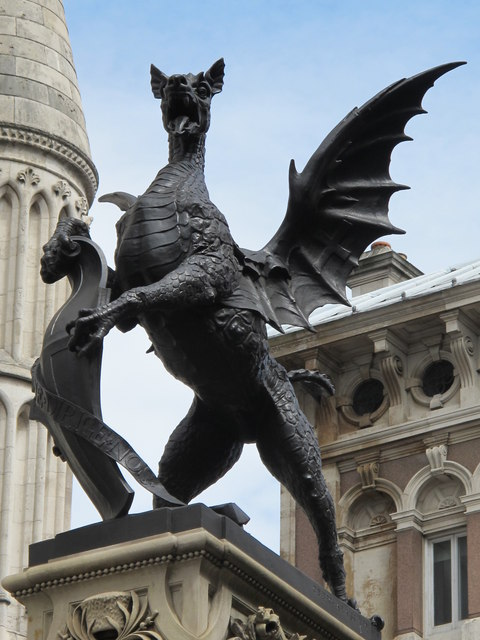
Dragon at Temple Bar, to a different design by C. B. Birch, 1880

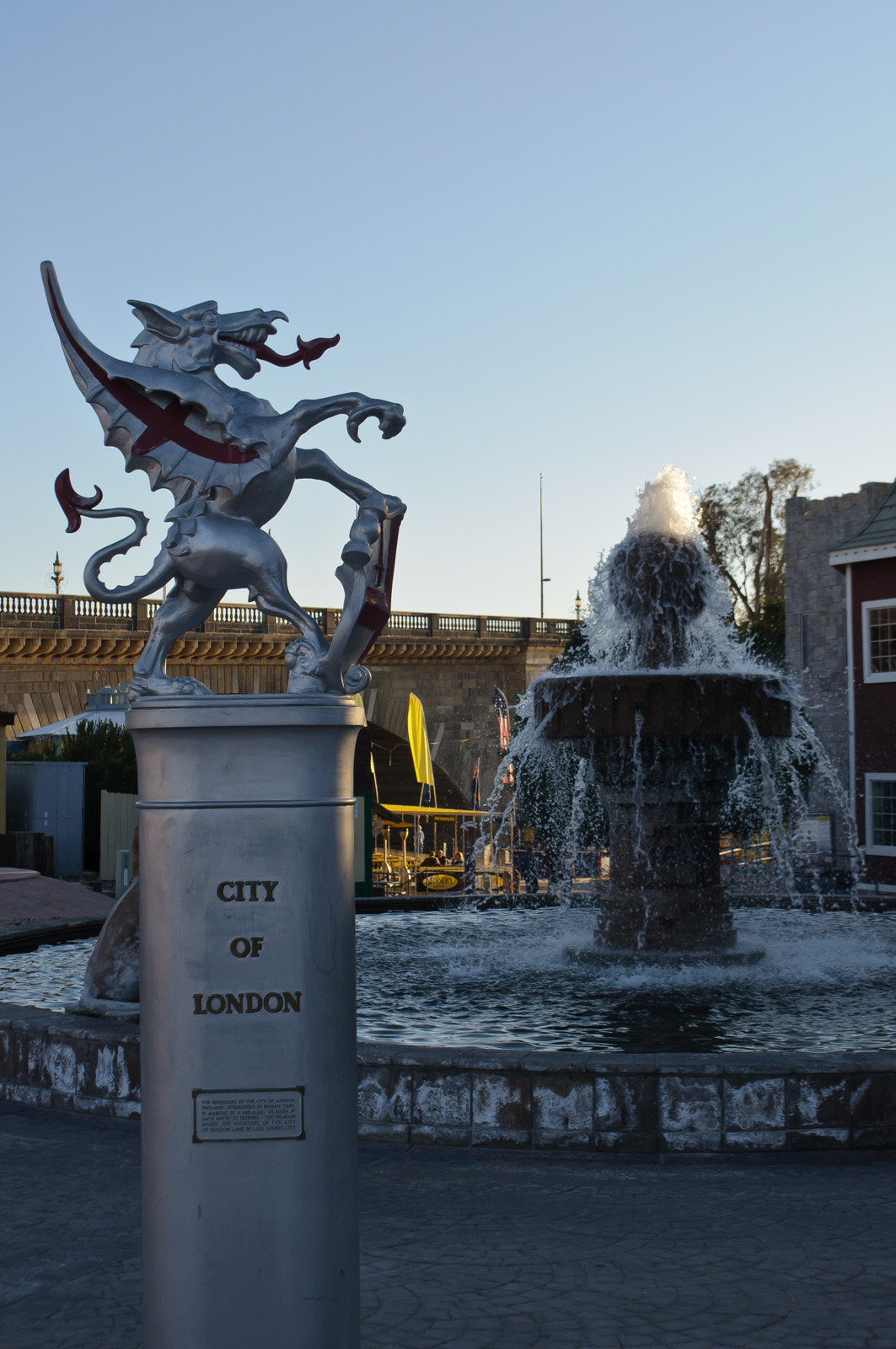
Example in Lake Havasu City, Arizona

== Sources ==
- Ward-Jackson, Philip (2003). Public Sculpture of the City of London. Liverpool: Liverpool University Press. pp. 422–423. ISBN 0-85323-977-0.
