= Royal Commission on the Amalgamation of the City and County of London =

The Royal Commission on the Amalgamation of the City and County of London was a royal commission which considered the means for amalgamating the ancient City of London with the County of London, which had been created in 1889. The commission reported in 1894. The government headed by Lord Rosebery accepted the recommendations of the commission, but when a Conservative government under Lord Salisbury came to power in 1895 the reforms were almost entirely abandoned.

== Background ==
The administration of the metropolitan area of London, and the possible reform of the ancient City of London had been prominent political topics since the 1830s. Recommendations by royal commissions given in 1837, 1854 and 1867 had largely been left unimplemented. The Local Government Act 1888 had set up a County of London which surrounded, but did not include, the square mile and main business district of the City of London. London was therefore governed by the Corporation of London at its core and the London County Council for its metropolitan area.

When the first London County Council was elected, the Progressive Party, closely allied to the parliamentary Liberals, took control. The first chairman of the LCC, Lord Rosebery, was strongly in favour of the unification of the city and county. Campaigning for the second county council elections in 1892, he set out the position of the Progressives:

The present arrangement by which a comparatively small district in the centre of London is detached from London and held aloof cannot be maintained. The object of parliament and of reformers must be that the city should be united with London as soon as possible and with as little friction as possible. Of all London reforms I lay infinitely the most stress on this, because each can supply what the other lacks, because so many reforms are contingent on it, and because you cannot have a complete municipality without it.

The Progressives increased their majority at the elections, and in November 1892 the council passed five resolutions seeking legislation to give the authority increased powers. It was resolved among other things to seek:

The unification of London, by the removal of the division of the jurisdiction between city and county, which now hampers every reform, but especially the great questions of the public services, such as water, gas, markets &c.

The Liberal Party gained control of parliament at the general election in July of that year, and in February 1893 the Government announced that a royal commission would be appointed to formulate a scheme for the unification of London. The President of the Local Government Board, H. H. Fowler, told the Commons that the commission was to have five members, of which one each were to represent the views of the city and the county council respectively. Accordingly, he wrote to both bodies in March suggesting the names of individuals who might be acceptable. The process was drawn out as the city was reluctant to cooperate.

== Membership and terms of reference ==
The royal commission was appointed on 27 March 1893, the members being:

- Leonard Henry Courtney, (chairman) Liberal Unionist member of parliament for Bodmin, who had held a number of junior ministerial posts in the Second Gladstone Ministry.
- Sir Thomas Henry Farrer, Bt., London County Council alderman, former deputy chairman of the LCC and member of the Progressive grouping. He was elevated to the peerage as Baron Farrer later in 1893.
- Robert Durning Holt, Mayor of Liverpool. In August 1893 he became the city's first Lord Mayor
- Henry Homewood Crawford, Solicitor to the Corporation of the City of London
- Edward Orford Smith, Town Clerk of Birmingham. Smith had led the campaign to obtain city status for Birmingham in 1889.

The secretary to the commission was George Edward Yorke Gleadowe.

The terms of reference were:

..to consider the proper conditions under which the amalgamation of the City and County of London can be effected, and to make specific and practical proposals for that purpose.

The commission's quorum was set at three members, and it was given full power to call witnesses and examine books, documents, registers and records. They were also permitted to visit and personally inspect any place in the United Kingdom that they deemed expedient.

== Conflict with the City ==
From the beginning of the commission's sittings the city were reluctant to have any dealings with the body. The main objection was that the terms of reference suggested a fait accompli, with the commission being given the duty of devising a method of amalgamating City and county, not whether this should go ahead. A special committee of the Common Council was established and in November 1893 advised the corporation to cease giving evidence, as the proposed merger was:

...a thing that should not be done and that the creation of a monster municipality is a thing to be utterly avoided, and the annihilation of the City equally to be avoided.

The Attorney General, Sir Charles Russell, attacked the city's attitude. The only reasons he could see for resisting the merger were a misplaced pride in the office of Lord Mayor and a "too sacred regard" for the City funds. Following the receipt of a letter from the President of the Local Government Board the City agreed to resume tendering evidence in December on the understanding that the terms of reference could be modified.

However, in February 1894, the City of London Corporation suddenly announced that they were withdrawing from furnishing evidence to the commission. The city's representative on the commission, H. Homewood Crawford, resigned with immediate effect. The Common Council wrote an open letter to The Times explaining their actions: firstly the assurances given by the President of the Local Government Board regarding the terms of reference of the commission had not been honoured; and secondly the commission was refusing to hear their evidence regarding the position, powers and duties of the vestries and other local authorities outside the city.

== The London County Council submission ==
In contrast to the city, the county council engaged enthusiastically with the commission and submitted detailed proposals for merging city and county. The main points were:

- The administrative County of London and the City of London should form a single municipal area, and be designated the "City of London". The new area would constitute a county for all purposes.
- The Corporation of the City and the London County Council would be replaced by a single body known as the "Mayor, and Commonalty and Citizens of London".
- The new corporation would inherit all the property, powers, rights, privileges and distinctions of both bodies, as well as their debts and liabilities.
- All electors qualified to elect county councillors would be citizens.
- The corporation would consist of 118 councillors and 19 aldermen, identical in composition to the county council, and would be elected in the same way.
- The Lord Mayor would be elected by the corporation in the same way as those of municipal boroughs.
- A Deputy Mayor would be elected annually, and would perform the same functions as the chairman of a county council.
- A "City Local Authority" would be formed for the area of the existing City, elected triennially by those qualified to elect county councillors. The authority would have the same functions as an incorporated vestry or district board established under the Metropolis Management Act 1855.
- The High Sheriff of London would be chosen by the new council.
- The Commissioners of Lieutenancy of the City of London would be abolished, and the Lord Mayor would be ex officio lord lieutenant and custos rotulorum of London.
- Freedom of the City of London by patrimony, apprenticeship, purchase or gift would be abolished. The new council would be empowered to award honorary freedom as a mark of distinction.
- The Honourable The Irish Society would be abolished and its charter repealed. Its property in Ireland would pass to the corporations of Derry and Coleraine, or to any elective county authority established in the future.

== The commission's report ==
The commission issued its report on 29 September 1894. The report began by summarising the attempts to reform London government since 1835 and then laid out the general principles on which the area should be governed in future. There was general agreement among the witnesses called by the commission that a two-tier structure was needed, consisting of a "central body" and a number of "local authorities". The commissioners identified four questions that needed to be answered in order to carry out the reorganisation:

1. What should be the constitution and functions of the central body?
2. How should the powers, duties and property of the existing corporation be dealt with?
3. What should be the constitution and functions of the local authority for the city and other areas of the Metropolis?
4. What should the relationship between the local authorities and the central body?

The main part of the report was accordingly divided into four sections, with detailed proposals on each of these issues.

=== Constitution and functions of the central body ===
The new central body, which was to be called the Corporation of London, or more formally the "mayor and commonalty and citizens of London", was to be the legal successor of both the existing city corporation and the London County Council. In effect the status of city was to be extended from the old City to the area of the entire county, which would be redesignated as the City of London. The new city was to be governed by a council.

==== Councillors ====
The first matter addressed was the membership and method of election of the central body. There were two competing systems of election to be considered: annual elections by thirds as happened in boroughs reformed by the Municipal Corporations Act 1835 and later legislation; or triennial elections of the whole body of councillors in the same way as county councils established under the 1888 act. The commission recommended that elections be held triennially.

==== Aldermen ====
Both borough and county councils contained a proportion of aldermen, co-opted by the councillors. In boroughs there was one alderman for every three councillors, in county councils the ratio was one to six. In place of co-option, two methods of electing aldermen were suggested to the commission. The first was that they should be nominated by the second tier of local bodies, while the second was that they be elected in the same manner as councillors, but for a six-year term. Neither suggestion found favour by the commission who recommended no change.

==== Size of council ====
The existing London County Council consisted of 118 councillors and 19 aldermen. The commission suggested that the city, which was represented by four councillors should have its representation increased to eight elected members. This was to reflect the fact that the in spite of its small population and area, the city's rateable value was one eighth of that of the whole of London. The resulting council would have 122 councillors, with a proportionate increase in the number of aldermen from 19 to 20.

==== Office of Lord Mayor ====
The post of Lord Mayor of London would be retained, and would not be restricted to the City alderman. Instead the council would have the power to elect any citizen of London as lord mayor, who would be titular chairman of the council. All ceremonies surrounding the mayoralty, and all rights and privileges were to be continued. The lord mayor was to be a justice of the peace, and also hold the offices of lord lieutenant and custos rotulorum of London.

==== Town Clerk ====
The head of staff of the county council was the deputy chairman, an elected member who received a salary for his services. In contrast the City employed a town clerk, a practice followed in municipal boroughs. The commission strongly recommended that a town clerk be appointed, independent of the parties on the council.

Additionally, and beyond its terms of reference, it suggested the creation of a number of lower-tier councils headed by mayors. Although the amalgamation did not take place, the creation of metropolitan boroughs was achieved through the London Government Act 1899.

==== Functions of the new corporation ====
The commission called for a clear division of functions between the top tier corporation and the second tier local authorities. The basic principle was that the upper body should "be relieved of all administrative details for which its intervention is not really necessary" and the local bodies should "be intrusted with every duty they can conveniently discharge". Where there was a need for "uniformity of action", the corporation would be given the power to frame bylaws which would be administered by the local bodies. The corporation would have the power to intervene where the local authority was failing to carry out its duties.

The corporation would inherit most of the powers of the county council, although the commission suggested that some of the LCC's duties would better be exercised by the local bodies. The existing City corporation was already the authority for a number of London-wide functions. These included being the sanitary authority for the Port of London, management of metropolitan markets, and the maintenance of Epping Forest and other open spaces. These would transfer to the new body. In addition the new corporation would gain powers over numerous administrative functions in the "old city", including bridges, street improvements, water supply and weights and measures.

==== Functions of the local bodies ====
The remaining duties of a municipality would fall to the second tier of local authorities. These powers would be transferred from the existing vestries, district boards and burial boards, along with various ad hoc bodies in charge of public libraries, bath and wash houses and the administration of the poor law.

=== Powers, duties and property of the old corporation ===
The commission made arrangements for the transfer of the powers and rights of the city to the new London-wide corporation or to the new local authority for the area, and a scheme was also made for a number of residual matters.

==== Transferred to the new corporation ====
- Bridges
- Markets
- The Bridge House and Blackfriars Bridge Estates: any profits left after maintaining Blackfriars, London and Tower Bridge from these estates were to be used to maintain the other crossings of the Thames maintained by the London County Council.
- The Clerkenwell Improvement Trust
- The Holborn Valley Improvement Trust
- Grain duty, which maintained a number of parks and open spaces:
  - Epping Forest
  - Burnham Beeches
  - Coulsdon Commons
  - Highgate Woods
  - Other places managed under the London Open Spaces Act 1878
- The Gresham Estates, that maintained:
  - The Royal Exchange
  - Gresham College
- The City of London Court
- The Guildhall
- The Mansion House
- The City of London School
- Ward's City of London School for Girls
- The Guildhall School of Music

From these trusts and properties the new corporation was to pay an annual sum to the local authority for the old City for the upkeep of the Freemen's Orphan School, almshouses and other charitable institutions, along with donations to hospitals in the area.

==== Ceremonial functions and shrievalty ====
The new corporation was to succeed "without breach of continuity" to the powers and possessions the former City. The lord mayor would continue to enjoy the existing rights and privileges, and it would be lawful for the corporation to vote a sum to meet the costs of the office. The lord mayor and corporation were to retain the right of special access to the Sovereign, and to present petitions to the House of Commons.

The Sheriffs of London would be chosen by the council of the new corporation in the same manner as those of counties corporate under the Municipal Corporations Act 1882.

==== Freemen and liverymen ====
The existing system of granting or succeeding to the freedom of the city was to be ended, with the privilege being in future a purely honorary title awarded by the council. The rights of existing freemen, or widows and children of freemen to access to City charities and schools was to continue. The administration of these bodies was to pass to the new local authority for the old city.

The power of granting and fixing the number of liverymen of the various livery companies was to be transferred to central government. It was suggested that the privy council, which already possessed powers of granting royal charters to such bodies elsewhere, should take on this duty.

==== Ecclesiastical patronage ====
The Municipal Corporations Act 1835 had removed the powers of borough corporations to appoint clergy. These rights had been sold to the Ecclesiastical Commissioners, with the money received invested for the benefit of the borough. The commission suggested the extension of the legislation to the city.

==== Irish Society ====
While the commission noted the county council's proposals for winding up the society, it was not in a position to make any recommendations on the matter. This was due to the fact that the City Corporation, the Irish Society and the livery companies were at the time involved in a court case in the Chancery Division of the Irish courts.

==== City of London Police ====
The commission recommended the ending of the separate police force for the City of London, and the inclusion of the area in the Metropolitan Police District. The City authorities had objected, fearing that insufficient resources would be allocated to protect the banks and other financial businesses of the area. The commissioners discounted this, finding that the business districts of provincial cities were adequately policed by borough police forces.

==== Transferred to the local authority for the "Old City" ====
The remaining powers and duties would be taken over the new local authority established for the area of the city. These included:

- Baths and washhouses
- Burial grounds
- Charitable trusts
- Poor law (although responsibility for registration of births, deaths and marriages would pass to central government)
- Public libraries

=== Constitution and functions of the local authority in the City and of the other local authorities in London ===
The commission recommended the establishment of a second tier of local authorities. One of these would cover the area of the old City, and would take over the local administrative functions of the existing corporation and Commissioners of Sewers. The rest of London would be divided into a number of areas for local administration. New local authorities would replace the existing vestries and district boards.

==== Functions of the local authorities ====
The functions the commission assigned to the local bodies included:

- Sanitary administration, including building control and drainage.
- Maintenance of main roads other than highways, small street improvements and regulation of tramways.
- Valuation and registration of voters.
- Provision and maintenance of small open spaces and mortuaries.
- Powers over electric lighting and gas supply.
- Exercise of powers to regulate overhead wires, food and drug sales.

==== Constitution of the local authorities ====
The commission considered the optimum number of members of the new local authorities. The existing Common Council of the city had 232 members, the Commissioners of Sewers had 92, while the maximum number of members of a vestry or district board was 120. It was felt that in each case the membership was too large, and did not allow for effective administration. On reviewing England and Wales outside London, it was discovered that the council of even the most populous municipal borough had no more than 72 members.

==== Council of the Old City ====
The report recommended the creation of a new local authority for the area of the existing City, to be known as the "Mayor and Council of the Old City". The electoral franchise would be the same as that for urban district councils under the Local Government Act 1894, and there would be 72 councillors. The area would be divided into 24 wards with three councillors elected for each ward. Councillors would have a three-year term of office, with one councillor in each ward retiring annually. They would be empowered to elect a mayor from among the citizens of the Old City. As a transitory measure, and in order to create a continuity with the abolished common council, the 26 existing aldermen would be entitled to sit as "additional life members" of the new council. It was expressly stated that aldermen were not to form a permanent part of the new body.

==== Other local councils ====
A number of witnesses had suggested that the councillors elected to the London-wide corporation should also be ex officio members of the local councils for the same areas as they represented. The commission accepted this proposal, which was felt would help the two tiers to keep in touch with each other.

As the electoral districts for the new corporation (and the existing London County Council) were identical to the parliamentary constituencies, it followed that the areas of the new authorities would need to consist of one or more constituencies. The governing bodies of the new areas were to be called "councils", and were to be elected in the same way as an urban district council. Councils would have the right to elect one of their members as a mayor, but their areas would not have the status of a borough. All members of the councils were to be directly elected. There were to be no co-opted aldermen on the new councils, as none existed in the existing vestries, and the commission found "no desire to adopt such an addition".

The commission identified nineteen parishes which could form "areas of local administration" without any need for boundary changes:

- Bethnal Green
- Chelsea
- Clerkenwell
- Fulham
- Hammersmith
- Hampstead
- Islington
- Kensington
- Lambeth
- Mile End Old Town
- Newington
- Paddington
- Poplar
- St George, Hanover Square
- St Marylebone
- St Pancras
- Shoreditch
- Westminster, St Margaret and St John
- Whitechapel

Elsewhere in London there would be a need for a combination of existing areas which was considered to be "a very slight alteration to present arrangements". The commission did not make any further proposals on local areas as it was beyond their powers.

=== Relations of the local authority of the Old City and of the other local authorities to the new corporation ===
The report concluded by setting out the relationship between the two tiers of local government. In part 3 the "personal connection" between the layers with members of the higher being ex officio members of the lower.

In practical administration it was proposed that the local bodies should have as much independence as possible, but with the central authority acting to ensure that local government legislation should be consistently applied throughout the Metropolis. Some of the powers exercised by the county council might be transferred to the local councils. At the same time the new corporation would be given the powers of "supervision, appeal and control", and where local councils failed to carry out their duties could do so. The new corporation would also have to give consent for the local bodies to take out loans over a certain value.

== Reaction ==
Reaction to the commissioners' proposals was sharply divided, largely on party lines, with Liberals very much in favour and Conservatives strongly opposed.

=== Liberal Party ===
A meeting of the London Liberal and Radical Union was held on 15 October to consider the commission's report. The meeting was addressed by three London members of parliament, James Stuart, Edward Pickersgill and Dadabhai Naoroji and a resolution was passed strongly approving the report. The resolution called for the government to bring in a bill in the next parliamentary session to bring the report into effect. The meeting went further than the commission, calling for the Metropolitan Asylums Board to be abolished and for the Metropolitan Police to be brought under the control of the new corporation.

=== Conservative Party ===
Lord Salisbury, leader of the opposition Conservative Party, gave an address in London on 7 November. Salisbury, who had led the government that passed the legislation creating the London County Council, had become one of its fiercest critics.

Salisbury poured scorn on the royal commission, dismissing the members as either "Radicals" or ignorant of the ways and wants of London. He described the commissioners as "about the worst men" to study the problem of metropolitan government. He warned against the "evil of over-centralisation", and declared that the idea of a single corporation for the whole of London was unworkable. The "mammoth municipality" so created would be remote from its citizens, and the councillors were unlikely "to sympathize with the wishes of their fellow-men solely and mainly on the grounds of drainage and water supply".

While he admitted of the need of a central body for some purposes, he spoke in favour of establishing a number of "municipalities of suitable size" which would encourage "local patriotism".

He then launched an attack on the county council. He alleged that it was not representative of London, as only about forty percent of the electorate participated in elections, and those who did vote were not likely to be a "quiet, sober respectable citizens" but "people with strong feelings... cranks and crotcheteers". This resulted in the county council consisting of a "very large contingent of the intense portion of mankind... moved by their special, limited, fanatical views, or by their partisan or class antipathies". The county council had become, he said "the place where Collectivist and Socialistic experiments are tried. It is the place where a new revolutionary spirit finds its instruments and collect its arms".

=== London Municipal Society ===
The London Municipal Society, which was a pro-Conservative Liberal Unionist organisation, issued its response to the report on 4 November. The society condemned the "centralising tendency" of the proposals. They agreed on the principles set out in the report that a central body should be formed for certain London-wide matters and a number of smaller local authorities below it. They differed, however, on the distribution of powers, wishing the lower tier to consist of "strong and authoritative district councils or corporations", with no duties to de done by the central body that could not be done at the local level.

=== City of London ===
On receipt of the report it was angrily rejected by the City of London. They attacked what they described as proposals for a "puppet lord mayor" and the "spoliation of the City". The commission was accused of simply adopting the county council's scheme. The reputations of the members of the commission were attacked. Courteney was described as "a philosophical and occasionally unpractical chairman", Holt and Smith were dismissed as "two gentlemen whose experiences were avowedly to provincial administration" while Farrer was an "amiable nobleman and advowed advocate of the LCC".

The Common Council of the City appointed a special committee to consider the report, and in January 1895 it presented its findings. The procedures of the commission were condemned and its conclusions described as "illogical". The Progressive Party on the county council was attacked, with its "real object" being to supplant the City corporation.

The committee felt that, if they had acted properly, the commissioners would have been "bound to report in favour of a scheme for the government of London based on the establishment in the Metropolis of a number of separate municipalities." The city's preferred scheme was "...the creation of separate municipal corporations, each consisting of a mayor, aldermen and councillors... (and) ...the creation of a central body or council composed of representatives from the whole of the metropolis, with the aldermen added by the several metropolitan municipalities in lieu of the undesirable system of co-optation."

=== The Government ===
In December 1894, the Home Secretary, H H Asquith, attended a meeting in the same hall in which Lord Salisbury had spoken a month before. The meeting passed a resolution "earnestly appealing to the Government to give effect during the next session to give effect to the recommendations of the commissioners." In reply Asquith promised to carry this forward. He also made a reply to Salisbury's comments, defending the members of the commission. Two of them were intimately connected with England's largest and best governed municipalities. It was hoped that the government of London might be raised to the level of that of Birmingham and Liverpool. Of the other two "Radicals" one was in fact a member of Salisbury's own political grouping and a dogged critic of the government, while the other was one of the country's most distinguished civil servants.

Asquith attributed Salisbury's assault on the county council as regret at having created it, and his sudden interest in creating a number of boroughs was not due to "his love of municipalities, (but) to his hatred of the County Council." He dismissed the scheme for a number of municipalities in scathing terms:

Why they cannot even agree whether they are going to have eight, ten, twelve or fourteen of these mammoth municipalities. Where are they going to draw their boundaries? Who wants them? So far as I can see, nobody in London.

In March 1894, Lord Rosebery, former chairman of the London County Council, had become prime minister. Unsurprisingly, he was highly supportive of the commission's proposals. He gave a speech at the opening of Clerkenwell Town Hall in June 1895 where he declared that those who opposed unification were facing an "irresistible movement"... "not a matter of party clamour, but a natural force", To continue to maintain "two Londons" would be a "civil war". He announced that the bill for the unification of London was already in print, ready to be introduced to parliament. The bill, he stated "follows almost strictly and literally the recommendations of (the) commission".

== Change of government and the London Government Act 1899 ==
In June 1895 a general election brought the Conservatives under Lord Salisbury to power. With the change of government, there was no prospect of any amalgamation legislation being introduced in the short term.

The reorganisation of London government continued to be a political issue, however, particularly in the London County Council. In November 1895 the majority Progressive Party on the council promoted a motion seeking the transfer of powers from the city to the county. The opposition Moderate Party countered with a motion seeking to transfer powers from the county council to the vestries. In November 1897 the Conference of the National Union of Conservative and Constitutional Associations passed a resolution calling on the government to pass legislation to decentralise local government in London.

The government introduced the London Government Bill to the House of Commons on 1 March 1899. The bill sought to strengthen parish-level government in London at the expense of the county council, by dividing the whole of the administrative county of London into metropolitan boroughs. The metropolitan boroughs were to receive the transfer of some minor powers from the county council, and were to have councils each consisting of a mayor, aldermen and councillors. The Times, in an opinion piece, believed that the bill "had probably brought to its last stage the long controversy as to the form of government best suited to the needs of London." The newspaper's correspondent continued that the bill would render "the attainment of such unity (of City and county) more difficult". The bill was vigorously opposed by the Liberals and Progressives, but received the royal assent on 13 July. The twenty-eight metropolitan boroughs came into existence on 1 November 1900.

== See also ==
- Royal Commission on the City of London
