= Denis Truscott =

British businessman and Lord Mayor of London (1908–1989)

Sir Denis Henry Truscott (9 July 1908 – 4 February 1989) was a British businessman who served as the Lord Mayor of London from 1957 to 1958.

== Life ==
He was the son of Henry Dexter Truscott and his wife Evelyn Metcalf Gibbes, and grandson of Francis Wyatt Truscott. He was educated at Bilton Grange and Rugby School, and went on to Magdalene College, Cambridge.

Truscott refused the baronetcy which was customarily conferred on lord mayors, and was instead appointed a Knight Grand Cross of the Order of the British Empire.
