= Coal Exchange, London =

London Coal Exchange
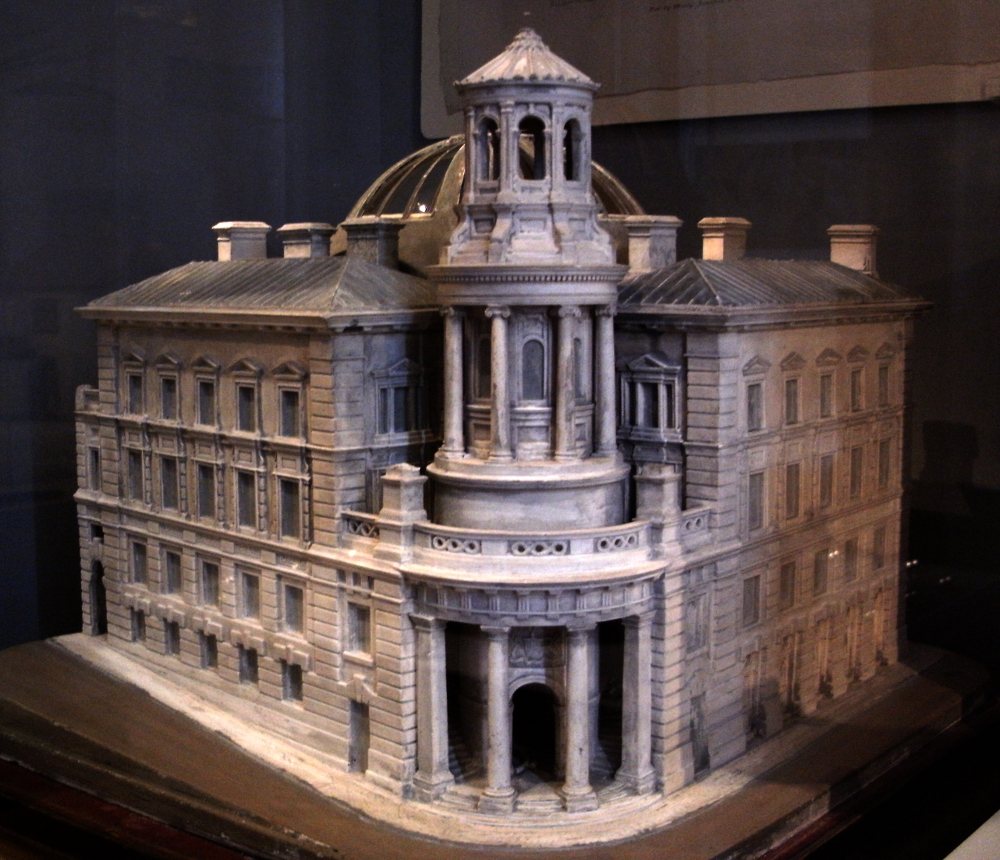
- James Bunstone Bunning's design model for the Coal Exchange, held by the Royal Institute of British Architects and displayed by the Victoria and Albert Museum.

- Location within City of London
- Alternative names: The third London Coal Exchange building

General information
- Status: Demolished
- Type: Trading exchange
- Architectural style: Italianate style
- Location: Thames Street, City of London, United Kingdom
- Coordinates: 51.5094°N 0.0835°W
- Construction started: December 1847
- Completed: 1849
- Inaugurated: 30 October 1849 by Prince Albert
- Demolished: November 1962
- Owner: Corporation of London

Technical details
- Structural system: Cast iron
- Material: Portland stone
- Floor count: 4

Design and construction
- Architect: James Bunstone Bunning

The London Coal Exchange was situated on the north side of Thames Street in the City of London, nearly opposite to Old Billingsgate Market, occupying three different structures from 1770 to 1962. The original coal exchange opened in 1770. A second building from 1805 was replaced by a new purpose-built structure constructed from 1847 to 1849, and opened by Prince Albert on 30 October 1849. This third London coal exchange was one of the first substantial buildings constructed from cast iron, built several years before the hall at the Great Exhibition. It was demolished in 1962 to allow widening of what is now Lower Thames Street despite a campaign by the Victorian Society to save the building. Cast iron decorations from the 1849 Coal Exchange building were selected as the model for the dragon boundary mark for the main entrances to the City of London.

== Background ==
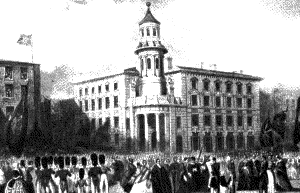
Exterior of the 1849 London Coal Exchange, c.1844, from Mogg's New Picture of London and Visitor's Guide to its Sights

Coal had been imported to London by sea since at least medieval times. A coal exchange was established in 1770 on Thames Street in the City of London, near the site of Smart's Quay and close to Billingsgate Market; the main trades at Billingsgate Dock were fish and coal. The market was established by the main coal merchants as a private body to regulate and control the trade of coal in the capital. A new building had been built in 1805, with a recessed classical portico supported by small Doric pillars and triangular pediment above, with stone steps leading to a quadrangle within.

Under the control of the City Corporation from 1807, the Coal Exchange became a free and open market, regulated by various Acts of Parliament, including Acts in 1831, 1838 and 1845.

At this period, London was heated almost entirely by coal. By 1854, approximately 3.5 million tons of coal was being transported each year from the coalfields in Northumberland and Durham to London.

Historically, coal taxes, payable on each chaldron of 35 bushels or the imperial ton) were charged by the City based on volume measurements. A public measurement system, called metage, prevailed. Officials, called sea meters, measured the coal delivered from ship to barge; others, called land meters, measured coal into standard sacks at the quayside. Monies owing to vendors, and to the Crown and City for taxes, were calculated with reference to the metage.

A coal duty of 4 pence was confirmed by James I, with a duty of 8 pence more added under William III and Mary II, and an additional 1 pence added to fund the construction of the new Coal Exchange. By 1845, a petition was made to build a new exchange, and the City Clerk of Works, James Bunstone Bunning, produced a design, which was displayed in the form of an architectural model at the 1847 Royal Academy Summer Exhibition. Construction started in December 1847 and the new Coal Exchange was formally opened by Prince Albert on 30 October 1849. The Lord Mayor and City MP, James Duke, was made a baronet in honour of the occasion.

== Description ==
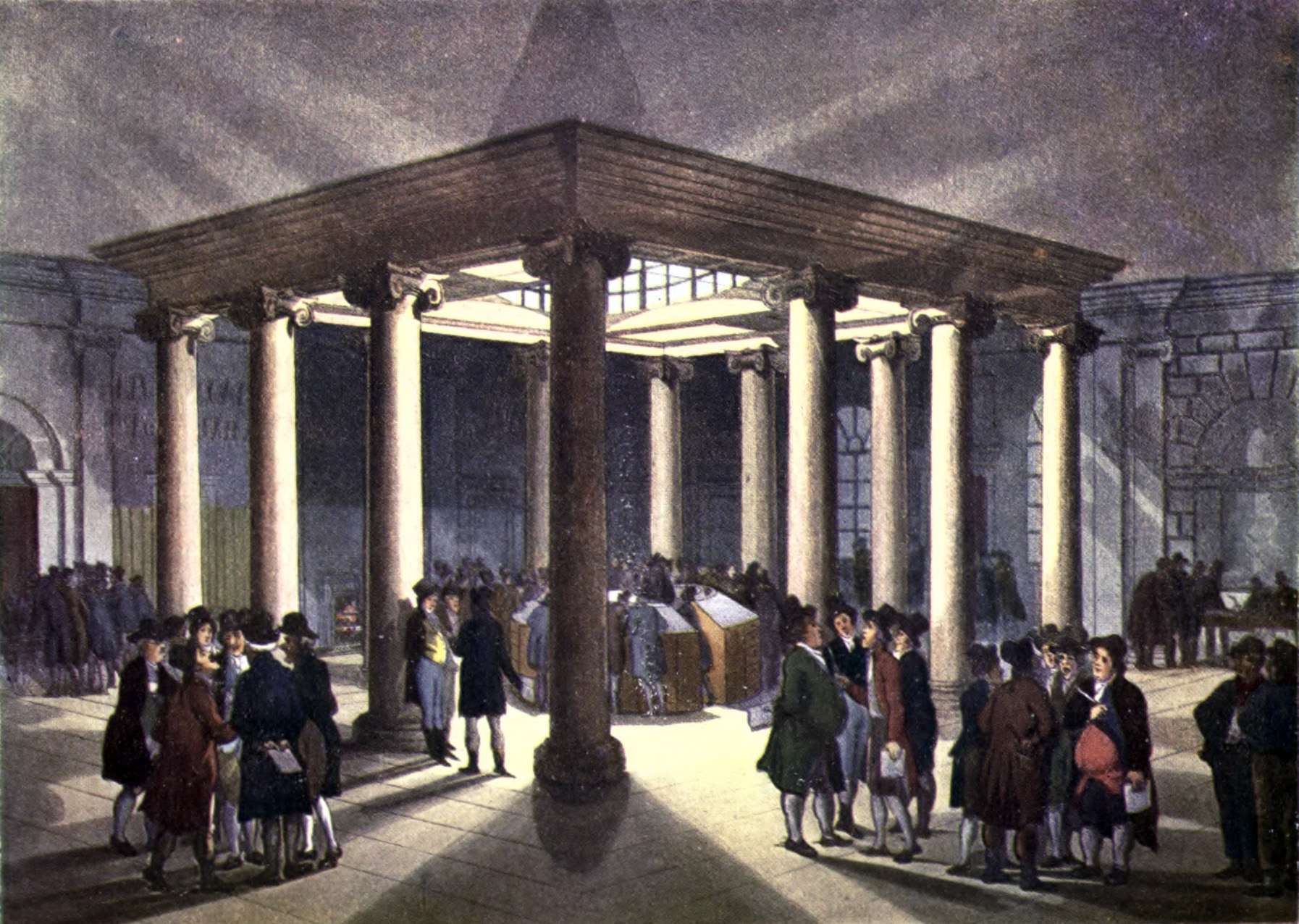
Interior of the 1805 London Coal Exchange. C.1808

The new Coal Exchange was built on the north side of Thames Street, on the east side of its junction with St. Mary-at-Hill, with four floors. A Roman hypocaust was found during the excavation of the building's foundations, part of the Roman house at Billingsgate, and preserved in its basement and is now a scheduled monument.

The south and west fronts, facing the streets, were built in Italianate style from Portland stone, with four floors, measuring 112 feet (34 m) wide and 61 feet (19 m) high. At the southwest corner was an unusual high semi-circular portico with Doric columns and entablature, surmounted by a tower of Portland stone 109 feet (33 m) high, with a conical roof topped by a gilt ball. Within the tower was a staircase providing access to the upper floors. The ground floor portico provided access to an entrance vestibule leading to a large central circular vaulted hall. The central rotunda was 60 feet (18 m) in diameter, with a wooden floor inlaid with a large mariner's compass. The rotunda was covered by a glazed cast iron dome with its centre 74 feet (23 m) above the ground, held up by 8 cast iron piers, supported by 32 ribs 42 ft 6in long.

The dome design was based on that of the Bourse de commerce of Paris by François-Joseph Bélanger and François Brunet, completed in 1811. The dome was decorated with "Raphaelesque" encaustic panels by Frederick Sang on a coal-related theme, depicting fossils of ferns, palms and other plants, and images of collieries and mining operations, and views of North Shields, Sunderland, Newcastle upon Tyne and Durham together, with cast iron decorative features. The piers also supported three tiers of cast iron galleries which opened on to offices around the exterior of the building which were occupied by coal factors and other agents and merchants connected with the coal trade.

== Demolition ==
The building suffered some damage in the Second World War, and it ceased to be used as a coal exchange after the war when the coal industry was nationalised. It was then used as offices, but the City of London did not proceed with plans to refurbish the building in the 1950s because its demolition had been suggested to allow widening of the road from Blackfriars to the East End, and it became progressively more dilapidated. Nonetheless, in the 1950s, Professor Henry-Russell Hitchcock described it as "the prime city monument of the early Victorian period".

In September 1956, John Betjeman (a founding member of the Victorian Society and a passionate defender of Victorian architecture) gave a speech to the Society for the Protection of Ancient Buildings in the rotunda of the Coal Exchange to argue for its preservation. It became a Grade II listed building in 1958. A letter published in The Times and signed by Walter Gropius, Sigfried Giedion, Josep Lluís Sert and Eduard Sekler described the Coal Exchange as "a landmark in the history of early iron construction".

Various alternatives were proposed. The Georgian Group and the Victorian Society both favoured preservation of the Coal Exchange, even if that meant that the "very dull, plain and ordinary" rear parts of the nearby Grade I listed Custom House (then the headquarters of HM Customs & Excise) were removed. Others suggested a scheme in which a walkway would be added in arches under the Coal Exchange. There was also a suggestion that the dome could become part of the new Royal School of Music in the Barbican, or shipped to Australia to become part of the National Gallery of Victoria in Melbourne, but funds were not available.

MP Tom Driberg made a speech in an adjournment debate in February 1961, quoting a statement by Sir Mortimer Wheeler published in The Times the previous day, saying that "Professor Pevsner has placed the threatened London Coal Exchange among the twelve irreplaceable buildings of 19th century England ... It expresses an era of urban revolution as no other surviving building is capable of doing ... The Coal Exchange is a national monument in the fullest sense of the phrase, and its destruction would be unforgivable."

Despite campaigns and protests, it was demolished in November 1962 to make way for a "vital" widening of Lower Thames Street. The demolition of the Coal Exchange was described by author Hermione Hobhouse as "one of the great conservationist horror stories".

Cast iron dragons which were mounted on the eaves parapet above the entrance to the Coal Exchange were preserved and were erected as dragon boundary marks in October 1963 in Temple Gardens on Victoria Embankment.

== See also ==
- Coal-tax post
- Limitation of the Vend

== Sources ==
- "Bourse de Commerce". Structurae (in French).
- London, 1808-1870: The Infernal Wen, Francis Henry Wollaston Sheppard, pp. 192–195
- Public sculpture of the city of London, Philip Ward-Jackson, pp. 422–423
- Hand-book of London: past and present, Peter Cunningham, pp. 130–131
- Politics and Preservation: A Policy History of the Built Heritage 1882-1996, John Delafons, pp. 83–84
- Engraving of the old Coal Exchange in the 1830s
- Hansard, House of Commons debates, 9 February 1961, vol 634 cc783-94
- Knight's cyclopædia of London, 1851 edited by Charles Knight, pp. 492–497
- Lower Thames Street, Old and New London: Volume 2 (1878), pp. 41–60
- London Coal Exchange, victorianlondon.org
- Photograph of the Coal Exchange, Courtauld Institute
- Images of the Coal Exchange from the City of London archive
- Image of the new Coal Exchange from the River Thames, behind Billingsgate Market and the Customs House
- The opening of the new Coal Exchange by Prince Albert of Saxe-Coburg-Gotha, National Portrait Gallery, engraving published 1851
- Hansard, House of Commons debates, 22 May 1889, vol 336 cc701-67 (description of the coal duties in London)
- Velkar, Aashish (2008). "Caveat Emptor: Abolishing Public Measurements, Standardizing Quantities, and Enhancing Market Transparency in the London Coal Trade c1830". Enterprise & Society. 9 (2): 281–313. doi:10.1093/es/khn003. JSTOR 23701369.
