= Homewood Crawford =

British solicitor

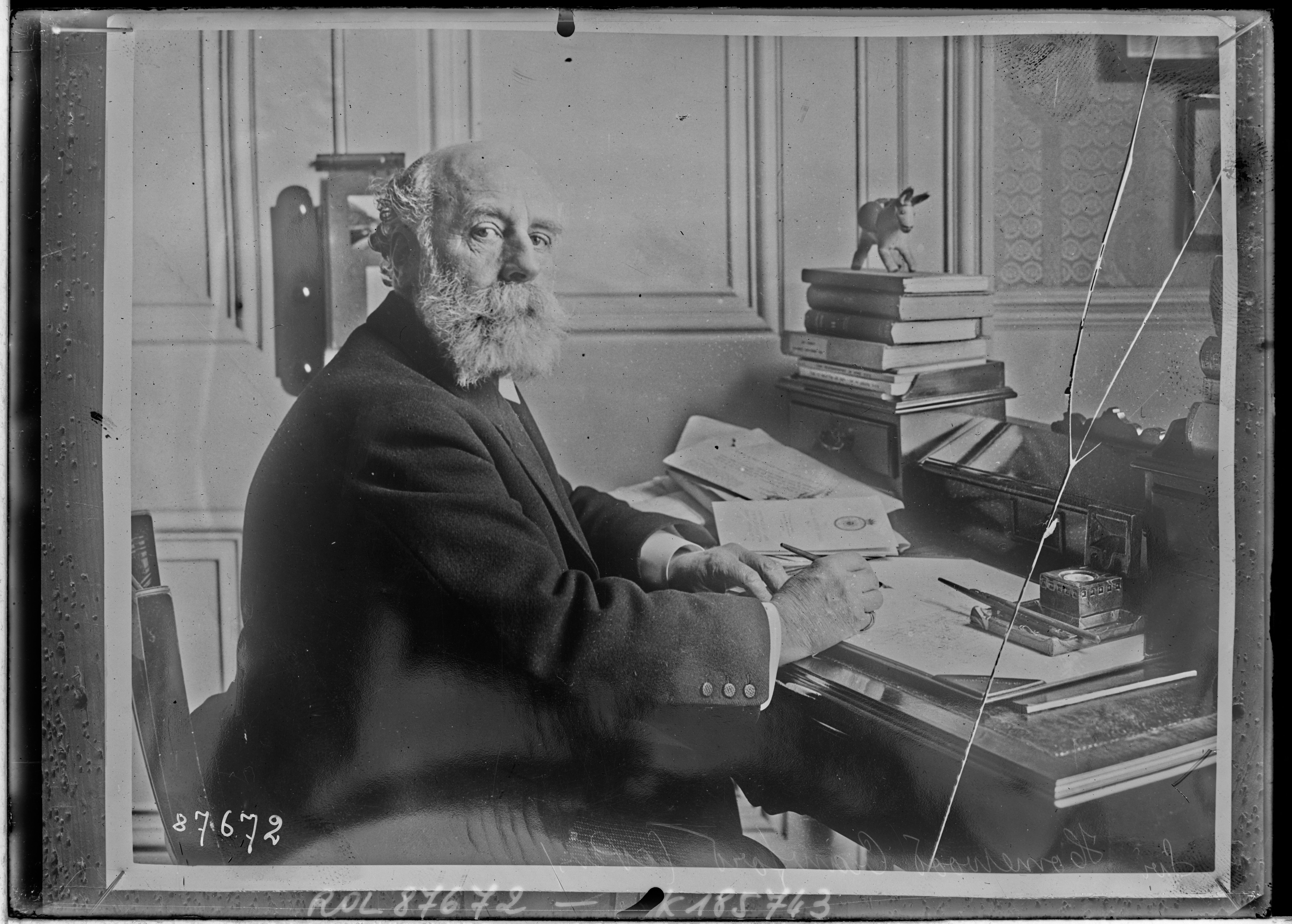

Sir Henry Homewood Crawford CVO (12 June 1850 – 17 November 1936) was a British solicitor, prominent in the livery companies of the City of London and the National Association of Local Government Officers (NALGO).

Crawford was educated at Thanet College and in France before qualifying as a solicitor in 1872. Two years later, he married Louisa Truscott, the daughter of Sir Francis Wyatt Truscott, who later became Lord Mayor of London.

Crawford set up a partnership, Crawford and Chester, and attracted work as the solicitor for the Vintners' Company. He also served as Under-Sheriff of London and Middlesex, in which role he declared Queen Victoria to be Empress of India, and as the city's Land Tax Commissioner.

In 1885, Crawford left private practice to become the Solicitor to the Corporation of the City of London, a position he held until 1924. While in post, he served as Master of several guilds: the Fanmakers' Company, Glovers' Company and Musicians' Company. In 1893, he served on the Royal Commission on the Amalgamation of the City and County of London.

A founding member of the Municipal Officers' Association, Crawford served as its president. It became part of NALGO in 1905, and Crawford was NALGO's second president, serving from 1907 until 1924. In his spare time, he was also prominent in the Freemasons. He was knighted in the 1900 Birthday Honours, and In the 1924 New Year Honours he was made a Commander of the Royal Victorian Order.

Trade union offices
Preceded by E. R. Pickmere	President of the National Association of Local Government Officers; 1907–1924	Succeeded by Arthur P. Johnson
