= Francis Wyatt Truscott =

English businessman and Lord Mayor of London (1824–1895)

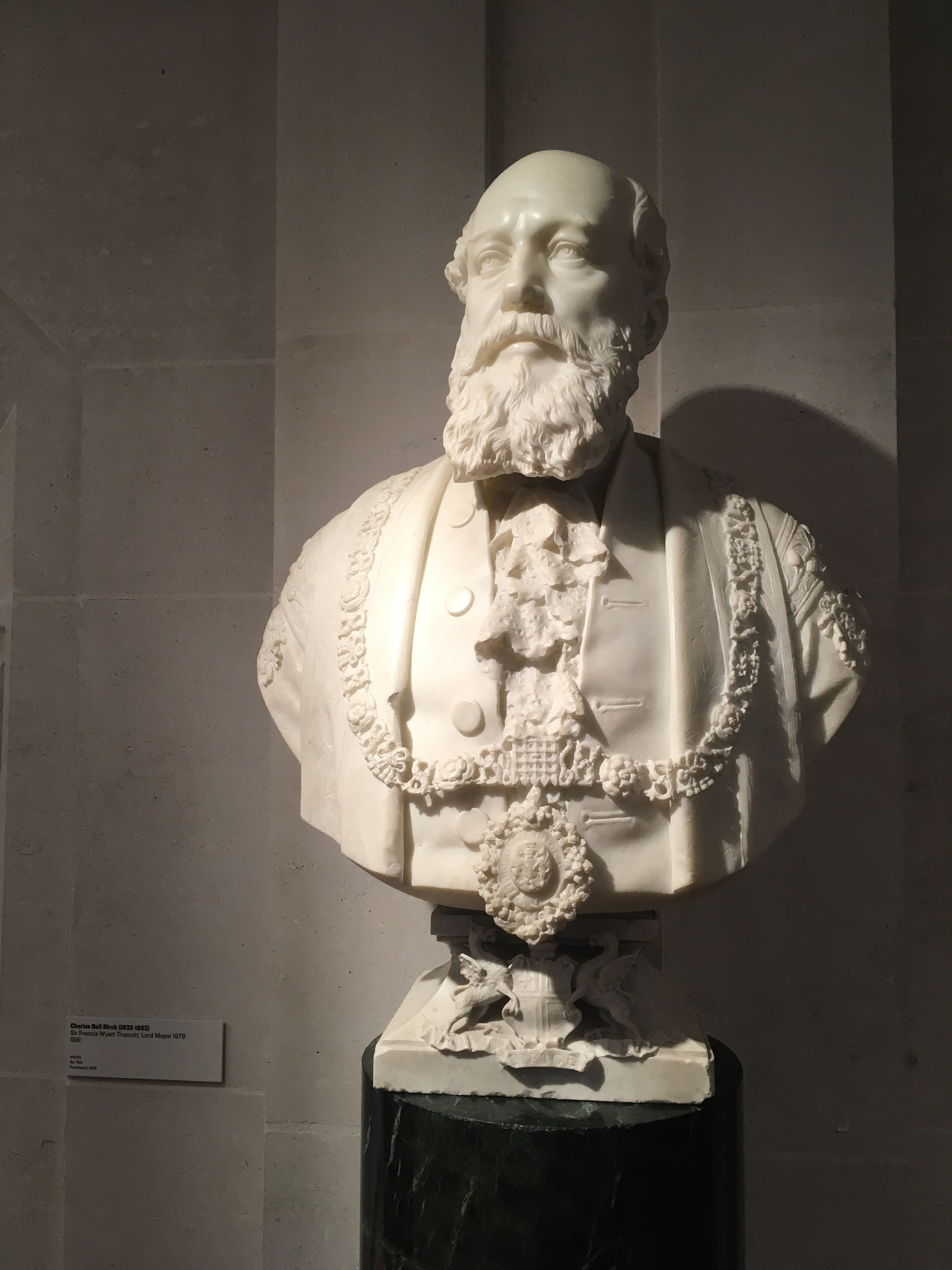
An 1881 bust of Truscott by Charles Bell Birch at the Guildhall Art Gallery in the City of London.

Sir Francis Wyatt Truscott (24 November 1824 – 3 March 1895) was an English businessman and Lord Mayor of London in 1879–80, a member of the Worshipful Company of Stationers. He was the father of George Wyatt Truscott, the Lord Mayor of London for 1908–09.

== Family ==
Truscott was born in Truro, Cornwall in 1824 to James Truscott and educated at King's College London. In 1847 he married Eliza Freeman. They had two sons and one daughter,

1. George Wyatt (1857–1941), 1st Baronet
2. a son
3. Louisa Edith, married Homewood Crawford, later Sir Homewood, City Solicitor.

His residences included an estate at East Grinstead, West Sussex; Essex Lodge, Upper Norwood; and Victoria Street, London.

== Career ==
Truscott was a wholesale stationer and head of the firm, Messrs James Truscott and Sons, of Suffolk Lane, London. He was elected a member of the Court of Common Council for the Dowgate Ward in 1858 and was Sheriff of London and Middlesex in 1871. Truscott was an unsuccessful Conservative candidate for the Dudley ward in 1865. A keen freemason, he was Grand Bard of England. Wyatt was appointed Worshipful Master of No. 1 Grand Masters Lodge at the resumption of his mayoralty. In November 1880, the Temple Bar Memorial, also known as Truscott's Folly, was unveiled at Temple Bar by the Duke of Albany. The dragon atop the memorial is often misdescribed as a griffin. He was also the first President of the London Society of Artists.

He was appointed a Knight Bachelor. In 1883 he was elected Master of the Worshipful Company of Haberdashers.

Truscott died on 3 March 1895 aged 70 and is buried in Norwood cemetery

Civic offices
| Preceded by Sir Charles Whetham | Lord Mayor of London; 1879–1880 | Succeeded by William McArthur |
