= Truscott baronets =

Baronetcy in the Baronetage of the United Kingdom

The Truscott baronetcy, of Oakleigh in East Grinstead in the County of Sussex, is a title in the Baronetage of the United Kingdom. It was created on 16 July 1909 for Sir George Truscott.

He was Chairman of Brown, Knight & Truscott, Ltd, printers and stationers, and served as Lord Mayor of London from 1908 to 1909. Truscott was the son of Sir Francis Wyatt Truscott, Lord Mayor of London from 1879 to 1880.

As of 2026 the baronetcy is marked dormant on the Official Roll.

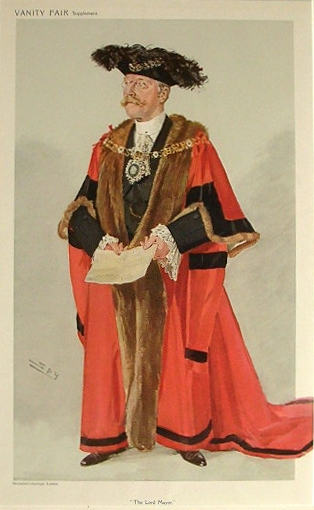
Vanity Fair caricature of Sir George Wyatt Truscott, 1st Baronet

== Truscott Baronets, of Oakleigh (1909) ==
- Sir George Wyatt Truscott, 1st Baronet (1857–1941)
- Sir Eric Homewood Stanham Truscott, 2nd Baronet (1898–1973)
- Sir George James Irving Truscott, 3rd Baronet (1929–2001)
- Sir Ralph Eric Nicholson Truscott, 4th Baronet (born 1966)

There is no heir to the title.

Coat of arms of Truscott baronets
Crest A fasces erect surmounted by a palm branch slipped and an arrow saltirewise all Proper. Escutcheon Argent three chevronels Gules between two mullets in chief of the last pierced of the field and a knight’s helmet in base Proper a chief check of the second and first. Motto Gwir Yn Erbyn Y Byd (Truth Against All The World); In Utrumque Paratus

Baronetage of the United Kingdom
Preceded by Duckworth baronets	Truscott baronets of Oakleigh; 16 July 1909	Succeeded by Scarisbrick baronets
