= 1991 Special Honours =

British government recognitions

As part of the British honours system, Special Honours are issued at the Monarch's pleasure at any given time. The Special Honours refer to the awards made within royal prerogative, operational honours and other honours awarded outside the New Years Honours and Birthday Honours.

== Life Peer ==
=== Baronesses ===
- Jean Denton, CBE, Deputy Chairman, Black Country Development Corporation. Vice President of the National Organisation for Women's Management Education.
- Sally Rachel Hanwee, Councillor, London Borough of Richmond-upon-Thames. Chair, London Planning Advisory Committee. Partner, Clintons, Solicitors.
- Jennifer Hilton, QPM, Former Commander Metropolitan Police.
- Ann Mallalieu, QC, A Recorder.
- Detta O'Cathain, OBE, managing director, Barbican Centre. Former managing director, Milk Marketing, Milk Marketing Board. Non executive Director of Tesco plc, Midland Bank plc and Sears plc.

=== Barons ===
- Sir Nicolas Henry Christopher Browne-Wilkinson.
- Marshal of the Royal Air Force Sir David Craig, GCB, OBE, lately Chief of the Defence Staff.
- Professor Meghnad Jagdishchandra Desai, Professor of Economics, London School of Economics.
- Clive Richard Hollick, Managing Director, MAI plc. Trustee Institute for Public Policy Research.
- Frank Ashcroft Judd, Member of the Executive Committee of International Council of Voluntary Agencies. Director of Oxfam.
- Sir Norman Somerville MacFarlane.
- John Jackson Mackay, Chairman, Sea Fish Industry Authority. Former Chief Executive, Scottish Conservative Central Office. Former Member of Parliament for Argyll 1979-83 and for Argylle and Bute 1983–87.
- Professor Andrew Colin Renfrew, Disney Professor of Archaeology, University of Cambridge. Master of Jesus College, Cambridge.
- Mark Shuldham Schreiber. Farmer and former Member of the Conservative Research Department and Special Adviser to the Government. Editorial Consultant to the Economist. Member of the Countryside Commission and the Rural Development Commission.

== Order of Merit (OM) ==
- Dame Joan Sutherland, AC, DBE
- Professor Francis Harry Compton Crick, FRS

== Knight Bachelor ==
Knight's Bachelor ribbon

- The Right Hon. (Mr Justice) Sir Gordon (Ellis) Bisson.
- The Honourable Mr Justice (John Christopher Calthorpe) Blofeld.
- The Honourable Mr Justice (John Murray) Chadwick, ED
- The Honourable Mr Justice (Peter John) Cresswell.
- The Honourable Mr Justice (Michael Bryan) Connell.
- The Hon. Sir Roger (Owen) Douglas.
- Sir David (Russell) Hay, CBE
- The Honourable Mr Justice (Anthony Kenneth Tristram) May.
- The Honourable Mr Justice (Jonathan Frederic) Parker.

== Order of the Bath ==
=== Companion of the Order of the Bath (CB) ===
Military Division

- Commodore Christopher John Sinclair Craig, DSC, Royal Navy.
- Rear Admiral Roy Thomas Newman, Royal Navy.
- Major General John Oswald Claud Alexander, OBE (445775), late Royal Corps of Signals.
- Major General John Paul Foley, OBE, MC (460829), late The Royal Green Jackets.
- Brigadier Christopher John Anthony Hammerbeck, (478067), late Royal Tank Regiment.
- Major General Alexander George Hamilton Harley, OBE (471272), late Royal Regiment of Artillery.
- Air Vice-Marshal John Hulme Harris, CBE, Royal Air Force.
- Air Vice-Marshal Richard Edward Johns, CBE, LVO, Royal Air Force.
- Air Commodore (Acting Air Vice-Marshal) Ian David Macfadyen, OBE, Royal Air Force.

Civil Division

- Nicolas Bevan, Grade 3, Ministry of Defence.
- David Rowlands, Grade 3, Department of Transport.
- Julian Guy Hudsmith Walker, Grade 3, Ministry of Defence.

== Order of Saint Michael and Saint George ==
=== Knight Grand Cross of the Order of Saint Michael and Saint George (GCMG) ===
- The Most Honourable Howard Felix Hanlan Cooke, ON, CD
- Wiwa Korowi, Governor-General of Papua New Guinea.

=== Knight Commander of the Order of Saint Michael and Saint George (KCMG) ===
- Harold Berners Walker, CMG, lately HM Ambassador, Baghdad.
- Michael Charles Swift Weston, CVO, HM Ambassador, Kuwait.

=== Companion of the Order of Saint Michael and Saint George (CMG) ===
- John Albert Noel Brehony, Foreign and Commonwealth Office.
- Christopher James Alured Denne, Foreign and Commonwealth Office.
- Derek John Plumbly, Deputy Head of Mission, HM Embassy, Riyadh.
- John Robertson Young, lately Foreign and Commonwealth Office.

== Royal Victorian Chain ==
- The Right Reverend and Right Honourable Robert Alexander Kennedy, Baron Runcie, MC, lately Archbishop of Canterbury.

== Royal Victorian Order ==
=== Knight Grand Cross of the Royal Victorian Order (GCVO) ===
- Sir Antony (Arthur) Acland, GCMG, KCVO
- The Right Honourable David Anthony Thomas, Earl of Westmorland, KCVO

=== Knight Commander of the Royal Victorian Order (KCVO) ===
- The Very Reverend Professor Robert Alexander Stewart Barbour MC
- Major General Simon Christie Cooper.
- Roger Blaise Ramsay Hervey, CMG
- The Right Reverend and Right Honourable Graham Douglas Leonard.
- Walter Kieran Prendergast, CMG
- John Edward Powis Titman, CVO

=== Commander of the Royal Victorian Order (CVO) ===
- John Donald Garner, CMG, LVO
- Michael Edward Head.
- Mrs Anne Mary Neal, LVO
- Richard Peter Ralph.
- Francis Neville Richards.
- Brigadier Clive Robertson.
- Carlton Scott.
- Nigel James Thorpe.

=== Lieutenant of the Royal Victorian Order (LVO) ===
- Rupert Grenside Bowen.
- Roger Stephen Graver Clarke.
- Sherard Louis Cowper-Coles.
- Philip William Grice.
- David Arthur Cyril Hallett, MBE
- Frederick Pett.
- Michael Anthony Price.
- Colonel David Christopher Lester Rowe, OBE

=== Member of the Royal Victorian Order (MVO) ===
- Stephen John Collier, RVM
- Miss Anne Elizabeth Conroy.
- Mrs Albertha Estick.
- Michael Holmes.
- Philip Treleven.
- Miss Christine Anne Wilson.

=== Royal Victorian Medal ===
==== Silver ====
- Warrant Officer Harry Noel Bevan, MBE, Royal Air Force.
- Terence Moran.
- John Shand.

== Most Excellent Order of the British Empire ==
Ribbon bar of the Order of the British Empire (Military)

Ribbon bar of the Order of the British Empire (Civil)

=== Knight Grand Cross of the Order of the British Empire (GBE) ===
- Air Chief Marshal Sir Patrick Hine, GCB, Royal Air Force.
- Alderman Brian Garton Jenkins, Lord Mayor Elect of London.

=== Knight Commander of the Order of the British Empire (KBE) ===
- Rear Admiral David Allen, CBE
- General Sir Peter De La Billiere, KCB, CBE, DSO, MC (424859), late The Light Infantry.
- Air Marshal Sir Kenneth Hayr, KCB, CBE, AFC*, Royal Air Force.
- Air Vice Marshal William John Wratten, CB, CBE, AFC, Royal Air Force.

=== Commander of the Order of the British Empire (CBE) ===
Military Division

- Captain Jonathon Alexander Burch, Royal Navy.
- Captain Paul Charles Beeching Canter, Royal Navy.
- Captain John Barrie Dickinson, OBE, Royal Fleet Auxiliary.
- Captain Iain Robert Henderson, Royal Navy.
- Commodore Malcolm Graham Rutherford, Royal Navy.
- Lieutenant Colonel Douglas Vernon Erskine Crum, (489519) The Parachute Regiment.
- Colonel Martyn Frederick Ian Cubitt, MBE (475129), late Royal Corps of Transport.
- Colonel Arthur George Herbert Curtis (459238), late The Royal Regiment of Fusiliers.
- Colonel William George Dickson. OBE (489435). late The Ulster Defence Regiment.
- Brigadier Ian Geoffrey Campbell Durie, OBE (476500), late Royal Regiment of Artillery.
- Colonel Graham Anderson Ewer, MBE (479220), late Royal Corps of Transport.
- Brigadier Simon David Anson Firth, OBE (461422), late The Gloucestershire Regiment.
- Brigadier (Acting Major General) Michael Stuart Heath (469016), late Corps of Royal Electrical and Mechanical Engineers.
- Brigadier Richard Harrison Taylor Kirby (480120), late Royal Army Ordnance Corps.
- Colonel Robert Norwood Lennox, OBE (475679), late Royal Army Ordnance Corps.
- Colonel Ian Scott Mercer (477800), late Corps of Royal Engineers.
- Brigadier James William Parker, OBE (481838) Late The Light Infantry.
- Colonel John George Reith, OBE (488478), late The Parachute Regiment.
- Brigadier Charles David Maciver Ritchie, OBE (470138) Late The Royal Scots (The Royal Regiment).
- Colonel William Edward Shackell (471348), late Corps of Royal Engineers.
- Colonel Martin Stratton, OBE (471360) Late The Parachute Regiment.
- Colonel David Strudley, OBE (485840), late 9th/l2th Royal Lancers (Prince of Wales's).
- Brigadier Timothy John Sulivan (481881), late The Blues and Royals (Royal Horse Guards and 1st Dragoons).
- Colonel Peter Julian Wagstaffe, OBE (479376), late Royal Regiment of Artillery.
- Brigadier Michael John Dawson Walker, OBE (481887), late The Royal Anglian Regiment.
- Colonel (Acting Brigadier) Martin Spencer White (476668), late Royal Corps of Transport.
- Group Captain Peter Henry Boatwright, Royal Air Force.
- Group Captain Alan George Bridges, MBE, Royal Air Force.
- Group Captain Ronald David Elder, Royal Air Force.
- Group Captain John Vernon Harding, Royal Air Force.
- Air Commodore John Geoffrey Hargreaves, Royal Air Force.
- Group Captain Reginald William Henry Hedges, Royal Air Force.
- Group Captain (Acting Air Commodore) David Frank Andrew Henderson, OBE, Royal Air Force.
- Air Commodore Norman John Grosvenor Hodnett, MBE, Royal Air Force.
- Group Captain Simon Woodland Hunt, Royal Air Force.
- Air Commodore Trevor Nattrass, AFC*, Royal Air Force.
- Group Captain David Miller Niven, OBE, Royal Air Force.

Civil Division

- Miss Patricia Margaret Aldred, Grade 5, Ministry of Defence.
- Gerald Boxall, chairman and Chief Executive, Vickers Defence Systems.
- Hugh Bernard Colver, Grade 4, Ministry of Defence.
- Stephen Edwin Gibbs, Deputy Chief Scientific Officer, Ministry of Defence.
- Richard Paul Hatfield, Grade 5, Ministry of Defence.
- Alan Christopher Hugh Mace, Deputy Chief Scientific Officer, Ministry of Defence.
- Reginald John Powell, Deputy Chief Scientific Officer, Ministry of Defence.
- John (Cody Fidler) Simpson, Foreign Affairs Editor, British Broadcasting Corporation.
- Simon Webb, Grade 5, Ministry of Defence.

Diplomatic and Overseas List

- Donald McClen, AFC, Chief Executive, British Aerospace, Saudi Arabia.

=== Officer of the Order of the British Empire (OBE) ===
Military Division
Royal Navy

- Commander Roger Thomas Crouch, Royal Navy.
- Surgeon Commander Elliott Paxton Dewar, Royal Navy.
- Commander Timothy John Eltringham, Royal Navy.
- Commander Stephen William Graham, Royal Navy.
- Commander Jeremy Peter Spencer Green, Royal Navy.
- Commander Alistair Neil Law, Royal Navy.
- Captain David Edward William Lench, Royal Fleet Auxiliary.
- Commander Trevor Walter Ling, MBE, Royal Navy.
- Commander Christopher Gerald Massie-Taylor, Royal Navy.
- Commander Christopher Sylvester McHugh, Royal Navy.
- Surgeon Commander (D) Geoffrey William Myers, Royal Navy.
- Commander Adrian Ralph Nance, Royal Navy.
- Captain Stuart Gordon Pearce, Royal Fleet Auxiliary.
- Commander Jonathan Charles Scoles, Royal Navy.
- Captain Brian Paul Tarr, Royal Fleet Auxiliary.
- Commander David Raymond Teer, Royal Navy.

Army

- Lieutenant Colonel Meryon Grenville le Gifford Bridges (480253), Corps of Royal Engineers.
- Lieutenant Colonel Lawrence Simon Burr (490915), Royal Army Ordnance Corps.
- Lieutenant Colonel Steen Karl Eric Clarke (492692), Corps of Royal Engineers.
- Lieutenant Colonel Rory Rodney Hugh Clayton, MBE (491423), Royal Regiment of Artillery.
- Lieutenant Colonel Walker Patrick Conn, (471230) The Parachute Regiment.
- Lieutenant Colonel Mark Alexander Corbet Burcher (489511), Royal Regiment of Artillery.
- Lieutenant Colonel Vincent Gerard Cowley (473561), Army Catering Corps.
- Lieutenant Colonel Paul Anthony Davis (488416). The Royal Hampshire Regiment.
- Lieutenant Colonel Arthur George Denaro (485713), The Queen's Royal Irish Hussars.
- Lieutenant Colonel Hamish Murray Fletcher, (490207) The Parachute Regiment.
- Major (Acting Lieutenant Colonel) John Charles Webb Gillman (486650), 15th/19th The King's Royal Hussars.
- Lieutenant Colonel Charles Stewart Grant, MBE (485732), Queen's Own Highlanders (Seaforth and Camerons).
- Lieutenant Colonel Gavin John Haig (488273), Royal Corps of Transport.
- Lieutenant Colonel Ritson Indolph Harrison (487273), Royal Corps of Transport.
- Lieutenant Colonel Clinton Francis Hicks, (491471) The Parachute Regiment.
- Lieutenant Colonel David Malcolm Howell, MBE (500438), Army Legal Corps.
- Lieutenant Colonel Richard Glyn Jones (482323), Royal Army Educational Corps.
- Lieutenant Colonel Janis Kazocins, Royal Regiment of Artillery.
- Lieutenant Colonel Hugh Desmond Heber Keatinge (461459), The Royal Hampshire Regiment.
- Lieutenant Colonel James Gordon Kerr, QGM (490901) Intelligence Corps.
- Lieutenant Colonel John Edward Francis Kirby (488457), Royal Corps of Signals.
- Lieutenant Colonel Richard John Lees, MC (484896), The Worcestershire and Sherwood Foresters Regiment (29th/45th Foot).
- Major William Euan Buchanan Loudoun (499743), The Royal Highland Fusiliers (Princess Margaret's Own Glasgow and Ayrshire Regiment).
- Lieutenant Colonel (Acting Colonel) Bruce Alexander McCandlish (474909), Corps of Royal Engineers.
- Lieutenant Colonel John David Moore-Bick (487977), Corps of Royal Engineers.
- Lieutenant Colonel Christopher George Anthony Nash (487046), Corps of Royal Engineers.
- Lieutenant Colonel Nigel John Lindley Osborne (469070), Corps of Royal Electrical and Mechanical Engineers.
- Lieutenant Colonel Robert Pridham (490548), Corps of Royal Engineers.
- Lieutenant Colonel David Edward Radcliffe (483542), Royal Regiment of Artillery.
- Lieutenant Colonel Charles Thomas Rogers (489592), The Staffordshire Regiment (The Prince of Wales's).
- Lieutenant Colonel John Francis Brooks Sharples (486739), The Royal Scots Dragoon Guards (Carabiniers and Greys).
- Lieutenant Colonel Nicholas Stuart Southward (489213), 13th/18th Royal Hussars (Queen Mary's Own).
- Lieutenant Colonel Michael Howard Turner (474313), Royal Army Ordnance Corps.
- Lieutenant Colonel Kelvin Michael Tutt (487595), Royal Corps of Transport.
- Lieutenant Colonel Michael Jon Howorth Vickery (485850), 14th/20th King's Hussars.
- Lieutenant Colonel Ian Michael Donald Linton Weston, (476667) The Blues and Royals (Royal Horse Guards and 1st Dragoons)
- Lieutenant Colonel Peter Brownlow Williams, Royal Regiment of Artillery.

Royal Air Force

- Squadron Leader Robert Ian Allan (5202357), Royal Air Force.
- Wing Commander David Richard Benson (4335499), Royal Air Force.
- Wing Commander Michael John Bibby (4220260), Royal Air Force.
- Wing Commander Julian Anthony Broderick (4335534), Royal Air Force.
- Wing Commander John Edgar Chandler (0608943), Royal Air Force.
- Wing Commander Jonathan Paul Chitty (8021184), Royal Air Force.
- Wing Commander John Adrian Cosgrove (4232688), Royal Air Force.
- Wing Commander Alexander McBride Davis (2619781), Royal Air Force.
- Wing Commander (now Group Captain) Michael Leonard Feenan (2616065), Royal Air Force.
- Wing Commander Brian Gerrard Freeman (802S701), Royal Air Force.
- Wing Commander Anthony Gerard Hayes (0684969), Royal Air Force.
- Wing Commander Alan Thomas Hudson (2621249), Royal Air Force.
- Wing Commander David Kenneth Lodge McDonnell (4232031), Royal Air Force.
- Wing Commander Richard Thomas William Mighall (0608110), Royal Air Force.
- Wing Commander Andrew Davison Moir (5200932), Royal Air Force.
- Wing Commander Christopher John Morris (0608978), Royal Air Force.
- Wing Commander Derek Nequest (4232553), Royal Air Force.
- Wing Commander Allan Jefferson Ovens (5201384), Royal Air Force.
- Wing Commander John Pottage (3152498), Royal Air Force.
- Wing Commander David John Powell (0608348), Royal Air Force
- Wing Commander Ian Reilly (0608491), Royal Air Force.
- Squadron Leader Michael George Richardson (0690441), Royal Air Force.
- Wing Commander Michael Andrew Rogers (5201699), Royal Air Force.
- Wing Commander Michael Roland Trace (2615373), Royal Air Force.
- Wing Commander Denys Charles Williams (0608720), Royal Air Force.

Civil Division

- Norman John Steel Abbot, Grade 7, Ministry of Defence.
- Geoffrey Frank Allbutt, Grade 7, Ministry of Defence.
- Peter William Baker, Director, Perkins Defence Systems, Peterborough.
- Anthony O'Brien ffrench Blake, First Secretary, Foreign and Commonwealth Office.
- Timothy Gawin Bradley, First Secretary, Foreign and Commonwealth Office.
- Michael John Cheeseman, Senior Principal, Foreign and Commonwealth Office.
- Graham John Cooper, Senior Principal Scientific Officer, Ministry of Defence.
- Lieutenant Colonel Philip Charles Edwin Creasy, General Secretary, The Royal British Legion.
- Eugene Gerard Curley, First Secretary, Foreign and Commonwealth Office.
- Alan Martin Dixon, Grade 6, Ministry of Defence.
- Bryan Andrew Easey, assistant director, Ministry of Defence.
- Stewart Graham Eldon, First Secretary, Foreign and Commonwealth Office.
- Major Leslie John Gatehouse (Ret'd), General Manager, Zengrange Ltd., Leeds.
- Robert Antony Hayward, MP For services to the Gulf Support Group.
- Stuart Raymond Jackson, Grade 6, Ministry of Defence.
- Squadron Leader Colin Frederick Jones, RAF (Ret'd), managing director, F.R. Aviation Ltd.
- Peter Claud Jukes, Grade 6, Ministry of Defence.
- John Desmond Patrick Keegan, Newspaper Correspondent, The Daily Telegraph.
- Margot Suzanne, Mrs Kirk, Grade 7, Ministry of Defence.
- John Barry Lawson, Grade 7, Ministry of Defence.
- Michael St John Markin, Senior Principal Scientific Officer, Ministry of Defence.
- Geoffrey Marks, Grade 6, Ministry of Defence.
- Michael Nicholson, Television News Correspondent, Independent Television News Ltd.
- Thomas James Packard, Principal Scientific Officer, Ministry of Defence.
- Dennis George Peach, Principal Scientific Officer, Ministry of Defence.
- Simon Richard Reece, managing director, Pearson Engineering, Newcastle upon Tyne.
- Hugh David Richardson, Principal Scientific Officer, Ministry of Defence.
- Barry Charles Short, Principal Scientific Officer, Ministry of Defence.
- John Arthur Thomas Slade, General Manager, Product Support, Vickers Defence Systems, Vickers plc.
- Barrie Edwin Sparham, managing director, Reynolds Boughton (Devon) Ltd.
- Richard Anthony Sykes, Grade 6, Ministry of Defence.
- John Warwick Tindle, Senior Principal Scientific Officer, Ministry of Defence.
- Brian Cecil Trueman MBE, Programme Manager, Challenger 2, Vickers Defence Systems, Vickers plc.
- Klaus Norbert Tusch, managing director, Colebrand Ltd.
- Derek Thomas Donald Williams, Joint Managing Director, Pall Europe Ltd.
- John Robert Williams, Divisional Commander ' E ' Division, Ministry of Defence Police.
- Christopher John Yeo, Director, Flight Operations, British Aerospace (Military Aircraft) Ltd., Warton.

Diplomatic and Overseas List

- Larry Banks, First Secretary and Consul, HM Embassy, Kuwait.
- Ian Cameron Cliff, First Secretary, UK Mission to the UN, New York.
- Alexander Ian Saxon Macmillan, British Community, Kuwait.
- Derek Ronald Watts, British Community, Iraq.
- William Anthony Wilson, British Community, Iraq.

=== Member of the Order of the British Empire (MBE) ===
Military Division

- Warrant Officer Richard John Bentley.
- Lieutenant Colin Brazendale, Royal Navy.
- Lieutenant Commander Allan William Bucknell, Royal Navy.
- Lieutenant Commander Martin William Butcher, Royal Navy.
- Warrant Officer Robert Leslie Clifford.
- Lieutenant Commander Michael Patrick John Croome-Carroll, Royal Navy.
- Acting Commander John Hamilton Eldridge, Royal Navy.
- Lieutenant Keith William Goldie, Royal Navy.
- Lieutenant Commander David William Holmes, Royal Navy.
- Lieutenant Commander Roger Charles Ireland, Royal Navy.
- Warrant Officer Robert Edward Lee.
- Lieutenant Commander Brian James Mansbridge, Royal Navy.
- Lieutenant Commander Kenneth Maclean Napier, Royal Navy.
- Lieutenant Commander Leslie Alan Port, Royal Navy.
- Lieutenant Commander Ian Charles Angus Stobie, Royal Navy.
- Major Peter John Angus (497358), Royal Regiment of Artillery.
- Major Brian Aarmitage (504116), Royal Regiment of Artillery.
- Major David Richard Arthur (484813), Royal Regiment of Artillery.
- Major Lawrence Ashbridge (515458), The Parachute Regiment.
- Major Alexander Guy Bain (495131), The Royal Regiment of Fusiliers.
- WO458934 Warrant Officer Class 2 Susan Elizabeth Ball, Women's Royal Army Corps, (now Lieutenant (537590) Royal Army Educational Corps).
- Major Christopher Baker, (497364) Intelligence Corps.
- Major Nigel Ashton Banks (497365), Royal Army Ordnance Corps.
- Major Michael John Brack, (499110) Royal Corps of Transport.
- 24175775 Warrant Officer Class 1 Peter Raymond Bromley, Royal Corps of Transport.
- Major Robert Brotheridge (504893), Corps of Royal Electrical and Mechanical Engineers.
- Major David Robin Burns (500341), Corps of Royal Engineers.
- The Reverend Roger Malcolm Burt (523192), Chaplain to the Forces 4th Class, Royal Army Chaplain's Department.
- Major Ewan Elythe Carmichael (510595), Royal Army Dental Corps.
- Captain Jonathan Mark Chapman (520610), The Light Infantry.
- Major Roger Francis Chater (506794), Small Arms School Corps.
- Major Douglas Lewis Connon (491427), The Gordon Highlanders.
- Major Geoffrey Corani (485700), Royal Corps of Transport.
- Major Christopher John Cromack (221671), Corps of Royal Australian Electrical and Mechanical Engineers.
- Major John Frederick Crompton (490204), Corps of Royal Engineers.
- 24112886 Warrant Officer Class 1 (now Lieutenant) Clifford Davey, Royal Corps of Signals.
- Major Peter Matthew Davies (505040), Corps of Royal Engineers.>
- 24327597 Warrant Officer Class 2 James Patrick Dempsey, Royal Corps of Signals.
- Major Christopher Julian Down (498677), Royal Regiment of Artillery.
- Major Nigel Charles Welton Dunkley (503094), The Royal Scots Dragoon Guards (Carabiniers and Greys).
- Captain Brian Frederick Jerome Eadon (518457), Royal Army Medical Corps.
- Major Colin Michael Eastland (509417), Royal Corps of Signals.
- Major John Paul Edmondson-Jones (504257), Royal Army Medical Corps.
- Major Robert James Edmondson-Jones,(503802) The Royal Anglian Regiment.
- 24269198 W arrant Officer Class 2 Robert Neal Edwards, Intelligence Corps.
- Major William David Fawkner-Corbett (495166), Corps of Royal Engineers.
- 24307855 Warrant Officer Class 2 Michael Arnold Fishwick, Corps of Royal Electrical and Mechanical Engineers.
- Major Grahame Henry Peter Flood (503179), The Queen's Lancashire Regiment.
- Major Adrian John Foster (507180), Royal Regiment of Artillery.
- 24383649 Warrant Officer Class 2 (Acting Warrant Officer Class 1) Jack Norman Gardener, Royal Army Medical Corps.
- Captain Geoffrey Peter Herbert Gillion, (519592) Intelligence Corps.
- Captain Christopher Stanley Goddard (522077), Corps of Royal Engineers.
- Lieutenant David Fredrick Gordon, (535016) Ulster Defence Regiment.
- Major Charles Frederick Grieve (490512), The Duke of Wellington's Regiment (West Riding).
- Major George Bede Grossmith (498165), Corps of Royal Engineers.
- Major Richard Leon Maunsell Hackett (499710), The. Worcestershire and Sherwood Foresters Regiment.
- Major Richard Lewis Hall (504459), The Gloucestershire Regiment.
- 24217609 Warrant Officer Class 1 Stephen Hammond, Corps of Royal Electrical and Mechanical Engineers.
- Major Wayne Richard Harber (507197), The Queen's Regiment.
- Major Nigel Paul Harrison (506772), Royal Corps of Signals.
- Major Christopher John Harvey (505265), Royal Corps of Transport.
- Captain Glenn Harwood (530432), Royal Corps of Signals.
- Captain Michelle Heap (530223), Royal Army Medical Corps.
- Major Trevor James Hendren (483528), Royal Corps of Signals.
- Major John Maxwell Heron (499717), Corps of Royal Engineers.
- Major (Acting Lieutenant Colonel) Carl Arthur Hewitt (496309), Royal Army Ordnance Corps.
- Major Richard Charles Hood (470085), Royal Corps of Signals.
- Major Ian Michael Hurley (503842), Royal Corps of Transport.
- Major Robert Forbes Ingram (498094), Corps of Royal Engineers.
- Major Julian Guy James (498962), The Parachute Regiment.
- Captain Ronald Alexander Wynn James (525191), Army Air Corps.
- Major Leonard Alexander Jeffery (501851), Royal Corps of Signals.
- Major John Francis Kenwright (509854), Royal Army Ordnance Corps.
- Captain (Queen's Gurkha officer) Krishnabahadur Gurung (525964), Gurkha Transport Regiment.
- Major Charles Graham Lambert (499989), The Queen's Regiment.
- Major Christopher James Lewis (496317), Corps of Royal Electrical and Mechanical Engineers.
- Captain Howell Vaughan Lewis (516009), Royal Corps of Transport.
- Major Jonathan George Ormsby Lowe (503127), Royal Corps of Transport.
- Major Angus Alan Scott Macdonald (509542), The Black Watch (Royal Highland Regiment).
- Major Matthew Gregory Macdonald (10841603), Royal Canadian Dragoons.
- Major Manikumar Rai (498933), 6th Queen Elizabeth's Own Gurkha Rifles.
- 23898462 Warrant Officer Class 1 John Simon Manning, Corps of Royal Engineers.
- 24288354 Warrant Officer Class 1 William George McDonald, BEM, Royal Army Ordnance Corps.
- Lieutenant (Acting Captain) Anne McNabney (502119), The Ulster Defence Regiment.
- Major Robert Adam Mungo Simpson Melville (499747), Corps of Royal Engineers.
- Captain Matthew Middlemiss, (510038) Irish Guards.
- 24277950 Warrant Officer Class 2 Alexander Middleton, Royal Corps of Signals.
- Captain Peter Stephen Melbourne (524452), Corps of Royal Electrical and Mechanical Engineers.
- Captain (Acting Major) Dale Millar (509554), Corps of Royal Electrical and Mechanical Engineers.
- 24277329 Warrant Officer Class 1 Ronald William Moffett, Royal Army Ordnance Corps.
- Major Frederick Geoffrey Moss, (497475) The Staffordshire Regiment (The Prince of Wales's).
- 24318284 Warrant Officer Class 2 David Moyles, Intelligence Corps.
- 24062257 Warrant Officer Class 1 Timothy Michael Murphy, Royal Army Ordnance Corps
- Captain (Acting Major) Miles Standish Olive (521140), Royal Corps of Signals.
- Major Adrian Percy Orr (476600), Royal Regiment of Artillery.
- 24119323 Warrant Officer Class 2 Peter Alan Parker, Royal Army Ordnance Corps.
- Captain (Acting Major) Nicholas Charles Pedley (507065) Intelligence Corps.
- Major Michael Perry (517499), Corps of Royal Engineers.
- Captain Ralph James Phillips (522585), Army Air Corps.
- Lieutenant Acting Captain Graham Pierce (531264), The Royal Scots Dragoon Guards (Carabiniers and Greys).
- The Revered Alun Huw Price (503205), Chaplain to the Forces 3rd Class, Royal Army Chaplain's Department.
- Major Roy Pugh (504967), Intelligence Corps.
- 24126086 Warrant Officer Class 2 Clifford Walter Randall, Corps of Royal Electrical and Mechanical Engineers.
- Major Bernard Riley (517780), Royal Army Medical Corps (Territorial Army).
- W0439499 Warrant Officer Class 1 Carol Ann Maxwell Rowat, Women's Royal Army Corps.
- Major John David Kennedy Russell (498543) The Queen's Regiment.
- Captain Christopher David Ryan (526907), Royal Army Ordnance Corps.
- Captain Christopher Sanderson (500396), Intelligence Corps.
- Captain John William Thomas Shephard, (525121) Ulster Defence Regiment.
- Major Richard John Steed (499773), Royal Corps of Signals.
- Captain (now Major) Ian Alexander Robert Stenning (511909), Corps of Royal Military Police.
- Captain James Ian Shannan Stevenson (512688), The Royal Scots (The Royal Regiment).
- Major Richard David Stocks (516828), Royal Corps of Transport.
- 24414102 Warrant Officer Class 2 Richard Thomas Stott, Royal Regiment of Artillery.
- Captain (now Major) William Alexander Stronge (515654), The Ulster Defence Regiment.
- Major Stephen John Tetlow, (512516) Corps of Royal Electrical and Mechanical Engineers.
- Major Andrew Edward Topp (495591), Corps of Royal Electrical and Mechanical Engineers.
- 24286733 Warrant Officer Class 2 Kevin Alan Townsend, Royal Corps of Signals.
- 24272554 Warrant Officer Class 2 Robert Whiteoak, Intelligence Corps.
- Captain Ronald Andrew Whiteside (531270), The Royal Scots Dragoon Guards (Carabiniers and Greys).
- Captain Kenneth Nigel Whittaker (506042), Royal Army Ordnance Corps.
- Major David Neill Wright (495266), Royal Corps of Transport.
- Squadron Leader Robert Maxwell Adams (2622400), Royal Air Force.
- Flying Officer Nicholas Frank Atkinson (8029239), Royal Air Force.
- Squadron Leader (now Wing Commander) Nigel Alexander Bairsto (8021178), Royal Air Force.
- Flight Lieutenant David Charles Balaam (8092619), Royal Air Force.
- Squadron Leader Andrew Christie Barker (5203358), Royal Air Force.
- Squadron Leader Michael Ernest Beer (4231811), Royal Air Force.
- Squadron Leader Donald Sydney Belmore (5204819), Royal Air Force.
- Flight Lieutenant Christopher Louis Boyce (8023740), Royal Air Force.
- Flight Lieutenant Malcolm Derrick Bridges (0595422), Royal Air Force.
- Squadron Leader Terence Allan Brignall (8114169), Royal Air Force.
- Flight Lieutenant Roy Alan Bulley (4265168), Royal Air Force.
- Flight Lieutenant Charles Godfrey Bulman (8099620), Royal Air Force.
- Squadron Leader Christopher Clive Chacksfield (06082638), Royal Air Force.
- Squadron Leader Robert Alan Cherry (0684525), Royal Air Force.
- Squadron Leader Graham George Cooke (0688110), Royal Air Force.
- Squadron Leader Peter John Daybell (5201073), Royal Air Force.
- Squadron Leader David Foden (4257484), Royal Air Force.
- Squadron Leader Nigel Jeffrey Furniss (4335426), Royal Air Force.
- Flying Officer Jonathan Christopher Gould (8024280), Royal Air Force.
- Squadron Leader Andrew Wesley Gransden (8019483), Royal Air Force.
- Warrant Officer Michael Bernard Harber (F4270861), Royal Air Force.
- Squadron Leader Philip John Heard (5203122), Royal Air Force.
- Squadron Leader Leslie John Taylor Hendry (8023062), Royal Air Force.
- Squadron Leader Christopher John Sinclair Hewat (4291899), Royal Air Force.
- Squadron Leader Christopher Thomas Lawrence (2624924), Royal Air Force.
- Flight Lieutenant John Peter Loader (8023200), Royal Air Force.
- Squadron Leader Dean Richard Mason (5204589), Royal Air Force.
- Flight Lieutenant Charles Nicholas Brendan Morgan (8026516), Royal Air Force.
- Squadron Leader Michael Norton Musselwhite (0690515), Royal Air Force.
- Squadron Leader John Henry Sharpe (1939948), Royal Air Force.
- Warrant Officer Herbert Travis Sutherland BEM (B0684321), Royal Air Force.
- Warrant Officer Hugh Leonard Richard Thurlow (W5069597), Royal Air Force.
- Squadron Leader Robert George Torrens (5203152), Royal Air Force.
- Squadron Leader John David Tyler (8025316), Royal Air Force.
- Squadron Leader Vincent John Williams (5201179), Royal Air Force.
- Squadron Leader David Geoffrey Wilson (8020842), Royal Air Force.
- Squadron Leader Ian Paul Woodhouse (5203574), Royal Air Force.
- Warrant Officer Patrick Grant McKay, (P84239), Royal New Zealand Air Force.

Civil Division

- Michael John Angwin, Senior Professional and Technology Officer, Ministry of Defence.
- Edward Charles Baker, Senior Professional and Technology Officer, Ministry of Defence.
- Antony Barry, Senior Executive Officer, Ministry of Defence.
- Robert Bartlett, Project ExecutiveAlarm, British Aerospace (Dynamics) Ltd.
- Nigel Douglas Bateson, Cameraman, British Broadcasting Corporation.
- Nicholas James Bennett, Senior Executive Officer, Ministry of Defence.
- David John Millward Birch, Project Manager, SD- Scicon UK Ltd.
- Stephen Brookes. For services to the Gulf Support Group.
- Edward James Murch Brown, Third Secretary, Foreign and Commonwealth Office.
- Mary Jane, Mrs Burt, Higher Executive Officer, Ministry of Defence.
- Eugene Campbell, Cameraman, Independent Television News Ltd.
- Hugh Arthur Chesney, Higher Executive Officer, Ministry of Defence.
- Peter Keith Coleman, lately Computer Consultant, Foreign and Commonwealth Office.
- Anthony Richard Colver, Executive Officer, Cabinet Office.
- Miss Joanna Marie Cecilia Copley. For services to the Gulf Support Group.
- Joyce Elizabeth, Mrs Dalton, County Secretary, Tyne and Wear Branch, Soldiers', Sailors' and Airmen's Families Association.
- Kelly Patricia, Mrs Dundavan. For services to Service Families of The Prince of Wales's Division.
- Major William Edward Eagles, Retired Officer Grade 2, Ministry of Defence.
- Peter Leslie Etherton, Higher Professional and Technology Officer, Ministry of Defence.
- Terry Raymond Fisher, Senior Scientific Officer, Ministry of Defence.
- Dennis Frederick Searle Fryer, Senior Professional and Technology Officer, Ministry of Defence.
- Nicholas Frank John Gibbons, Senior Executive Officer, Cabinet Office.
- Patrick Allen Gilbert, Professional and Technology Officer, Property Services Agency.
- Richard Gore, Operations Manager, Racal Survey Group, Abu Dhabi.
- Paul Victor Harris, Service Manager, GKN Defence.
- Miss Dorothy Lee Hewitt, Third Secretary, Foreign and Commonwealth Office.
- Jarvis Charles Humby, Senior Executive Officer, Ministry of Defence.
- John Graham Jenkins, Higher Professional and Technology Officer, Ministry of Defence.
- Alan John Kenneth Johnson, Senior Professional and Technology Officer, Ministry of Defence.
- Peter Herbert Warwick Jones, Senior Mapping and Charting Officer, Ministry of Defence.
- Maxime Dewhirst Lamchbury, Senior Scientific Officer, Ministry of Defence.
- Alan Frederick Lee, Communications Officer, Foreign and Commonwealth Office.
- Nicholas Charles Anthony Latham Lutwyche, Higher Professional and Technology Officer, Ministry of Defence.
- Ian McIntosh, Assistant Manager, Technical Ammunition Division, Royal Ordnance pic.
- Mildred, Mrs Molineaux, Executive Officer, Ministry of Defence.
- David Graham Murphy, Manufacturing Manager, David Brown Vehicle Transmissions Ltd.
- Susan Erica, Mrs Oldnall. For services to Service Families of the 7th Armoured Workshop, Royal Electrical and Mechanical Engineers.
- Bryan Parker, Project Manager, Post Design Services, Vickers Defence Systems.
- Colin Parr, Senior Professional and Technology Officer, Ministry of Defence.
- Michael Harry Preston, Sales Manager, Westland Dynamics Ltd.
- Jennifer Mary, Mrs Robson, Senior Scientific Officer, Ministry of Defence.
- Charles Hambleton Saffery, Project Manager RGID-2, Graseby Ionics Ltd.
- Miss Ailie Marguerite Saunders, Senior Research Officer, Ministry of Defence.
- Ronald Edwin Shadick, Higher Professional and Technology Officer, Ministry of Defence.
- Maurice Bernard Smith, Engineering Services Manager, In-Service Support, RWR, Marconi Defence Systems Ltd.
- David Leonard Albert Tarrant, Higher Mapping and Charting Officer, Ministry of Defence.
- Timothy Michael Thomas, Manager, Electro-optics Pods, Navigation Systems Division, GEC-Ferranti Defence Systems Ltd.
- Michael Laurence Tomlins, Professional and Technology Officer, Ministry of Defence.
- Ronald Frederick Walker, Military Sales Manager, All Wheel Drive Ltd.
- Jacqueline Anne Mrs Wawn. For services to Service Families of the 4th Regiment Army Air Corps.
- Gerald Martin Whiteing, Senior Scientific Officer, Ministry of Defence.
- Peter Frank Whiten, Second Secretary, Foreign and Commonwealth Office.
- Martin Clive Wickham, Product Design Manager, Vehicle and Turrets Division, Alvis Ltd.
- Colin Richard Winter, First Secretary, Foreign and Commonwealth Office.
- Brian Thomas Worsfold, Senior Scientific Officer, Ministry of Defence.
- Peter George Wythe, Senior Executive Officer, Ministry of Defence.

Diplomatic and Overseas List

- Christopher Bell, British Community, Kuwait.
- Dr Gary Roland John Burns, British Community, Kuwait.
- Barry Aubrey Cooper, British Community, Iraq.
- Miss Caroline Janice Cross, lately Management Officer and Consul, HM Embassy, Baghdad.
- Michael William Devey, British Community, Kuwait.
- Dr Stuart Campbell Dick, British Community, Kuwait.
- Miles Nicholas Fewster, Registry Officer HM Embassy, Riyadh.
- Michael Ward Graham, British Community, Kuwait.
- Richard Edgar Hattersley, British Community, Kuwait.
- John Donal Kidney, lately Communications Officer, Dhahran.
- John Martin Levins AM, British Community, Kuwait.
- Donald Alistair Robert Macaulay, lately First Secretary (Commercial), HM Embassy Kuwait.
- Alan John McCready, British Community, Iraq.
- Brian McKeith, Security Officer, HM Embassy, Kuwait.
- Dr Michael John McMurtry, British Community, Kuwait.
- Frederick John Mitchell, Communications Officer, HM Embassy, Riyadh.
- Jacqueline Ann, Mrs Morley, lately Personal Secretary, Foreign and Commonwealth Office.
- William John Murphy, Security Officer, HM Embassy, Amman.
- Lawrence Oates, British Community, Saudi Arabia.
- John Stuart Osborne, lately Communications Officer, HM Embassy, Baghdad.
- Bruce Alastair Peter Parry, British Community, Kuwait.
- Timothy Steward, Security Officer, HM Embassy, Amman.
- Roy William Topping, Seamans Welfare Representative, Bahrain.
- David Clive Whitticombe, British Community, Iraq.
- Ralph John Williams, British Community, Kuwait.

== Distinguished Service Order (DSO) ==
- Wing Commander John Anthony Broadbent (8025333), Royal Air Force.
- Brigadier Patrick Anthony John Cordingley (479196), Late 5th Royal Inniskilling Dragoon Guards.
- Major General Rupert Anthony Smith, OBE, QGM (477836), Late The Parachute Regiment.
- Wing Commander Glenn Lester Torpy (5203033), Royal Air Force.
- Wing Commander Ian Travers Smith (4232959), Royal Air Force.
- Wing Commander Jeremy John Witts (8020843), Royal Air Force.

== Polar Medal ==
- Peter Frank Barker, Geophysicist, British Antarctic Survey.
- William Stanley Lawrence Woolley, B.Sc., Expedition Leader, East Greenland Expeditions.

== Imperial Service Order (ISO) ==
- Robert Quinlan Allan, Painter, Property Services Agency.
- George William Anslow, Plant Attendant, Property Services Agency.
- Reginald Edward Ayres, Craft Auxiliary B, Property Services Agency.
- Michael Leonard Ball, Foreman M. & E, Property Services Agency.
- Samuel James Bedlow, Fitter, Property Services Agency.
- Mrs Jean Beryl Blunt, Administrative Officer, Property Services Agency.
- Waldron John Bond, Carpenter, Property Services Agency.
- Henry Joseph Braney, Chargehand, Property Services Agency.
- Jack Bridle, Labourer, Property Services Agency.
- John Philip Bryant, Carpenter/Joiner, Property Services Agency.
- Kenneth Joseph Burt, Painter, Property Services Agency.
- William John Carbis, Crane Driver, Property Services Agency.
- Douglas John Cave, Foreman M. & E, Property Services Agency.
- James Edmund Clark, Postman, Aldershot, General Post Office.
- Peter Raymond Collins, Foreman B. & CE, Property Services Agency.
- James Reuben Cox, Electrician, Property Services Agency.
- Dennis Albert Dark, Foreman B. & CE, Property Services Agency.
- Mark Kennedy Davidson, Chargehand M. &E, Property Services Agency.
- Jeffrey Arthur Gabriel Dungey, Officer London, South Regional Office, Department of Social Security.
- Robert Homer Durand, Chargehand Painter, Property Services Agency.
- Stanley Dyball, Fitter M. & E, Property Services Agency.
- Douglas Robert Elliott, Plumber, Property Services Agency.
- Desmond Roy Evans, Craft Auxiliary B, Property Services Agency.
- John Charles Evason, Craft Auxiliary Worker A, Property Services Agency.
- Mrs Gladys Winifred Fortune, Administrative Assistant Adelphi, Department of Social Security.
- Alan Keith Galley, Foreman B. & CE, Property Services Agency.
- Mrs Irene Geleman, Administrative Assistant, Newcastle, Department of Social Security.
- Graham George, Foreman M. & E, Property Services Agency.
- Leslie Percy Hale, Carpenter/Joiner, Property Services Agency.
- Brian Hall, EPO II, Property Services Agency.
- Raymond William Charles Hardy, Plant Attendant, Property Services Agency.
- Arthur Godfrey Harry, Electrician, Property Services Agency.
- Alexander Hendry, Foreman, Property Services Agency.
- Gordon Edward Hewlett, Plumber, Property Services Agency.
- Arthur Dennis Hirst, Electrician, Property Services Agency.
- William Hogg, Fitter Mechanical, Property Services Agency.
- John Douglas Jacobs, Electrician, Property Services Agency.
- Peter Thomas Jefferies, Foreman M. & E, Property Services Agency.
- Henry Ratcliffe Forbes Jeffery, Stoker C, Property Services Agency.
- Gordon Philip George Lee, Groundsman II, Property Services Agency.
- Colin Henry Loveday, Craft Auxiliary Worker A, Property Services Agency.
- Dudley Norman Lowe, Fitter, Property Services Agency.
- Peter John Lydiard, Craft Auxiliary Worker B, Property Services Agency.
- Mrs Joan McGuinness, Administrative Officer, Newcastle, Department of Social Security.
- Gilbert Buchan McHardy, Foreman M. & E, Property Services Agency.
- Duncan William McLellan, Carpenter/Joiner, Property Services Agency.
- Joseph McPherson, Plasterer, Property Services Agency.
- Leonard Spencer Major, Divers Attendant, Property Services Agency.
- Frederick Masters, Craft Auxiliary Worker A, Property Services Agency.
- Mrs Patricia Meister, Typist, HM Treasury.
- Michael William Ernest Morris, Foreman B. & CE, Property Services Agency.
- Henry Mowbray, Foreman, Property Services Agency.
- Robert Lawrence Nunns, Foreman M. & E, Property Services Agency.
- Barry John O'Farrell, Auxiliary Electrical Worker A, Property Services Agency.
- John Percival Perry, Plumber, Property Services Agency.
- Harry James Plummer, Craft Auxiliary Worker B, Property Services Agency.
- Horace Frank Rainbow, Electrician, Property Services Agency.
- John Kenneth Robbins, Foreman M. & E, Property Services Agency.
- Cyril Arthur Rye, Foreman M. & E, Property Services Agency.
- Dennis William Joseph Short, Foreman, Property Services Agency.
- Edward William Charles Skeates, Plumber, Property Services Agency.
- Frederick George Smale, Painter, Property Services Agency.
- Henry John Smith, Foreman B. & CE, Property Services Agency.
- George Sommerville, Painter, Property Services Agency.
- John Joseph Sutherland, Swimming Pool Attendant, Property Services Agency.
- Derek Claude Taney, Foreman B. & CE, Property Services Agency.
- Mrs Barbara May Thomas, Personal Secretary, Department of Employment.
- Reginald John Tucker, Radio Officer, Government Communications Headquarters.
- Ernest Richmond Turk, Auxiliary Electrical Worker B, Property Services Agency.
- Valentine Rex Upward, Plant Attendant, Property Services Agency.
- Alfred Edward Whytock, Labourer, Property Services Agency.

== Imperial Service Medal (ISM) ==
- John George Abel, Foreman Electrician, Property Services Agency.
- Hayden Barry Acreman, Professional Technology Officer C, Ministry of Defence.
- Alan John Adams, Instructional Officer Grade I, Ministry of Defence.
- Derek George Adams, Telecoms Engineering Technician, Home Office.
- Raymond Frederick Adams, Experimental Worker II, Ministry of Defence.
- Ronald Adams, Welder, Ministry of Defence.
- William Adamson, Officer, HM Prison Frankland, Home Office.
- Norman Ivor Addison, Electrician, Property Services Agency.
- William Watson Aitchison, Engineer, Ministry of Defence.
- Mrs Iris May Akass, Administrative Officer, Ministry of Defence.
- Frank Cottingham Alderson, Foreman/Plumber, Property Services Agency.
- George Clarkson Alderson, Administrative Officer, Ministry of Defence.
- Cyril John Allan, Painter, Ministry of Defence.
- Mrs Elizabeth Janette Allard, Administrative Officer, Ministry of Defence.
- John Allcock, Electrician, Property Services Agency.
- Manuel Alsina, Foreman M & E, Property Services Agency.
- Ronald George Ames, Carpenter/Joiner, Property Services Agency.
- James Anderson, General Hand, Ministry of Defence.
- Hugh Alistair Andrew, Crane Driver, Ministry of Defence.
- William Andrews, Local Officer II, Hyde ILO, Department of Social Security.
- Peter Edward Angel, Foreman B & CE, Property Services Agency.
- William Arkinstall, Electrical Examiner, Ministry of Defence.
- John Clifford Armitage, Auxiliary Electrical Worker B, Property Services Agency.
- George Armstrong, Leading Hand Joiner, Ministry of Defence.
- Michael Angus Armstrong, Wood Machinist, Ministry of Defence.
- John Arnell, Prison Officer, Home Office.
- Roy Arthur, Leading Hand Mason, Property Services Agency.
- Gerald Ashley, General Fitter, Ministry of Defence.
- Thomas Atack, Administrative Office, Department of Trade and Industry.
- Eric Atkinson, Administrative Officer, Department of Employment.
- Peter Terrence Smith Attrill, Fitter Turner, Ministry of Defence.
- Maurice Audus, Motor Transport Driver, Ministry of Defence.
- Joan Eileen Austin, Administrative Officer, Ministry of Defence.
- Peter George Austin, Stores Officer Grade D, Ministry of Defence.
- Alan Thomas Avis, Higher Instructional Officer, Ministry of Defence.
- Leonard Reginald Avis, Sawmillman, Ministry of Defence.
- Albert Reginald Ayre, Auxiliary Officer, HM Prison, Wakefield, Home Office.
- David Ayres, Stores Officer Grade C, Ministry of Defence.
- Mrs June Bablak, General Fitter, Ministry of Defence.
- Peter Frederick Back, Shipwright, Ministry of Defence.
- James Henry Maxwell Bacon, Instructional Officer, Ministry of Defence.
- David John Badmin, Electrical Fitter, Ministry of Defence.
- David James Bailey, Shipwright, Ministry of Defence.
- Robert Frederick Baird, Vehicle Fitter Leading Chargehand, Ministry of Defence.
- Harry Melville Baker, Boatswain in Command, Ministry of Defence.
- John Baker, Pest Control Operator, Ministry of Defence.
- George Edward Baldock, Labourer, Ministry of Defence.
- Derick Henry Baldwin, Motor Transport Driver Chargehand, Ministry of Defence.
- Brian Vivian Bance, Shipwright, Ministry of Defence.
- James Band, Principal Clerk Officer, Scottish Office.
- Owen Band, Senior Officer, Scottish Office.
- Frank William Banks, Motor Transport Driver, Ministry of Defence.
- Gerald Robert Dudley Baragwanath, Founder, Ministry of Defence.
- Mrs Ivy June Barber, Typist, Ministry of Defence.
- Roy Victor Barker, Process and General Supervisory Grade 'E', Ministry of Defence.
- Johnston Barnes, Administrative Officer, Ministry of Defence.
- William Joseph Barrett, London Postal Region, General Post Office.
- William Henry Barlett, Foreman M & E, Property Services Agency.
- Peter John Barros, Fitter, Ministry of Defence.
- William Hayton Bateman, Bricklayer CE, Property Services Agency.
- Mrs Margaret Jean Bates, Administrative Officer, Ministry of Defence.
- Peter Battle, Craftsman, Ministry of Defence.
- John Frederick Bazley, Qualified Assistant Painter, Ministry of Defence.
- David William Raymond Beal, Craftsman, Ministry of Defence.
- Frank Bean, Plumber, Property Services Agency.
- William Beattie, Motor Transport Driver, Ministry of Defence.
- James Eric Sydney Beddows, Senior Storekeeper, Ministry of Defence.
- Ivan Leonard Beer, Skilled Labourer, Ministry of Defence.
- Winston Michael Andrew Beer, Shipwright, Ministry of Defence.
- Michael Joe Beirne, Auxiliary Electrical Worker, Property Services Agency.
- James Henry Belchamber, Craft Auxiliary Worker B, Property Services Agency.
- Ian Belcher, Equipment Examiner, Ministry of Defence.
- Joseph Bell, Wiring Duties (Superior), Ministry of Defence.
- Neville James Benbow, Vehicle Fitter, Ministry of Defence.
- Walter Raymond Benjamin, Instructional Officer Grade I, Ministry of Defence.
- Alfred Bennett, Assistant Painter, Ministry of Defence.
- Brian Bennett, Foreman M & E, Property Services Agency.
- Colin Bertram Bennett, Welder, Ministry of Defence.
- Ronald Albert Bennett, Trades Officer, Home Office.
- Stanley John Bennett, Motor Transport Driver, Ministry of Defence.
- Derek Thomas Bentham, Radio Officer, Government Communications Headquarters.
- Eric Gordon Berry, Machine Operator, Ministry of Defence.
- Mrs Pamela Rose Bettles, Steward II, Ministry of Defence.
- Ivor Bevan, Machinist, Ministry of Defence.
- Ronald Burton Bevan, Telecommunications Technical Officer III, Government Communications Headquarters.
- Charles Robert Bezer, Carpenter, Ministry of Defence.
- Michael Joseph Charles Bing, Fitter Turner, Ministry of Defence.
- Mrs Barbara Mary Bird, Typist, Ministry of Defence.
- David John Bird, Professional Technology Officer C, Ministry of Defence.
- Frederick James Bird, Storeman A, Property Services Agency.
- John Charles Birdsall, Vehicle Fitter, Ministry of Defence.
- Geoffrey William Bishop, Support Grade Bank 1, Ministry of Defence.
- Mrs Pamela Joan Bishop, Typist, Ministry of Defence.
- Roger William Bishop, Shipwright, Ministry of Defence.
- David Tinning Black, Administrative Officer, Ministry of Defence.
- Michael Charles Blackaller, Coppersmith, Ministry of Defence.
- Ronald William Blackmore, Wireman, Ministry of Defence.
- John Phillip Blackmore, Stores Officer Grade D, Ministry of Defence.
- David Charles Blake, Fitter Turner, Ministry of Defence.
- Graham Ernest Blake, Plumber, Property Services Agency.
- William David Blake, Shipwright, Ministry of Defence.
- Ronald Thomas Blatchford, Chargehand B & CE, Property Services Agency.
- William Thomas Blatchford, Fitter Turner, Ministry of Defence.
- Kenneth Harry Bloxham, Foreman, B and CE, Property Services Agency.
- Michael Ernest Blythpark, Boilermaker, Ministry of Defence.
- Miss Nada Bodden, Postmistress, Little Cayman, Cayman Islands.
- Reginald Robert Bolton, Skilled Labourer, Ministry of Defence.
- Roger John Bond, Painter, Ministry of Defence.
- Keith Gregory Boobyer, Mapping and Charting Technical Grade I, Ministry of Defence.
- Harold William Booker, Process and General Supervisory C, Ministry of Defence.
- William Richard Bools, Shipwright, Ministry of Defence.
- George Edward Boorman, Painter, Property Services Agency.
- Edward Henry Botley, Instructional Officer Grade I, Ministry of Defence.
- Beverley William Incledon Boulden, Professional and Technology Officer, Ministry of Defence.
- Ivor Raymond Bowden, Joiner, Ministry of Defence.
- John Derek Bowden, Shipwright, Ministry of Defence.
- Horace Eric Boyce, Skilled Labourer, Ministry of Defence.
- Geoffrey George Boyd, Electrician, Property Services Agency.
- Miss Violet Margaret Boyd, Administrative Assistant, Ministry of Defence.
- Albert Alfred Thomas Brace, Craft Auxiliary Worker B, Property Services Agency.
- John Victor Brace, Plumber, Property Services Agency.
- Mrs June Bradbury, Typist. Supervisory C, Ministry of Defence.
- Peter Bradshaw, Auxiliary Electrical Worker B, Property Services Agency.
- Sydney Jeffrey Brain, Process and General Supervisory Grade 'E', Ministry of Defence.
- Mrs Irene Mary Brand, Administrative Officer, Ministry of Defence.
- Mrs Pauline Mary Bray, Personal Secretary, Ministry of Defence.
- Leslie Arthur Brazier, Craft Auxiliary Worker A, Property Services Agency.
- Anthony John Brealey, Senior Officer, HM Prison Winchester, Home Office.
- Donald Edward Raymond Breeze, Administrative Officer, Ministry of Defence.
- Harry James Breeze, Fitter Turner, Ministry of Defence.
- Mrs Isobel Bremner, Local Officer II, Department of Social Security.
- James Brennan, Administrative Officer, Contributions Agency, Department of Social Security.
- Sean Patrick Brennan, Leading Slinger, Ministry of Defence.
- Geoffrey Owen Brewer, Progressman Planner Technical, Ministry of Defence.
- Mrs Barbara Maureen Bright, Administrative Officer, Ministry of Defence.
- George Walter John Britt, Painter, Property Services Agency.
- Jack Brittain, Principal Officer, HM Prison Swansea, Home Office.
- Leslie Brown, Professional and Technology Officer, Ministry of Defence.
- Edwin James Frederick Brooks, Crane Driver, Ministry of Defence.
- Mrs Florence Hilda Brooks, Storekeeper, Ministry of Defence.
- Mrs Ann Campbell Ross McGregor Broom, Local OfficerII, Glasgow (Partick), ILO, Department of Social Security.
- Colin James Broome, Process and General Supervisory Grade C, Ministry of Defence.
- Mrs Dorothy Eileen Agnes Broome, Supervisor, Ministry of Defence.
- Mrs Doreen Brown, Support Grade Band I, Ministry of Defence.
- Evelyn Thomas Brown, Electrical Fitter, Ministry of Defence.
- John Frank Brown, Support Manager II Telephonist, Ministry of Defence.
- John Leslie Brown, Sailmaker, Ministry of Defence.
- Joseph Brown, Foreman, Property Services Agency.
- Leonard Brown, Chargehand Fitter, Ministry of Defence.
- Paul Herbert Brown, Professional and Technology Officer, Ministry of Defence.
- Raymond Thomas Brown, Auxiliary Electrical Worker A, Property Services Agency.
- Roy Evill Brown, Process and General Supervisory Grade 'E', Ministry of Defence.
- Mrs Vera Maud Elsie Brown, Administrative Officer, Ministry of Defence.
- Derek Arthur Brushwood, Messenger, Ministry of Defence.
- Harold Keith Bryant, Senior Storeman, Property Services Agency.
- Raymond Alfred Bryant, Skilled Labourer, Ministry of Defence.
- James Bryce, Warehouseman Group IV, Her Majesty's Stationery Office.
- John William Buchan, Senior Officer (Instructor), Scottish Office.
- Peter William Buckby, Radio Officer, Government Communications Headquarters.
- Cecil Buckle, Chargehand Fitter, Ministry of Defence.
- Miss Joyce Buckley, Administrative Officer, Ministry of Defence.
- Andrew Henry Bull, Lagger, Property Services Agency.
- Gordon John Basil Bull, Lift Fitters Assistant, Property Services Agency.
- Roy Arthur Burchell, M T Fitter/Foreman, Property Services Agency.
- Lawrence David Burden, Craft Auxiliary Worker B, Property Services Agency.
- William Henry Charles Burden, CIO III HM Prison The Verne, Home Office.
- Dennis William Burford, Chargehand, Property Services Agency.
- Gerald Dennis Burge, Wireless Mechanic, HOWD Shapwick, Home Office.
- Frank Burns, Fitter/Electrician, Property Services Agency.
- John Leslie Burton, Professional Technology Officer M, Ministry of Defence.
- Roger Charles Burton, Professional Technology Officer M, Ministry of Defence.
- Trevor Burton, Prison Officer, HM Prison, Rudgate, Home Office.
- Gordon Neyin Bush, M T Driver, Property Services Agency.
- Leonard Charles Butcher, Senior Officer, HM Prison Blundeston, Home Office.
- Nicholas Butland, Professional and Technology Officer, Ministry of Defence.
- David Kenneth Bye, Administrative Officer, Ministry of Defence.
- Robert John Alfred Bye, Professional and Technology Officer, Ministry of Defence.
- Henry Byers, Radio Officer, Ministry of Defence.
- Anthony Joseph Byrne, Officer (Dog Handler), HM Prison Wormwood Scrubs, Home Office.
- James Cailes, Process and General Supervisory Grade D, Ministry of Defence.
- Joseph Austin Cairns, Patrolman, Ministry of Defence.
- Peter William Calder, Welder, Property Services Agency.
- Francis Caldwell, Chargehand, Property Services Agency.
- Donald Edgar Callard, Plumber, Property Services Agency.
- George Callaway, Officer, HM Prison Ford, Home Office.
- William Cameron, Progressor, Ministry of Defence.
- Edith Elizabeth Campbell, Administrative Officer, Ministry of Defence.
- James Allan Hunter Campbell, Principal Hospital Officer, HM Prison Wandsworth, Home Office.
- Norman Campbell, MT Driver, Property Services Agency.
- Clifford Cann, Officer, HM Prison, Preston, Home Office.
- Robert Henry Cann, Professional and Technology Officer, Ministry of Defence.
- Colin Walter John Caplin, Stores Assistant, Ordnance Survey.
- Ian Beverley Carlyle, Storekeeper, Ministry of Defence.
- Mrs Nora Carlyle, Administrative Assistant, Ministry of Defence.
- John Robert Carr, Officer, Home Office.
- Miss Jean Elizabeth Carter, Administrative Officer, Department of Transport.
- Victor George Carter, Smiths Fitter, Property Services Agency.
- James Carthew, Lift Fitters Assistant, Property Services Agency.
- Dennis Alfred Casswell, Publications Supervisor, Her Majesty's Stationery Office.
- Alec Caton, Officer HM Prison Leeds, Home Office.
- Geoffrey Hanson Cauvain, Loco Driver, States of Guernsey.
- Dennis Chapman, Painter, Property Services Agency.
- Georgios Charlambous, Chargehand, Property Services Agency.
- Richard Leonard Charles, Electrical Fitter, Ministry of Defence.
- Eric Alfred Cheese, Plumber, Property Services Agency.
- James Cheetham, Welder, Ministry of Defence.
- Arthur Fortunate Rosario Cherett, Smith, Ministry of Defence.
- Mrs Iris Vera Cheriton, Administrative Officer, Ministry of Defence.
- Brian Cherry, Stoker C, Property Services Agency.
- Ivan Thomas George Cheshire, Driver, Steventon Supply & Transport Store, Home Office.
- Miss June Catherine Chesters, Personal Secretary, Ministry of Defence.
- Roger John Childerhouse, Driller, Ministry of Defence.
- David John Chinn, Foreman B & CE, Property Services Agency.
- Percy Raymond Christmas, Chargehand Fitter, Property Services Agency.
- Michael Lanham Christy, Progressor, Ministry of Defence.
- Graham Churchill, Auxiliary Worker B, Property Services Agency.
- Michael Churchill, Messenger, Ministry of Defence.
- John Nicholas Cicirko, Telecommunications Engineer Technician, HOWD Stanton, Home Office.
- Kenneth Hanover Clark, C/H Joiner B & CE, Property Services Agency.
- Victor Edward Clark, Support Grade Band I (Telephonist), Ministry of Defence.
- David Clarke, Storekeeper, Ministry of Defence.
- Miss Edwina Clarke, Typist, Ministry of Defence.
- Brian Clarkson, Officer TA Electrician HM Prison Shepton Mallet, Home Office.
- Ernest Victor Clarkson, Local Officer II, Goole ILO, NERO, Department of Social Security.
- Derek Cleave, Skilled Labourer, Ministry of Defence.
- Gerald Ivor Cleave, Carpenter/Joiner, Property Services Agency.
- Thomas Charles William Coates, Gardener Groundsman, Property Services Agency.
- Reginald John Francis Cocking, Mess Hand, Ministry of Defence.
- Robert Gregory Cocks, Fitter Turner, Ministry of Defence.
- John Lynn Codd, Fitter, Ministry of Defence.
- Miss Sheila Edna Cofield, Administrative Officer, Ministry of Defence.
- Norman Victor Colbourne, Foreman, Property Services Agency.
- Kenneth Charles Henry Cole, Postman, London Postal Region, General Post Office.
- Alan Leslie Collins, Professional Technology Officer L, Ministry of Defence.
- David Edward Collins, Professional and Technology Officer M, Ministry of Defence.
- Mrs Eileen Rosina Collins, Administrative Officer, Ministry of Defence.
- Mrs Joan Elizabeth Collins, Local Officer II, Department of Social Security.
- Robert Frederick Collins, Hose Attendant, Ministry of Defence.
- Thomas Roy Compton, Airframe Engine Fitter, Ministry of Defence.
- Charles Penman Connor, Senior Officer, HM Prison Durham, Home Office.
- Cyril Conroy, Craftsman/Inspector, Ministry of Defence.
- Mrs Shiela Constable, Administrative Office, Department of Social Security.
- James Conway, Officer, HM Prison Pentonville, Home Office.
- Geoffrey Samuel Cook, Mechanical Fitter, Property Services Agency.
- Herbert Cook, Foreman/Grounds Maintenance, Property Services Agency.
- Jack Cooper, Officer, HM Prison Norwich, Home Office.
- Kenneth Harwood Cook, Electrical Fitter, Ministry of Defence.
- William John Cook, Fitter Turner, Ministry of Defence.
- Robert Bernard Coombs, Radio Officer, Government Communications Headquarters.
- Harold Maurice Cooper, Chargehand, Property Services Agency.
- Peter Robert James Cooper, Professional and Technology Officer, Ministry of Defence.
- Stanley Lewis Cooper, Instructional Officer Grade II, Ministry of Defence.
- Brian George Coopey, Carpenter, Ministry of Defence.
- Clifford Copley, Hospital Officer HM Young Offender Institution Wetherby, Home Office.
- Francis George Copp, Instructional Officer, Ministry of Defence.
- Lawrence Arthur Coppock, Lift Fitter, Property Services Agency.
- Michael George Cornish, Leading Seaman, Ministry of Defence.
- Peter Edward Cory, Process and General Supervisory Grade C, Ministry of Defence.
- Harry Philip Couling, Professional and Technology Officer, Ministry of Defence.
- John Edward Court, Professional and Technology Officer, Ministry of Defence.
- Mrs Christine Cowan, Administrative Officer, Ministry of Defence.
- John Coxon, Battery Charging Hand, Ministry of Defence.
- Jack Reginald Cracknell, Sheetmetal Worker, Ministry of Defence.
- James Robert Crannis, Warehouseman Group IV, Her Majesty's Stationery Office.
- Alan Craven, Carpenter/Joiner, Property Services Agency.
- Gerald Edward Creber, Professional and Technology Officer C, Ministry of Defence.
- Frederick Brian Cresswell, Officer, HM Prison Durham, Home Office.
- Frederick Charles Cripps, Craft Auxiliary Worker 'B ', Property Services Agency.
- Brian George Crocker, Professional and Technology Officer L, Ministry of Defence.
- Paul Leon Crocker, Plumber, Ministry of Defence.
- Alan James Crowder, Test Driver 'A', Ministry of Defence.
- Miss Betty Rosemary Crump, Typist, Department of Trade and Industry
- Mrs Margaret Joan Cundick, Administrative Officer, Ministry of Defence.
- Miss Elaine Hilary Curtis, Typist, Ministry of Defence.
- Terence Arthur Curtis, Professional and Technology Officer, Ministry of Defence.
- Roy Edward Dance, Professional and Technology Officer, Ministry of Defence.
- Charles Joseph Darker, Radio Officer, Government Communications Headquarters.
- Maurice Thomas Dart, Professional and Technology Officer, Ministry of Defence.
- William Alfred John Dart, Professional and Technology Officer, Ministry of Defence.
- Peter Alan Davenport, Shipwright, Ministry of Defence.
- Alfred John Davey, Machinist, Ministry of Defence.
- Brian Edward Davey, Professional and Technology Officer, Ministry of Defence.
- Ernest George Davey, Non-Technical Progressman, Ministry of Defence.
- Samuel Jack Davey, French Polisher, Property Services Agency.
- Anthony John Davidson, Professional and Technology Officer, Ministry of Defence.
- Harry Knott Davidson, Storekeeping Assistant II, Ministry of Defence.
- Mrs Pauline Davidson, Storekeeping Assistant II, Ministry of Defence.
- David James Davies, Senior Storekeeper, Ministry of Defence.
- Ivor Cecil Davies, Professional and Technology Officer, Ministry of Defence.
- Philip Davies, Steward I, Ministry of Defence.
- Derek Mervyn Davis, Shipwright, Ministry of Defence.
- Graham Bruce Davis, Station Radio Officer, Government Communications Headquarters.
- James William Dawe, Painter, Ministry of Defence.
- Trevor Dawson, Administrative Officer, Ministry of Defence.
- Mrs Mary Ann Deacon, Administrative Assistant, Department of Trade and Industry.
- John McKenzie Deans, Officer, Home Office.
- John Louis Dearden, Professional and Technology Officer, Ministry of Defence.
- Kenneth Alan Dedman, Administrative Officer Lunar House, Home Office.
- Charles Dellipani, Administrative Assistant, Ministry of Defence.
- Gordon Demellweek, Professional and Technology Officer, Ministry of Defence.
- Thomas Kenneth Demuth, Craftsmans Mate (Special), Ministry of Defence.
- Mrs Iris Annie Dennett, Administrative Officer, Ministry of Defence.
- Mrs Eva Mary Dennis, Administrative Officer, Ministry of Defence.
- John Brian Dennis, Machine Minder, Her Majesty's Stationery Office.
- Charles De Santos, Administrative Officer, Ministry of Defence.
- Richard Charles Dewe, Craft Auxiliary B, Ministry of Defence.
- Harold Dexter, Senior Officer, HM Prison Liverpool, Home Office.
- Kasturi Lai Dhawan, Electrician, Property Services Agency.
- George Alan Dillon, Fitter Leading Chargehand, Ministry of Defence.
- James Gerald Dines, Fitter Turner, Ministry of Defence.
- Anthony John Dingle, Professional and Technology Officer, Ministry of Defence.
- Francis John Disney, Discipline Officer HM Prison Shepton Mallet, Home Office.
- John Ditchburn, Professional and Technology Officer, Ministry of Defence.
- Mrs Doris Gwendoline Dixon, Senior Storekeeper, Ministry of Defence.
- Ronald David Dixon, Radio Officer, Ministry of Defence.
- Thomas Dixon, Chargehand Fitter, Ministry of Defence.
- Terence Joseph Doherty, M T Driver, Property Services Agency.
- John Michael Dolan, Support Grade Band I, Ministry of Defence.
- Maurice Raymond Dominy, Progressor, Ministry of Defence.
- Albert Harry Dommett, Engineering Plant Operator Grade II, Property Services Agency.
- Roger Euegene Doney, Professional and Technology Officer, Ministry of Defence.
- William Donnelly, Ptinipal Officer, Dungavel, Scottish Office.
- William Francis Donnelly, Foreman M & E, Property Services Agency.
- Joseph Doran, Titular Insulator, Ministry of Defence.
- Thomas Doran, Professional and Technology Officer, Ministry of Defence.
- Peter Douglas, Professional and Technology Officer, Ministry of Defence.
- Michael Stanley Downes, Craftsman, Ministry of Defence.
- Mrs Alma Dowsing, Administrative Officer, Ministry of Defence.
- Peter Arnold Draper, Electrician, Property Services Agency.
- Mrs Mary Joy Druce, Administrative Officer, Ministry of Defence.
- Harold Drury, Plant Attendant, HM Prison Hatfield, Home Office.
- Kenneth Peter Drury, Process Supervisory and General Grade 'D', Ministry of Defence.
- Gilbert Charles Duckett, SGB2, Office of Population Censuses and Surveys.
- Lawrence Denis Duffy, Foreman B & CE, Property Services Agency.
- Andrew Reid Duncan, Foreman, Property Services Agency.
- John William Dunkley, Principal Officer HM YOI Glan Parva, Home Office.
- Peter Dunmore, Senior Storeman, Property Services Agency.
- Keith Dunstan, Professional and Technology Officer M, Ministry of Defence.
- Robert Stanley Dunstan, Founder, Ministry of Defence.
- Makin Bramhill Durham, IND Driver, HM Prison Hatfield, Home Office.
- Gerald William Dyer, Professional and Technology Officer, Ministry of Defence.
- Mrs Joan Francis Eva Dyer, Administrative Officer, Department of Trade and Industry.
- Glyn Owen Dykes, Lift Fitters Assistant, Property Services Agency.
- Mrs Dorren Sylvia Eames, Administrative Officer, Queen Anne's Gate, Home Office.
- Raymond Aubrey Eames, Senior Storekeeper, Ministry of Defence.
- Donald Earl, M T Driver, Property Services Agency.
- Howard Vereker Earle, Boilerman, Ministry of Defence.
- Derek Brian Earll, Craftsman, Ministry of Defence.
- Alfred George Easlick, Professional and Technology Officer M, Ministry of Defence.
- Andrew Lawson Berwick Easton, Principal Officer, Scottish Office.
- Peter Sidney Eddles, Professional and Technology Officer, Ministry of Defence.
- John Eden, Professional and Technology Officer, Ministry of Defence.
- Mrs Margaret Eden, Administrative Officer, Ministry of Defence.
- John Eddy, Foreman B & CE, Property Services Agency.
- Alan Francis Edgecumbe, Professional and Technology Officer, Ministry of Defence.
- Mrs Audrey Anne Edmunds, Administrative Officer, Norcross NB & WPD, Department of Social Security.
- William James Edmunds, Burner, Property Services Agency.
- Barrie Edwards, Administrative Officer, Ministry of Defence.
- Tracey George Edwards, Messenger, Property Services Agency.
- Bernard Charles Egerton, Instructional Officer, Home Office.
- Ronald James Elcombe, Professional and Technology Officer, Ministry of Defence.
- Courtney John Elliott, Professional and Technology Officer, Ministry of Defence.
- Michael John Elliott, Professional and Technology Officer, Ministry of Defence.
- Keith William Ellis, Electrical Fitter, Ministry of Defence.
- Thomas Ellis, Labourer, Ministry of Defence.
- William George Arthur Ellis, Craft Auxiliary Worker B, Property Services Agency.
- William James Oakes Ellis, Professional and Technology Officer, Ministry of Defence.
- Mrs Jean Valerie Emery, Administrative Assistant, Ministry of Defence.
- Harry Robert Emmerson, Engine Room Rating, Ministry of Defence.
- William John English, Mechanician in Charge, Ministry of Defence.
- David Essery, Wiring Duties, Ministry of Defence.
- David Ceri Evans, Motor Transport Driver, Ministry of Defence.
- David Emlyn Evans, Experimental Worker I, Ministry of Defence.
- David William Evans, Fitter Turner, Ministry of Defence.
- Edward John Evans, Fitter Turner, Ministry of Defence.
- John George Terry Evans, Stoker C, Property Services Agency.
- Malcolm Richard Evans, Professional and Technology Officer.
- Reginald John Evans, Foreman M & E, Property Services Agency.
- Robert Charles Evans, Shipwright, Ministry of Defence.
- Clifford Allen Evely, Welder, Ministry of Defence.
- David Ambrose Everett, Boilermaker, Ministry of Defence.
- Michael William Everett, Marine Services Officer IV, Ministry of Defence
- Desmond Paul Everitt, Instructional Officer, HM Prison Gartree, Home Office.
- Maurice George Everitt, Foreman Electrician, Property Services Agency.
- William James Fallon, Stores Officer Grade II, Ministry of Defence.
- Thomas Walter Farley, Qualified Assistant Painter, Ministry of Defence.
- James Smith Farquhar, Petty Officer Motorman, Scottish Office.
- Glenn Farrow, Professional and Technology Officer, Ministry of Defence.
- Raymond Farwell, Messenger, Ministry of Defence.
- Thomas Grant Fayers, Able Seamen Special, Ministry of Defence.
- Charles Ivan Fearn, CIO III, HM Prison Everthorpe, Home Office.
- Leslie John Federico, Professional and Technology Officer, Ministry of Defence.
- George Ferguson, Forestry Craftsman, Lough Navar Forest, Northern Ireland Office.
- Ronald Ferguson, Stores Assistant II, Ministry of Defence.
- Dennis John Ferigan, Motor Transport Driver, Ministry of Defence.
- Aurelio Ferro, Skilled Labourer, Ministry of Defence.
- Dennis Sherman Few, Professional and Technology Officer, Ministry of Defence.
- Derek Victor Field, Mobile Plant Operator, Property Services Agency.
- Frederick John Finch, Carpenter, Property Services Agency.
- Hilary Pollard Finch, Professional and Technology Officer, Ministry of Defence.
- James Findley, Electrician, Property Services Agency.
- Terence Vincent Finemore, Professional and Technology Officer, Ministry of Defence.
- Kenneth Finney, Radio Officer, Government Communications Headquarters.
- Terence Charles Finning, Professional and Technology Officer, Ministry of Defence.
- Mrs Mary Eileen Fitchie, Personnel Secretary, Ministry of Defence.
- William Flatters, Driver, Ministry of Defence.
- Walter George Flegg, Storekeeper, Ministry of Defence.
- Mrs Margaret Beryl Fletcher, Administrative Officer, Office of Population Censuses and Surveys.
- Owen Ernest Fletcher, Fitter, Property Services Agency.
- Raymond Charles Fletcher, Senior Hospital Officer, HM Prison Wormwood Scrubs, Home Office.
- Carmel Victor Gregory Flores, Rigger, Ministry of Defence.
- Michael John Foot, Skilled Labourer, Ministry of Defence.
- Ronald John Ford, Carpenter, Property Services Agency.
- George Oliver Forder, Principal Officer, Home Office.
- Clive George Foster, Professional and Technology Officer, Ministry of Defence.
- Norman Foster, Craftsman Chargehand (R&D), Ministry of Defence.
- Victor Frederick Foster, IND Stoker, HM Prison North Sea Camp, Home Office.
- Ian Lovat Fraser, Telecommunications Technical Officer II, Government Communications Headquarters.
- Patrick Anthony Frazer, Professional and Technology Technology Officer, Ministry of Defence.
- James Richard Connell Freeman, Administrative Officer, NBD, Department of Social Security.
- Snowdon Freeman, Professional and Technology Officer, Ministry of Defence.
- Reginald Arthur Freestone, Able Seaman, Ministry of Defence.
- Douglas Henry French, Storekeeping Assistant Grade II, Ministry of Defence.
- Frederick William Frewin, Foreman, M~&E, Property Services Agency.
- Brian Ernest Friend, Professional and Technology Officer, Ministry of Defence.
- Victor Gordon Friend, Officer HM Prison Parkhurst, Home Office.
- Miss Daphne Mavis Fryer, Technical Grade I, Ministry of Defence.
- Leonard John Fulford, Shipwright, Ministry of Defence.
- Philip Furlong, Chargehand Labourer, Ministry of Defence.
- William Edmund Furneaux, Professional and Technology Officer, Ministry of Defence.
- Geoffrey Walter Futter, Foreman, M&E, Property Services Agency.
- Harry Gadd, Radio Officer, Government Communications Headquarters.
- Malcolm Thomas William Gainey, Crane Driver, Ministry of Defence.
- Samuel Nimmo Galbraith, Engineering Plant Operator II, Property Services Agency.
- Robert John Gale, Carpenter, Ministry of Defence.
- Peter Galloway, Instructional Officer Grade I, Ministry of Defence.
- Peter John Gamblen, Coppersmith, Ministry of Defence.
- Brian Gammon, Stores Officer, Bridgend, Home Office.
- Mrs Kathleen Cicely Garbutt, Administrative Officer, Ministry of Defence.
- Walter Howell Gardiner, Craftsman/Inspector, Ministry of Defence.
- David John Gartrell, Professional and Technology Officer, Ministry of Defence.
- Raymond James Gartrell, Progressman Planner Technical, Ministry of Defence.
- Mrs Mary Eileen Garton, Stores Officer Grade D, Ministry of Defence.
- Peter Oliver Gates, BEM, Electrician Chargehand, Ministry of Defence.
- Graham Francis Gaydon, Professional and Technology Officer, Ministry of Defence.
- Miss June Geary, Chief Supervisor, Telecommunications Board, States of Jersey.
- Miss Doris Margaret George, Administrative Assistant, Ministry of Defence.
- Manuel Gerada, Skilled Labourer, Ministry of Defence.
- Miss Sylvia Doreen Gibbins, Personnel Secretary, Ministry of Defence.
- Ernest Edward Gibbs, Process and General Supervisory Grade 'D', Ministry of Defence.
- Arthur Gibson, Principal Officer HM Prison Parkhurst, Home Office.
- John William Gibson, Process and General Supervisory Grade C, Ministry of Defence.
- William John Gilbert, Professional and Technology Office, Ministry of Defencer.
- Alan Gilhespy, Administrative Officer, NBD, Department of Social Security.
- Geoffrey James Gilhespy, Professional and Technology Officer L, Ministry of Defence.
- Robert Gillibrand, Machine Minder, Her Majesty's Stationery Office.
- Mrs Margaret May Gillies, Administrative Officer, Ministry of Defence.
- Dennis William Gillings, Professional and Technology Officer, Ministry of Defence.
- Leslie George Giltnane, Platemaker, Her Majesty's Stationery Office.
- Ronald Alfred Thomas Ginger, Administrative Officer, Ministry of Agriculture, Fisheries and Food.
- John Frederick Gipson, Plumber, Property Services Agency.
- Ronald Albert Gisby, Groundsman, Property Services Agency.
- Derek John Glasspole, Custody Guard, Department of the Environment.
- Stanley Arthur Glaysher, Senior Storekeeper, Ministry of Defence.
- Harold Bonner Goddard, Craft Auxiliary Worker B, Property Services Agency.
- Brian David James Godfrey, Professional and Technology Officer, Ministry of Defence.
- Eric Richard Goffin, Foreman M & E, Property Services Agency.
- Antonio Gomez, Electrical Fitter, Ministry of Defence.
- Miss Ruth Gooderson, Stores Assistant I, Ministry of Defence.
- Edward Gore, Professional and Technology Officer, Ministry of Defence.
- Spencer Edward Gosden, Senior Storekeeper, Ministry of Defence.
- Keith William Gothard, Officer HM Young Offender Institution Feltham, Home Office.
- Ronald Gough, Craftsman, Ministry of Defence.
- Colin Alick Gould, Process and General Supervisory Grade C, Ministry of Defence.
- Leonard Stanley Goulding, Postal and Telegraph Officer, London Postal Region, General Post Office.
- Richard Charles Gower, Senior Officer, HM Prison Ford, Home Office.
- Edward Ivor Graham, Blacksmith, Ministry of Defence.
- Francis Thomas Graham, Blacksmith, Property Services Agency.
- Kenneth Graham, Examiner II, Ministry of Defence.
- George Henry Grainger, Crane Driver, Ministry of Defence.
- Desmond Albert Grant, Progressman Planner Technical, Ministry of Defence.
- Mrs Joan Grant, Administrative Officer, Department of Employment.
- William Gavin Grant, Examiner I, Ministry of Defence.
- James Clifford Gratton, Shipwright, Ministry of Defence.
- Philip Gordon Gratton, Foreman/Joiner, Property Services Agency.
- David Michael Gray, Professional and Technology Officer, Ministry of Defence.
- Ivor Algate Gray, Senior Storekeeper, Ministry of Defence.
- Kenneth Gray, Range Warden II, Ministry of Defence.
- Ronald Henry Thomas Graygoose, Painter, Property Services Agency.
- James Grayson, Progress and General Supervisory D.
- George Lance Green, Officer Dog Handler, HM Prison Wakefield, Home Office.
- James Grant Green, Professional Technology Officer C, Ministry of Defence.
- Laurence Lynn Green, Craftsman, Ministry of Defence.
- Robert Green, Telephonist, Government Communications Headquarters.
- John Joseph Greenaway, Mess Hand, Ministry of Defence.
- John Joseph Francis Greene, Telecoms Engineering Technician, Home Office.
- William Cyril Greene, Professional and Technology Officer, Ministry of Defence.
- Desmond Greenland, Storekeeping Assistant Grade I, Ministry of Defence.
- Joseph Greenwood, Agricultural Craftsman, Home Office.
- Peter Ernest Greenwood, Governor 4 HM Prison, Pentonville, Home Office.
- Mrs Bebe Hannah Loretta Gregory, Administrative Officer, Ministry of Defence.
- David John Gregory, Professional and Technology Officer.
- Gordon David Grenney, Forklift Truck Operator, Ministry of Defence.
- George Henry Grieveson, Craft Auxiliary Worker A, Property Services Agency.
- David Alun James Griffiths, Stores Officer Grade D, Ministry of Defence.
- Douglas Talwyn Benjamin Griffiths, Senior Officer HM Prison Swansea, Home Office.
- Robert Griffiths, Electrical Fitter, Ministry of Defence.
- Ronald Alfred Griffiths, Chargehand M & E, Property Services Agency.
- Seth Bryan Griffiths, Process & General Supervisory Grade D, Ministry of Defence.
- John Barry Grinter, Fitter Turner, Ministry of Defence.
- Kenneth Groves, Principal Officer, Prison Services, Northern Ireland Office Civil Service.
- Ronald James Guille, Quarryman, States of Guernsey.
- Mathew John Gunning, Foreman/Electrician, Property Services Agency.
- Charles William Guy, Support Grade 1, Department of Trade and Industry.
- Peter Guy, Officer, HM Prison Grendon, Home Office.
- Brian Hadley, Station Radio Officer, Government Communications Headquarters.
- Philip John Haggar, Experimental Worker I, Ministry of Defence.
- Lawrence Samuel Hague, Electrical Plant Operator II, Property Services Agency.
- Anthony Hall, Professional and Technology Officer, Ministry of Defence.
- Edward Charles Hall, SGB 2, HM Customs and Excise.
- Edward John Hall, Shipwright, Ministry of Defence.
- George Malcolm Hall, Vehicle Mechanic Chargehand, Ministry of Defence.
- Mrs Flora Jean Halliday, Typist, Department of Trade and Industry.
- Maurice Alfred Hampson, Professional and Technology Officer, Ministry of Defence.
- Alan Charles Hampton, Professional and Technology Officer, Ministry of Defence.
- Dennis Hands, Shipwright, Ministry of Defence.
- David Charles John Hannaford, Craft Auxiliary B, Ministry of Defence.
- Derek Charles Hannaford, Professional and Technology Officer C, Ministry of Defence.
- Arthur Henry Hannam, M/T Driver, Property Services Agency.
- Alec James Hannam, Principal Officer, HM Prison Winchester, Home Office.
- Bernard William Hanson, Craftsman Chargehand, Ministry of Defence.
- Philip David Harben, Process and General Supervisory Grade C, Ministry of Defence.
- Miss Elizabeth Mary Harbottle, Principal Officer, Home Office.
- Edward Arthur Hargrave, Professional and Technology Officer, Ministry of Defence.
- Derrick Keith Harper, Professional and Technology Officer, Ministry of Defence.
- Charles George William Harpin, Craftsman, Ministry of Defence.
- Raymond Melville Harries, Craftsman, Ministry of Defence.
- Arthur Donald Harris, Fitter Turner, Ministry of Defence.
- Basil Arnold Harris, Chargehand Maintenance Electrician, Ministry of Defence.
- Donald Leslie Harris, Professional and Technology Officer, Ministry of Defence.
- Trevor Michael Harris, Professional and Technology Officer, Ministry of Defence.
- Albert John Charles Harry, Professional and Technology Officer, Ministry of Defence.
- James Edward Hart, Auxiliary Electrical Worker B, Property Services Agency.
- Roy Alfred William Hart, Shipwright, Ministry of Defence.
- Cyril Joseph Henry Harvey, Equipment Examiner, Ministry of Defence.
- William Charles Henry Harvey, Professional and Technology Officer C.
- Charles James Harwood, Sheet Metal Worker, Ministry of Defence.
- John Edgar Harwood, Professional and Technology Officer, Ministry of Defence.
- Thomas Hastings, Motor Transport Driver Chargehand, Ministry of Defence.
- David Reginald Francis Hawkes, Mason, Property Services Agency.
- Alan Ernest Hawkins, Professional and Technology Officer, Ministry of Defence.
- Frederick Charles Hawton, Fitter Turner, Ministry of Defence.
- Graham Edward Gilbert Haydon, Professional and Technology Officer, Ministry of Defence.
- James David Haydon, Fitter Turner, Ministry of Defence.
- Keith Albert William Haydon, Professional and Technology Officer, Ministry of Defence.
- Ronald Thomas Haynes, Storekeeper, Ministry of Defence.
- William Charles Haynes, Experimental Worker HI, Ministry of Defence.
- Mrs Noreen Mary Hayter, Typist, Ministry of Defence.
- George Thomas Hayward, Administrative Officer, HM Customs and Excise.
- John Haywood, BEM, Professional and Technology Officer, Ministry of Defence.
- David Michael Hazeldine, Professional and Technology Officer, Ministry of Defence.
- Frank Patrick Healy, Welder, Property Services Agency.
- Thomas Joseph Hearn, Professional and Technology Officer, Ministry of Defence.
- Vernon Clifford Hearne, Head Cook, Ministry of Defence.
- Albert Clifford Heath, Chargehand B&CE, Property Services Agency.
- Albert Ernest John Heard, Stores Officer Grade 'D', Ministry of Defence.
- George Heath, Principal Officer, Home Office.
- Alex Wall Hehir, Civilian Workman HM Prison Parkhurst, Home Office.
- Anthony Hellyer, Professional and Technology Officer C, Ministry of Defence.
- Harold Hunt Henderson, Painter, Property Services Agency.
- Peter Bernard Henderson, Machinist, Ministry of Defence.
- Geoffrey Ernest Henson, Stores Officer, Grade D, Her Majesty's Stationery Office.
- Bernard George Henty, Fitter, Property Services Agency.
- Barrie James Henwood, Professional and Technology Officer, Ministry of Defence.
- Mrs Margaret Rose Hepworth, Administrative Officer, HM Prison Wakefield, Home Office.
- Philip Hesletine, Engineering Plant Operator II, Property Services Agency.
- Phillip Sydney Hewlett, Technician Class I, Cardiff, General Post Office.
- Dennis William Hibbert, Foreman M & E, Property Services Agency.
- Brian Thomas Hicks, Professional and Technology Officer, Ministry of Defence.
- Edward George Hicks, Professional and Technology Officer, Ministry of Defence.
- George Henry Thomas Hicks, Slinger, Ministry of Defence.
- Mrs Joan Hicks, Administrative Officer, Department of Trade and Industry.
- Norman Basil Higgins, Motor Transport Driver, Ministry of Defence.
- James Hildreth, Motor Transport Driver Chargehand, Ministry of Defence.
- Edward Stewart Hill, Fitter Mechanical, Property Services Agency.
- James Francis Hill, Riggers Mate, Ministry of Defence.
- Kenneth Hill, Auxiliary Electrical Worker B, Property Services Agency.
- Kenneth Peter Hill, Professional and Technology Officer, Ministry of Defence.
- William Reginald Manaton Hill, Professional and Technology Officer, Ministry of Defence.
- Graham Hillier, Administrative Officer, Ministry of Defence.
- Michael Dennis Hind, Professional and Technology Officer, Ministry of Defence.
- Reginald Hind, Engineering Plant Operator I, Property Services Agency.
- William Edgar Hine, Coppersmith, Ministry of Defence.
- Sidney Ernest John Hobbs, Insulator, Ministry of Defence.
- George Hobson, Test driver 'A ', Ministry of Defence.
- Ronald Henry Hobson, Craft Auxiliary B, Property Services Agency.
- Nicholas John Hockey, Craftsman, Ministry of Defence.
- Raymond Mervin Hodge, Professional and Technology Officer, Ministry of Defence.
- Jeffrey Harold Francis Hodges, Professional and Technology Officer, Ministry of Defence.
- Kenneth Hodgson, Trades Officer HM Prison Winchester, Home Office.
- David Dinnie Fraser Hogg, Support Grade Band 1, Ministry of Defence.
- William Brian Holder, Leading Houseman, Natural History Museum.
- Derek Alfred Holdsworth, Professional and Technology Officer, Ministry of Defence.
- Philip Norman Holloway, Craft Auxiliary B, Property Services Agency.
- David John Holmes, Carpenter/Joiner, Property Services Agency.
- Mrs Joan Holmes, Local Officer II, Lowestoft, Department of Social Security.
- Mrs Betty Ann Sarah Honey, Administrative Assistant, Home Office.
- David Francis Honey, Professional and Technology Officer, Ministry of Defence.
- Ronald Norman Honey, Professional and Technology Officer, Ministry of Defence.
- George Desmond Hope, Motor Transport Driver, Ministry of Defence.
- Mrs Hetty Dorothea Horlock, Messenger, Ministry of Defence.
- Frank Bertram Horn, Boilermaker, Ministry of Defence.
- Terence Walter Horn, Auxiliary Electrical Worker 'B ', Property Services Agency.
- George Herbert Horne, Professional and Technology Officer, Ministry of Defence.
- Raymond Hedley Horne, Professional Technology Officer M, Ministry of Defence.
- Roger Thomas Hoskin, Professional and Technology Officer, Ministry of Defence.
- Leonard John Hosking, Support Grade Band 2, Dumbarton Sheriff Court, Scottish Office.
- Ronald Stephen Hosking, Welder, Ministry of Defence
- John Henry Houghton, Administrative Officer, Ministry of Defence.
- Barry Eugene Howe, Officer HM Prison Leeds, Home Office.
- Desmond George Howe, Telecoms Mechanic, Home Office.
- Frederick Charles William Howe, Process & General Supervisory Grade E, Ministry of Defence.
- John Courtenay Howe, Administrative Officer, Department of Transport.
- Gordon Russell Hoy, Bricklayer, HM Prison Ashwell, Home Office.
- Norman Leonard Hudd, Principal Officer HM Prison Blundeston, Home Office.
- Morgan Hughes, Craft Auxiliary Worker, Property Services Agency.
- Mrs Shirley Ann Hughes, Administrative Officer, Department of Trade and Industry.
- Thomas John Hughes, Motor Transport Driver, Ministry of Defence.
- John Eric Percival Humble, Engineering Plant Operator II, Property Services Agency.
- Peter Raymond Hunkin, Professional and Technology Officer, Ministry of Defence.
- Edward Hunt, Motor Transport Driver, Ministry of Defence.
- Gordon Arthur Hunt, Fitter/Turner, Ministry of Defence.
- Maurice Harold Hunt, Storekeeper, Ministry of Defence.
- Maurice William Colin Hunt, Instructional Officer Grade I, Ministry of Defence.
- Robert Hunter, Patrolman, Ministry of Defence.
- John Ross Hurst, Professional and Technology Officer, Ministry of Defence.
- Harold Huson, Electrical Fitter, Ministry of Defence.
- William John Bowden Hutchings, Process and General Supervisory B, Ministry of Defence.
- James Hutchinson, Craft Auxiliary Worker 'B', Property Services Agency.
- James John Hutson, Administrative Assistant, Department of Trade and Industry.
- Clifford George Huxham, Shipwright, Ministry of Defence.
- Geoffrey Richard I'Anson, Gardener, Property Services Agency.
- Harold James Isaacs, Professional and Technology Officer, Ministry of Defence.
- Peter Garfield Ivey, TET, Depot Shapwick, Home Office
- Alfred John Archie Bell, Support Grade Band I, Ministry of Defence.
- Joseph Ingham, Auxiliary Electrical Worker A, Property Services Agency.
- Gilbert Roland Jack, C/H Plumber, Property Services Agency.
- Russell George Malcolm Jackson, Plumber, Ministry of Defence.
- Thomas Ilderton Jackson, Farm Foreman, Home Office.
- David Richard James Jago, Professional and Technology Officer, Ministry of Defence.
- Robert Desmond Jago, Professional and Technology Officer, Ministry of Defence.
- Alfred Peter Donald James, Craftsman, Ministry of Defence.
- Frederick Victor James, Carpenter, Property Services Agency.
- Gordon Arthur James, Experimental Worker I, Ministry of Defence.
- Mrs Joan Margaret James, Administrative Officer, Ministry of Defence.
- Leonard Alfred James, Craft Auxiliary B, Ministry of Defence.
- Leonard Lyn James, Radio Officer, Government Communications Headquarters.
- Ronald James, Officer HM Prison Swansea, Home Office.
- William James James, Professional and Technology Officer, Ministry of Defence.
- Thomas King Jamieson, Auxiliary Electrical Worker 'B ', Property Services Agency.
- Reginald Walter Janes, Professional Technology Officer C, Ministry of Defence.
- George Frederick Jarvis, Administrative Officer, Ministry of Defence.
- Gordon Ernest Jarvis, Equipment Examiner, Ministry of Defence.
- Roger Francis Jasper, Professional Technology Officer L, Ministry of Defence.
- Barry Glyn Jeffery, Craft Auxiliary Worker A, Property Services Agency.
- Robert John Jefford, Professional and Technology Officer, Ministry of Defence.
- Beverley Graham Jenkins, Professional and Technology Officer, Ministry of Defence.
- John Arthur Jenkins, Shipwright, Ministry of Defence.
- Kenneth Raymond Wilson Jenkins, Aircraft Fitter, Ministry of Defence.
- Derek Jermyn, Progress and General Supervisory D, Ministry of Defence.
- Joseph Ernest Jessop, Telecoms Engineering Technician, Home Office.
- Mrs Hilda Jobling, Local Officer II, Barnsley ILO, Department of Social Security.
- Terence David George John, General Hand, Ministry of Defence.
- Keith William John, Professional and Technology Officer, Ministry of Defence.
- Barry Allan Johns, Professional and Technology Officer, Ministry of Defence.
- Maurice David Johns, Shipwright, Ministry of Defence.
- Roger Alfred Johns, Professional and Technology Officer, Ministry of Defence.
- Brian Henry Joseph Johnson, Professional and Technology Officer.
- Derek Arthur Johnson, Chargehand Electrical Fitter, Ministry of Defence.
- Eric Johnson, Administrative Officer, Ministry of Defence.
- Wilfred Johnson, Motor Transport Driver, Ministry of Defence.
- James Johnston, Specialist A Machine Operator, Department of Agriculture, Northern Ireland Civil Service.
- Robert James Johnston, Forestry Supervisor, Department of Agriculture, Northern Ireland Civil Service.
- Samuel Johnston, EPO II, Property Services Agency.
- Anthony James Jones, Stores Assistant Grade I, Ministry of Defence.
- Brian Melville Jones, Groundsman II, Property Services Agency.
- Cyril Jones, General Fitter, Ministry of Defence.
- David Edward Henry Jones, Shipwright, Ministry of Defence.
- David Henry Jones, Craft Auxiliary A, Ministry of Defence.
- Dennis Roland Jones, Bricklayer, Property Services Agency.
- Edward Charles Jones, Bricklayer, Property Services Agency.
- Mrs Eilir Ann Jones, Steward II, Ministry of Defence.
- Ernest Cyril Jones, Auxiliary Electrical Worker, Property Services Agency.
- Glyndwr Jones, Principal Officer, HM Prison Lewes, Home Office
- Harold Jones, Hospital Officer, HM Prison Winchester, Home Office.
- Mrs Maureen Sybil Jones, Administrative Officer, Ministry of Defence.
- Maurice Stanley Jones, Storekeeper, Ministry of Defence.
- Robert Jones, Main Labourer, Grade IV, Department of Agriculture, Northern Ireland Civil Service.
- Robert Walter Jones, Professional and Technology Officer, Ministry of Defence.
- Ronald Raphael Jones, Civilian Workman HM Young Offender Institution Aylesbury, Home Office.
- William Graham Jones, Turner, Ministry of Defence.
- John Jose, Professional and Technology Officer M, Ministry of Defence.
- Peter Michael Keating, Professional and Technology Officer, Ministry of Defence.
- John Kellett, Progressman Non-Technical, Ministry of Defence.
- George Thomas Kelly, Professional and Technology Officer, Ministry of Defence.
- John David Kelly, Senior Hospital Officer, Home Office.
- Ronald Kelly, Professional and Technology Officer, Ministry of Defence.
- Terence Arthur Kelly, Professional and Technology Officer, Ministry of Defence.
- Albert Kemish, Painter, Ministry of Defence.
- John Henry Kemsley, Professional and Technology Officer, Ministry of Defence.
- Mrs Betty Maureen Kendall, Typist, Ministry of Defence.
- Herbert Norman Kendall, Professional and Technology Officer, Ministry of Defence.
- Mrs Doris Kent, Administrative Officer, Peterborough Passport Office.
- Michael Herbert Kessell, Professional and Technology Officer Recorder, Ministry of Defence.
- Miss Phyllis Mary Kew, Administrative Assistant.
- Brian Arthur Kidd, Professional and Technology Officer, Ministry of Defence.
- John Kenneth Kimber, Senior Officer Instructor, Ministry of Defence.
- Edward James King, Able Seaman, Ministry of Defence.
- Felix George King, Foreman B&CE, Property Services Agency.
- Mrs Joan King, Mapping and Charting Technical Grade II, Ministry of Defence.
- Peter King, Radio Officer, Government Communications Headquarters.
- Alexander Kinnear, Process and General Supervisory Grade 'E', Ministry of Defence.
- Terence Harris Kinsman, Professional and Technology Officer, Ministry of Defence.
- Mrs Mavis Ann Kirby, Administrative Officer, Ministry of Defence.
- Alan Michael Knapman, Professional and Technology Officer, Ministry of Defence.
- Alan Frederick Knight, Fitter Turner, Ministry of Defence.
- Barry Delwyn Knight, Professional and Technology Officer, Ministry of Defence.
- James Richard Knight, Chargehand Electrician, Property Services Agency.
- John Howard Knight, Professional and Technology Officer, Ministry of Defence.
- Richard Stephen Charles Knight, Professional and Technology Officer.
- Roy Michael Knight, Foreman Fitter, Property Services Agency.
- Terence Knight, Professional and Technology Officer, Ministry of Defence
- John Knights, Craft Auxiliary Worker B, Property Services Agency.
- Graham George Lacey, General Hand, Ministry of Defence.
- Miss Jacqueline Emily Lainton, Senior Storekeeper, Ministry of Defence.
- Melvin Cyril Laird, Motor Transport Driver, Ministry of Defence.
- James William Lamb, Stonemason, Property Services Agency.
- James Frederick Stanley Lambard, Instructional Officer, Ministry of Defence.
- Mrs Binnie Jal Lambourne, Personal Secretary, Department of Trade and Industry.
- Miss Hilda Gladys Land, Support Grade Band, Ministry of Defence.
- Joseph Albert Lane, Boilermaker, Ministry of Defence.
- Miss Iris Betty Lang, Administrative Officer, Ministry of Defence.
- William Colin Lang, Professional and Technology Officer, Ministry of Defence.
- Miss Jessie Eileen Langford, Stores Assistant Grade I, Ministry of Defence.
- Terry Gill Langford, Professional and Technology Officer, Ministry of Defence.
- Dennis Joseph Lansley, Fitter, Ministry of Defence.
- Paul Bertram Last, Mess Hand, Ministry of Defence.
- Hugh Roy Laugharne, Machinist, Ministry of Defence.
- Graeham John Lavers, Shipwright, Ministry of Defence.
- Miss Doris Jean Law, Storekeeper, Ministry of Defence.
- Peter Lawley, Stores Assistant Grade I, Ministry of Defence.
- Mrs Ida Lawrence, Personal Secretary, Her Majesty's Treasury.
- Maurice Frank Lawrence, Sewage Plant Attendant, Property Services Agency.
- Percy Valentine Lawrence, Stores Officer Grade C, Ministry of Defence.
- Roger Meban Lawrence, Process and General Supervisory Grade D, Ministry of Defence.
- Walter Lawrence, Sailmaker, Ministry of Defence.
- Miss Mary Ann Maxwell Lawson, Administrative Officer, Ministry of Defence.
- Brian Thomas Layers, Stores Officer Grade 'D ', Ministry of Defence.
- Graeme Le Breton, Technical Officer, Telecommunications Board, States of Jersey.
- Adrian Edmund Lee, Higher Instructional Officer, Ministry of Defence.
- Arthur Joseph Lee, Senior Officer, HM Prison Garth, Home Office.
- Raymond Lee, Principal Officer Prison Service College Wakefield, Home Office.
- Michael Francis Leggatt, Shipwright, Ministry of Defence.
- Maurice Edwin Lemon, Foreman M & E, Property Services Agency.
- Dennis Arthur Leslie, Woodcutting Machinist, Ministry of Defence.
- Derek Alfred Lewis, Foreman Painter, Property Services Agency.
- Norman Lewis, Administrative Officer, Ministry of Defence.
- William Henry Lewis, Vehicle Mechanic, Ministry of Defence.
- William Peter Lewis, Foreman M & E, Property Services Agency.
- Geoffrey John Lilly, Electrical Fitter, Ministry of Defence.
- Peter Lines, Painter HM Prison Stoke Heath, Home Office.
- Christopher Lingard, Process and General Supervisory Grade D, Ministry of Defence.
- Alan George Linkin, Labourer, Property Services Agency.
- William MacLaughlin Linton, Supervisor, Department of Agriculture, Northern Ireland Civil Service.
- Reginald Terence Lisney, Higher Instructional Officer, Ministry of Defence.
- Mrs Margaret Little, Typing Manager, HM Treasury.
- Donald Norval Lloyd, Principal Officer, Home Office.
- Peter Lobb, Coppersmith, Ministry of Defence.
- John Christopher Frederick Lock, Compositor, Ministry of Defence.
- Mrs Joyce Pamela Lock, Support Manager III Government Telephonist, Ministry of Defence.
- Leonard Lock, Motor Transport Fitter, Ministry of Defence.
- Colin Dennis Ivan Long, Printer, Property Services Agency.
- Stanley Joseph Long, Craft Auxiliary Worker 'B', Property Services Agency.
- George Harold Lovell, Electrical Fitter, Ministry of Defence.
- Miss Patricia Violet Lovelock, Personal Secretary, Ministry of Defence.
- Desmond John Lowden, Shipwright, Ministry of Defence.
- Lawrence Lowther, Principal Officer, Home Office.
- Neil Anthony Luxton, Skilled Labourer, Ministry of Defence.
- Christopher Lynch, Electrical Fitter, Ministry of Defence.
- Miss Christine Macdonald, Officer (Instructor), Scottish Office.
- Ian Macintyre Macdougall, Administrative Assistant, Ministry of Defence.
- Raymond Mace, Plant Attendant, Property Services Agency.
- Mrs Norah Catherine Macgregor, Administrative Assistant, Ministry of Defence.
- Alexander MacDonald Macleod, Senior Storekeeper, Ministry of Defence.
- Mrs Jean Forbes Proctor Buchan Macleod, Administrative Assistant, Ministry of Defence.
- Mrs Joan Macleod, Cook, Ministry of Defence.
- Donald Frederick Macpherson, Administrative Officer, Department of Transport.
- John Burdett Maddocks, Support Manager III, Ministry of Defence.
- Ronald Edward Maggs, Principal Officer, HM Prison Highpoint, Home Office.
- Daniel Maguire, Forestry Craftsman, Department of Agriculture, Northern Ireland Office Civil Service..
- Norman Maguire, Painter, Property Services Agency.
- William George Mannering, Publications Handler, Her Majesty's Stationery Office.
- Donald Mapplebeck, Hospital Officer, HM Prison Lowdham Grange, Home Office.
- Jack Leslie Marchant, Administrative Assistant, Ministry of Defence.
- Mrs Hilda Mary Marmont, Administrative Officer, Ministry of Defence.
- Reginald Ivor Marsh, Scaffolder.
- Miss Rene Ethel Mary Marsh, Typist, Ministry of Defence.
- Miss Josephine Sarah Catherine Marriott, Typist, Ministry of Defence.
- Mrs Ellen May Marshall, Administrative Officer, Ministry of Defence.
- Leslie George Ernest Marshall, Electrician, Property Services Agency.
- Peter Marshall, Telecommunications Engineer Technician, Bridgend, Home Office.
- Miss Clare Florence Martin, Support Grade Band II, Ministry of Defence.
- Robert John Martin, Assistant Telecommunications Technical Officer, Ministry of Defence.
- Stanley John Martin, Shipwright, Ministry of Defence.
- Thomas Martin, Turner, Ministry of Defence.
- Manuel Martinez, Able Seaman, Ministry of Defence.
- Mrs Barbara Mason, Support Grade Band I (Telephonist), Ministry of Defence.
- George Frederick Matcha, Patrolman, Ministry of Defence.
- David John Mathias, Process and General Supervisory Grade B, Ministry of Defence.
- Derek William Mathias, Writer to SPTO, Ministry of Defence.
- Frederick Mathias, Driver Articulated, Ministry of Defence, Ministry of Defence.
- Norman Whitfield Mathias, Explosive Maintenance Assistant.
- Albert Reginald May, Higher Instructional Officer, Ministry of Defence.
- David Joseph May, Plumber, Ministry of Defence.
- Michael Henry George May, Boilermaker, Ministry of Defence.
- Desmond McClinton, Senior Technician, Building Site Liaison Officer, States of Jersey.
- Mrs Janet Thomson McCran, Personal Secretary, Ministry of Defence.
- Eric Victor McCullagh, Electrician, Property Services Agency.
- Alan Malcolm McCullough, Professional and Technology Officer, Ministry of Defence.
- Thomas McDonald, General Hand, Ministry of Defence.
- Larry William McEwen, Professional and Technology Officer, Ministry of Defence.
- Colin Michael McGarrigle, Rigger, Property Services Agency.
- Daniel Joseph McGinty, Process and General Supervisory Grade 'E, Ministry of Defence'.
- Philip Joseph McGowan, Messenger, Property Services Agency.
- William McHenry, Progressman Non-Technical, Ministry of Defence.
- James Daniel McIntosh, Stores Officer Grade D.
- Colin McKay, Principal Officer, Scottish Office.
- Brian Paul McKenna, Stores Officer Grade D, Ministry of Defence.
- James McKerral, Craft Auxiliary Worker A, Property Services Agency.
- Samuel McKibbin, Craftsman Fitter, Ministry of Defence.
- Mario McLaren, Rigger, Ministry of Defence.
- John McLaughlin, Assistant Telecommunications Technical Officer, Ministry of Defence.
- Peter McLaughlin, Painter, Property Services Agency.
- Alexander McFadyen McLean, Shipwright, Ministry of Defence.
- George Donald McLellan, Chargehand Plumber, Property Services Agency.
- Robert James McMillan, Craft Auxiliary Worker Grade A, Property Services Agency.
- David Edward McNamara, Principal Clerk Officer, Cornton Vale, Scottish Office.
- Edward McSorley, Local Officer II, Warrington ILO, Department of Social Security.
- Roy Arthur McTurk, Electrical Fitter, Ministry of Defence.
- Albert Leonard Victor Mead, Craft Auxiliary Worker A, Property Services Agency.
- David Terence Meades, Forman B&CE, Property Services Agency.
- Mrs Dorothy Ethel Meagre, Administrative Assistant, Corby, Home Office.
- Peter Medway, Professional and Technology Officer, Ministry of Defence.
- Mrs Rita Elizabeth Mehmet, Administrative Officer, Ministry of Defence.
- Jack Trevor Melton, Professional and Technology Officer, Ministry of Defence.
- Lionel Menez, Telecommunications Mechanic, Ministry of Defence.
- Miss Mary Ann Brown Merrilees, Administrative Officer, Ministry of Defence.
- John Bernard Middleditch, Agricultural Craftsman, HM Prison Hollesley Bay Colony, Home Office.
- William Joseph Middup, Officer Dog Handler, HM Prison Lincoln, Home Office.
- John Raymond Midgley, MT Driver, Property Services Agency.
- Mrs Eileen Gladys Milam, Administrative Assistant, Ministry of Defence.
- Anthony Phillip Charles Miles, Craft Auxiliary Worker Grade B, Property Services Agency.
- David Leslie Miles, Property Services Agency.
- James Miller, Principal Officer, HM Prison Frankland, Home Office.
- Joseph Richard Miller, Storekeeper, Ministry of Defence.
- Ronald Arthur Miller, Leading Chargehand Vehicle Fitter, Ministry of Defence.
- John Charles Bruce Millman, Shipwright, Ministry of Defence.
- Frank George Mitchell, Craftsman Chargehand, Ministry of Defence.
- William Ronald Mitchison, Chargehand Electrician, Property Services Agency.
- Brian Floyd Molyneux, Forman M&E, Property Services Agency.
- David Leonard Moore, Principal Officer HM Prison Winchester, Home Office.
- Wilfred Frederick Pethick Moore, Head Messenger, Ministry of Defence.
- Donald Michael Moreland, SGB2 Storekeeper, Ordnance Survey,
- David Ian Morgan, Prison Officer, HM Prison, Swansea, Home Office.
- Henry William Morgan, Welder, Property Services Agency.
- John Lewis James Morris, Stores Officer Grade D, Ministry of Defence.
- Kenneth George Howard Morris, General Hand, Ministry of Defence.
- Mrs Jill Mildred Ellen Morris, Personal Secretary, Ministry of Defence.
- George Morrison, Craftsman, Ministry of Defence.
- Miss Susan Florence Mary Mosedale, Senior Storekeeper, Ministry of Defence.
- Raymond Leonard Moss, Craftsman, Ministry of Defence.
- William Ralph Moss, Carpenter, Property Services Agency.
- John Edward Moughton, Telecommunications Technical Officer II, Government Communications Headquarters.
- George Hunter Moyes, Patrolman, Ministry of Defence.
- Brian Wilfred Moyse, Professional and Technology Officer, Ministry of Defence.
- Patrick Charles Mullarkey, Foreman M & E, Property Services Agency.
- Stanley Richard Mumford, Boilermaker, Ministry of Defence.
- James Simon Christopher Munro, Equipment Examiner, Ministry of Defence.
- Alfred Murphy, Auxiliary Officer, Home Office.
- Joseph Murphy, Forestry Craftsman, Department of Agriculture, Northern Ireland Civil Service.
- Thomas Gerard Murphy, Electrician, Property Services Agency.
- Peter Gray Murray, Skilled Labourer, Ministry of Defence.
- John Harold Musselwhite, Mess Hand, Ministry of Defence.
- George Albert Edward Myles, Bricklayer, Property Services Agency.
- Reginald Dennis Myers, Principal Office, HM Prison Morton Hall, Home Office.
- James Gordon Naish, Storekeeper, Ministry of Defence.
- Albert Neal, Auxiliary Electrical Worker B, Property Services Agency.
- John David Nelson, Senior Storeman, Property Services Agency.
- Lawrence John Nelson, Process and General Supervisory Grade 'D', Ministry of Defence.
- Ronald Alfred Newnham, Carpenter/Joiner, Property Services Agency.
- Cyril John Newton, Plumber, Property Services Agency.
- John James Newton, Instructional Officer I, Ministry of Defence.
- Brian Nicol, Professional and Technology Officer Recorder, Ministry of Defence.
- Ivor John Nicholas, Explosives Maintenance Assistant, Ministry of Defence.
- Kenneth Claude Nightingale, Safety Equipment Worker B, Ministry of Defence.
- Hugh Niven, Process and General Supervisory Grade D, Ministry of Defence.
- Kenneth Edwards Nobbs, Process and General Supervisory Grade D, Ministry of Defence.
- Brian James Nodder, Shipwright/Liner.
- Bert Harry Norris, Driver, Property Services Agency.
- Mrs Gwendoline Jessie Norris, Administrative Officer, Ministry of Defence.
- William George Norris, Driver, Property Services Agency.
- David George Norsworthy, Professional and Technology Officer.
- Maurice Northey, Equipment Examiner, Ministry of Defence.
- Stephen Lucas Northmore, Professional and Technology Officer C, Ministry of Defence.
- Anthony John Nosworthy, Professional and Technology Officer, Ministry of Defence.
- John Patrick Nunn, Foreman, Department of the Environment.
- Albert Henry Nutt, Driver, Ministry of Defence.
- Patrick Oakes, Fitter, Property Services Agency.
- Miss Joan Blanche Oates, Administrative Officer, Ministry of Defence.
- Colin Ogilvie, Senior Storekeeper, Ministry of Defence.
- Mrs Iris May Offen, Administrative Officer, Department of Social Security.
- Mrs Eileen Joyce Offley, Local Officer II, Department of Social Security.
- Donald Francis O'Hare, Storekeeper, Ministry of Defence.
- Miss Anne O'Keeffe, Administrative Officer, Ministry of Defence.
- Robert William O'Keefe, Joiner, Ministry of Defence.
- Joseph Roseby Oldfield, Foreman M&E, Property Services Agency, Ministry of Defence.
- Samuel Richard Oldridge, Professional and Technology Officer.
- Terence Patrick O'Neill, Process and General Supervisory, Grade D, Ministry of Defence.
- John Ernest Phillip Oram, Senior Officer, HM Prison, Pucklechurch, Home Office.
- Brian Kenneth Orpwood, Driver, Property Services Agency.
- David Edward Owen, Professional and Technology Officer C, Ministry of Defence.
- George James Denzil Owen, Crane Driver, Ministry of Defence.
- Phillip Dyfric Owen, Stores Officer Grade C, Ministry of Defence.
- Miss Vera Marjorie Owen, Local Officer II, Baling, Department of Social Security.
- Mrs Jean Pauline Paddick, Experimental Worker II, Ministry of Defence.
- Kenneth James Padwick, Professional and Technology Officer, Ministry of Defence.
- Derek Cecil Page, Professional and Technology Officer, Ministry of Defence.
- Roy Henry Paice, Boatswain, Ministry of Defence.
- Charles Edward Roy Palmer, Shipwright, Ministry of Defence.
- Clive Beresford Pammer, Fitter Chargehand, Ministry of Defence.
- Barrie Raymond Parfitt, Senior Hospital Officer, HM Prison Huntercoombe, Home Office.
- Mrs Nancy Mary Pargeter, Administrative Officer, Department of Employment.
- David Parker, Non Craft Industrial 4, Government Communications Headquarters.
- Terence Parker, Publications Supervisor, Her Majesty's Stationery Office.
- Michael Charles Parkes, Shipwright, Ministry of Defence.
- Lawrence Gordon Parkin, Higher Instructional Officer, Ministry of Defence.
- George William Weston Parker, Steward II, Ministry of Defence.
- Miss Doreen Elizabeth Parratt, Administrative Assistant, Ministry of Defence.
- Ronald Frank Partridge, Officer, HM Prison Driver Bedford, Home Office.
- David John Pascoe, Plant Operator, Ministry of Defence.
- Hector Patterson, Chargehand, Property Services Agency.
- John Herbert Pattimore, Fitter, Property Services Agency.
- Keith Alan Payne, Officer Bricklayer, HM Prison Leicester, Home Office.
- Kenneth Brian Payne, Assistant Painter, Ministry of Defence.
- James Ivor Payter, Engineering Plant Operator II, Property Services Agency.
- Kenneth Edward Peach, Machinist, Ministry of Defence.
- Leslie Francis Peach, Carpenter/Joiner, Property Services Agency.
- Reginald Anthony Peacock, Carpenter, Ministry of Defence.
- Gerard Peake, Administrative Officer, NFCO, Department of Social Security.
- William Derek Pearce, Professional and Technology Officer, Ministry of Defence.
- Leonard Stanley Pearman, Publications Handler, Her Majesty's Stationery Office.
- James Robert Pearson, Foreman Electrician, Property Services Agency.
- Mrs Joan Pearson, Administrative Officer, Ministry of Defence.
- Robert Bacon Pearson, Auxiliary Electrical Worker B, Property Services Agency.
- Bernard Oliver Peart, Assistant Painter, Ministry of Defence.
- Sydney Charles Francis Pease, Painter, Property Services Agency.
- Mrs Dorothy Grace Pedersen, Administrative Officer, Ministry of Defence.
- Raymond Albert Pellow, Technology Officer C, Ministry of Defence.
- Charles Herbert Pepler, Electrician, Property Services Agency.
- Mrs Jean Winifred Margaret Perkin, Leading Tracer, Ministry of Defence
- Mrs June Pearl Perry, Administrative Officer, Ministry of Defence.
- John Pestana, Administrative Officer, Department of Trade and Industry.
- Ivor Gordon Peters, Auxiliary Officer, Home Office.
- Roger Basil Peters, Hospital Officer, HM Prison, Maidstone, Home Office.
- Bernard Phillips, Hosemaker, Ministry of Defence.
- John Albert Phillips, Skilled Labourer, Ministry of Defence.
- John Dennis Phillips, Process Worker II, Ministry of Defence.
- Mrs Joyce Phillips, Storekeeper, Ministry of Defence.
- Oswald Monroe Piggott, Chargehand, Property Services Agency.
- Gordon Arthur Pillage, Professional Technology Officer, Ministry of Defence.
- Arthur Reginald Pilliner, Senior Storekeeper, Ministry of Defence.
- John James Pinhey, Chief Steward II, Ministry of Defence.
- Leslie Dennis Pitt, Stoker C, Ministry of Defence.
- Geoffrey Gordon Pollard, Professional and Technology Officer M, Ministry of Defence.
- Thomas Frederick Norman Pollard, Steward II, Ministry of Defence.
- Alwyn Bernard Pooley, Telecommunications Mechanic, Ministry of Defence.
- James Porter, Rigger, Ministry of Defence.
- Alan Powell, Shipwright, Ministry of Defence.
- Brian Arthur Powell, Senior Trades Officer, HM Prison, Shepton Mallet, Home Office.
- Mrs Jemima Dunlop Powell, Support Grade I, Ministry of Defence.
- David Power, Process and General Supervisory D, Ministry of Defence.
- Michael John Powley, Senior Officer, Home Office.
- Thomas George Anthony Preece, Jig Borer, Ministry of Defence.
- Eric McLaren Preston, Foreman M&E, Property Services Agency.
- Derrick Brian Price, Test Driver 'A ', Ministry of Defence.
- Miss June Margaret Elizabeth Price, Local Officer II, Department of Social Security.
- Mrs Irene Margaret Prior, Senior Storekeeper, Ministry of Defence.
- Mrs Joan Ellen Proctor, Administrative Officer, Ministry of Defence.
- Elfed Herbert Pugh, Prison Officer, Home Office.
- Mrs Mary Pugson, Typist, Ministry of Defence.
- Arthur James Pursey, Stores Officer Grade D, Ministry of Defence.
- Charles Bath Purvis, Administrative Officer, Ministry of Defence.
- Ivor Derek Quickenden, BEM, Craftsmen, Ministry of Defence.
- Roy Eyre Quirk, Progressman Planner Technical, Ministry of Defence.
- Keith Rackley, Test Driver 'A ', Ministry of Defence.
- Joseph Edward Raglan, Slinger, Ministry of Defence.
- George Rainbow, Foreman B & CE, Property Services Agency.
- Garth Cumes Randall, Experimental Worker Grade I, Ministry of Agriculture, Fisheries and Food.
- William Alfred Randall, Process and General Supervisory Grade D, Ministry of Defence.
- William Arthur Randall, Refuse Collector, Ministry of Defence.
- Bernard Alfred Raven, Carpenter/Joiner, Property Services Agency.
- Mrs Marjorie Alma Rawlings, Administrative Officer, Ministry of Defence.
- Dennis Charles Read, Patrolman, Ministry of Defence.
- Douglas Arthur Read, Plumber, Property Services Agency.
- Mrs Rose Lila Readings, Administrative Officer, Ministry of Defence.
- Douglas Harry Redknap, Instrument Worker, Ministry of Defence.
- Keith Reedman, Forman M&E, Property Services Agency.
- Mrs Elizabeth Purdie Allan Reid, Typist, Department of Trade and Industry.
- Leonard James Reid, Craftsman/Inspector, Ministry of Defence.
- William Paul Reveley, Professional and Technology Officer, Ministry of Defence.
- John Reynolds, Plumber, Property Services Agency.
- Ronald John Rich, Functional Slinger, Ministry of Defence.
- John Richard, CIO III HM Prison Cardiff, Home Office.
- Kenneth Gwilym Richards, Administrative Officer, Ministry of Defence.
- Peter William Richards, Professional and Technology Officer M, Ministry of Defence.
- Dennis Richardson, Fitter Turner, Ministry of Defence.
- Miss Maureen Angela Mary Riddle, Administrative Officer, Ministry of Defence.
- Robert Riddoch, Principal Clerk Officer, Inverness, Scottish Office.
- Anthony Victor Arnold Ridge, Craft Auxiliary Worker, Property Service Agency.
- Jose Luis Robba, Administrative Officer, Ministry of Defence.
- Brinley John Robert, Storekeeper, Ministry of Defence.
- Alfred Sydney Roberts, Craftsman, Ministry of Defence.
- Brian Mortimer Roberts, Fitter Turner, Ministry of Defence.
- Frederick Roberts, Craft Auxiliary Worker 'A', Property Services Agency,
- Norman Thomas Roberts, Principal Officer HM Prison Winchester, Home Office.
- William Roberts, TET, Marley Hill, Home Office.
- John Joseph Robertson, Fitter Turner, Ministry of Defence.
- Michael Adrian Robey, Telecommunications Technical Officer II, Government Communications Headquarters.
- John Albert Robinson, Storekeeping Assistant Grade I, Ministry of Defence.
- Kenneth Clifford Robinson, Surgery Assistant, Ministry of Defence.
- Leslie George Robinson, Foreman B & CE, Property Services Agency.
- James Walter Rogerson, Principal Trades Officer, HM Prison, Durham, Home Office.
- Ignace Gabriel Rolando, Forman, Property Services Agency.
- Mark Rothman, Administrative Officer, Department of Trade and Industry.
- Dennis Rowe, Professional and Technology Officer C, Ministry of Defence.
- William Kenneth Rowe, Senior Officer, HM Prison, Norwich, Home Office.
- Mrs Janet Rowlands, Administrative Officer CICB, Home Office.
- Peter William Royal, Craft Auxiliary Worker 'B', Property Services Agency.
- Harold John Rubotham, Principal Officer, HM Prison, Standford Hill, Home Office.
- Dennis Rudkin, Test Driver 'B', Ministry of Defence.
- Trevor James Rumsey, Foreman B & CE, Property Services Agency.
- Peter Gerald Ruse, Foreman M&E, Property Services Agency.
- Anthony George Russell, Professional and Technology Officer L, Ministry of Defence.
- Douglas James Russell, Writer to Senior Professional and Technology Officer, Ministry of Defence.
- Miss Audrey Saddon, Technical Grade I, Ministry of Defence.
- Robert Arthur Saffery, Officer Instructor, Home Office.
- Mervyn Salvage, Motor Transport Driver, Ministry of Defence.
- Brian William Sanderson, Coppersmith, Ministry of Defence.
- Mrs Barbara Sangster, Administrative Officer, Ministry of Defence.
- Denis Victor Saunders, Scaffolder, Ministry of Defence.
- Geoffrey John Saunders, Radio Officer, Government Communications Headquarters.
- Graham Saunders, Cleaner, Ministry of Defence.
- Eric Sergeant, Principal Works Officer, Home Office.
- Godfrey Alan Sargeant, Plumber, Property Services Agency.
- Alan William Saunders, Plumber, Ministry of Defence.
- James Edward Patrick Saunders, Custody Guard, Department of the Environment.
- Mrs Joan Saunders, Support Grade Band I, Ministry of Defence.
- Michael John Savine, MT Driver, Property Services Agency.
- Mrs Barbara Winifred Sayell, Administrative Officer, Department of Employment.
- Raymond Donald Terence Sayers, Craft Auxiliary Worker 'A', Property Services Agency.
- David Scott, Craftsman, Ministry of Defence.
- Mrs Hilda Scott, Local Officer II, Openshaw ILO, Department of Social Security.
- Mrs Marjorie Scott, Administrative Officer, HMYOI, Kirklevington Grange, Home Office.
- Alan Charles Seaman, Administrative Assistant, Ministry of Defence.
- Hugh Bernard Seneviratne, Fitter, Property Services Agency.
- John Grenville Setterfield, Driver Articulated, Ministry of Defence.
- Michael Sevilla, Foreman, Property Services Agency.
- Alan Leslie Sexton, Plumber, Property Services Agency.
- Alister Sharpe, Vehicle Mechanic, Ministry of Defence.
- Colin Shaw, Principal Officer, Home Office.
- Harold Leslie Shaw, Painter, Ministry of Defence.
- James Shaw, Foreman, Property Services Agency.
- Robert Shaw, Storekeeper, Ministry of Defence.
- Stanley Shaw, Vehicle Mechanic, Ministry of Defence.
- John Brendan Shiels, Fitter M/T, Property Services Agency.
- Mrs Sylvia Joyce Shore, Senior Storekeeper Dunskwell, Home Office.
- John Raymond Sidders, Instructional Officer Grade II, Ministry of Defence.
- Roger Silver, Labourer, Ministry of Defence.
- James Marr Davison Sim, Vehicle Mechanic, Ministry of Defence.
- Edward Simpson, Coach Trimmer, Ministry of Defence.
- John Simpson, Bricklayer, Property Services Agency.
- John Skinner, Officer (Dog Handler) HM Prison, Long Lartin, Home Office.
- Mrs.June Frances Norah Small, Administrative Officer, Ministry of Defence.
- Sydney George Smallacombe, Shipwright, Ministry of Defence..
- Mrs Agnes Frame Smethurst, Administrative Assistant, Ministry of Defence.
- Alfred Charles Smith, Shipwright, Ministry of Defence.
- Mrs Betty Irene Smith, General Hand (Superior Duties), Ministry of Defence.
- Brian David Smith, Foreman B & CE, Property Services Agency.
- Cyril James Smith, Administrative Assistant, Ministry of Defence.
- David Boley Smith, Progressman Planner Technical, Ministry of Defence.
- Donald Alfred Smith, General Fitter, Ministry of Defence.
- Mrs Dorothy May Smith, Labourer, Ministry of Defence.
- Gordon Ronald Desmond Smith, Civilian Workman HM Prison Leyhill, Home Office.
- Mrs Margaret Smith, Support Grade Band I Government Telephonist, Ministry of Defence.
- Miss Mary Cecilia Smith, Administrative Assistant, Ministry of Defence.
- Peter Gerald Smith, Radio Technician, Government Communications Headquarters.
- Peter Hayden Smith, Higher Instructional Officer, Ministry of Defence.
- Ronald George Smith, Driver, Ministry of Defence.
- Ronnie Smith, Senior Trades Officer, Home Office.
- Victor Smith, Radio Officer, Government Communications Headquarters.
- Ambrose William Smoker, Senior Technician, London Telecommunications Region, General Post Office.
- Edward Snowden, Officer, HM Prison Frankland, Home Office.
- Mrs Julia Snyder, Administrative Officer, Department of Employment.
- Yau-Chan So, Postman, Hong Kong.
- Mrs Audrey Ellen Soames, Typist, Ministry of Defence.
- Peter Sollom, Senior Storekeeper, Ministry of Defence.
- John William Borthwick Soutter, Chargehand Driver/Handyperson, Scottish Office.
- George William Sparke, Driver Passenger Vehicles, Ministry of Defence.
- Michael John Wade Spencely, Fitter/Mechanical, Property Services Agency.
- Miss Margaret Jean Spiers, Administrative Assistant, Ministry of Defence.
- David Gareth Springer, Skilled Labourer, Ministry of Defence.
- James Sprott, Foreman, Property Services Agency.
- Richard Henry Spurgeon, Mess Hand, Ministry of Defence.
- Charles Eyers Squire, Wiring Duties (Superior), Ministry of Defence.
- Christopher William Leonard Stacey, Storeman, HM Prison Dartmoor, Home Office.
- Aubrey Standing, Equipment Examiner, Ministry of Defence.
- George Mackie Steel, SGB 2 (Paperkeeper), Scottish Office.
- Mrs Gwendoline Emily Stent, Administrative Officer, Department of Employment.
- Gwynn Frederick Stephens, Storekeeper, Ministry of Defence.
- Reginald Leslie John Stephens, Shipwright, Ministry of Defence.
- Ronald Maurice Stephens, Professional and Technology Officer C, Ministry of Defence.
- Mrs Peggy Eileen Stevenson, Administrative Officer, Ministry of Defence.
- Alexander Stewart, Leading Engine Room Rating, Ministry of Defence.
- Charles Alexander Stewart, Radio Officer, Government Communications Headquarters.
- Emmerson Stewart, Craft Auxiliary A, HM Prison Acklington, Home Office.
- John David Stott, Professional and Technology Officer, Ministry of Defence.
- Mrs Hilda Stringer, Storekeeper, Ministry of Defence.
- Thomas Wallis Stringfellow, Higher Instructional Officer.
- Maurice Suddaby, Assistant Telecommunications Technical Officer, Ministry of Defence.
- Spencer Sunderland, Principal Officer, HM Prison Albany, Home Office.
- John Francis Sutherland, Storeman, HM Prison, Pentonville, Home Office.
- Melvin Lionel Sutton, Foreman, Property Services Agency
- Dennis Reginald Swan, Electrician, Property Services Agency.
- William Dale Swan, Officer (Physical Education Instructor) HM Prison Wellingborough, Home Office.
- James William Swinbourne, Local Officer, Department of Social Security.
- Winston John Sword, Titular, Insulator, Ministry of Defence.
- Mrs Doris Winifred Swyer, Administrative Officer, Ministry of Defence.
- Ian Edward Tanner, Administrative Officer, Ministry of Defence.
- George Edmund Tapscott, Skilled Labourer, Ministry of Defence.
- Victor Arnold Tarrant, Storeman, Property Services Agency.
- Ronald James Tates, Senior Storeman, Property Services Agency.
- Mrs Barbara Madge Taylor, Typist, Norcross, Department of Social Security.
- Brinley Taylor, Stores Officer Grade C, Her Majesty's Stationery Office.
- David John Taylor, Machine Grinder, Her Majesty's Stationery Office.
- Robert Taylor, Telecommunications Technical Officer II, Government Communications Headquarters.
- Walter Francis Taylor, Driller, Property Services Agency.
- William Edward Taylor, Carpenter/Joiner, Property Services Agency.
- Mrs Vera Illett Terry, Typist Midlands RO, Department of Social Security.
- Geoffrey George Henry Thomas, Fitter Turner, Ministry of Defence.
- Kenneth William Thomas, Examiner I, Ministry of Defence.
- Robert James Powell-Thomas, Instructional Officer I, Ministry of Defence.
- William James Thomas, Progressman Planner Technical, Ministry of Defence.
- Albert Allan Thompson, Professional and Technology Officer, Ministry of Defence.
- John Thompson, Engineering Plant Operator, Property Services Agency.
- Ronald Wesley Thompson, Fork Lift Truck Operator, Ministry of Defence.
- Ronald Percy Thorner, Craftsman, Ministry of Defence.
- Ronald Arthur Thorpe, Plant Attendant, Property Services Agency.
- Arthur Harold Tidby, Cable Joiner, Property Services Agency.
- Charles Edward Tiller, Electrical Fitter, Property Services Agency.
- Allen Charles Timms, Professional and Technology Officer M, Ministry of Defence.
- Brian Alexander Tollett, Painter, Ministry of Defence.
- Terence Tomlinson, Skilled Labourer, Ministry of Defence.
- Frederick Tonkin, Plumber, Property Services Agency.
- Miss Violet Hilda Tooke, Administrative Officer, Ministry of Defence.
- Mrs Liliana Angela Tooley, Administrative Officer, Foreign and Commonwealth Office.
- Mrs Jean Mary Townsend, Steward II, Ministry of Defence.
- John Desmond Trafford, Stores Officer Grade D, Ministry of Defence.
- Anthony Charles Trivett, Professional and Technology Officer, Ministry of Defence.
- Sydney Samuel Trotman, Stores Officer, Horseferry House, Home Office.
- Ronald James Trott, BEM, Craftsman Engraver, Ministry of Defence.
- Mrs Moyra Troup, Typist, Ministry of Defence.
- David John Tuck, Storekeeping Assistant Grade I, Ministry of Defence.
- Trevor Donald Turnbull, Tractor Driver, Ministry of Defence.
- Alan Keith Morton Turner, Process and General Supervisory Grade D, Ministry of Defence.
- Eric George Turner, Plant Attendant, HM Prison Pucklechurch, Home Office.
- Ernest Donald Turner, Process and General Supervisory Grade D, Ministry of Defence.
- Geoffrey Charles Turner, Engineering Plant Operator II, Property Services Agency.
- Hugh Edward George Turner, Test Driver A, Ministry of Defence.
- Reginald Arthur Turner, Instructional Officer Grade I, Ministry of Defence.
- Mrs Norah Esther Twomey, Typist, Ministry of Defence.
- George James Underdown, Farm Foreman HM Prison Blundeston, Home Office.
- Frederick Roland Underwood, Support Manager III, Her Majesty's Treasury.
- George Urquhart, Stoker B, Property Services Agency.
- Ronald Edward Usher, General Foreman, Property Services Agency.
- John James Vallely, Specialist A Plant Operator, Department of Agriculture, Northern Ireland Civil Service.
- Brian Vallor, Able Seaman, Ministry of Defence.
- John Vasey, Plasterer, Property Services Agency.
- Miss Teresa Eleanor Vella, Cleaner, Property Services Agency.
- Alan James Vince, Stores Officer Grade 'C, Ministry of Defence.
- Albert Vincent, Chargehand Groundsman, Property Services Agency.
- Mrs Patricia Maureen Vintis, Administrative Officer, NBD (FSB), Department of Social Security.
- Derrick Wilfred Douglas Vivian, Foreman M&E, Property Services Agency.
- George Frederick Waddington, Painter/Decorator HM Young Offender Institution Wetherby, Home Office.
- Norman John Waite, Groundsman, Property Services Agency.
- Denis Dawson Wake, Station Radio Officer, Government Communications Headquarters.
- John Walker, Skilled Horticultural Worker, Northern Ireland Office Department of Agriculture.
- Mervyn Raymond Walker, Radio Officer, Government Communications Headquarters.
- Dudley Charles Wall, Foreman, Property Services Agency.
- Derek Wallington, Process and General Supervisory Grade D, Ministry of Defence.
- Anthony John Walsh, Administrative Officer, Ministry of Defence.
- Eric Charles Walsh, Officer Instructor, Home Office.
- Dennis Walters, Chargehand Joiner, Ministry of Defence.
- Mrs Jean Walters, Government Telephonist, Ministry of Defence.
- Ernest Walton, Support Grade Band I, Ministry of Defence.
- Ronald William Walton, Administrative Officer, Department of Trade and Industry.
- Thomas Wanley, Officer, HM Prison Durham, Home Office.
- Jack Robert Ward, Professional and Technology Officer, Ministry of Defence.
- James Ward, Labourer, Ministry of Defence.
- Sylvester Albert Thomas Ward, Officer, HM Prison Lewes, Home Office
- Charles Henry Wareham, Skilled Labourer, Ministry of Defence.
- Alexander James Wares, Foreman, Property Services Agency.
- Douglas Albert Watson, Fire Patrolman, Ministry of Defence.
- Ronald Mackie Watson, Radio Officer, Government Communications Headquarters.
- William Harold Watson, BEM, Process and General Supervisory Grade C, Ministry of Defence.
- Edward George William Watts, Fitter Turner, Ministry of Defence.
- Gordon Donald Wearne, Craft Auxiliary Worker B, Property Services Agency.
- Alfred Anthony Webb, Fitter, Steventon Supply and Transport Store, Home Office.
- Dennis Roger Webber, Assistant Painter, Ministry of Defence.
- George Wells, Administrative Officer, Ministry of Defence.
- William Thomas Wells, Carpenter, Ministry of Defence.
- Malcolm Clive West, Electrical Fitter, Ministry of Defence.
- Edward John Wheeler, Stores Officer Grade C, Ministry of Defence.
- Clifford John White, Higher Instructional Officer, Ministry of Defence.
- James Frederick White, Stores Assistant I, Ministry of Defence.
- Kenneth Edward White, Able Seaman Special, Ministry of Defence.
- Joseph Leonard Whittaker, Electrician Chargehand, Ministry of Defence.
- Donald George Wickenden, BEM, Process and General Supervisory Grade D, Ministry of Defence.
- Arthur Henry Wicks, Senior Storeman, Property Services Agency.
- James Frederick Cecil Wigg, Fitter, M&E, Property Services Agency.
- James Craig Scott Wightman, Stores Office Grade D, Ministry of Defence.
- Douglas Patrick Wilcox, Motor Transport Driver, Ministry of Defence.
- Ronald Thomas Wilkes, Senior Officer, HM Prison Risley, Home Office.
- John Lawrence Wilkie, Principal Officer, HM Prison Durham.
- Clarence Ernest Williams, Fitter Turner, Ministry of Defence.
- Donald Williams, Fork Lift Truck Operator, Ministry of Defence.
- Miss Jane Williams, Steward II, Ministry of Defence.
- John Richard Williams, Steward I, Ministry of Defence.
- Leslie Arthur Williams, Craft Auxiliary Worker 'B', Property Services Agency.
- Mrs Marguerite May Williams, Administrative Officer, Ministry of Defence.
- Maurice Roy Williams, Painter, Property Services Agency.
- Norman Desmond Williams, Machinist, Ministry of Defence.
- Owen Williams, Maintenance Electrician Telephone, Ministry of Defence.
- Thomas Addison Williams, Principal Officer, HM Prison Gartree, Home Office
- William John Baker Williams, Painter, Property Services Agency.
- Mrs Doreen Williamson, Administrative Assistant, Department of Social Security.
- Edwin Samuel Williamson, Chargehand M&E, Property Services Agency.
- John Edward Williamsom, Electrician, Property Services Agency.
- Dennis Ron Willis, Simonds Hoist Driver, Property Services Agency.
- Mrs Marjorie Wills, Administrative Officer, Ministry of Defence.
- David John Wilson, Shipwright, Ministry of Defence.
- Edward Peter Wilson, Senior Officer HM Prison Wayland, Home Office.
- Elizabeth Ann Wilson, Local Officer, Hornchurch, Department of Social Security.
- Henry Wilson, Temperature Recorder, Ministry of Defence.
- John Harold Wilson, Gardener/Groundsman I, Property Services Agency.
- Maurice Reginald George Wilson, Mason, Ministry of Defence.
- Norman William Wilson, Process and General Supervisory, Grade E, Ministry of Defence.
- Robert Bearpark Wilson, Joiner, Ministry of Defence.
- Stanley Johnstone Wilson, Craftsman Ordinary, Ministry of Defence.
- Colin Richard James Wiltshire, Shipwright, Ministry of Defence.
- Derek William Wiltshire, Craftsman, Ministry of Defence.
- Wallace Edward Wiltshire, Patrolman, Ministry of Defence.
- Fred Winter, Electrician, Property Services Agency.
- John Christopher Wintour, Skilled Labourer, Ministry of Defence.
- Ernest Valente Wishart, Process and General Supervisory Grade D, Ministry of Defence.
- William Stephen Withall, Craft Auxiliary Worker 'B ', Property Services Agency.
- Frederick Joseph Wood, Professional and Technology Officer C, Ministry of Defence.
- Gordon Charles Wood, Station Radio Officer, Government Communications Headquarters.
- Mrs Maureen Wood, Personal Secretary, Home Office.
- Michael William Wood, Officer, HM Prison, Dorchester, Home Office.
- Robert Arthur Wood, Driller, Ministry of Defence.
- Lewis Rodney Woodhouse, Chargehand M&E, Property Services Agency.
- Frank Wooding, Senior Storekeeper, Ministry of Defence.
- Michael Joseph Woodman, Professional and Technology Officer, Ministry of Defence.
- John Edmond Woodroffe, Craftsman Special, Ministry of Defence.
- Michael David Woodthorpe, Progressman Planner Technical, Ministry of Defence.
- Esmond Paul Wordsell, Storekeeper, Ministry of Defence.
- Miss Margaret Ann Worsfold, Administrative Officer, Passport Office London, Home Office.
- Wilfred Stuart Worth, Senior Officer, HM Prison Risley, Home Office.
- Dennis Alan Wright, Administrative Officer, Ministry of Defence.
- Mrs Eileen Wright, Local Officer II, Department of Social Security.
- John Thomas Wright, Craftsman I, Ministry of Defence.
- Miss Maureen Wright, Administrative Officer, Ministry of Defence.
- Raymond Charles Wright, Electro Plater, Ministry of Defence.
- Robert Wright, Fireman, Ministry of Defence.
- Ronald Alexander Wright, Telephonist, Widnes ILO, NWRO, Department of Social Security.
- Frederick Daniel David Wyeth, Motor Transport Driver, Ministry of Defence.
- Dennis Clifford Wyndham, Electrician, Ministry of Defence.
- Brian Claude Wynn, Boilermaker, Ministry of Defence.
- Michael Alan Wynne, Fitter, Property Services Agency.
- Robert Thomas Yabsley, Labourer, Property Services Agency.
- Paul Anthony Yard, Electrical Fitter, Ministry of Defence.

== Distinguished Service Cross (DSC) ==
- Commander Richard Jeffrey Ibbotson, Royal Navy.
- Lieutenant Commander David Lionel Harold Livingstone, Royal Navy.
- Lieutenant Stephen Michael Marshall, Royal Navy.
- Lieutenant Phillip David Needham, Royal Navy.
- Lieutenant Commander Michael Scott Pearey, Royal Navy.
- Commander Philip Lawrence Wilcocks, Royal Navy.
- Lieutenant Anthony Peter Williams, Royal Navy.

=== Royal Red Cross ===
==== Members of the Royal Red Cross (RRC) ====
- Lieutenant Colonel Eric Ernest Gruber Von Arni, ARRC (498378), Royal Army Medical Corps.

==== Associates of the Royal Red Cross (ARRC) ====
- Captain David Charles Bates (529182), Royal Army Medical Corps.
- Captain Ruth Margaret Boulton (519057), Queen Alexandra's Royal Army Nursing Corps.
- Chief Nursing Officer Gillian Margaret Comrie, Queen Alexandra's Royal Naval Nursing Service.
- Captain Kevin Payant (516271), Royal Army Medical Corps.
- Captain Agnes Caldwell Smith (525561), Queen Alexandra's Royal Army Nursing Corps (Territorial Army).
- Major Marie Watson, T.D. (503362), Queen Alexandra's Royal Army Nursing Corps (Territorial Army).

== Military Cross (MC) ==
- Lieutenant Anthony Guy Briselden (520464), The Royal Regiment of Fusiliers.
- Major Simon James Knapper, MBE (499735), The Staffordshire Regiment (The Prince of Wales's).
- Captain (Acting Major) Vincent James Tobias Maddison (507057), The Queen's Royal Irish Hussars.
- Major John Potter (509149), The Royal Highland Fusiliers (Princess Margaret's Own Glasgow and Ayrshire Regiment).
- Major John Matthew Rochelle (499763), The Staffordshire Regiment (The Prince of Wales's).
- Captain Norman Graeme Scott Soutar (508898), The Royal Scots (The Royal Regiment).
- Second Lieutenant Richard Edmund Telfer (531931), The Royal Scots Dragoon Guards (Carabiniers and Greys).

== Distinguished Flying Cross (DFC) ==
- Squadron Leader William Norman Browne (4233461), Royal Air Force.
- Squadron Leader Gordon Christopher Aisthorpe Buckley (8026920), Royal Air Force.
- Squadron Leader Richard Frank Garwood (8027437), Royal Air Force.
- Squadron Leader Michael Andrew Gordon MBE (2625943), Royal Air Force.
- Squadron Leader Robert Ian McAlpine (8019097), Royal Air Force.
- Squadron Leader Douglas Elliot Moule (8027675), Royal Air Force.
- Wing Commander George William Pixton, .C (8018671), Royal Air Force.
- Flying Officer Malcolm David Rainier (8029095), Royal Air Force.
- Squadron Leader Nigel Leslie Risdale (5204585), Royal Air Force.
- Flight Lieutenant Brian Geoffrey Marcel Robinson (8025013), Royal Air Force.
- Flight Lieutenant Edward David Smith (8026779), Royal Air Force.

== Air Force Cross (AFC) ==
- Wing Commander Jerome Connolly (8025592), Royal Air Force.
- Squadron Leader David John Griffiths (0609231), Royal Air Force.
- Wing Commander Robert Gordon Henderson, (M84444), Royal New Zealand Air Force.
- Wing Commander Richard Vaughan Morris (8024988), Royal Air Force.
- Wing Commander Andrew Ernest Neal (4335764), Royal Air Force.
- Lieutenant Commander Peter Whitfield Nelson, Royal Australian Navy.
- Lieutenant Carl Dominic Phelan (S27632), Army Air Corps.
- Group Captain Geoffrey Dennis Simpson (0608893), Royal Air Force.
- Squadron Leader Brian Richard Withers (4232931), Royal Air Force.

== Distinguished Conduct Medal (DCM) ==
- 4495443 Staff Sergeant Kevin Michael Davies, Corps of Royal Military Police.

== Conspicuous Gallantry Medal (CGM) ==
- Chief Petty Officer (Diver) Philip John Hammond, Royal Navy, D138513P.

== George Medal (GM) ==
- Major Mark Blatherwick, MBE (489174), Royal Army Ordnance Corps.
- Captain Keith Mollison, (516386) Royal Army Ordnance Corps.

== Distinguished Service Medal (DSM) ==
- Acting Petty Officer (Diver) Richard John Peake, Royal Navy, D152966X.
- Acting Petty Officer (Diver) Andrew Seabrook, Royal Navy, D194020L.

== Military Medal (MM) ==
- 24416774 Corporal Kenneth Anderson, The Royal Scots Dragoon Guards (Carabiniers and Greys).
- 4569348 Corporal David Edwin Denbury, Corps of Royal Engineers serving with the Special Air Service Group.
- 24762822 Lance Corporal Ian Michael Dewsnap, Corps of Royal Engineers.
- 24418181 Sergeant Michael James Dowling, Corps of Royal Electrical and Mechanical Engineers.
- 24780087 Private Thomas Robertson Gow, The Royal Scots (The Royal Regiment).
- 24738278 Acting Lance Corporal Kevin Robert Gray, Scots Guards.
- 24751995 Lance Corporal Kevin Melvin Simon Reid, Corps of Royal Electrical and Mechanical Engineers.
- 24358846 Sergeant Nicholas Mark Scott, The Queen's Royal Irish Hussars.

== Air Force Medal (AFM) ==
- Master Air Loadmaster Grant Travis Harold Mindon Roberts, (U85877), Royal New Zealand Air Force.
- 4322774 Staff Sergeant (now Warrant Officer Class 2) Mark William Torpy, Army Air Corps.

== British Empire Medal (BEM) ==
Ribbon bar of the British Empire Medal (Civil)

Bar to the British Empire Medal

- Chief Petty Officer Air Engineering Artificer (WL) Anthony Paul Dunn, BEM, D067124U.

Navy Department

- Wren Radio Operator First Class Lorna Jean Adlington, W139095W.
- Charge Chief Petty Officer Air Engineering Artificer (WL) Philip Austen D098726U
- Communication Yeoman Herbert William Baker D144477H.
- Chief Petty Officer Weapon Engineering Mechanic (O) Stephen Charles Bell D143402K.
- Royal Fleet Auxiliary Chief Petty Officer (Deck) Michael Caley R897229.
- Chief Petty Officer Air Engineering Artificer (M) Stanley Arthur Charles D056068V.
- Chief Petty Officer Air Engineering Artificer (M) Peter John Fairey F977976Y.
- Steward Douglas Goulding, Royal Fleet Auxiliary R410549.
- Chief Petty Officer (Mine Warfare) Thomas Paul Harmer D107476S.
- Stores Officer Grade C John James Henderson, Royal Fleet Auxiliary 235937G.
- Radio Supervisor Mark Anthony Philip Hoare D137570A.
- Petty Officer Stores Accountant Stuart James Lamond D176092N.
- Chief Radio Supervisor Michael McKeever D974672D.
- Chief Petty Officer Weapon Engineering Artificer (WD) Martin John McMillan D112068G.
- Charge Chief Marine Artificer (M) John Henry Morgan D110765X.
- Chief Petty Officer (MW) Worthlyn Anthony Mulrain D167089J.
- Chief Petty Officer (Operations) (Missile) Eric Ronald Nutt D100362E.
- Chief Petty Officer Air Engineering Artificer (M) Kenneth John Olerenshaw D138889P.
- Chief Petty Officer Weapon Engineering Artificer John Blair Paterson D129823L.
- Chief Petty Officer Aircrewman Reginald Norman Sharland D102293T.
- Chief Petty Officer Marine Engineering Artificer (M) Michael Lawrence Suggitt D121651M.
- Acting Leading Radio Operator (General) Mark Stewart Thurston D202030A.
- Chief Petty Officer Air Engineering Artificer (R) Kenneth Lyn Watkins D135669J.

Army Department

- 24395270 Sergeant Clifford Christiano, Abraham, Corps of Royal Engineers.
- 24317545 Staff Sergeant Richard Charles Acott, QGM, Intelligence Corps.
- 24354571 Staff Sergeant John Leslie Andrews, Royal Corps of Signals.
- 24553907 Staff Sergeant Philip Douglas Andrews, Intelligence Corps.
- 4354541 Staff Sergeant Kevin John Bailey, Royal Corps of Signals.
- Air Trooper (now Acting Lance Corporal) Thomas James Bailey, Army Air Corps.
- 24165163 Staff Sergeant Raymond Bailie, Royal Army Ordnance Corps.
- 24193116 Sergeant Edward George Band, Royal Regiment of Artillery
- 24511890 Sergeant Stephen Alan Bardsley, The Parachute Regiment.
- 24673314 Corporal Richard William Barlow, Royal Army Ordnance Corps
- 24422015 Staff Sergeant Stephen Wayne Barlow, Royal Army Ordnance Corps
- 24437768Staff Sergeant Stephen Bateman, Corps of Royal Electrical and Mechanical Engineers
- 24552597 Staff Sergeant Geoffrey Philip Beastall, Intelligence Corps (Territorial Army)
- 24585837 Lance Sergeant John Belshaw, Scots Guards.
- 24102259 Staff Sergeant Peter McGovern McKinley Beveridge, Royal Regiment of Artillery.
- 24688415 Corporal Simon David Bennett, Royal Corps of Transport.
- 24195155 Staff Sergeant John George Bincliffe, Royal Corps of Signals.
- W0476602 Corporal Wendy Jane Blacklock, Women's Royal Army Corps.
- 24397709 Sergeant Peter Michael Boon, Royal Corps of Signals.
- 24505085 Staff Sergeant Paul Simon John Bright, Intelligence Corps.
- 24583099 Corporal Murray Paul Brown, Army Catering Corps.
- 24686148 Corporal Craig Bruce, Royal Corps of Signals.
- LS 23535288 Staff Sergeant Kenneth George Burkes, The Cheshire Regiment.
- 24689783 Lance Corporal Rex John Butt, Army Air Corps
- 24627477 Lance Corporal Andrew Butterill, Royal Corps of Transport
- 24483809 Corporal Robert Canavan, Royal Corps of Transport.
- 24587818 Lance Corporal Stephen Douglas Alexander Carcill, Corps of Royal Engineers.
- 24493033 Corporal Timothy Robert Coloring, Royal Tank Regiment.
- 24783807 Corporal Mark Edward Compson, Royal Army Ordnance Corps.
- 24502728 Sergeant Anthony John Cork, Corps of Royal Engineers.
- 24311132 Sergeant David John Cotter, Royal Regiment of Artillery.
- 24627558 Corporal Peter James Crabb, Royal Corps of Transport.
- 24687216 Sergeant Anthony Stephen Davies, Royal Army Ordnance Corps.
- 24144035 Lance Corporal Harold Philip Dawson, The Royal Hussars (Price of Wales's Own).
- 24270955 Sergeant Roger Charles Dicken, Corps of Royal Engineers.
- 24689428 Lance Corporal John Anthony Edwards, Royal Army Ordnance Corps.
- W0470199 Sergeant Stephanie Elizabeth Edwards, Women's Royal Army Corps.
- Staff Sergeant Andrew Lyndon Flower, Corps of Royal Electrical and Mechanical Engineers.
- W0806151 Corporal Jennifer Polly Ford, Women's Royal Army Corps.
- WO465894 Staff Sergeant Shirley Fryer, Women's Royal Army Corps.
- 24470545Sergeant Andrew Gabbitas, Army Catering Corps.
- 247923232 Lance Corporal Peter Charles Gibbons, Royal Corps of Signals.
- 24156172 Staff Sergeant Robert Gregory, Army Catering Corps.
- 24582029 Corporal Barry Hamilton, The Ulster Defence Regiment.
- 24437558 Corporal James David Harvey, Royal Corps of Signals.
- 24519448 Corporal Jeffrey Owen Hawker, Corps of Royal Electrical and Mechanical Engineers.
- 24479662 Staff Sergeant Geoffrey Bernard Hawkins, Royal Corps of Signals.
- 24285827 Sergeant Keith Rodney Hibbins, Royal Corps of Signals.
- Acting Warrant Officer Class 2 Bernard Higgins, Queen's Own Highlanders (Seaforth and Camerons)
- 24461262 Staff Sergeant Bruce James Hitchings, Queen's Own Highlanders (Seaforth and Camerons)
- 24501057 Sergeant David Hood, Royal Army Ordnance Corps.
- 24362704 Sergeant (Acting Staff Sergeant) Peter Timothy Hornett, The Parachute Regiment.
- 24354966 Staff Sergeant Paul Anthony Horton, Royal Corps of Signals.
- 24393474 Sergeant Bryan Robert Hutcheson, The Royal Scots Dragoon Guards (Carabiniers and Greys).
- 24301721 Corporal Robert James Irwin, The Ulster Defence Regiment.
- 24607419 Sergeant Gavin Michael Jones, Intelligence Corps.
- 24509346 Sergeant Michael Dennis Kelly, Royal Corps of Signals.
- 24311900 Bombardier Stephen Leslie Kelly, Royal Regiment of Artillery.
- 24285599 Corporal Ernest Kelsall, The Royal Regiment of Fusiliers.
- 24433078 Corporal Malcolm George Lee-Bennett, Royal Army Ordnance Corps.
- 24030769 Sergeant John Walker Letford, Royal Corps of Signals.
- 24402856 Staff Sergeant Keith James Lorimer, Royal Regiment of Artillery,
- 24618157 Corporal (now Acting Sergeant) Vincent Edward McNaught, Royal Corps of Signals.
- 24694185 Sergeant Andrew John Lowe, Royal Army Ordnance Corps.
- 24585466 Staff Sergeant Donald Gilchrist Maclarty, Royal Army Medical Corps.
- 24529950 Staff Sergeant Gavin Macpherson, Royal Corps of Transport.
- 24502189 Lance Corporal Brian Godfrey Mallaney, Royal Corps of Transport.
- 24536284 Corporal Jonathan Lome Mathias, Royal Army Ordnance Corps.
- 24743732 Lance Corporal Colin Hunter McLuckie, Corps of Royal Engineers.
- 24722638 Lance Corporal (now Acting Corporal) Simon Nicholas Meadowcroft, Royal Corps of Signals.
- 24383009 Staff Sergeant Derek William John Mitchell, Royal Regiment of Artillery.
- 24267025 Staff Sergeant Thomas Mitchell, Royal Corps of Transport.
- 24592154 Sergeant Andrew John Anthony Moffatt, Royal Army Ordnance Corps.
- 24383057 Sergeant Terence Leslie Morgan, Royal Army Ordnance Corps.
- 24418129 Staff Sergeant David Morrison, Corps of Royal Electrical and Mechanical Engineers.
- 24697189 Lance Corporal Robert Mundell, Royal Corps of Signals.
- 24151918 Sergeant Leslie Murray, Corps of Royal Electrical and Mechanical Engineers.
- 24386261 Sergeant Andrew O'Malley, The Royal Irish Rangers (27th (Inniskilling) 83rd and 87th).
- 24267824 Staff Sergeant Donald Panton, Army Catering Corps.
- 24269331 Staff Sergeant Thomas Parker, Corps of Royal Engineers.
- 24511324 Staff Sergeant Gary Stuart Pearce, Intelligence Corps.
- 24437903 Staff Sergeant (Acting Warrant Officer Class 2) Anthony Michael Phillips, Army Catering Corps.
- 24030547 Staff Sergeant Jan Peter Radford, Army Air Corps.
- 24444488 Staff Sergeant Eric Anthony Ratcliffe, Corps of Royal Engineers.
- 24545746 Corporal Grant Ross Rennie, Royal Corps of Transport.
- WO466438 Sergeant Diana Richardson, Women's Royal Army Corps.
- 24354828 Staff Sergeant Paul Richardson, Royal Corps of Signals.
- 24307866 Staff Sergeant Ian Patrick Roberts, Corps of Royal Electrical and Mechanical Engineers.
- 24492699 Sergeant Graeme Donald Robertson, Royal Army Ordnance Corps.
- 24323656 Sergeant Norman Howden Robertson, The Royal Scots Dragoon Guards (Carabiniers and Greys).
- 24355420 Sergeant Ian Henry Robinson, The Staffordshire Regiment (The Prince of Wales's).
- 24151531 Staff Sergeant Keith Robinson, Corps of Royal Electrical and Mechanical Engineers.
- 24451588 Corporal Edmund Shaun Russell, Corps of Royal Electrical and Mechanical Engineers.
- 24340817 Staff Sergeant Allan Salkeld, Corps of Royal Military Police.
- 24451150 Sergeant Kevin John Salter, Corps of Royal Electrical and Mechanical Engineers.
- 24167910 Sergeant Michael John Sandall, Regiment of Artillery.
- 24503442 Corporal Christopher Bryan Sawrey, The Staffordshire Regiment (The Prince of Wales's).
- 24719731 Lance Corporal David Gerrard Sayers, Corps of Royal Engineers.
- 24208366 Staff Sergeant Alfred Slater, Ulster Defence Regiment.
- 24536733 Corporal Russell Jonathan Speed, Corps of Royal Electrical and Mechanical Engineers.
- 24425123 Staff Sergeant Colin Roy Stables, Corps of Royal Engineers.
- 24332335 Sergeant Nigel Stapleton, Corps of Royal Engineers.
- 24396663 Staff Sergeant Graham Stitt Stewart, Corps of Royal Electrical and Mechanical Engineers.
- 24063000 Corporal John Charles Stone, Royal Army Ordnance Corps.
- 24190803 Sergeant Lewis Michael Stratford, Corps of Royal Electrical and Mechanical Engineers.
- 24190843 Sergeant Brian Charles Talbot, Corps of Royal Electrical and Mechanical Engineers.
- 24590269 Corporal John Mark Tate, Royal Army Medical Corps.
- 24270817 Staff Sergeant Kenneth Tindale, Corps of Royal Engineers.
- 24441417 Sergeant Donald Allen Trainer, Grenadier Guards.
- 24256059 Staff Sergeant Stephen Charles Trower, 16th/5th The Queen's Royal Lancers.
- 24243602 Corporal (Acting Sergeant) Gary Leslie Venables, Corps of Royal Engineers.
- 24330959 Sergeant Clive Ward, Royal Corps of Transport.
- 24510001 Sergeant (now Staff Sergeant) David Kjell Ian Ward, The Parachute Regiment.
- 24519219 Staff Sergeant Richard William Wells, Corps of Royal Electrical and Mechanical Engineers.
- 24463893 Sergeant Stephen Hartley Whitehouse, Royal Army Ordnance Corps.
- 24248875 Staff Sergeant David William Wilkinson, Royal Army Ordnance Corps.
- 24328013 Sergeant Peter Willey, Corps of Royal Engineers.
- 24157912 Sergeant Roger James Craven Williams, Corps of Royal Engineers.
- 24509816 Corporal Terry Adrian Wootton, Ulster Defence Regiment
- 24362958 Sergeant Stephen Edward Wright, Corps of Royal Engineers.

Air Force Department

- P8012022 Flight Sergeant Roger Francis Alderman, Royal Air Force.
- T8013111 Sergeant John Allan, Royal Air Force. (Q8118275)
- Sergeant David Assenti, Royal Air Force.
- C8007571 Flight Sergeant Peter Bickley, Royal Air Force.
- R8013602 Chief Technician David John Butler, Royal Air Force.
- (L8078034) Chief Technician Michael Butler-Jones, Royal Air Force.
- (S8012339) Chief Technician Michael Windsor Callingham, Royal Air Force.
- L8012235 Sergeant John Michael Stuart Cundy, Royal Air Force.
- L8095399 Chief Technician David Robert Dickson, Royal Air Force.
- T8015669 Chief Technician Paul Robert Freeman, Royal Air Force.
- T8095364 Sergeant John Hulme, Royal Air Force.
- L8012154 Flight Sergeant Barrie George Hunt, Royal Air Force.
- (T4286517) Warrant Officer David Allan Johnstone, Royal Air Force.
- (F8082603) Chief Technician Patrick Jones, Royal Air Force.
- B0688691 Flight Sergeant Paul Kenneth Kettle, Royal Air Force.
- Yl934299 Chief Technician David George Lewis, Royal Air Force.
- T8192023 Corporal Steven John Longmoor, Royal Air Force.
- Q0594915 Flight Sergeant Raymond William Manghan, Royal Air Force.
- (H8001114) Sergeant Robert James McBey, Royal Air Force.
- (N4251171) Flight Sergeant James Douglas McDowell, Royal Air Force.
- (G8123220) Sergeant Kevin McHugh, Royal Air Force.
- (C1960251) Flight Sergeant James Joseph McKee, Royal Air Force.
- E8084059 Sergeant Clive Fuge Moralee, Royal Air Force.
- K8080684 Chief Technician Paul Anthony Perkins, Royal Air Force.
- A8001735 Flight Sergeant Richard John Pidduck, Royal Air Force.
- El932864 Flight Sergeant Donald Francis Pyle, Royal Air Force.
- R8010604 Sergeant Ronald Burgess Remnant, Royal Air Force.
- B8130368 Sergeant Malcolm John Scott, Royal Air Force
- S8113822 Corporal Andrew Seaton, Royal Air Force.
- J8122235 Chief Technician Adrian Peter Steele, Royal Air Force.
- J8107894 Sergeant Philip John Vicary, Royal Air Force.
- H8127053 Sergeant Alan Michael Wells, Royal Air Force.
- (R8019294) Chief Technician Vincent Elwyn Williams, Royal Air Force.
- E8125955 Chief Technician Kevin Barry Wilson, Royal Air Force.
- Flight Sergeant Mark MacDonald Harwood, (F86968), Royal New Zealand Air Force.
- Sergeant Robert Mataroa, (U90339), Royal New Zealand Air Force.

Civil Division

- Neil Adcock, Sheet Metal Worker, Royal Aerospace Establishment, Farnborough, Ministry of Defence.
- Colin Robert Andrews, Craftsman Special, Royal Armament Research and Development Establishment, Chertsey, Ministry of Defence.
- Miss Alison Bertha Baker, Personal Secretary, Foreign & Commonwealth Office.
- Randal Bannister, Freelance Engineer, Racal Survey Group.
- Kevin William Beggs, Production Supervisor, British Aerospace (Military AircraFT) Ltd.
- Nicholas Dudley Belbin, Production Manager, Westland Engineering Ltd.
- John William Busfield, Stores Officer Grade'C', Ministry of Defence.
- Florence Ellen, Mrs Clay, Catering Assistant.
- Thomas William Day, Works Manager, Pearson Engineering.
- Helen Christine, Mrs Eager, Personal Secretary, lately HM Embassy, Baghdad, Foreign and Commonwealth Office.
- Audrey Mary, Mrs Eldridge, Administrative Officer, Ministry of Defence.
- Phillip Charles Foyle, Principal Field Engineer, Marconi Command and Control Systems Ltd.
- Lorraine Beverley, Mrs Halls. For services to Service Families of the 26th Field Regiment, Royal Artillery.
- John Thomas Harrison, Head Foreman, Vickers Defence Systems Ltd.
- Maureen Teresa, Mrs Hissey. For services to Service Families of 13 Squadron, Royal Corps of Transport.
- Geoffrey Martin Holden, Manufacturing Co-ordinator, Marconi Defence Systems.
- Julie, Mrs Huyton. For services to Service Families of the 1st Battalion, The Staffordshire Regiment.
- Joan Elizabeth, Mrs Jones, Personal Secretary, Foreign and Commonwealth Office.
- Geoffrey Leaver, Stores Officer Grade ' C ', Ministry of Defence.
- Dennis Edward George Lunn, Field Engineering Supervisor, Barr and Stroud Ltd.
- Kenneth John Lynes, Foreman, Vehicle Assembly Shop, Alvis Ltd.
- Toney Gerald McRae, Stores Officer Grade 'C', Ministry of Defence.
- Michael John Moore, Welder, Royal Ordnance plc.
- William Martin Philip, Process and General Supervisory Grade ' D ', Ministry of Defence.
- Roy Thomas Poulter, Production Supervisor, Flight Refuelling Ltd.
- Stewart Allan Proctor, Supply Support Engineer, British Aerospace (Military Aircraft) Ltd.
- Miss Marjory Anne Reid, Personal Secretary, Foreign and Commonwealth Office.
- Alan Charles Riggs, Production Controller, Alan Cobham Engineering Ltd.
- Patricia Margaret, Mrs Skinner, Head Co- ordinator, Royal Air Force Bruggen Home Start.
- Margaret Elizabeth Mrs Smith, Quality Examiner, Royal Ordnance pic.
- David Stevens, Production Team Leader, Royal Ordnance plc.
- Judith Kathleen, Mrs Stocks, Temporary Administrative Officer, Ministry of Defence.
- John Philip David Thompson, Group Leader, Siemens Plessey Defence Systems.
- Graham David Worfol Senior Quality Engineer, Vickers Defence Systems.

== Queen's Gallantry Medal (QGM) ==
- 24343227 Sergeant Stephen Allen, Royal Regiment of Artillery.
- 24836235 Fusilier Simon Bakkor, The Royal Regiment of Fusiliers.
- Chi-choi Chan, Constable, Royal Hong Kong Police Force.
- Kwok-wai Cheng, Sergeant, Royal Hong Kong Police Force.
- 24344317 Corporal Michael John Driscoll, Royal Corps of Transport.
- David Foster, Constable, Sussex Police.
- Stuart Gregg, Captain, Bristow Helicopters Ltd.
- 24645371 Corporal Mark Robert Griffiths, Corps of Royal Electrical and Mechanical Engineers.
- David John Hadaway, lately Sergeant, Metropolitan Police.
- John Andrew Healy, Constable, Metropolitan Police.
- Albert Edward Howard, lately Custodian Security Express Limited.
- 2430S130 Staff Sergeant Aminul Islam, Royal Army Ordnance Corps.
- Gunther Louis Kittelmann, Dieckmann Building Company.
- Captain Richard Lewis Maybery (516017), Royal Army Ordnance Corps.
- Ronald Leslie O'Brien, Chief Instructor, Peterborough Parachute Centre.
- 24619885 Lance Corporal Paul Andrew Plant, The Royal Anglian Regiment.
- Philip Dell Rainsford, Constable, Metropolitan Police.
- Acting Captain Peter Shields (S33840) Royal Corps of Transport.
- 24683477 Corporal Andrew John Slater, The Cheshire Regiment.
- 4794602 Ranger Cyril John Smith, The Royal Irish Rangers (27th (Inniskilling) 83rd and 87th).
- Darren Smith (deceased), lately of Caerphilly, South Wales.
- 24472659 Sergeant Trevor Hugh Smith, The Royal Anglian Regiment.
- 24377805 Private William Stewart Speers, The Ulster Defence Regiment.
- Christopher Robert Thouless, Scientific Adviser, Kenya Wildlife Service.
- Michael John Wood, Captain, Bristow Helicopters Ltd.

== Queen's Police Medal (QPM) ==
Assistant Chief Constable Graham Stanley Edwards, Ministry of Defence Police.

== Queen's Commendation for Brave Conduct ==
- Robert Briggs, Constable, Lincolnshire Police.
- Ian George Chater, Shipyard Plater, Swan Hunters Shipbuilders, Wallsend.
- Edwin Thomas Cork, Constable, Kent County Constabulary.
- David Edward Craker, Constable, Sussex Police.
- Richard Eveleigh, Computer Manager, Addiscombe, Surrey.
- Alfred Harry Ford, Warrant Officer Class I, On Contract in the Royal Army of Oman.
- John Eric Gaunt, Sergeant, Suffolk Constabulary.
- Alistair Charles Gordon, Commander, HM Customs Cutter Venturous.
- John Albert Graham, Detective Constable, British Transport Police.
- Richard Samuel Irwin, Reserve Constable, Royal Ulster Constabulary.
- Graham Harris, Constable, Sussex Police.
- Martin John High, Building Contractor, East Preston, Sussex.
- Michael George Jessop, Constable, Sussex Police.
- 24352332 Bombardier Robert Martin, Royal Regiment of Artillery.
- Colin William McAuslan, Second in Command, HM Customs Cutter Venturous.
- James Allen Moore, Constable, Royal Ulster Constabulary
- Richard Hilary Noden, Construction Manager, Eastbourne, Sussex.
- Michael Edward Phillips, Constable, Northamptonshire Police.
- Trevor John Pickering, Stevedore, Peacehaven, East Sussex
- John Robert Priestly, Reserve Constable, Royal Ulster Constabulary.
- Jeffrey Roy Read, Constable, Lincolnshire Police.
- 4298976 Warrant Officer Class 2 Francis Nicholas Rimmer QGM, The Royal Anglian Regiment.
- Acting Petty Officer Marine Engineering Artificer Garry Paul Robins, Royal Navy, D165448H.
- Sydney James Saunders, Constable, British Transport Police.
- Peter Charles Saysell, Insurance Consultant, Purley, Surrey.
- Alistair Gordon Soutar, Second Engineer, HM Customs Cutter Venturous.
- Mark Anthony Taylor, Constable, Sussex Police.
- Michael James Wilson, Constable, Royal Ulster Constabulary.

== Queen's Commendation for Valuable Service in the Air ==
- Master Air Loadmaster Richard John Bragg (D8140974) Royal Air Force
- John Edward Heward, Purser, British Airways.
- Lieutenant Simon John Nicholson Kings, Royal Navy.
- Flight Lieutenant Robert Anthony Loynes (8010373), Royal Air Force.
- Dale Warren Moon, Captain, Bristow Helicopters Ltd.
- Nigel Ogden, Steward, British Airways.
- Simon Rogers, Steward, British Airways.
- (F8180078) Sergeant Timothy Andrew Warren, Royal Air Force.
- 24129847 Warrant Officer Class 2 Ronald Jack Watkins, Army Air Corps.
- Roger Williams, Lately Co-Pilot, Bristow Helicopters Ltd.

== Mentioned in Despatches ==
Palm of the Mentioned in Despatches

Navy Department

- Lieutenant Richard James Laurence Boswell, Royal Navy.
- Lieutenant Commander Charles Marwell Lome Clarke, Royal Navy.
- Lieutenant Commander Paul Nicholas Michael Davies, Royal Navy.
- Sergeant Stephen Alfred Dunham, Royal Marines, P033487M.
- Captain Michael Sam John Farley, Royal Fleet Auxiliary.
- Commander Colin Duport Ferbrache, OBE, Royal Navy.
- Leading Seaman (Diver) Steven Anthony Fitzjohn, D195673C.
- Sub Lieutenant Martin John Ford, Royal Navy.
- Lieutenant Guy Haywood, Royal Navy.
- Commander Anthony Leslie Horton, Royal Navy.
- Sergeant Darren Hunt, MM, Royal Marines, P035637B.
- Commander Peter Haydn Jones, Royal Navy.
- Lieutenant Nicholas James Last, Royal Navy.
- Lieutenant Paul Anthony McAlpine, Royal Navy.
- Leading Seaman (Diver) John Forsyth McFarlane, D172288C.
- Lieutenant Commander Ian McLaren, Royal Navy.
- Sergeant (now Colour Sergeant) Julian Charles Meade, Royal Marines P032089B
- Corporal (now Acting Sergeant) Jeremy Mark Merchant, Royal Marines P038781S
- Sub Lieutenant Robert James Charles Milligan, Royal Navy.
- Acting Master at Arms Patrick James Moore, 859078.
- Colour Sergeant (now Acting Lieutenant) Steve Kenneth Nicoll, Royal Marine N028447Y
- Major Barry Philip William Radford, MBE, Royal Marines.
- Able Seaman (Diver) John Steven Ravenhall, D202798P.
- Chief Petty Officer Air Engineering Artificer (M) Kevin Stephen Sargent, D183281D.
- Lieutenant Commander Michael Peter Shrives, Royal Navy.
- Lieutenant Commander Frank Leslie Smyth, Royal Navy.
- Sergeant Thomas John Swan, Royal Marines, P035237C.
- Lieutenant Colonel Jonathan James Thomson, OBE, Royal Marines.
- Corporal Martin David Tidman, Royal Marines P040706Y.
- Captain William James Walker, Royal Fleet Auxiliary.
- Lieutenant Commander Colin George Welborn, Royal Navy.

Army Department

- Colonel Stuart Grant Adlington (475089), late The Green Howards (Alexandra, Princess of Wales's Own Yorkshire Regiment).
- 24631737 Corporal Dale Robert Allen, The Royal Hampshire Regiment.
- Lieutenant Colonel Frederick James Allen, OBE (479964), The Royal Irish Rangers (27th (Inniskilling) 83rd and 87th).
- 24451418 Staff Sergeant John Atkinson, Intelligence Corps.
- 24601439 Corporal John Vernon Baglee, Royal Corps of Transport.
- Captain John Bailey, MBE (530488), Royal Army Pay Corps.
- 24196199 Warrant Officer Class 2 Roger Malcolm Barrett, Corps of Royal Engineers.
- 24823203 Kingsman David John Barton, The King's Regiment.
- 24339048 Sergeant Trevor George Bellis, Corps of Royal Electrical and Mechanical Engineers.
- 24154034 Bandsman Jeffrey Bennett, The Light Infantry.
- Captain Nicholas John Bennett (520112), Royal Army Medical Corps.
- 24652000 Corporal Nigel John Bishop, The Parachute Regiment.
- 24246156 Warrant Officer Class 2 Richard Glenn Bishop, The Parachute Regiment.
- 24484235 Sergeant Stephen Blackburn, Royal Regiment of Artillery.
- 24259492 Staff Sergeant David Anthony Bond, 16th/5th The Queen's Royal Lancers.
- Major Marcus Braithwaite-Exley (503764), Queen's Own Highlanders (Seaforth and Camerons).
- 24217967 Warrant Officer Class 2 Kevin Joseph Brennan, Corps of Royal Electrical and Mechanical Engineers.
- Major Thomas Summerville Brown (478526), Ulster Defence Regiment.
- Lieutenant Colonel Rodney William Brummitt, MBE (485194), Royal Tank Regiment.
- Major Colin Allen Bulleid (502089), The Royal Hampshire Regiment.
- 24530797 Sergeant Allan Bunyan, Scots Guards.
- Captain Edward Adam Butler (520039), The Royal Green Jackets.
- Major Gerald Nicholas Anthony Raymond Butler (501566), The Staffordshire Regiment (The Prince of Wales's).
- Major Hans Graham Carruthers (494202), The Parachute Regiment.
- 24477602 Sergeant Paul Neil Chadwick, The Royal Hampshire Regiment.
- Major Michael David Chambers (484828), The Royal Anglian Regiment.
- Lieutenant Ian Peter Channon (524273), The Parachute Regiment.
- 24090444 Staff Sergeant (Acting Warrant Officer Class 2) Ian Christie, The Parachute Regiment.
- Captain Christopher John Clayton (516576), The Worcestershire and Sherwood Foresters Regiment.
- Major Robin Cole (498251), The Parachute Regiment.
- Major Timothy Austin Coles (498252), The Black Watch (Royal Highland Regiment).
- 24283881 Warrant Officer Class 2 Michael Geoffrey Coombs, Corps of Royal Electrical and Mechanical Engineers.
- 24205129 Warrant Officer Class 2 Albert David Cooper (now deceased), Ulster Defence Regiment.
- 24469350 Sergeant Ian Copland, There Royal Scots (The Royal Regiment).
- Lieutenant Colonel Richard Paul Cousens (487468), The Light Infantry.
- 24792461 Sapper Graham Coxon, Corps of Royal Engineers.
- 24401142 Warrant Officer Class 2 Kenneth Albert Cross, Royal Army Ordnance Corps.
- Lieutenant Colonel Roderick James Croucher (487472), Corps of Royal Electrical and Mechanical Engineers.
- 24604329 Sergeant Stephen Bernard Crowfoot, Corps of Royal Engineers.
- 24818566 Lance Corporal Scott Johnston Crumley, Corps of Royal Military Police.
- 24587333 Lance Corporal (Acting Corporal) Andrew Currie, The King's Own Scottish Borderers.
- 24624165 Sergeant John Lamb Davidson, Royal Army Ordnance Corps.
- 24723126 Corporal Paul Davies, Corps of Royal Military Police.
- 24509847 Corporal (Acting Sergeant) Thomas George Davison, The Royal Regiment of Fusiliers.
- Major Anthony Paul Domeisen, MBE (486635), The Royal Anglian Regiment.
- Lieutenant Brett Alan Duxbury (533070), Army Air Corps.
- Captain Gerald Eaton (523080), The Ulster Defence Regiment.
- Major Andrew John Barkworth Edwards (494415), The Royal Hampshire Regiment.
- Lieutenant (Acting Captain) Christopher John Edwards, BEM (532253), Royal Regiment of Artillery.
- Captain Michael Harry England (522486), Royal Army Medical Corps.
- Major Robert John Eustace (500353), Army Air Corps.
- Lieutenant Colonel Paul Anthony Dennis Evans OBE (488028), Royal Corps of Transport.
- Major Paul Raymond Farrar (497688), The Parachute Regiment
- Major Dorothy Jame Murray Ferguson (523057), Royal Army Medical Corps.
- Captain Nicholas Owen Fitzgerald (515314), Royal Regiment of Artillery.
- 24478134 Warrant Officer Class 2 David Michael Forster, Royal Army Ordnance Corps (Expeditionary Forces Institute).
- 24627560 Corporal Gary Foster, Royal Corps of Transport.
- 24565438 Lance Corporal David Freestone, The Parachute Regiment.
- 24601782 Corporal Sean William Fry, Corps of Royal Engineers.
- Major Maxwell Pearse Gandell (491700), The Parachute Regiment.
- Major Peter William Dixon Garbutt (496302), 14th/20th King's Hussars.
- Major Patrick Edward Cecil Gascoigne (491459), MBE, Scots Guards.
- 24788646 Private David Andrew Gibb, The Royal Scots (The Royal Regiment).
- 24214060 Staff Sergeant Ian James Girvin, QGM, The Parachute Regiment.
- Captain Robin Campbell Guthrie, MBE (509307), Corps of Royal Engineers.
- Lieutenant Colonel Jonathan Rupert Maunsell Hackett (487498), The Worcestershire and Sherwood Foresters Regiment.
- 24632912 Private Michael Thomas Hallahan, The Parachute Regiment.
- Captain David Gordon Halstead (515987), Royal Corps of Signals.
- 24540523 Trooper Ian Andrew Hammond, The Queen's Royal Irish Hussars.
- Major Lewis Gustav Hammond, Intelligence Corps.
- Lieutenant (Acting Captain) Mark Russell Hanscomb (522383), The Royal Hampshire Regiment.
- Lieutenant Colonel Michael Anthony Hart, MBE, QGM (482752), The Cheshire Regiment.
- 24507126 Corporal Neil Hartshorne, The Light Infantry.
- Major Stephen Michael Haskins (519986), Corps of Royal Military Police.
- 24494418 Staff Sergeant Mark Charles Henry, Royal Army Ordnance Corps.
- Captain James Lifford Hewitt (505268), The Life Guards.
- Lieutenant (Acting Captain) Anthony Hood (529520), 5th Royal Inniskilling Dragoon Guards.
- Lieutenant James Frederick Horton (527810), The 16th/5th Queen's Royal Lancers.
- Lieutenant Colonel Alwin Richard Edward Hutchinson (485754), Corps of Royal Engineers.
- Captain Iain Stuart James (509182), Corps of Royal Engineers.
- Lieutenant John Philip Harold Patience Jeffcock (531000), Coldstream Guards.
- 24759967 Lance Corporal Alistair Robert Jemson, The King's Regiment.
- Major Christopher John Joynson (508203), The Staffordshire Regiment (The Prince of Wales's).
- Lieutenant Colonel (Acting Colonel) John Christopher Law King, MBE (488456), The Prince of Wales's Own Regiment of Yorkshire.
- 24425665 Bandsman (Acting Lance Corporal) Paul David Lawson, The Light Infantry.
- 24502752 Sergeant James Edward Leach, Corps of Royal Engineers.
- Major Gary Lee (505092), The Ulster Defence Regiment.
- Lieutenant Colonel Nicholas Patrick Chad Lewis, MBE (484897), The Light Infantry.
- 24511609 Sergeant Nigel Lihou, The Royal Hampshire Regiment.
- Lieutenant Colonel (Acting Colonel) Louis Patrick Lillywhite, MBE (486287), Royal Army Medical Corps.
- 24839125 Sergeant David Livingstone, The Parachute Regiment.
- Major Roger Charles Lloyd-Williams (502452), The Light Infantry.
- 24142969 Warrant Officer Class 2 Alan John Loftus, Intelligence Corps.
- 24165155 Warrant Officer Class 2 John William Lymm, Intelligence Corps.
- 24554158 Private Ian Mair, The Light Infantry.
- 24639966 Corporal Roderick Ian Manson, Corps of Royal Military Police.
- Major James Harry Marment (498280), Royal Regiment of Artillery.
- Major John Michael May (484910), Royal Corps of Transport.
- 24159378 Sergeant John Martin McCauley, Ulster Defence Regiment.
- Lieutenant Angus Roderick McLeod (518389), The Royal Scots (The Royal Regiment).
- Captain (Acting Major) William Crawford McMaster (526776), The Gordon Highlanders.
- Lieutenant Colonel Iain Henderson McNeil, OBE (489564), Coldstream Guards.
- 24515020 Warrant Officer Class 2 Paul Milnes, Royal Army Ordnance Corps.
- Lieutenant Colonel Seymour Hector Russell Hale Monro (489567), Queen's Own Highlanders (Seaforth and Camerons).
- Lieutenant (Acting Captain) Alasdair Derek Murdoch (523399), The Queen's Royal Irish Hussars.
- 24499894 Corporal Keith Hugh Murray, The Royal Scots Dragoon Guards (Carabiniers and Greys).
- Lieutenant (Acting Captain) Paul Terrence Myring (535418), Royal Army Ordnance Corps.
- 24502110 Sergeant Francis Andrew Nelson, Corps of Royal Engineers.
- Major Stuart William Norman (498968), The Worcestershire and Sherwood Foresters Regiment.
- Major Keith Alistair Oliver (499948), The Light Infantry.
- 24716681 Lance Corporal Douglas Orr, Corps of Royal Electrical and Mechanical Engineers.
- Captain Richard Robert Johnston Orr (507506), Intelligence Corps.
- 21162614 Corporal Parsad Gurung, Gurkha Transport Regiment.
- 24571802 Private Nicholas Anthony Pisano, The Parachute Regiment.
- 24256510 Sergeant Stephen Joseph Prendergast, 16th/5th The Queen's Royal Lancers.
- Lieutenant Colonel Christopher Edward Price (483815), The Gordon Highlanders.
- Captain Martin John Prodger (523581), Royal Corps of Signals.
- Lieutenant Colonel Nicholas Guy Quarrelle (487569), Royal Regiment of Artillery.
- Major Richard Neville Brayley Quicke (491518), 13th/18th Royal Hussars (Queen Mary's Own).
- Major Knud Peter Mark Ravnkilde (510179), The Royal Scots Dragoon Guards (Carabiniers and Greys).
- 24258386 Sergeant (Acting Staff Sergeant) Brian John Rennie, The Gordon Highlanders.
- Captain (Acting Major) Roland Gerald Rickcord (507526), 16th/5th The Queen's Royal Lancers.
- Major Roderick Michael Riddell (496375), The Black Watch (Royal Highland Regiment).
- 24093991 Warrant Officer Class 2 Kevin Riley, The Parachute Regiment.
- 24107547 Sergeant Paul Grossart Robb, The Gordon Highlanders.
- Second Lieutenant Andrew Taylor Rule (533108), The Royal Highland Fusiliers (Princess Margaret's Own Glasgow and Ayrshire Regiment).
- Major Reginald Mark Rusby (499766), The Staffordshire Regiment (The Prince of Wales's).
- Major Robert Paul Russell (502910), The Royal Hampshire Regiment.
- Major Robin Gerald Russell (503917), The Royal Irish Rangers (27th (Inniskilling) 83rd and 87th).
- 24795085 Private Stuart Paul Savage, The Staffordshire Regiment (The Prince of Wales's).
- 24491326 Sergeant Paul Scott, The Parachute Regiment
- Major Christopher Michael Sexton (503054), Corps of Royal Engineers.
- Captain Robert Alan Sharp (511903), Royal Corps of Signals.
- 24205394 Private Robert Ivan Sheridan, The Ulster Defence Regiment.
- 23968162 Warrant Officer Class 2 Charles Christopher Sherlock, Army Air Corps.
- Major Stephen Frederick Sherry, (506486) Corps of Royal Engineers.
- Major (now Lieutenant Colonel) Andrew John Newman Simkins (495233), Army Air Corps.
- 24393086 Sergeant Leslie Simm, Intelligence Corps.
- Colonel Keith Skempton (487055), Late The Cheshire Regiment.
- Major Charles Patrick Carnegie Sloan, MBE (502912), The Gordon Highlanders.
- Captain (Acting Major) Roderick Stenhouse Small (508238), Corps of Royal Engineers.
- 24707871 Lance Corporal (now Corporal) Michael Edward Smith, The Worcestershire and Sherwood Foresters Regiment.
- 24488968 Sergeant Martin Christopher Stalker, The Staffordshire Regiment (The Prince of Wales's).
- 24460638 Sergeant Peter Stanworth, The Parachute Regiment
- Captain Mark Steed (514647), The Staffordshire Regiment (The Prince of Wales's).
- 24236742 Staff Sergeant David Stevenson, The Queen's Royal Irish Hussars.
- Lieutenant Charles William Edward Stoner (524379), Coldstream Guards.
- Captain Adrian Michael Stratta (519010), The Parachute Regiment.
- 24248502 Staff Sergeant Alistair Sutherland, Queen's Own Highlanders (Seaforth and Camerons).
- 24584231 Lance Corporal Neil Swithenbank, Royal Corps of Signals.
- Lieutenant Colonel Alan Taylor (487591), Royal Army Ordnance Corps.
- Captain Alan Phillip Taylor, (509582) Corps of Royal Engineers.
- 24026475 Staff Sergeant Robert Anthony Taylor, The Parachute Regiment Regiment.
- 24362410 Warrant Officer Class 2 Christopher Gordon Teeling, Corps of Royal Engineers.
- Lieutenant Colonel Stephen Francis Thornton (478109), Royal Army Ordnance Corps.
- Major Eric John Tomlinson (508930), Corps of Royal Electrical and Mechanical Engineers.
- Major Edward Patrick Tracy, (504978) The Prince of Wales's Own Regiment of Yorkshire.
- 24507242 Corporal William Brian Tyson, The Royal Green Jackets.
- Brigadier David John Venn, OBE (470165), Late Intelligence Corps.
- Captain Jonathon Armigel Wade, (509197) The Royal Highland Fusiliers (Princess Margaret's Own Glasgow and Ayrshire Regiment).
- Major John Robert Wallace, MBE (503638), Royal Corps of Transport.
- Lieutenant Colonel Michael Charles Wardley (489613), Intelligence Corps.
- 24468053 Corporal David Brian Weaver, The King's Regiment.
- 24626504 Sergeant (Acting Staff Sergeant) Robert John Wells, The Royal Hampshire Regiment.
- Lieutenant Colonel Ian Philip White (482245), Army Air Corps.
- 24851353 Private Lee Winston Wolland, The Royal Hampshire Regiment.
- 24247173 Sergeant Michael Edward Wojnicz, Royal Regiment of Artillery.
- Captain Richard Graham Wootton (518669), The Staffordshire Regiment (The Prince of Wales's).
- Lieutenant Robert William Yorke (529600), Coldstream Guards.
- Lieutenant Richard Peter Young (527397), Corps of Royal Engineers.
- 24441517 Corporal John Edward Yourston, The Parachute Regiment.

Air Force Department

- Flight Lieutenant Kevin John Baldwin (8117164).
- Flight Lieutenant David William Bellamy (8028225), Royal Air Force.
- Flight Lieutenant William Paul Bohill (5203681), Royal Air Force.
- Flight Lieutenant Alastair William Douglas Craig (5205824), Royal Air Force.
- Squadron Leader James William Crowley (8024909), Royal Air Force.
- Flight Lieutenant Andrew Gerald Dakin (2621405), Royal Air Force.
- Sergeant Anthony Ian Day (Q8122194), Royal Air Force Regiment.
- Flight Lieutenant Christopher Charles Drewery (8028110), Royal Air Force.
- Wing Commander Ivor Evans (4233285), Royal Air Force.
- Squadron Leader Philip Anthony Evans (8026051), Royal Air Force.
- Flight Lieutenant Peter Alan Fenlon-Smith (8027275), Royal Air Force.
- Flight Lieutenant Richard Charles Haley (2626924), Royal Air Force.
- Flight Lieutenant Rodney Leon Hawkins (4233241), Royal Air Force.
- Flight Lieutenant Craig Russell Hill (8028720), Royal Air Force.
- Flight Lieutenant Andrew Neil McLaughlin (5203747), Royal Air Force.
- Flight Lieutenant Glenn Macey (8141201), Royal Air Force.
- Flight Lieutenant Glenn Mason (8027862), Royal Air Force.
- Squadron Leader Herbert Ellis Newton (5202263), Royal Air Force.
- Squadron Leader Richard Alfred Pittaway (4233344), Royal Air Force.
- Flight Lieutenant Christopher Charles Purkiss (5203278), Royal Air Force.
- Flight Lieutenant Trevor John Roche (5203271), Royal Air Force.
- Flight Lieutenant James William Ross (8026729), Royal Air Force.
- Flight Lieutenant Thomas Gavin Stuart Rowley (8028853), Royal Air Force.
- Flying Officer Jeremy James Spencer (8029077), Royal Air Force.
- Flight Lieutenant Peter John Tholen (8027521), Royal Air Force.
- Flight Lieutenant Stephen Richard Thomas (8027264), Royal Air Force.

== Order of St John ==
=== Bailiff Grand Cross of the Order of St John ===
- Professor Anthony Roger Mellows TD PhD LLD.
- Sir John Mclntosh Young AC KCMG.
- Colonel Sir Cennydd George Traherne KG TD.

=== Dame Grand Cross of the Order of St John ===
- Mrs Margaret Boothman MBE.
- Dr Marguerite Wylie.

=== Knight of the Order of St John ===
- Peter Alwyn-Smith MB BS MRCS FRCP FFCM
- Douglas George Badham CBE JP FCA
- Elvet Roy Eaton
- Robert James Griffith
- Lieutenant Colonel Sir Michael Rowland Godfrey Llewellyn Bt JP
- John Edwin Lloyd MB BCh
- Mervyn Thomas Alfred Syvret BEM
- Robert Hugh Duncan
- Kevin Anthony J Smith
- Grenville Richard Francis Tompkins
- Dr Anthony John Blowers CBE JP
- Cleon White MBChB FFOM DIH
- Charles Henry Gordon Bowes MBBS
- Harold Bridges OBE
- Arthur Llewellyn Lloyd OBE JP MB ChB MRCS LRCP
- Leonard Chiu Kung Phoo
- David Graham-Wood
- Christopher George Sneath FCA
- Air Marshal Sir Laurence Jones KCB AFC
- Sir Andrew George Buchanan Bt.
- Ian Charles Hugh Moody.
- Gerald Cavendish Grosvenor, The Duke of Westminster, DL.
- John Renshaw Holt, JP
- His Honour the Honourable Gordon Towers.
- His Majesty King Mswati III
- Sir Brian Garton Jenkins GBE.

=== Associate Knight of the Order of St John ===
- J Gary Burkhead
- William Morrison Matthews
- James David Murphy;
- Richard Carlton Seaver.

=== Sub-Prelate of the Order of St John ===
- The Most Reverend Dr P F Carnley.

=== Associate Sub-Prelate of the Order of St John ===
- The Right Reverend Ronald Hayward Haines DD.

=== Dame of the Order of St John ===
- Jean Christina, Miss Evans SRN SCM HV
- Daphne Elizabeth, Mrs Bluett
- Marie Isobel, The Countess Cathcart
- Mrs Jean May Hodge SRN
- The Right Honourable Margaret Thatcher OM FRS MP
- Her Excellency The Honourable Dame Roma Flinders Mitchell AC DBE
- Marina Ann, Mrs Dolman
- Jean Winifred, Miss Adams
- Diana Mary, Miss Dixon, DL
- Blanche Ann, Mrs Taylor
- Eileen Margaret, Mrs Johnstone.

=== Associate Dame of the Order of St John ===
- Katherine Riegel
- Mrs German H H Emory
- Mrs Melissa Meyers Gibbs
- Mrs Elizabeth W Leicester Van Leer

=== Commander (Brother) of the Order of St John ===
- Thomas Leonard Hurst.
- Major General Peter John Beale QHP BA MB BChir FRCP MFCM.
- Dr Li Fook Kuen, Henry QBE JP MB BS.
- Jovan William Mabudo Kiryabwire LMS MB ChB FRCS FRCS(Ed).
- Robert James Berry.
- Gordon Creak.
- David Thomas Daniel JP.
- Keith Melville Dunn, MITD.
- Cyril Edgar Evans MIOSH MIIRSM.
- Gerald William Henry Kent AMIRTE.
- Major Robert Harold Medley.
- Robert William Roberts GM.
- Lieutenant Colonel Robert Louis Spurrel OBE.
- William John Stokes.
- Martin Thomas OBE JP DL.
- David Wilmer Dykes MA PhD FSA FRHistS.
- Richard Ellis Meuric Rees CBE JP FRAgs.
- Gerrard Keith Boulter.
- David Charles Stewart Haggle.
- Thomas William Home.
- Joseph Alfred Homer.
- John Clydesdale Joliffe.
- Colin G Knowles.
- George John Lankester.
- Brian Darlington Quigley.
- Trevor Hollebon.
- Ivan Leonard Morton.
- Eric William Winslade.
- Colonel Michael William McCorkell.
- Edward Bostock CBE MA FCA.
- Edward Arthur Fisher.
- Denis Robert Keirle.
- Seamus Patrick Kelly.
- Montague Morris Levy.
- Sir John Albert Dellow CBE.
- Alan George Feaver MSSCh MBChA.
- Ronald Alfred Bertrand Wiggins.
- Colin William Andrew McLeod.
- Douglas George Palmer.
- Paul Jeremy Burton.
- Bernard John Ord.
- Lieutenant Colonel Frederick Phillips TD DL.
- Sir Denis Thatcher Bt MBE TD.
- Clement Joseph Ryan.
- Anthony Charles Widdrington Lee.
- Brigadier Robin Charles Middleton, OBE.
- Surgeon Captain (D) Noel Park Littlefield, VRD, BDS, RNR.
- Iestyn Watkin Williams, LMSSA, MRCGP, FRSM, MRSH, CAVMED.
- Robert Vernon Morris, LLB.
- Peter Reid, QFSM, BA, DP A, DPM, AMIPM, FIFireE.
- Harold Goldsbrough.
- Robert Malcolm Griffiths.
- Dr David Michael Ward, MB, ChB, FRCS.
- Dr Terence MacAlaster Corry.

=== Chaplain of the Order of St John ===
- The Revd Canon Brian David Michael Boyce.
- The Very Revd. John Dudley Galtrey Kirkham.

=== Associate Chaplain of the Order of St John ===
- The Reverend Richard Rodney Kirk.
- Gary Peter Fertig.

=== Associate Commander (Brother) of the Order of St John ===
- Balasubramaniam s/o Ganesan AMN PJK MB BS MCGP
- Tuan Haji Abdul Rahmin Bin Haji Omar
- The Hon Tengku Menteri Datuk Sen Wan Ahmad Isa Shukri B W A Rasdi
- Charles William Agneau Jr
- William Marion Barnard MD
- Marvin Barrett
- Samuel Ellison Belk III
- Theodore Frank Brunner
- Carl Frederick Dahlberg Jr
- Richard Wayne Goss II
- Harry Lee Hinson III
- Merrill Lynch Magowan
- Peter Gordon Bradley Stillman
- Kenneth Hollister Straus
- Sir John Marks Templeton
- Alfred Spalding Wilsey
- George McKee Elsey
- The Hon Joseph Verner Reed

=== Commander (Sister) of the Order of St John ===
- Mrs Audrey Joan Davies
- Miss Thelma Margaret Hatcher SRN RFN SCM SEN
- Mrs Flora Anne McDougall
- Mrs Rosemary Jayne Cadbury
- Mrs Phyllida Katherine Stewart-Roberts JP
- Mrs Joan Mildred Norton
- Mrs Irene Doris Louvain Biddle
- Mrs Eileen Doris Wheaton
- Miss Barbara May Coley

=== Associate Commander (Sister) of the Order of St John ===
- Mrs A Elizabeth Dixon Parker Bryant.
- Mrs Rhoda H Goldman.
- Miss Judith Mary Gertrude Sayers.
- Mrs Joan Waiters.
- Mrs Barbara Johnson Yarington.

=== Officer (Brother) of the Order of St John ===
- David Compton Shields MB BS MRCS LRCP MRCOG.
- John Rowe Aberdeen.
- William Houghton.
- Alan Exley OBE FRSA.
- Thomas William Smale.
- Albert William Almond.
- Peter James Grant.
- Group Captain Richard David Bates AFC.
- Derek Joseph Bridson.
- Sir John Daniel Wheeler JP DL MP.
- Surgeon Captain Ian Lawrence Jenkins FRCS.
- Commander Peter Hugh Tatham.
- Surgeon Commander Edward Howard Nigel Oakley.
- Colonel Trevor Reginald Cooper-Tydeman MBIM.
- Wing Commander Philip John Bush.
- Colonel Edward James Hewlett Moore MB ChB MF HOM MFCM.
- Colin Mackenzie Curtis MA.
- Zedekiah Etiang.
- Francis Gervase Omaswa MB ChB MMed FRCS(Ed).
- David Leslie Bowdich
- Robert George Bushell.
- Albert Charles Ellis.
- Reverend David Griffiths DipTh.
- Michael John Hawthorne CertEd.
- Elfed Morris Hughes.
- Peter Wilson James MBE RD DL.
- Alfa Maynard Lewis.
- Ivor Powell.
- Roger Frederick Prew.
- Glyn Thomas REMT.
- Leslie Robert White.
- Keith Vivian Williams FIFireE.
- Robert John Hodge ACIB.
- John Elfed Jones CBE DL CEng FIEE FRSA CBIM.
- Colonel Christopher Matthew Peterson CBE TD JP DL.
- Geoffrey Mark Philipps.
- David Alexander Withers.
- Enrol Noel Jeffrey.
- William Robert Kuscus.
- Horace Gordon Summerley.
- Grenville Eugene Thomas.
- Dr Alexander Patrick Bean.
- Nicholl Archibald Drummond Campbell.
- Daniel Guillaume Dewil.
- Brigadier Tristan Anton Dippenaar.
- Dr Michael Cornelius Greeff.
- Dr William Joseph Handcock.
- Peter Gowar Joubert.
- Charles Percy Lipp.
- Professor Robert Edward Mickel
- Denis George Paxton.
- Harry Ingram Sopper.
- Richard Hugo Terhorst.
- Mr Justice Charles James Waddington.
- Glenn Aidan Wakfer.
- Andrew Kenneth Lieshman Christie.
- Alan Everard Cotter.
- Hughan Morris Craig.
- Leslie Owen Cullerne.
- Michael Leigh Downey.
- Joseph McCormick-Wright.
- Barry John Gibbens.
- Max Hutchinson.
- Leslie David Jones.
- Derek Charles William Lang.
- Ian McLeod Lauder.
- James Hector McLachlan.
- Thomas Walter Mearns.
- John Edwin Newlands.
- Brian E Pierard.
- Alan Bruce Pine.
- Colin Preston Smith.
- Donald Leslie Sutton.
- David John Swallow.
- Kenneth James Vesey.
- Craig Daryl Scott Wombwell.
- Dr Peter Denholm Crone.
- Desmond D Dufty.
- Lieutenant Colonel James Richard Innes.
- Alastair Andrew Bernard Riebey Bruce of Crionaich.
- John Cecil Jollands.
- John Ford.
- Ronald Frederick Strutt.
- George Robert Puzey.
- Peter Butcher.
- Peter Maurice Cole.
- Alan Robert Croft.
- David John Minney.
- John Gresham Shores LMSSA.
- Keith Sandiford JP.
- David John Seeker.
- Raymond Edward Doidge.
- Eric Cumbo.
- Geoffrey Barry Smith TD MBBS FFARCS.
- Major Sydney William Nicoll MC.
- Robert Charles William Luff.
- Michael Hebden Wainwright.
- Edward Arthur William Burned FRGS FRNS MIORS MOMRS.
- Albert Leslie Gillings JP.
- Raymond Claude Pope DL.
- Sir Trevor Herbert Harry Skeet MP.
- Wing Commander David James Amy MSc BDS MODS RSC(Ed).
- Wing Commander John Jones MSc MB BCh DObstRCOG MRCPath.
- Flight Lieutenant David Leslie Hoyle.
- Sir Peter John Derham.
- John William Hughes TD BSc.
- Robert Murray.
- Peter James Faulkner DCR(R) DRI.
- Clifford Corbett Smith.
- John Wilson Walsh, BA, AdvDipEd.
- Laurence George Tarr.
- Anthony Brian Cronin.
- Jack Earwaker, FRIBA.
- Kenneth John Phillips.
- Ralph James Marshall, JP, FSCA.
- Kenneth Edward Ayers.
- David Henderson Johnston, MB, BCh, BAO, MRCGP.
- Michael Edward Bricknell, QPM.
- Thomas Pearson Frost, FCIB.
- Mention Morgan, FCA.
- Lieutenant Colonel John Charles Horatio Sprague Byrne, OBE.
- Nicholas Charlton Penrhys Bird, PICA.
- John Charlesworth Prince, FRICS.
- Ivan Noel Forder, QPM, FBIM.
- Sir Reginald Derek Henry Doyle, CBE.
- Major General Ian Patrick Crawford, GM, QHP, MRCS, LRCP, FFCM, FFOM, DPH, DIH, DTM&H.
- Lieutenant Colonel Richard David George, MB, BS, DObstRCOG
- George Bodin
- Norman Keith Ian McIver, MB, BS, MFOM, LRCP.
- Herman Emanuel Ricketts, CD, LVO.
- Colin Mackenzie Curtis, MA.
- Henry James Nedigate.
- Peter Francis Harvey.
- Julian Shaun Power Maynard.

=== Associate Officer (Brother) of the Order of St John ===
- Lam Ming Ho.
- Ahmed Gajee Khan.
- Goh Toh Yee.
- Sin Meng Heng.
- Lim Guan Swee AMN BKT JP PBB.
- Goh Siow Huat PJK; Sukarno Bin A Samad PIS.
- Robert Moss Ayers Jr.
- John Franklin Barker.
- Roger Wolcott Block.
- Philip S Boone Jr.
- Clifford Vail Brokaw III.
- Sean Peter Campbell MD.
- Denton Sayer Cox MD.
- Burnham Enerson.
- George Elliott Ewing Jr ED D.
- George C Gaines.
- Duane Leroy Charles Mealman Galles.
- William Glen Gamel MD.
- Barrett George Haik MD.
- Nicholas Halfod John Hall.
- Richard Hubbard Holland PhD.
- Byron Laburt Howard Jr MD.
- Henry Baldwin Hyde.
- John J Jones.
- Maurice Masaadi Kawashima.
- Curtis Bradbury Kellar JD.
- Fritz-Alan Korth.
- Gerard Leon MD.
- Clyde Vernon (Tripp) March HI.
- Robert Gene McKenzie.
- Charles David Peebler Jr.
- Steven Plotycia MD.
- Spencer Cone Relyea.
- Robert Armstrong Robinson PhD.
- Elliott Bowman Strauss OBE.
- Michael Scott Swisher.
- Robert John Kenneth Titley.
- A William Bourne Vincent.
- Edward McConnell Griffith.
- Michael Gordon Samuel Frampton, TD, JP.
- David Riley Pitts.

=== Sub-Chaplain of the Order of St John ===
- Canon Robert Andrew Willis.

=== Associate Sub-Chaplain of the Order of St John ===
- The Reverend Canon Harry Edward Krauss MDiv.
- The Very Reverend James Richard Leo.
- The Reverend Rex Douglas Perry.

=== Officer (Sister) of the Order of St John ===
- Mrs Felicity Frances Lewis.
- Brigadier Jill Margaret Field RRC QHNS.
- Miss Ann Patricia de Jersey SRN SCM RSCN.
- Mrs Diane Margaret Davies.
- Mrs Sandra Ann Fisher.
- Mrs Buddug Merries Hamilton.
- Miss Lynda Ann Jones.
- Mrs Margaret Elizabeth Jones.
- Mrs Suzanne Elvera Kibby BEd.
- Mrs Sandra Mary Mogridge.
- Mrs Patricia Morgan.
- Mrs Margaret Rees SRN SCM.
- Mrs Mair Eluned Richards.
- Mrs Joyce Mary Slack SRN RMN BEd.
- Susan Winifred, Lady Langford.
- Mrs Ann Frances Ridler.
- Mrs Pamela Mary Malcolm.
- Mrs Alison Mary Poole.
- Mrs Geraldine Jocelyne Stewart.
- Mrs Ruth Margrete Greeff.
- Mrs Elsie Jean Bain.
- Mrs Beverley May Bull.
- Mrs Constance Rae Crosland.
- Mrs Rosalie Jean Hawkes.
- Mrs Elaine Margaret Keown.
- Mrs Zandria Mrs Potts.
- Mrs Audrey Joan, Mrs McGuane RGN.
- Mrs Alma Winifred Williams NSCN.
- Mrs Rosamund Marjorie Watt.
- Mrs Irene Yvonne Bishop.
- Mrs Christine Willsher.
- Mrs Angela Elizabeth Brinton.
- Mrs Joyce Holbourn.
- Mrs Collette Cecilia Pickstock, MB, ChB, DObstRCOG, FRCS(Ed).
- Lady Noreen Helena Frances Milton-Thompson.
- Alexandra Anastasia, Duchess of Abercorn.
- Doris Roberta, Her Honour Mrs Towers.

=== Associate Officer (Sister) of the Order of St John ===
- Miss Lam Sau King.
- Mrs Anne Walters.
- Puan Hajjah Azizah Majid SRN.
- Janet Lee Drew, Mrs Duane W-H Arnold
- Armida Maria-Theresa Bologna, Mrs Harris D Colt
- Miriam Harriett Brown, Mrs George F Dalton
- Martha Elizabeth Cannon, Mrs Wayne Gibbens
- Martha Knox Victor, Mrs John B Glass
- Janice Lee Maxwell, Mrs Chellis Gregory
- Jane Allison, Mrs Najeeb Halaby
- Ruina Wallace, Mrs Ardon B Judd Jr; Anne Giannini
- Mrs James MeWilliams
- Violet Monser
- Mrs H Boone Porter
- Tracy Clark
- Mrs Christopher David Wells

=== Serving Brother of the Order of St John ===
- James Joseph Cork.
- Lieutenant Colonel Clifton Herbert Rayment MBE.
- Stephen Groves EN(G) RON FETC.
- Frederick Alan Spann.
- Rear Admiral Joseph Leslie Blackham CB DL.
- Eric Elston Hewinson MB ChB.
- Tom Richardson Newton.
- Ronald Alfred Labram.
- Mervyn Leslie Trowbridge.
- Peter Spooner.
- Warrant Officer Class 2 Michael David Harries.
- Professor Sir Frederick Edward Warner FEng FRS.
- Paul Victor Duckmanton.
- Innes John Mason.
- Ian Gerald Seibt.
- Richard Walter Salisbury Webber.
- Ho Hon Wing.
- Dr Leung Kei Yan, Peter.
- Yam Chung Kin.
- Lee Cheung-Shue.
- Dr Chung Yat-Ki, Benedict.
- Dr Kam Hing Wah MB BS.
- Dr Taw Jin Liam MB BS.
- Patrick John Stubbs.
- Franco Carunara BEEng.
- Stephen Paul Allen/
- Norman Browning Charles.
- Dean Kerr Clarke.
- Reverend Father Felix Connolly.
- David Glyndwr Davies.
- William Hywell Davies.
- Leslie Norman Duffield.
- Malcolm Edward Durbin.
- Reverend Keith Evans BA BEd.
- Peter Garrard CertEd.
- Henry George Gowland.
- Michael Dion Gray.
- Roger Alan Hill.
- Dan Rowland Hughes BSc MB BCh.
- Reverend Godfrey Walter James MA DipEd.
- Kevin Philip Jones BA DTS MITSA.
- Wayne Idwal Jones.
- David Marcus Lewis.
- Graham David Lewis.
- Nigel Anthony Lewis.
- Huw Lloyd.
- Hywel Wyn Lloyd BA.
- Andrew David Mitchell.
- David Lloyd Morgan.
- Henry Desmond Lawson Morgan.
- Raymond John Morgan.
- Michael Richard Edward Oxford BSc PGCE.
- John Morris Pritchard BSc FCA.
- Richard John Pritchard BA MEd.
- Robert Leonard Smith.
- Malcolm Sullivan.
- George Geoffrey Tinkler MB ChB MRCGP DObstRCOG.
- Cyril William James Walker.
- David Williams.
- John Valentine Williams.
- John Victor Williams.
- Simon Hendrik Barkhuizen.
- Brian Peter Barkley.
- Robert Allen Barton.
- Mmutlanyana Zacharia Chuenyana.
- Melato Recias Malope.
- David John Pittman.
- Paul Allan Stone.
- Mike Geoffrey Wade.
- Willem Hendrik Pretorius.
- George W Agnew.
- Robert Francis Bell.
- Ralph Bellchamber.
- Keith Graham Brown.
- Garry Edward Cantwell.
- Alan Cleave.
- John Richard Clough.
- Harry Rangihuatau Dansey.
- Ross Thomas Neil Eagle.
- Derek Bruce Erskine.
- Colin William Freeland.
- Jack Gair.
- Anthony Philip Gibbons.
- Donald Alan Harborne.
- Lance Michael Hill.
- Robert Dawson Hillyard.
- Stephen Wayne Hutchison.
- Frederick Robert Jackson.
- Peter Keys.
- Darcy Thomas Lupton.
- Garth Robert McMillan.
- Norman McTigue.
- Graham Richard Motion.
- Donald John Parker.
- David Alaister Rushworth.
- John Ashleigh Spencer.
- Dennis John Powis Turner.
- George Waamu.
- Ian Murray Webster.
- Louis Zampese.
- Stephen Patrick Cracroft-Brennan FCA.
- Dr Alan Grey Giddins.
- Robert Thomas Mitchell Henry CBE LVO QPM CPM.
- Peter Treharne Marshall.
- Colonel Leslie William Wright TD DL MA.
- Kenneth Duncan Flint.
- Colin Arthur Ford.
- Harold Edwin Robinson.
- John Anthony Simmons.
- David Eric Robinson.
- William Bridge.
- David Herring.
- Alan Frederick Jones.
- Colin Russell Needham.
- John William Price.
- Ernest Sheppard.
- Royston Mervyn Tucker.
- Charles James Brown.
- John Morven Murray.
- James William Arthur Hansford.
- Robert Mark Jaggs-Fowler MB BS MRCGP DRCOG.
- David John Locking.
- John Morton.
- Major John Kenneth Hollis.
- David Clive Lewin SRN RNT BA DipEd.
- Frank Louis Parker.
- William Herbert Richardson.
- Ronald Fernandez.
- Ralph Thomas.
- William Arthur Smedley.
- Mervyn Reginald White
- Roy Williams.
- Harry William Frank Butcher.
- Donald Scarlett.
- Ralph John Brown.
- Christopher Bryan.
- Frederick Perkins.
- Paul Cook.
- Raymond Arthur Dallaway.
- Andrew Paul Littlehales.
- John Douglas Sheppard.
- Tony White.
- Stanley Wildblood.
- Leonard Oatey.
- Colonel John Whitehill Parsons LRCP LRCS LRFPS FFCM DPH DTM&H DIH.
- Leslie Edwin Cyril Parsons.
- Thomas William Sullivan,
- John George Fenwick.
- Frederick Peter Talbot.
- Colonel Charles Terence Anthony Burgess MBE TD MB ChB FRCS.
- Walter Owen Smart.
- James Hopton Darlington.
- James Thomson Gumming.
- Herbert Frood MB ChB.
- Patrick Gordon Green LMS.
- Evan Robert Jones; Frank Howard Lockwood.
- Keith Turner.
- David John Weall.
- David Dashwood.
- John Henry Fairbank.
- David Maldwyn Thomas Kendrick.
- Paul Andrew Walker.
- Warrant Officer Peter William Myles MCSP.
- O'Carrol Alexander.
- Robert Maurice Beddoe.
- Timothy Hubert Patino.
- Thomas Cunningham McKee.
- Charles Murray.
- Superintendent George Alexander McBride MBE MBIM.
- Victor William Barley.
- David Frederick Dormer.
- Peter Alan George Morphew, GIFE, FBIM.
- Douglas Hacking, MCRS.
- Terence Reginald Mankee.
- Arthur Twiggs.
- Peter Dolan.
- Roy Crumpton.
- Stephen Dainty, BEd.
- Derek Russell Hunnisett.
- Maurice Bradford.
- George Callow Cubbon.
- Sylbert Rudder.
- Keith Roland Smith.
- Toni Spooner.
- Max Raymond Casper.
- Philip Greenslade, MA, MCIT.
- John Walter Wood.
- Gordon Montague Jones.
- Ivan Arthur Wilkes.
- Ken Fielding.
- Hugh James McMorris, QPM, BSc.
- Sergeant Philip Andrew Cox.
- Norman John Cook, MB, ChB, DCH.
- Donald Armstrong.
- Colin Clark.
- Kenneth William Moor.
- David Anthony Harper.
- James Richard Findlay.
- Walter Edmund Stone.
- Peter Fotheringham.
- Deputy Assistant Commissioner Anthony James Speed.
- Commander David Norman Stevens.
- Commander Thomas Dixon Laidlaw.
- James Michael Barker, MB, BS, MRCGP.
- Roger Bexon.
- Flight Lieutenant Nicholas Brenton Hinchcliffe.
- Thomas William Wild.
- Joseph Skinner.
- John Vincent Newsome.
- Colin Richard Steel.
- Thomas James Basil Stewart.
- Michael Shields.

=== Associate Serving Brother of the Order of St John ===
- Chiu Man-Pok, Raymond.
- Liu Sau Sang.
- Dr Lam Hoo-Tak.
- Lai Shun Hing, Sunny.
- Dr Tang Siu Tong MB BS.
- Alex Gorshel.
- Professor Milliard Solomon Hurwitz.
- Peter Trevor Kaplan.
- Encik Hashim Bin MD Said PJK PBM.
- Low Hoon Yong.
- Lee Youn Suang PPN BKT PJK PBB.
- Lee Eng Cheong PBM.
- Quek Cho Gin.
- Lee Keen Seong PJK.
- Dato Koh Thian Peng DPMJ SMJ PISAMN.
- Tan Meng Hong PJK.
- Sim Kiah Ho PJK.
- Cheong Mong Sin.
- Nalliah s/o Vellasamy.
- Yeow Kiew Meng.
- Tan Nor Hoong.
- Yeong Keat Leong.
- Lai Koon Chon.
- Loh Leong Pin.
- Teoh Ewe Hun.
- Tuan Haji Mohd Salleh Bin Haji Long PJK.
- Mamad Raffle Gukhool.
- Dhanundjaye Madhoo.

=== Serving Sister of the Order of St John ===
- Gloria Hunniford.
- Mrs Margaret Ann Barker.
- Mrs Anne Jennifer Macleod.
- Mrs Roberta Gwendoline Wegner.
- Mrs Dorothy Mavis Cooper.
- Mrs Penelope Marguerite Hodges.
- Mrs Avril Susan Hansford.
- Miss Margaret Joan Goldsmith.
- Miss Choi Mei Si Mazie.
- Miss Siu Wo Ying EN.
- Mrs Janatha Stubbs.
- Mrs Gemma Sirol.
- Mrs Patricia Gwen Attwood.
- Mrs Violet Mary Blunt BSc.
- Miss Frances Emma Jane Farley.
- Mrs Alice Doreen Flagg.
- Mrs Margaret Beryl Griffiths MMEB
- Mrs Noleen Helmore SRN ONC NCDN.
- Mrs Pamela Anne, Mrs Hughes.
- Mrs Mary Jones.
- Mrs Margaret Jane Lewes.
- Mrs Marion Ramona Lloyd.
- Mrs Margaret Gwendoline Lloyd-Williams.
- Mrs Muriel Constance Porter.
- Mrs Dilys Irene Pritchard, RGN RHV.
- Mrs Susan Rae Provis SRN SCM.
- Miss Lyn Elizabeth Shapland.
- Mrs Margaret Evans Sullivan.
- Miss Enid Ellen, Miss Abrahams.
- Mrs Isabel Arend.
- Mrs Margaret Anne Bayford.
- Mrs Norah Dorothy Glaus.
- Mrs Priscilla Henwood.
- Mrs Jennifer Ruth Holmes.
- Sister Ursula Petronella Ings.
- Mrs Kathleen Jones.
- Mrs Estelle Alice King.
- Mrs Gertruida Elizabeth McFarlane.
- Sister Aggie Mngxekeza.
- Mrs Joan Nortje.
- Miss Margaret Winifred Costhuizen.
- Mrs Margaret Robinson.
- Mrs Agnes Florence Scratchley.
- Mrs Maria Faulds Shearer.
- Mrs Winifred Anne Simpson.
- Miss Wendy Joy Wolhuter.
- Mrs Elizabeth Ellen Adams.
- Mrs Dorothy Rose Addley.
- Mrs Elizabeth Jeanne Andrews.
- Mrs Grace Elizabeth Brown.
- Mrs Sharon Cannon
- Mrs Nellie Maude Christie.
- Mrs Fay Gillespie.
- Mrs Nola Margaret Gollop.
- Mrs Lesley Eleanor Howard.
- Mrs Margaret Hursthouse.
- Miss Brenda Joy Hynes.
- Mrs Ann Frances Ladd.
- Mrs Margaret Josephine Martin.
- Miss Lesley Kay Masters.
- Mrs Lorraine Amy O'Sullivan.
- Mrs Violet Dorothy Shultz.
- Mrs Barbara Jennifer Smith.
- Ms Te Rina Sturmey.
- Mrs Elsie Stuart Sutton.
- Mrs Patience Mary Worsford.
- Mrs Valmai June Wynne.
- Miss Marjorie Helen Agnes Bateup.
- Mrs Penelope Maria Lloyd.
- Mrs Janet Anne Conner BEd.
- Mrs Patricia Frances Turner.
- Mrs Jacqueline Retallack-Hall.
- Mrs Joan Bent SRN.
- Mrs Jean Grigg RGN.
- Mrs Sheila Mildred Hill.
- Mrs Anona Fletcher.
- Mrs Janet Mary Wiggins.
- Mrs Dorothy Anne Irwin.
- Mrs Joan Evelyn Markham.
- Mrs Gisela Mayhew.
- Mrs Jane Elizabeth Kinch.
- Mrs Ethel Anne White SRN.
- Mrs Winifred Frances Pomroy SRN.
- Miss Gwenyth Rosemary Botting
- Miss Lesley Josephine Boning.
- Mrs Brenda Gladys Moss.
- Mrs Anne Rosalie Mary Carter.
- Mrs Fenella Anne Woollams.
- Mrs Lucy Daisy Le Moignan.
- Mrs Margaret Miller.
- Mrs Venetia Elsada Grant.
- Mrs Deborah Anne Price Williams MB BCh.
- Mrs Sheila Ann Schnaar.
- Mrs Barbara Edythe Booty BA.
- Mrs Hazel Ethel Knight MBE.
- Mrs Joan Mary Tidnam SEN.
- Mrs Gillian Freer.
- Mrs Gwyneth Anne Stuckey.
- Mrs Nancy Sutherland.
- Mrs Freda Hird.
- Mrs Anne Mary Brewster SRN.
- Mrs Irene Evans.
- Mrs Joan Eileen Knight SRN.
- Miss Margaret Ann Higginson.
- Mrs Doreen, Mrs Hughes.
- Miss Doris Bradburn.
- Mrs Kay Evelyn Balchin.
- Mrs Jean Grant Bannister.
- Mrs Kathleen Theresa Roots SRN.
- Mrs Susan Elizabeth Cheney.
- Mrs Evelyn Mary Singleton.
- Mrs Gillian Anne Smith.
- Mrs Ann Margaret Deacon.
- Miss Dilys Ann Hughes.
- Mrs Celia Latham Brown.
- Miss Patricia Margaret Chester.
- Mrs Janice Kathleen, Mrs Murphy.
- Mrs Megan Catherine Thomas.
- Sergeant Mary June Mann.
- Mrs Hermilou Dorothy Palmer.
- Mrs Ionie McKenny Thomas.
- Mrs Esellen Treasure.
- Mrs Irene Chong Qui.
- Mrs Barbara Forgenie.
- Ms Marjorie Eloise Ward.
- Mrs Wilma Gertrude Scott SRN.
- Mrs Dorothy Blacker.
- Mrs Sheila Sinton.
- Miss Yvone Elizabeth West RGN.
- Mrs Haynel Carnwath.
- Mrs Isobel Gamble.
- Miss Agnes Gray Taylor SRN SCM.
- Mrs Sylvia Elaine Holmes.
- Miss Elizabeth Mary Byrom Bramwell.
- Mrs Margaret Jean Lednor.
- Mrs Hazel Mary Clark.
- Mrs Sheila Heaton.
- Miss Jane Hilary Taylor.
- Mrs Margaret Bannister.
- Mrs Jane Elizabeth Barron.
- Mrs Carole Ann Allaway-Martin, SRN, RMN.
- Mrs Muriel Emma Cottier.
- Mrs Linda Mary Hoskins, SRN, OHNC.
- Mrs Julie Dorothy Carpenter.
- Mrs Rosalie Evaleen Badger Lucie-Smith, MB, ChB.

=== Associate Serving Sister of the Order of St John ===
- Miss Natalie Lee Ngar Yee, MB BS MRCP DCH
- Miss Law May Lin.
- Mrs Esther Louise Rantzen.
- Mrs Lilian Hochhauser.

=== Esquire of the Order of St John ===
- Lieutenant Colonel Timothy Corran Richard Brooke Purdon, MBE.
- The Hon Thomas Columba Shaw.
- Stephen Peter Francis Macklow-Smith,
- Gwyn Griffith.
- Murray Ingledew.
- Richard Reade.
