= Guild of Young Freemen =

Guild of the City of London

Guild of Young Freemen of the City of London
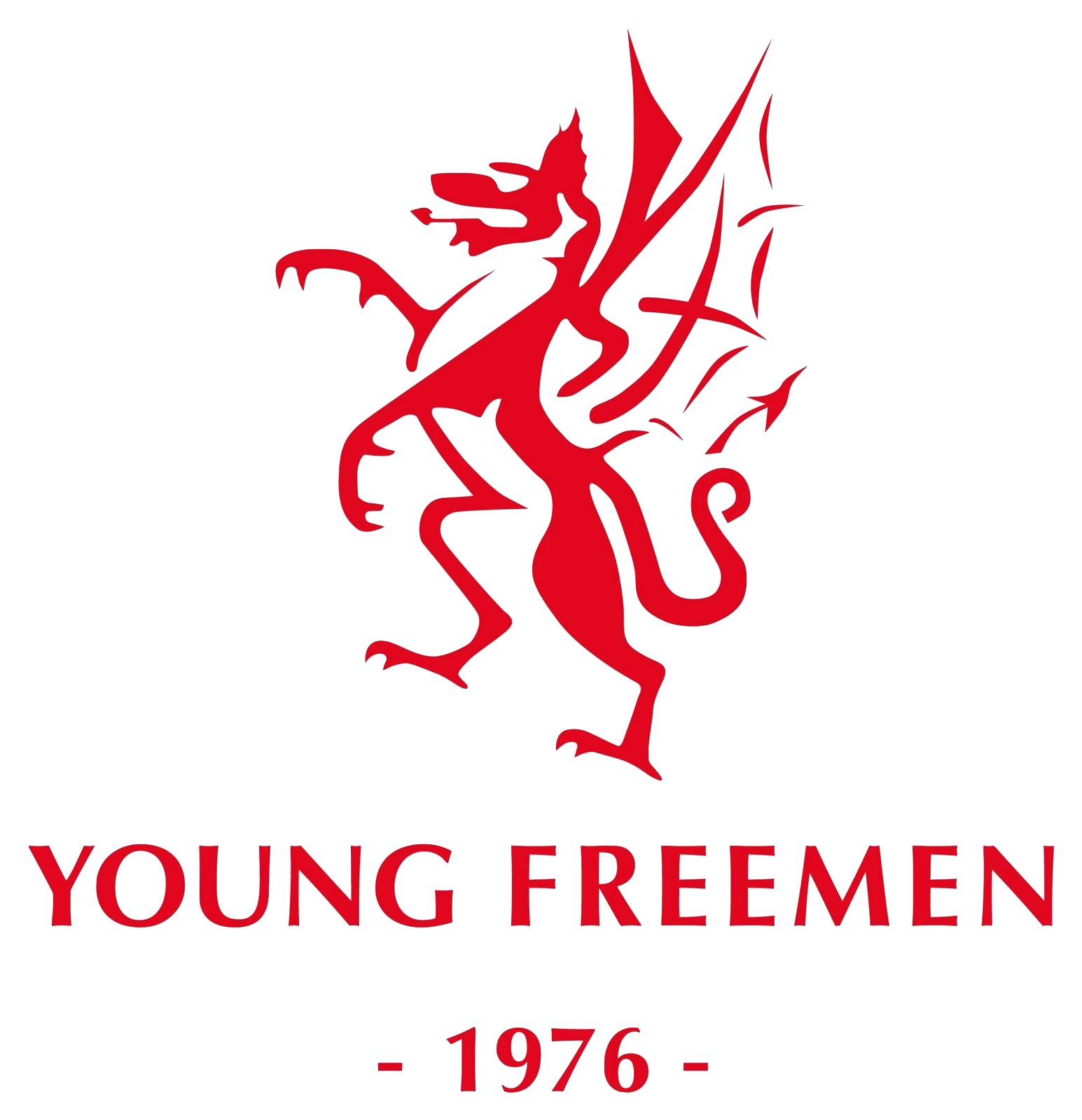
- Emblem of the Guild of Young Freemen
- Abbreviation: Guild of Young Freemen
- Formation: 7 December 1976; 49 years ago
- Founder: Sir Robin Gillett, Bt.
- Headquarters: Guildhall Yard, London
- Location: London, England, United Kingdom
- Master: Jago Toner
- Key people: William Hunt, Alderman Alastair King DL
- Affiliations: Order of St. John, St John Eye Hospital Group, London Area Sea Cadets
- Website: youngfreemen.org
- Formerly called: Society of Young Freemen of the City of London

The Guild of Young Freemen of the City of London is a membership organisation that connects young individuals associated with the traditions of the Freedom of the City in the City of London. The organisation has been partnered with the Order of Saint John since 2024.

Founded in 1976 as the society of Young Freemen of the City of London during the lord mayoralty of Sir Robin Gillett, the Guild was founded to provide a platform for young professionals to engage with the civic and historical traditions of the City. Over time, it has developed into a forum that fosters engagement with London’s heritage while supporting professional and community activities. The Guild is open to young professionals under the age of 40 and seeks to encourage greater participation in the customs and institutions of the City of London.

== History ==
=== Formation ===
In the mid-1970s, the City of London Corporation exploring ways to involve younger people in the City’s civic life and encourage them to become Freemen. Internal discussions, led by the Corporation’s Policy and Parliamentary Committee and its Public Relations Sub-Committee, highlighted the need for an organised forum for young Freemen. In 1976, a working group of five Court members of the Guild of Freemen (the association of City Freemen), together with City Corporation representatives and a number of younger Freemen, met several times to develop this idea. These early committee deliberations culminated in a proposal to create a new body specifically for young Freemen, with the support of the lord mayor and the corporation. By late 1976, the framework was in place for what was initially envisioned as a "society" of young Freemen, dedicated to engaging the next generation in the heritage and traditions of the City.

=== The Society of Young Freemen ===
The official formation of the Society of Young Freemen of the City of London took place at an inaugural meeting on 7 December 1976 at Mansion House, launched under the auspices of the then Lord Mayor, Sir Robin Gillett (who served as the society’s first patron). The society’s stated aim was "to promote an interest in and the interests of the City of London among Freemen of the City" – in practice, to increase the participation of young Freemen and Liverymen in City affairs and traditions.

Early leadership of the society was drawn from young City Freemen: June Evans served as the first chairman in 1976–1977. She was followed by William Hunt and (Margaret) "Penny" Lewis – later known as Penny Harrison, among others, who together shaped the society's direction in its formative years.

From the outset, the lord mayor agreed to act as patron of the society, and successive lord mayors continued this patronage tradition. The Society of Young Freemen quickly became active in the City's calendar: it held annual dinners and social events, arranged educational visits, and encouraged its members’ involvement in historic ceremonies. Within a few years, the society was recognised as a training ground for future Livery company members and City leaders, with several alumni later serving as livery masters, City officers, and even lord mayors.

=== The Guild of Young Freemen ===
In 2015, the society adopted the name Guild of Young Freemen to better reflect City traditions. The guild remains distinct from the older Guild of Freemen of the City of London, which was founded in 1908.

=== Current activities ===
Members of the guild regularly participate in major City events. It maintains a ceremonial role in the annual Lord Mayor's Show, where its members traditionally escort the wickerwork giants Gog and Magog through the City, in collaboration with the Worshipful Company of Basketmakers.

The guild also contributes volunteer marshals to the annual Sheep Drive across London Bridge, a charitable event organised by the Worshipful Company of Woolmen which recreates the traditional right of Freemen to drive sheep over the Thames toll-free.

In addition to its ceremonial roles, the guild hosts lectures, inter-livery networking events, and formal dinners throughout the year.

It has partnered with modern City of London livery companies such as the Worshipful Company of Information Technologists, and supported other civic activities like the Lord Mayor's Big Curry Lunch.

== Governance ==
On 28 November 2025, the Guild of Young Freemen of the City of London was incorporated as a private company limited by guarantee. The organisation’s articles of association define its objects as promoting participation in the civic affairs and traditions of the City of London and acting as an "incubator for prospective leadership." The constitution mandates that the master and wardens must be Freemen of the City of London and establishes a formal disciplinary framework, including a disciplinary court and adherence to the City of London Corporation's code of conduct.

=== WhatsApp scandal (2025–2026) ===
In late 2025, the guild came under scrutiny after allegations emerged that several members had been part of WhatsApp groups in which offensive content was shared. The court commissioned an independent inquiry within 48 hours of becoming aware of the allegations. The inquiry reported in January 2026, finding that a number of individuals had behaved in a way that fell significantly short of the guild's code of conduct, and that the guild's governance arrangements required review. Following the inquiry, none of those individuals remained members of the guild, and they were stated to be unwelcome at future activities and events.

Reuben Braden-Bell resigned as master on 21 January 2026. Michael Polak was elected to succeed him on 28 January 2026. On 5 February, Polak published a statement addressed to the City and Livery setting out four governance reforms unanimously agreed by the court: external supervision by an independent person; appointment of the guild's first paid professional clerk; a whistleblowing policy with reports made to an independent person; and a revised complaints and disciplinary procedure.

The City of London Corporation confirmed it was separately reviewing whether to ban those implicated from corporation events.

== Affiliations ==
=== Military ===
The guild like other livery companies has military affiliations, and has been involved in activities with the London Area Sea Cadets, including attendance at joint ceremonial functions.

=== Charitable ===
The guild is affiliated with international humanitarian organisations including Saint John Eye Hospital Group, and the Order of St. John.

== Notable members ==
Members of the guild have gone on to become liverymen, common councillors, and officers of City institutions.

Guild members include:

- William Hunt, Windsor Herald of Arms at the College of Arms
- Andrew Parmley, Former Lord Mayor of the City of London
- Mark Watson-Gandy, Chairman of the Biometrics and Forensic Ethics Group
- Susie Rodgers, British Paralympic swimmer
- Dhruv Patel, Common Councillor of the City of London

== List of honorary presidents ==
- SirLindsay Ring
- Sir Robin Gillett
- Sir Ronald Gardner-Thorpe
- Sir Hugh Bidwell
- Sir Brian Jenkins
- Sir Roger Corkk
- Sir Clive Martin
- Sir Michael Oliver
- Sir David Brewer
- Sir David Wootton
- Sir Andrew Parmley
- Timothy Hailes
- Alastair King

== Past Masters ==
The presiding officer of the society of Young Freemen was originally styled "President". Following the adoption of the name the Guild of Young Freemen the title "Master" was adopted.

=== Presidents and masters of the Guild of Young Freemen ===
Term	Officeholder	Notes
1976–1977	June Rodgers	
1977–1978	William Hunt	
1978–1979	Penny Lewis (later known as Penny Harrison)	
1980–1981	Richard Ratner	
1981–1982	Catherine Gay (née Wilson)	
1982–1983	John Hill	
1983–1984	Claire Cross	
1984–1985	Ken Craig	
1985–1986	Sally Anne Hill	
1986–1987	Gwilym Morgan	
1987–1988	David Foster	
1988–1989	Jonathan Gollow	
1989–1990	Howard Pearson	
1990–1991	Heather Hall (née Marshall)	
1991–1992	Peter Tompkins	
1992–1993	Ian Clark	
1993–1994	Malcolm Johnston	
1994–1995	Stephen Plumb	
1995–1996	David McGurk	
1996–1997	Piers Llewelyn Jones	
1997–1998	Michael Cooper	
1998–1999	Vicki Welch (née Hill)	
1999–2000	Fiona Donovan	
2000–2001	Ray Catt, CC	
2001–2002	Clare James, CC (née Cue)	
2002–2003	Michael Snow	
2003–2004	Nigel Hall	
2004–2005	Nigel James	
2005–2006	Jason McCreanne	
2006–2007	Robert Scriven	
2007–2008	Toby Locke	
2008–2009	Michael Wadood	
2009–2010	Georgina Hajdu	
2010–2011	Victoria Lloyd	
2011–2012	Govind Ratnam	
2012–2013	David Double	
2013–2016	Laurence Nicolas	Extended term
2016–2017	James St John Davies (né Bromiley-Davies)	
2017–2018	Omar Asfar	
2018–2019	Rafe Henry Clutton	
2019–2020	Anjola Adeniyi	
2020–2022	Louise Starling	Extended term due to the COVID-19 pandemic
2022–2023	Rhys Jones	
2023–2024	Samuel Chadd	
2024–2025	Grace Abba	
2025–2026	Reuben Braden-Bell	Resigned 21 January 2026
January 2026– June 2026	Michael Polak	
July 2026 - Present	Jago Toner	

== Guild Church ==
- St Michael's Cornhill
