= Pangbourne College =

Public school in Berkshire, England

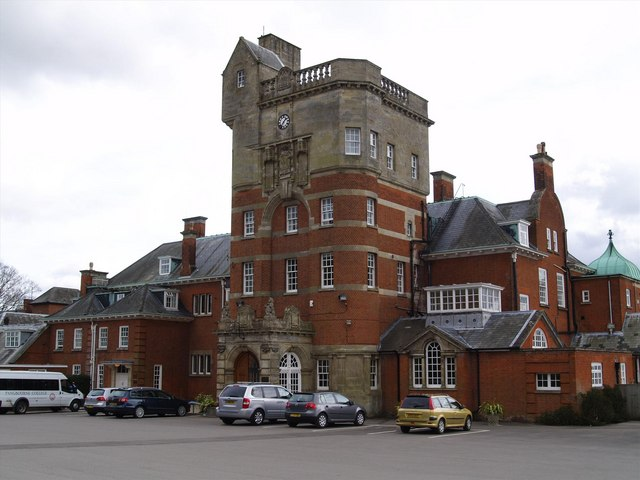
- Pangbourne, Berkshire, RG8 8LA; England

Information
- Type: Public school Private boarding school
- Motto: (in Latin) Fortiter ac fideliter ("Bravely and faithfully")
- Religious affiliation: Church of England
- Established: 1917
- Founder: Sir Thomas Lane Devitt Bt
- Chairman of Governors: Patrick Roberts, MBE
- Headmaster: Oliver Knight
- Staff: ~120
- Gender: Co-educational
- Age: 11 to 18
- Enrolment: ~467
- Houses: 7
- Colours: Red, Navy blue and white
- Publication: Pangbourne Colours; Ensign
- Former pupils: Old Pangbournians
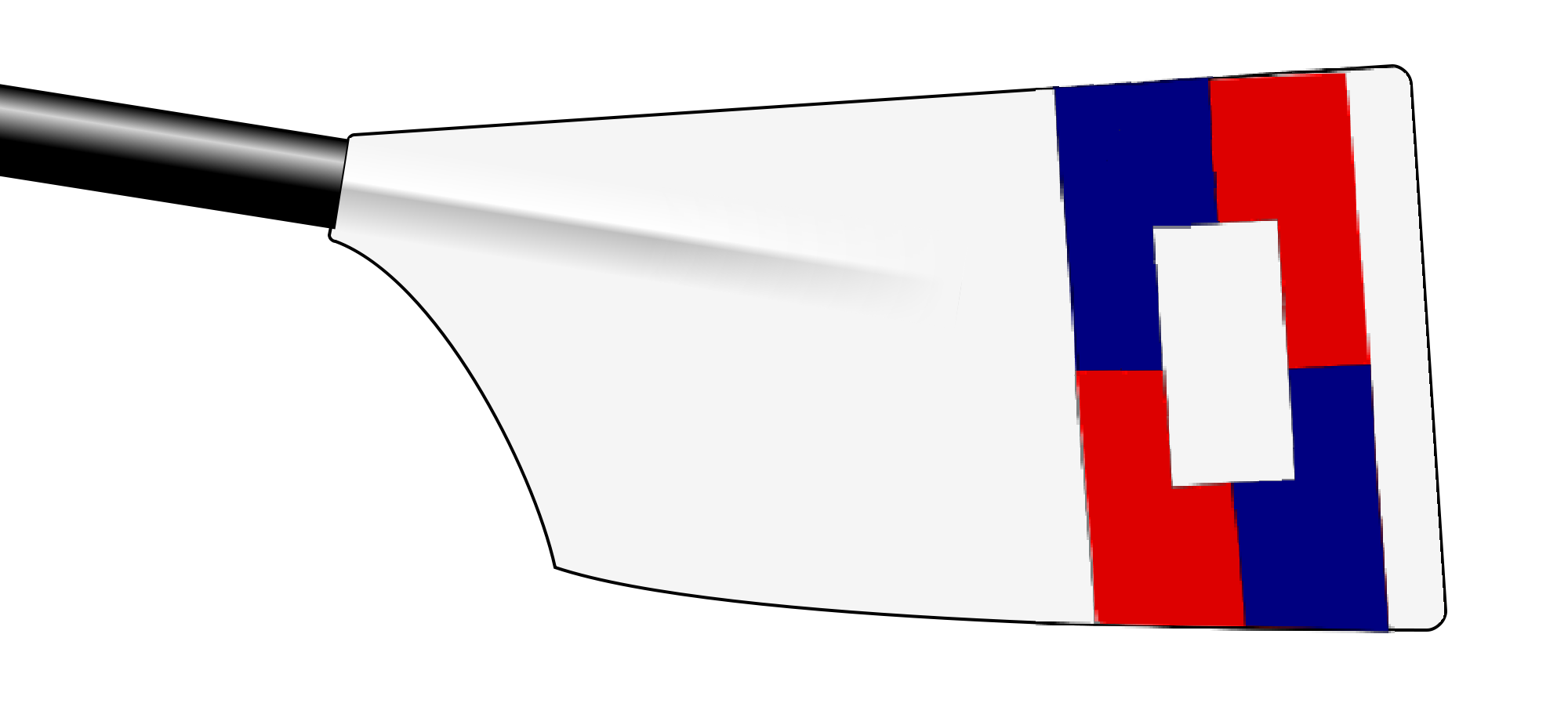
- Boat club
- Website: www.pangbourne.com

Pangbourne College is a coeducational public school (private boarding and day school), for pupils aged 13–18 years, in Pangbourne, Berkshire, England. It is set in 230 acres, on a hill south-west of the village, in an Area of Outstanding Natural Beauty.

The college was founded by Sir Thomas Lane Devitt Bt. in 1917 as The Nautical College, Pangbourne with the purpose of training boys to become Merchant Navy officers. It became "Pangbourne College" in 1969 and while conforming to the general lines of a British independent boarding school, retains a distinctly nautical flavour; the pupils wear naval uniform.

== History ==
The college was founded by Sir Thomas Lane Devitt, 1st Baronet, in 1917 as "The Nautical College, Pangbourne", on the site originally occupied by Clayesmore School, now located in Dorset. The Nautical College's purpose was to prepare boys to become officers in the Merchant Navy through his shipping company Devitt and Moore, although both he, and later his son, Sir Phillip Devitt, also wanted the boys to have a well-rounded education in case they later changed their minds about going to sea. At the time of founding the German campaign of unrestricted submarine warfare was at its height, and this was one reason for a nautical training school to be sited inland. Almost immediately after founding, the Admiralty took a keen interest, and naval uniform together with the status of cadet in the Royal Naval Reserve was awarded to every student, putting the college in line with similar schools at that time, such as HMS Worcester and HMS Conway. These last two institutions closed in 1968 and 1974 respectively as the number of young men seeking a career at sea declined, and in 1969 The Nautical College, Pangbourne became "Pangbourne College". This also saw a shift in emphasis to a stronger academic programme, and with a civilian headmaster to replace the former post of captain superintendent. Directors of studies were replaced by the post of second master. The fourth, and current, headmaster, Thomas Garnier, served in the Royal Navy before switching to a career in teaching. He taught physics and was a housemaster before becoming headmaster in 2005.

In addition to normal academic subjects, the college's curriculum included the teaching of seamanship and navigation, theoretical and practical, to O Level for all boys, and to Higher National Diploma (A Level equivalent) in Seamanship for cadets wishing to embark on a career in the Merchant Navy.

Originally catering to about 200 male "cadets" bound largely for service in the Merchant and Royal Navies, the school now has approximately 400 co-educational pupils, both day and boarding. It has a Christian ethos, takes a wide range of academic abilities and focuses on the development of the whole person, particularly including "courtesy and self-discipline", "supporting the success of others" and "aiming high". For most of its history, the college numbered on average around 200 cadets in any given year. Recently numbers have expanded to an average complement of around 400, due in part to the college becoming co-educational in 1996 and opening a junior house.

A number of naval traditions are maintained. The college holds a parade seven times a year, culminating on 'Founders Day' with the ceremony of "beat the retreat". While the title of "cadet" for pupils has fallen into disuse, pupils continue to wear naval uniform on a daily basis, including the traditional rank slides of a Royal Navy cadet. College argot reflects the nautical traditions, with "cabins" instead of study bedrooms, "gunrooms" instead of pupil common rooms, "galleys" instead of kitchens, and so on. A focus on water-borne sports, including rowing and sailing, remains a legacy of a nautical past.

== Academic ==
Pangbourne takes students with a range of academic abilities, the majority of whom enter via common entrance at 11 or 13 and a few at sixth form (16+). Subjects are taught at both GCSE and A-level.

The Good Schools Guide describes Pangbourne as "A small, distinctive, grounded and family-oriented school that puts huge emphasis on self-discipline, teamwork and leadership. Caring and supportive, Pangbourne buzzes with activity and encourages every pupil to have a go." The college has a boarding culture with around forty per-cent of the pupils boarding on a full, weekly or part-week basis. An Independent Schools Inspectorate visit in November 2019 reported the college to be "excellent" in all nine of its categories.

== Divisions ==
The boarding houses at Pangbourne are known as "divisions".

Divisions
Name	House letter(s)	House colours
Harbinger	H
Port Jackson	PJ
Macquarie	Q
Hesperus	S
Illawarra	I
St. George	SG
Dunbar*	D	n/a

*Pupils aged from 11–13 years belong to Dunbar.

All of the divisions are named after ships operated at various times by the Devitt and Moore Line, and all contain roughly 60 pupils. Every pupil at Pangbourne is allocated to a boarding house when applying to Pangbourne whether he or she is a boarder or day pupil. Pangbourne does not use the system whereby scholars live in their own separate house, but instead chooses to integrate them into regular divisions. The divisions constantly compete against each other in sports and extra-curricular activities, ranging from debating and singing to running and marching. The division which has performed best at the end of the year is presented with the coveted Headmaster's Cup on Founder's Day. Each division is staffed by a housemaster or housemistress, assistant housemaster or mistress, a matron, and a number of house tutors. In addition to these, each division has a chief, one or more deputy chiefs, and a new entry cadet officer drawn from among the senior pupils.

== Extracurricular activities ==
=== Sport ===
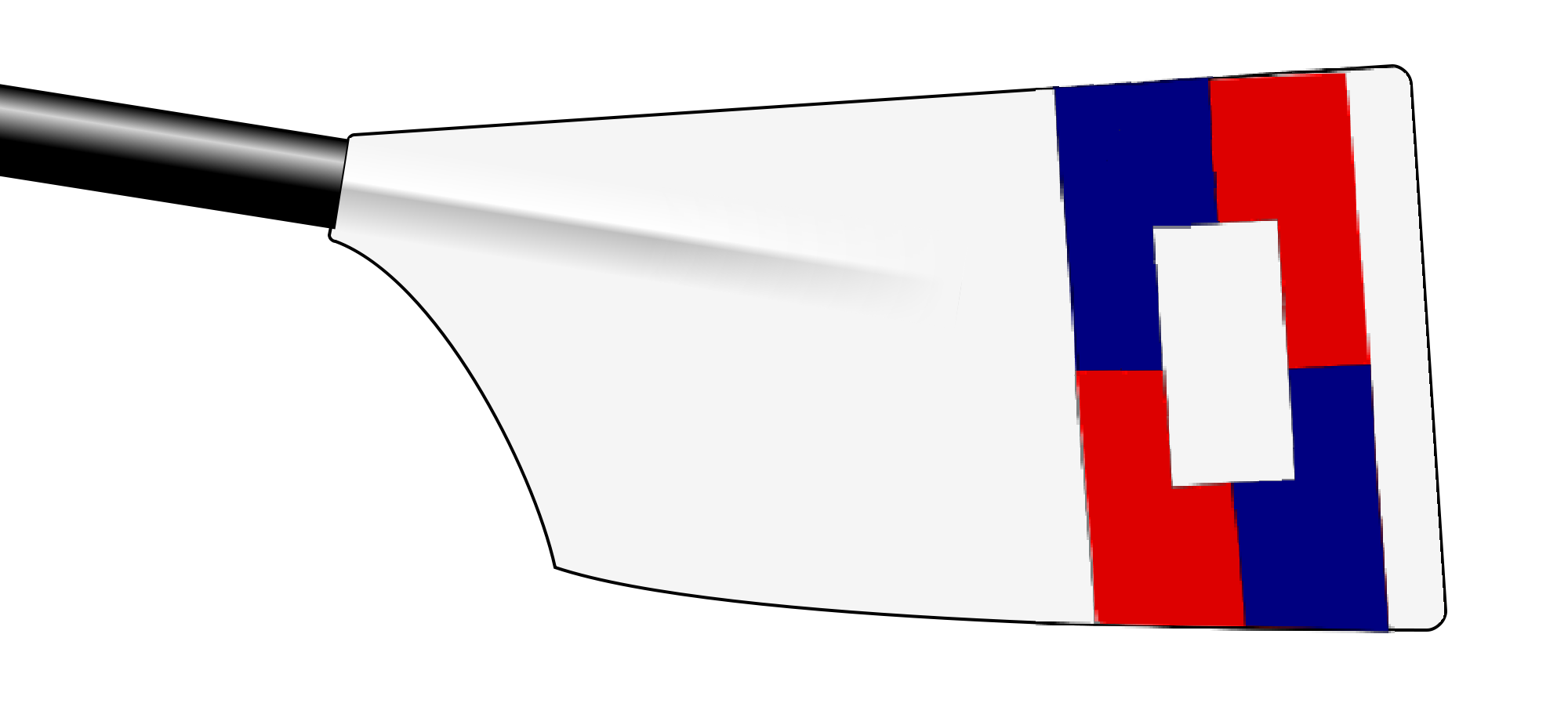
Pangbourne College Boat Club blade

Pangbourne offers students a range of sports with professional coaching. The performance of the Pangbourne College Boat Club is exceptional. The school has won the Princess Elizabeth Challenge Cup four times at the Henley Royal Regatta.

The college has a rugby club, with the first XV progressing to the latter stages of the Daily Mail Cup in recent years. (FTC) In 2013 "The Red Wall" became associated with the London Irish Rugby Club. This now gives team members access to professional training through the London Irish's Academy. A number of Pangbournians have gone on to play at county, academy and national level, whilst still at the school.

=== Non-sporting activities ===
The college has a Combined Cadet Force contingent consisting of three sections: Royal Navy, Royal Marines and Army. In the year 2013–2014 13 pupils went to the Falkland Islands to complete their gold Duke of Edinburgh's Award expedition.

There is a marching band. Formed originally to provide fifes, drums and bugles to lead parades, it has now developed brass and wind sections as well, and performs outside the college for charity events. Each year it leads the Remembrance Sunday service parade through Pangbourne village.

The school has a new music centre. It has inaugurated the Pangbourne College piano festival, in which participating pupils come from all over the Home Counties and London to take part, using the pianos in its three recital halls. There is an annual Pangbourne College composers` competition.

== Leadership and prefects ==
Pupil leadership positions
Abbreviation	Position	Remarks
CCCC	Chief cadet captain of college	Equivalent to head boy and girl
CCC	Chief cadet captain	Head of a division, one in each of the six divisions
CC	Cadet captain	Deputy head of a division, one or two in each house
CL	Cadet leader	As of September 2013 all upper sixth formers are appointed cadet leaders
CO	Cadet officer	A general term for all leadership positions

== Falkland Islands Memorial Chapel ==
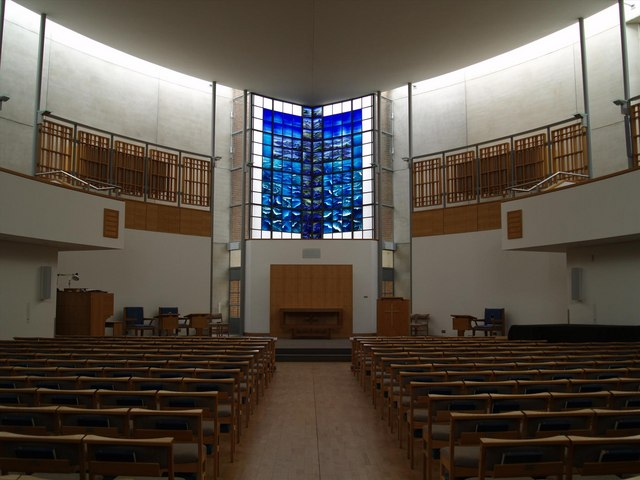
The interior of the chapel, showing John Clark's stained glass memorial window (centre)

The Falkland Islands Memorial Chapel at the school was opened by Queen Elizabeth II in March 2000. It was built to commemorate the lives and sacrifice of all those who died during the Falklands War of 1982, and the courage of those who served with them to protect the sovereignty of the Falkland Islands. The shape of the building was designed to resemble a ship, reflecting the college's naval history. It was largely due to this history that the college was chosen as the site for this national memorial chapel, together with the fact that 45 Old Pangbournians (OP) served in the Falklands conflict. More than a third of these OPs were either decorated or mentioned in despatches; most publicly known of the OPs taking part at the time were D.H. Scott-Masson (Pangbourne 1944–46) who was captain of Canberra, the P&O liner converted to troop ship and hospital ship for the conflict; and Major (later Lieutenant Colonel) Ewen Southby-Tailyour RM (Pangbourne 1955–59), who was one of the first ashore with the retaking of the islands. A gifted yachtsman, he is also an author, and among other books, he had published a detailed sailing guide to the coasts around the islands called Falkland Island Shores, which was withdrawn by the Ministry of Defence at the outbreak of hostilities. The Queen returned to the college in 2007, together with the Duke of Edinburgh, the former Prime Minister Margaret Thatcher, the then-current Prime Minister Tony Blair, and service chiefs responsible for the conduct of that war, to mark the 25th anniversary of the Argentine surrender. Links between the Falkland Islands and the college were also recently highlighted by the visit this year to the chapel of the Falkland Islands Governor, Colin Roberts.

On the south side of the building, there is the World War II memorial window, commemorating more than 200 former cadets who lost their lives in that conflict. A number of medals and citations were won during this war by Old Pangbournians, including 2 George Crosses for service in the Merchant Navy: an Albert Medal won for saving life at sea in the Mediterranean, and converted to a George Cross in 1971; and a George Cross awarded in naval bomb disposal. A further 31 Distinguished Service Orders, 91 Distinguished Service Crosses, and 2 George Medals were awarded. (Note: The full list comprises: 2 George Crosses; 31 Distinguished Service Orders; 91 Distinguished Service Crosses; 2 George Medals; 18 Distinguished Flying Crosses; 7 Air Force Crosses; 17 Military Crosses; 2 CBEs; 21 OBEs; 7 MBEs; 2 British Empire Medals and; a Lloyds War Medal for Bravery at sea. 168 Old Pangbournians were mentioned in despatches.) The window denotes an airman, a Merchant Navy seaman, a commando and a naval officer. It was transferred from the college's former St. Nicholas Chapel.

Pangbourne's war effort was so significant that it prompted a special visit from King George VI and his daughter, the then Princess Elizabeth, for the Founder's Day prize giving in 1943, at the height of the war. The college has had many other visits from members of the British royal family over the years, beginning with the Prince of Wales in 1927 for the college's tenth anniversary – he later became Edward VIII; and continuing with visits from Princess Alice through to four further visits by the Queen; four from the Duke of Edinburgh; a visit from Queen Elizabeth The Queen Mother in 1980; and visits from Earl Mountbatten, The Princess Royal and the Duke of York, who is also Patron of the chapel. The most recent visit by the Queen and the Duke of Edinburgh took place on 9 May 2017, with a service in the chapel, followed by a parade, to help mark the college's centennial year.

The Memorial Chapel – which cost a total of £2.3 million and was opened in March 2000 by Her Majesty The Queen – seats 580 within the ground floor area and gallery; its design, which came about as a result of a nation-wide competition won by Crispin Wride Architectural Design Studio, is reminiscent of the shape of a ship – almond or 'mandorla' shaped – denoting hands 'cupped' in prayer. Natural light flows down the pale coloured inside walls from clear glass surrounding the curved roof and diffused through its focal feature at the north end – a memorial window with stained glass depicting the Falkland Islands within Christ's Cross surrounded by a lively sea in vibrant shades of blue, green, yellow and grey – designed by John Clark Visitors experience a feeling of calm and comfort within the body of the church and gallery area – created by the soft ash and neutral colours surrounding them. There are also some beautifully engraved clear glass panels within each of the main internal and external doors, which take them on a journey from the turbulence of war to the tranquillity of peace.

— About the Chapel, The Falkland Islands Memorial Chapel website

Each seat has been donated by an organisation or individual, and under each seat is a kneeler with the name of one of the Falklands` casualties.

The chapel was the winner of Private Eye's Sir Hugh Casson Award for the worst new building of the year in 2000, with the magazine's architecture critic, 'Piloti', describing it as ""so very like the Ruskin Library that its 'architects' are obviously shameless".

== Notable Old Pangbournians ==
- Jeffrey Bernard, journalist and writer of the column "Low Life" in The Spectator, and subject of the play Jeffrey Bernard is Unwell by Keith Waterhouse.
- Matthieu Blazy, creative director at Chanel from December 2024.
- Beverley Cross, playwright of Half a Sixpence, starring Tommy Steele, among many other productions, and late husband to actress Dame Maggie Smith.
- Lt Cdr Mike Cumberlege DSO & Bar, RD, Greek Medal of Honour, RNR, SOE – murdered in Sachsenhausen concentration camp in 1945.
- The Hon Francis (Frank) Davies, multi-award-winning record producer.
- Patrick Derham, former headmaster of Westminster School
- Lord Mountevans, Jeffrey Richard de Corban Evans SBStJ, Past Prime Warden Shipwrights' Company, and Sheriff of The City of London, 2012–13. In 2015 Evans became the 688th Lord Mayor of the City of London, and was also an elected member of the House of Lords. He sat as Lord Mountevans.
- Sir Robin Gillett, 2nd Baronet GBE RD, Master Mariner; youngest ever staff commander, Canadian Pacific Lines; Royal Navy Reserve officer; Lord Mayor of London at the time of the Queen's Silver Jubilee (1976–77); and former Gentleman Usher of the Purple Rod.
- Jefferson Hack, journalist and magazine editor, co-founder of the magazine Dazed & Confused
- Lieutenant Commander Roger Hill DSO DSC, destroyer captain and author
- Mike Hailwood MBE GM, motorcycle racer and 12 times Isle of Man TT champion.
- Patrick Hawes Resident composer and music teacher at Pangbourne College
- Colin Hodgkinson (RAF officer), partially disabled wartime fighter pilot
- Sir William Garth Morrison Kt CBE DL, former naval officer, former Chief Scout and late Lord Lieutenant of East Lothian.
- Rodney Pattisson MBE, yachtsman and twice Olympic gold medallist.
- Captain John Ridgway MBE, Special Air Service and Parachute Regiment officer, writer, yachtsman, first Atlantic rower (with Chay Blyth), and founder of Ardmore Adventure School.
- Ken Russell, film director and producer, perhaps best known for his film The Devils.
- Andrew "Bart" Simpson MBE, sailor, Olympic gold and silver medallist, and Americas Cup professional, who drowned in a sailing accident off California on 9 May 2013.
- Colonel David Smiley LVO OBE MC and Bar, World War II special forces and intelligence officer, Special Operations Executive and MI6 agent, author, and officer commanding the mounted escort at the Queen's Coronation; often considered to be one of John le Carré`s inspirations for George Smiley in his Tinker, Tailor series of spy novels.
- Frederick Treves awarded the BEM and the Lloyd's War Medal for Bravery at Sea as a 17-year-old merchant seaman during World War II. Subsequently, a successful actor.
- Very Rev Richard Shuttleworth Wingfield-Digby, Dean of Peterborough, 1966–80.
- Lieutenant Colonel Ewen Southby-Tailyour OBE, Royal Marines officer, author, Yachtsman of the Year 1982.
- Tom Spencer, former Conservative MEP who became leader of the UK Conservative MEPs, and chairman of the EU Parliamentary Foreign Affairs Committee. He stood down in 1999.
- Nigel, Lord Vinson LVO, businessman and inventor, and former British Army officer.
- John Young CBE, former naval officer and chairman of Young's Brewery, Wandsworth.
