= Brookwood High School =

Brookwood High School may refer to:

- Brookwood High School (Alabama)
- Brookwood High School (Georgia)
- Brookwood High School (Ontario, Wisconsin)
- Brookwood School
