= Lord Mayor's Show =

Annual street parade in London, England

Coordinates: 51°30′55.97″N 0°5′32.18″W

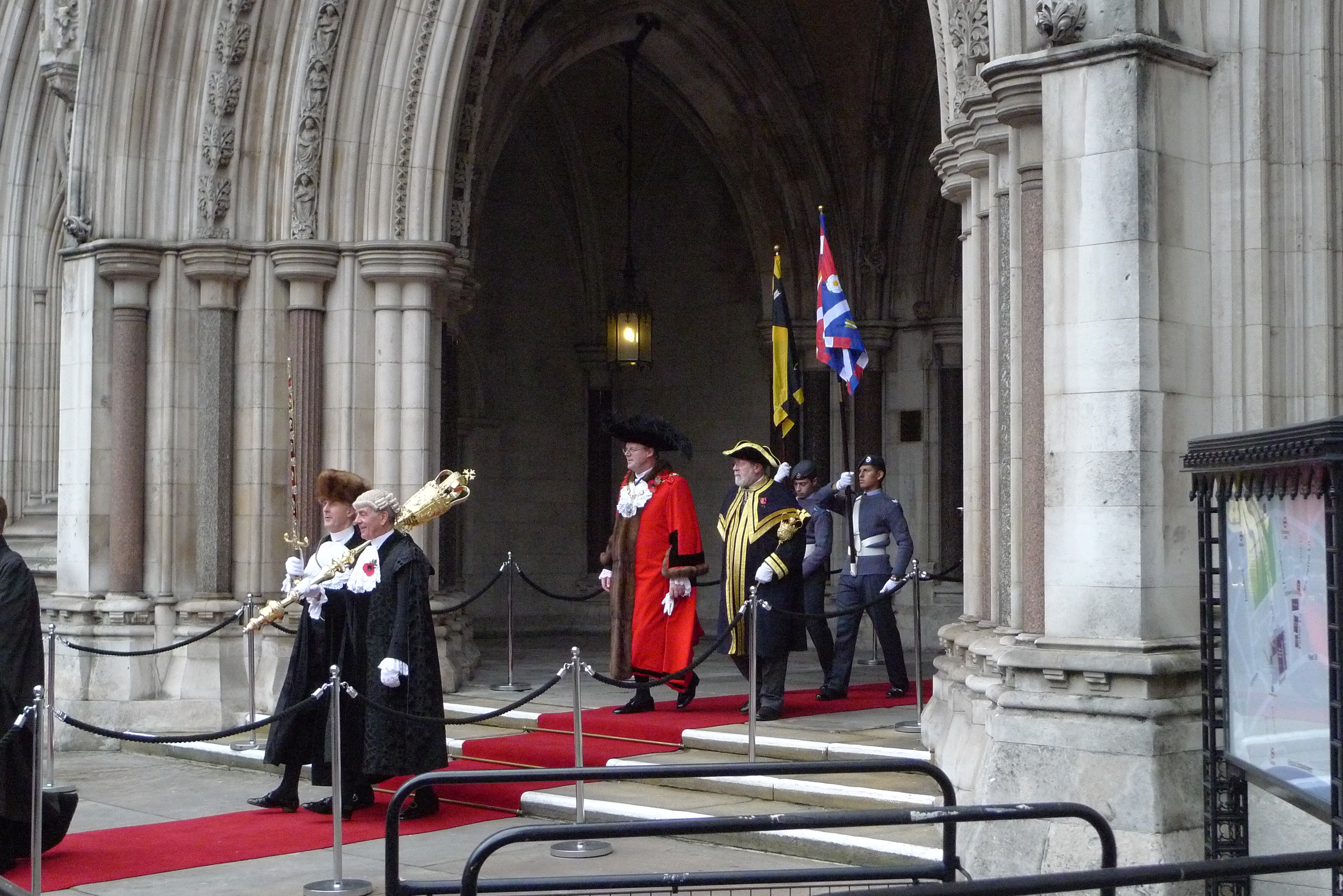
Lord Mayor David Wootton and some of his entourage emerging from the Royal Courts of Justice, at the end of half-time during the 2011 Lord Mayor's Show

The Lord Mayor's Show or Lady Mayor's Show is an annual street parade in London, England that takes place as the inauguration ceremony of the Lord Mayor, who is newly appointed every year. The public parade reflects that this was once one of the most prominent offices in England and subsequently the United Kingdom. It is one of the best-known annual events in London as well as one of the longest-established, dating back to the 13th century.

The show is named after the Lord Mayor of the City of London, a city and ceremonial county within Greater London and the historic centre of the wider metropolis. This is distinct from the Mayor of London, the elected head of the Greater London Authority (a position which has existed only since 2000). The City is London's main financial district, widely known informally as 'the Square Mile'.

The Lord Mayor's Show is centred on a street parade, which in its modern form is a light-hearted combination of traditional British pageantry and elements of carnival. On the day after being sworn in, the Lord Mayor and several others participate in a procession from Guildhall, via Mansion House and St Paul's Cathedral, in the heart of the City of London, to the Royal Courts of Justice on the edge of the City of Westminster, where the new Lord Mayor swears allegiance to the Crown. Until 1882, the procession went to Westminster Hall.

== Origin and date of the show ==
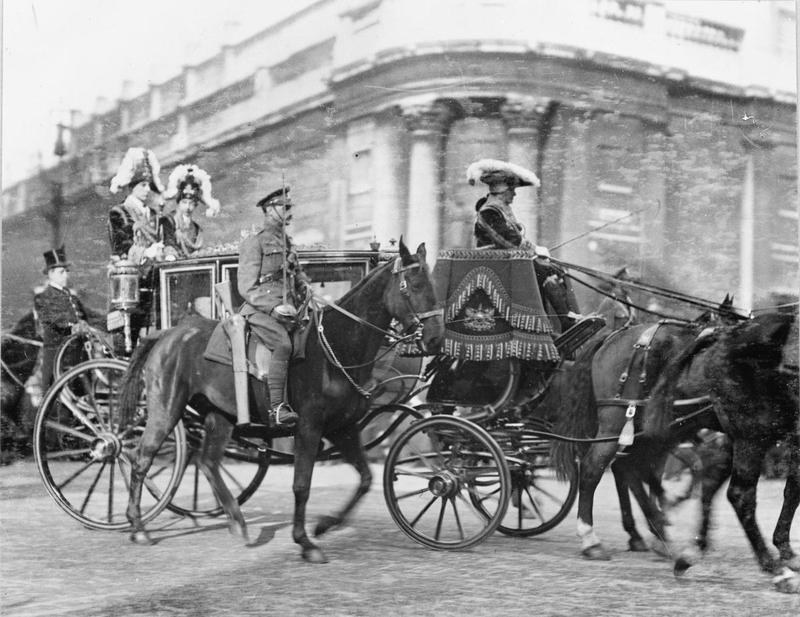
The Lord Mayor's Show, 1918

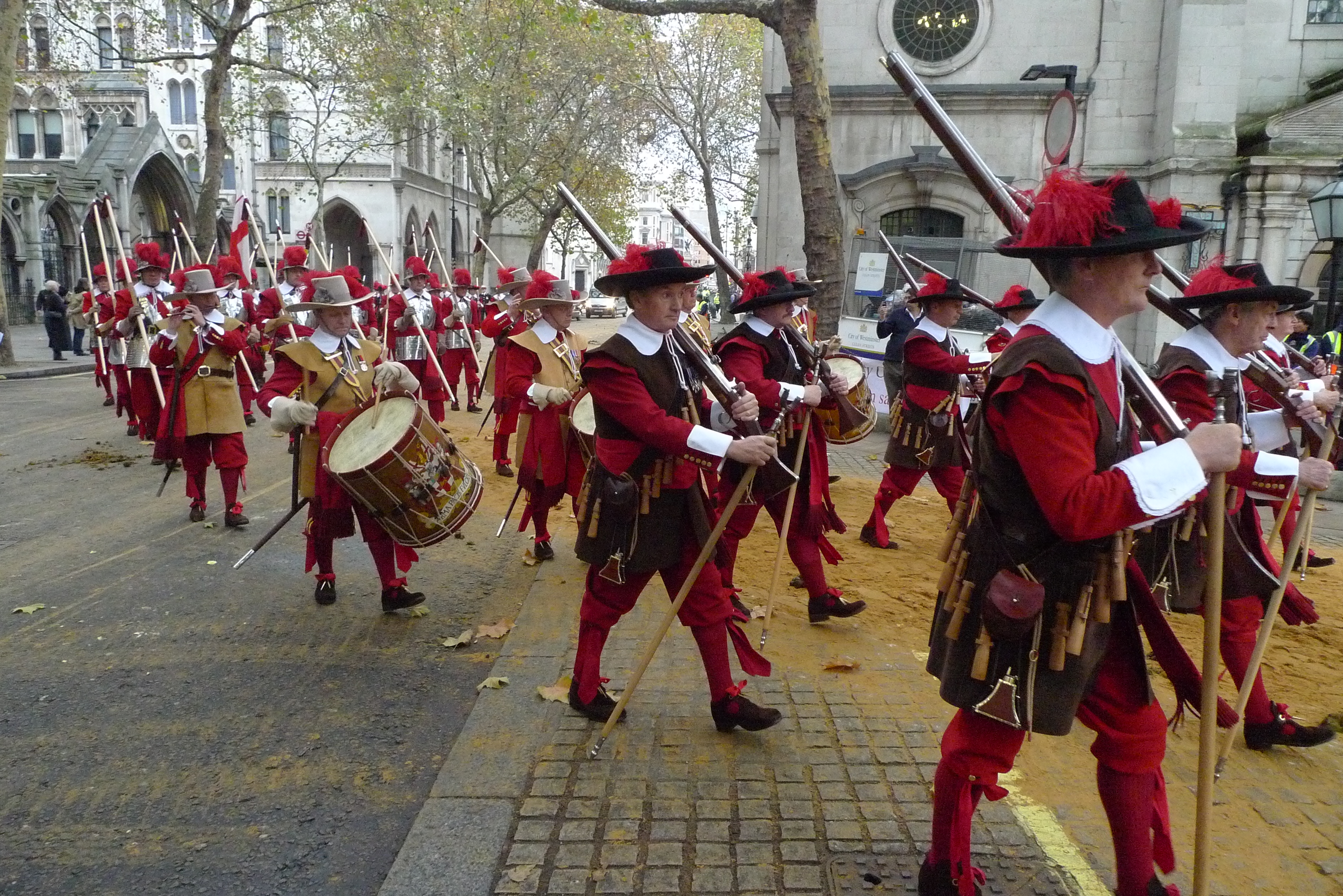
The Company of Pikemen and Musketeers of the Honourable Artillery Company leaving the Royal Courts of Justice and heading south towards the River Thames, during the second half of the 2011 Lord Mayor's Show.

The office of Lord Mayor dates from 1189, and it was a requirement of the charter establishing it that the mayor travelled to the royal enclave at Westminster to present himself to the monarch's representatives, the senior judges as Barons of the Exchequer, to take an oath of loyalty to the sovereign upon beginning his term. The event is officially listed in the City's Civic Calendar as 'The Procession to the Royal Courts of Justice and Presentation of the Lord Mayor to the Chief Justices'; when the Royal Courts moved from Westminster to the Strand location in 1882, the route was shortened. Originally, this journey was mostly made by barge on the River Thames, the usual method of transport for this route in those days. Pageantry and display gradually grew around the trip, comparable to the far less frequent Royal Entry parades that usually followed a coronation or royal wedding.

In the 16th century the "show" become a major entertainment for Londoners. This rests significantly on the shoulders of the Lord Mayors Sir Rowland Hill and his friend Sir John Gresham, in revival of the Marching Watch or Mid Summer Watches in London. In these pageants 15,000 citizens all in bright harness, with coats of white Silk or Cloath, and Chains of Gold, passed through London to Westminster, and round St. James's Park, and on to Holborn. The long daylight of June caused the civic government to fear disorder; the Watch was originally a show of the city's policing force with armed men marching in the streets., but it evolved into an annual festival of street pageantry which reached its spectacular peak in Hill's time and evolved into the Lord Mayor's Show. These developments are recorded in Lady Long's household-book at Hengrave, Suffolk, which notes that Henry VIII watched these marches from Mercers Hall with Jane Seymour; "the presence of more than 300 demi lunces and light horsemen" were a particular highlight.

In London, the show occurred annually on the day after the feast day of St Simon and St Jude, 29 October. In 1751, Great Britain replaced the Julian calendar with the Gregorian calendar; the Lord Mayor's Show was then moved to 9 November. In 1959, another change was made: the Lord Mayor's Show is now held on the second Saturday in November, usually one day before the Remembrance Sunday commemorations (except in years where the 1st November falls on a Sunday, as in 2026). Since 1655 when the event was revived after a break of some fifteen years because of the English Civil War, the Lord Mayor's Show has regularly been held on the scheduled day, having only been cancelled twice, firstly in 1852, when the show made way for the state funeral of the Duke of Wellington, and secondly in 2020 when the show was cancelled because of the COVID-19 pandemic. The modern Lord Mayor's procession is a direct descendant of that first journey to Westminster.

The first Lady Mayor's Show in the event's history was held in 2025, when Dame Susan Langley was elected as the third female to hold the post, but the first to take the of title of Lady Mayor.

== The Lord Mayor's transport ==
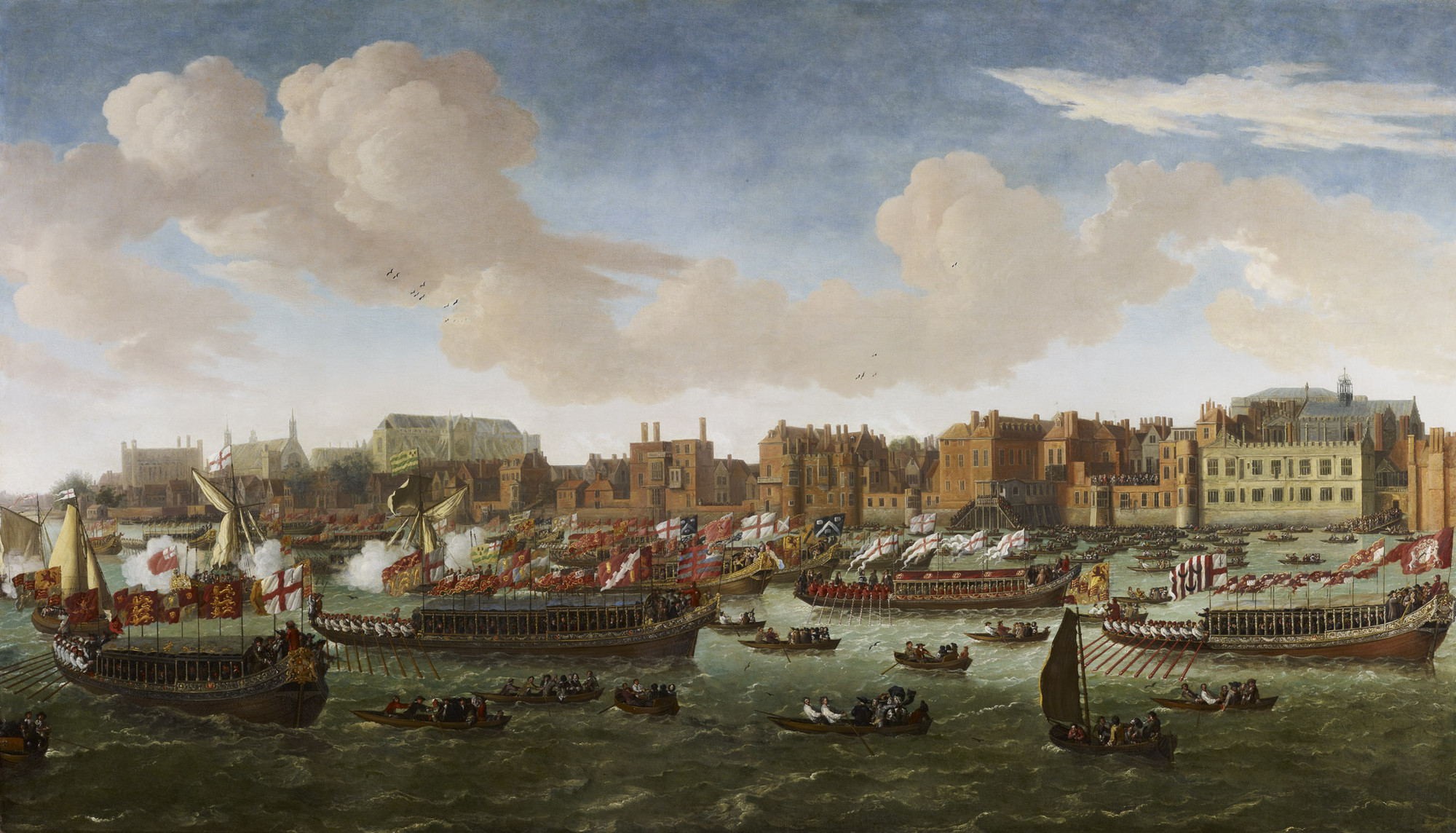
The Lord Mayor's water-procession on the Thames, circa 1683

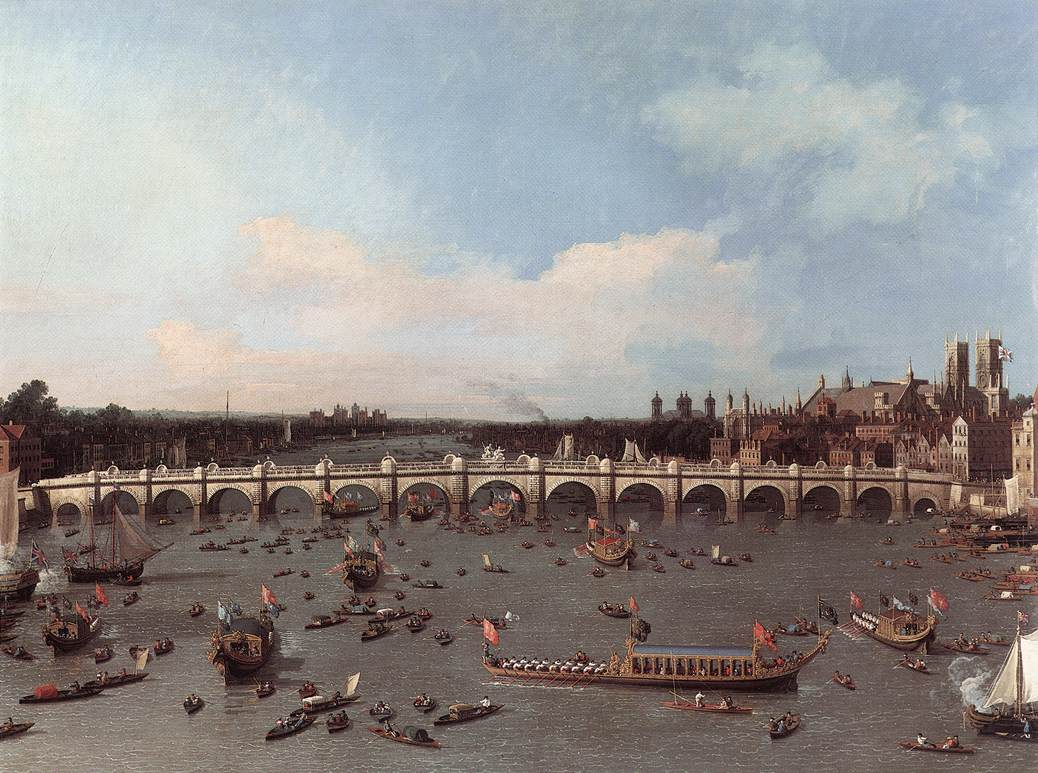
In 1747, the Lord Mayor went to the City of Westminster on a barge via the River Thames.

Formerly, the route was varied each year so that the procession could pass through the Lord Mayor's home ward; since 1952, however, the route has been fixed. The Lord Mayor rode on horseback, rode in a coach, or went on a barge via the River Thames, based on the route chosen. The earliest medieval processions were on land, but John Norman, the mayor elected for 1453, had a barge made for himself and initiated the custom of travelling to Westminster on the river, which continued until the last river pageant by Thomas Quested Finnis in 1856.

The tradition was revived in 2026, when Lord Mayor Bronek Masojada will leave Westminster aboard the ceremonial barge Jubilant, followed by a flotilla of livery company boats, before coming ashore at HMS President, and continuing his journey by the Lord Mayor's Coach.

On more than one occasion, elements of the pageant have been used as puns on the Lord Mayor's name; in 1616 John Leman had a lemon tree in the procession, while the following year William Cockayne had an artificial cock crowing and flapping its wings. More recently, Sir Murray Fox in 1974 had a large model of a fox in the procession.

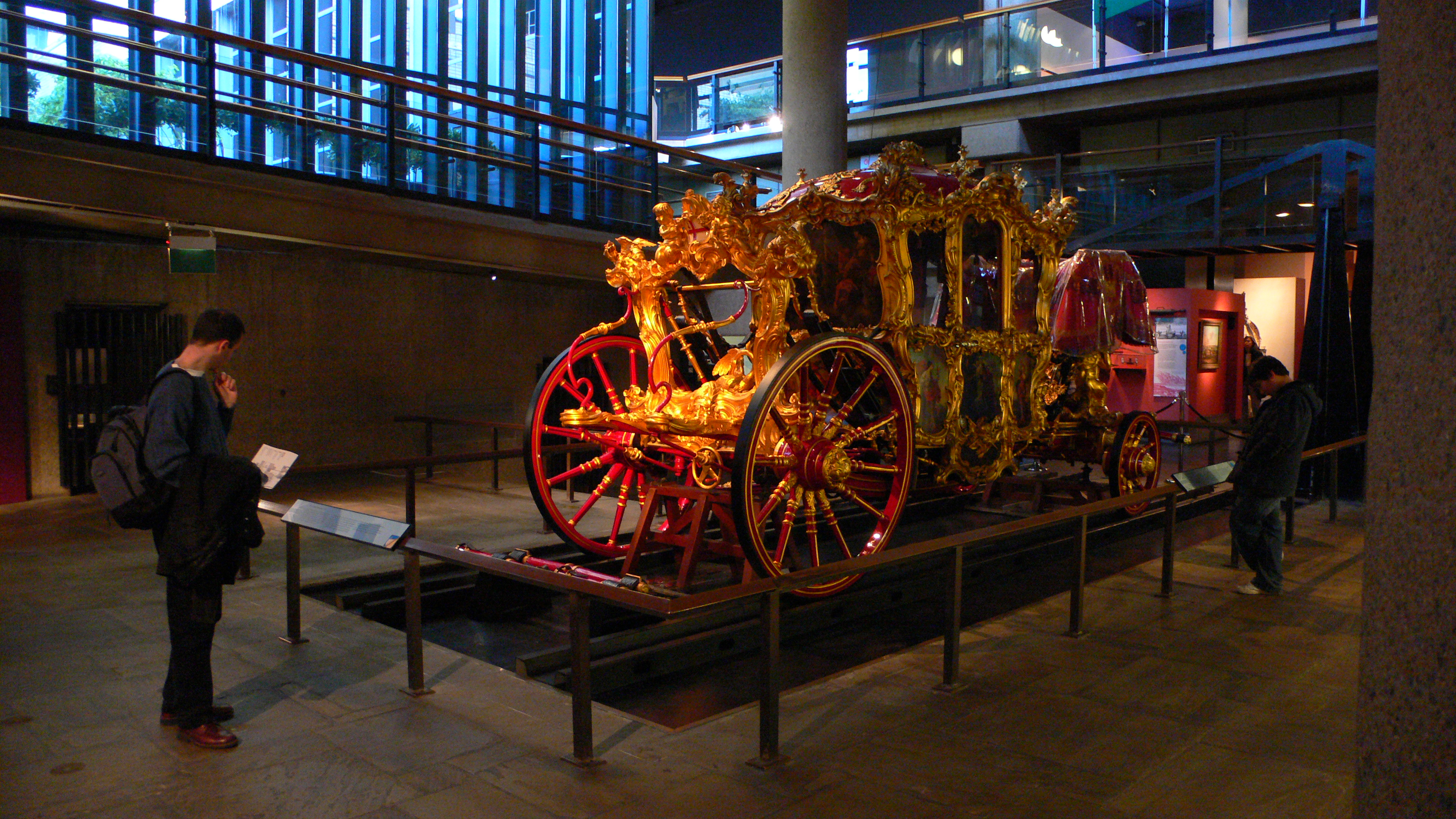
The Lord Mayor's Coach, housed in the Museum of London on London Wall

In 1711, Lord Mayor Gilbert Heathcote was unseated from his horse, breaking his leg, after which a coach was used. A coach was hired for the purpose until 1757 when Sir Charles Asgill, a banker who became the next Lord Mayor, commissioned Joseph Berry of Leather Lane in Holborn to make the Lord Mayor of London's State Coach which is still used today. The original cost of £1,065.0s.3d. equates to around £120,000, but the replacement value has been estimated at £2 million. The side panels of the coach were painted by Cipriani, who also painted those for the monarch's Gold State Coach. It is pulled by six horses, two fewer than the monarch's. Riding postillion on the Lord Mayor's State Carriage are two winners of the annual Doggett's Coat and Badge rowing race. An escort to the coach recalls the waterborne transport of the Lord Mayor; they were liveried watermen carrying oars: formerly, the Mayor's barge was rowed by members of the Company of Watermen and Lightermen.

== Participants in the show ==
=== Great Twelve Livery Companies ===
The Great Twelve City Livery Companies — the Mercers, Grocers, Drapers, Fishmongers, Goldsmiths, Merchant Taylors*, Skinners*, Haberdashers, Salters, Ironmongers, Vintners and Clothworkers — participate as of right and the other livery companies by invitation, though the Lord Mayor's "mother company" is always included: in 2019 this was the Haberdashers' Company.

=== Privileged regiments of the City of London and others ===
Other participants include bands and members of "privileged regiments" of the City of London such as the Honourable Artillery Company and The Royal Fusiliers. Privileged regiments have the right to march through the City with bayonets fixed, colours flying, and drums beating.

The many other participants lend a unique flavour to the occasion which include organisations that the Lord Mayor wishes to support or has belonged to, such as charities, old schools and business associations before becoming Lord Mayor. St John Ambulance participates, for instance, as do the Zurich Guilds.

Gog and Magog are two woven willow giant reproductions of a pair of statues in the Guildhall. These popular icons reflect the pre-Roman legendary past of the City of London and they too are paraded by volunteers from The Guild of Young Freemen each year. The most recent representations were created by members of the Worshipful Company of Basketmakers.

== Schedule ==
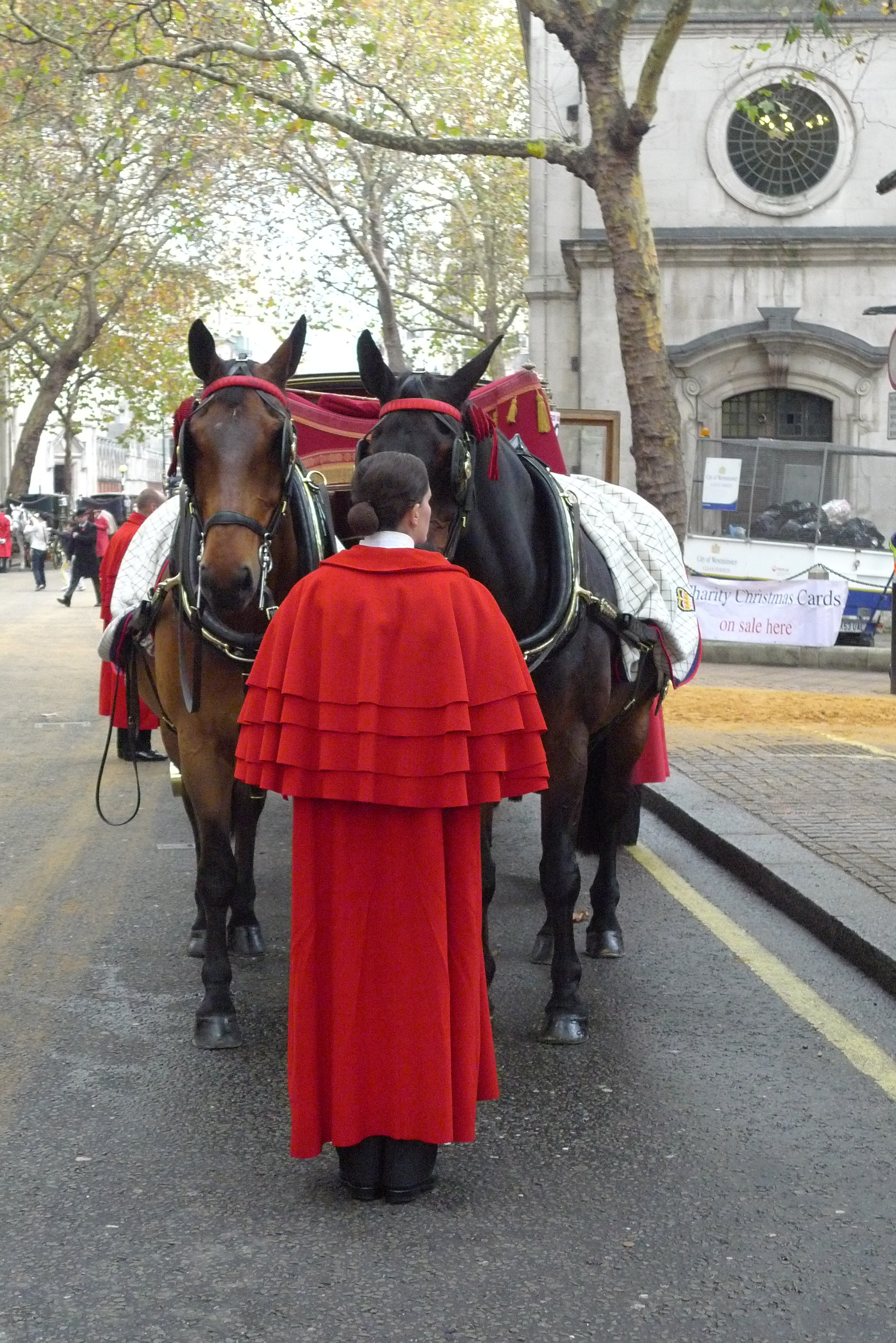
A coachwoman waits for the resumption of the Lord Mayor's procession, 2011

The procession begins at the Guildhall where the Lord Mayor receives with the new Sheriffs personal gifts from a restricted group of relevant City institutions, usually including the Lord Mayor's own Livery Company and Ward Club and then there is a breakfast. The Lord Mayor is escorted to their coach in Guildhall Yard by the Court of Aldermen and sets off to Mansion House, the official residence of the Lord Mayor. There the Lord Mayor awaits the show to pass from the terrace. The Lord Mayor joins the rear of the show, after having watched a flypast by the Royal Air Force.

The route of the outward parade in 2013 was from Guildhall, along Princes Street to Bank junction and past Mansion House. From there the procession travelled down Poultry, Cheapside, New Change, St Paul's Churchyard, Ludgate Hill, Fleet Street and the Strand.

Along the route, the Lord Mayor stops at St Paul's Cathedral in order to receive a blessing from the Dean on the Cathedral steps. Upon arrival at the Royal Courts of Justice on the Strand, the Lord Mayor takes the oath of allegiance. The return procession then reassembles on Aldwych and returns via Essex Street to Temple Place then along the Victoria Embankment and Queen Victoria Street back to Mansion House where the Lord Mayor takes review of the Pikemen and Musketeers of the Honorable Artillery Company. The Lord Mayor then re-enters Mansion House via the steps to the Terrace with the Aldermen and entertains guests and volunteers who have co-ordinated the event.

The parade, which typically begins at about 11 am, concludes at about 3:30 pm. The procession is over 3 miles (roughly 5 km) long but the route itself is much shorter; the head of the procession reaches the end of the route before the Lord Mayor even leaves Mansion House. In the evening, a fireworks display is held subject to weather conditions.

== Media coverage ==
The Lord Mayor's Show is televised live by the BBC in a special programme typically broadcast on BBC One, it has been broadcast on the BBC since 1937, making it the second longest running television broadcast worldwide. The broadcast has a commentary from the Mansion House, with reporters who interview participants.
