= David Wootton (lord mayor) =

English lawyer & politician (born 1950)

Sir David Wootton
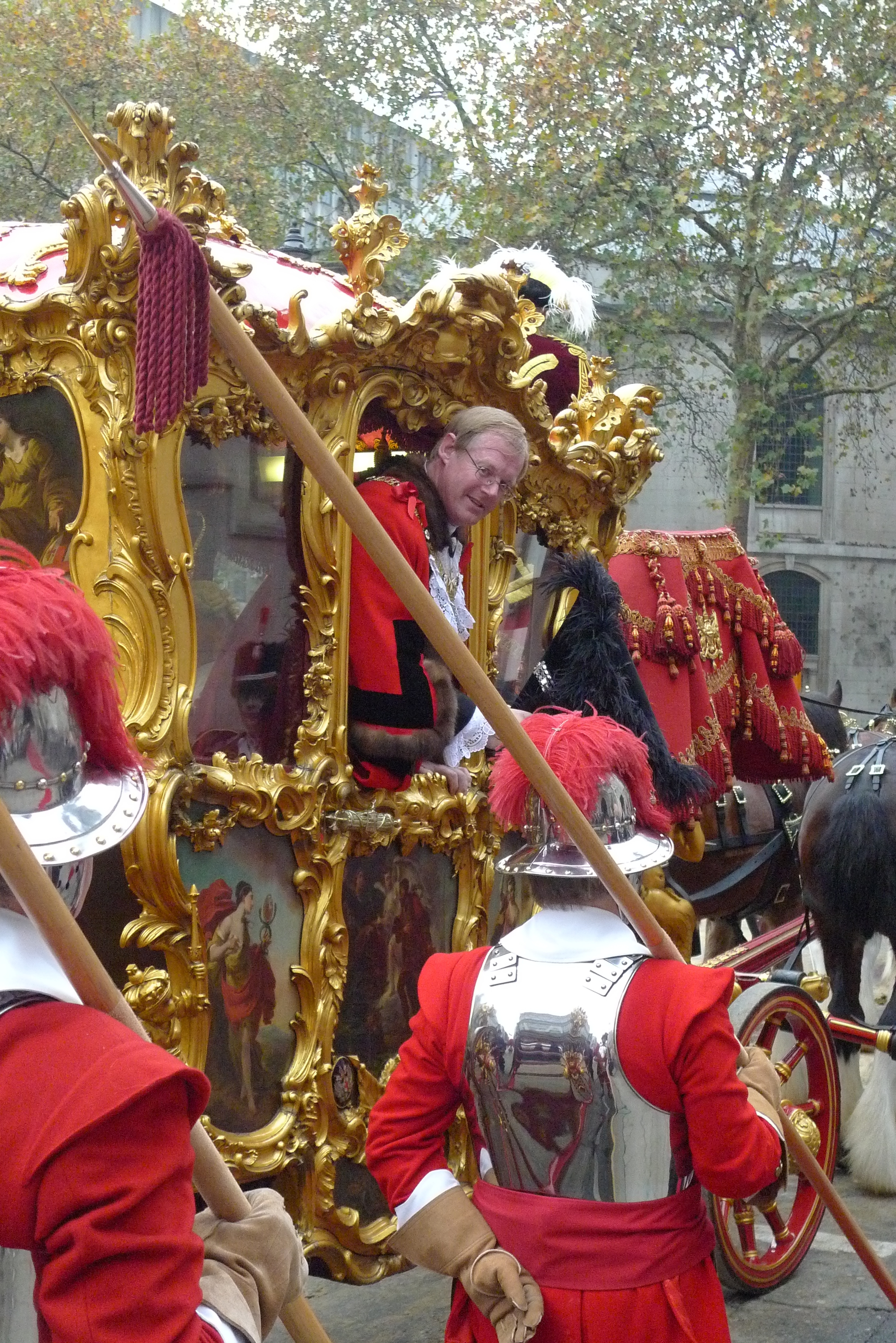
- Wootton, as newly-elected Lord Mayor, waving to the crowds from the Lord Mayor's Coach

684th Lord Mayor of London
- In office 11 November 2011 – 9 November 2012
- Preceded by: Sir Michael Bear
- Succeeded by: Sir Roger Gifford

Personal details
- Born: 21 July 1950 (age 76) Bradford, Yorkshire
- Spouse(s): Elizabeth, Lady Wootton
- Children: 4 children (Alexandra, James, Sophie and Christopher)
- Education: Jesus College, Cambridge
- Occupation: Lawyer
- Profession: Solicitor

Sir David Hugh Wootton (born 21 July 1950) is an English lawyer and politician. He was the 684th Lord Mayor of London, from 2011 to 2012, and was Alderman of the Ward of Langbourn until 2 November 2024, when he retired from the Court of Aldermen.

== Early life ==
Wootton was educated at Bradford Grammar School before going up to Jesus College, Cambridge, to read Classics and then Law. While at Cambridge he also captained his college's boat club in 1972 and rowed in the First Boat which swept the board against all comers – and until he became Lord Mayor he endeavoured to row there once a year with his contemporaries.

== Career ==
From 1979 to 2015 Wootton was a partner at Allen & Overy, the international law firm headquartered in London with offices in 30 countries, specialising in corporate transactions and best-practice compliance with law and regulation in corporate governance. This involves dealing with mergers and acquisitions, IPOs and joint ventures across various international markets.

Having a strong interest in the governance of the City of London, Wootton stood for election to Common Council and was elected as Common councilman for the Ward of Farringdon Within in 2002. In 2005 he was elected Alderman for the Ward of Langbourn. He was Deputy Chairman of the Finance Committee and a member of the Policy and Resources and the City Lands and Bridge House Estates Committees. In 2009 he was elected Sheriff before serving as Lord Mayor of London from 2011 to 2012.

Wootton was previously the chairman of the General Purposes Committee of Aldermen, which oversees the work of the Lord Mayor, the Sheriffs and the Court of Aldermen and the operations of Mansion House. He had chaired the Mayoral Visits Advisory Committee, which decides on and manages the programme of oversees visits by the Lord Mayor and Sheriffs, and served on the Magistracy and Livery Sub Committee. He also sat on the Policy & Resources Committee and the Resource Allocation and Public Relations and Economic Development Sub Committees, and was the deputy chairman of the Courts Sub Committee, of the Policy & Resources Committee. He was the chairman of the Freedom Applications Committee, which reviews applications for Freedom of the City of London.

Wootton has made time throughout his career to devote to charitable and community activities in promotion of education and sport. Away from the Corporation of London, he is:

- Member of the Board of TheCityUK and the City Corporation's lead representative on the TheCityUK Brexit Law Committee, which is made up of representatives of the principal institutions in the legal profession and, under the auspices of the Ministry of Justice, advises the government on the legal issues arising in relation to Brexit
- Vice Chairman of the International Trade and Investment Group
- Director of The International Dispute Resolution Centre
- President of the City of London Branch of the Institute of Directors
- Trustee of Cross-Sector Safety and Security Communications
- Magistrate on the Central London Bench
- Chairman of the Trustees of Morden College
- Chairman of the Trustees of the King's Fund Staff Pension and Life Assurance Plan
- Member of the Board of Co-operation Ireland
- Past President and serves on the Council of the City Livery Club
- President of Langbourn Ward Club
- Trustee of the Jesus College Boat Club (Cambridge) Trust
- Trustee of the Steve Fairbairn Memorial Trust
- Trustee of the Oxford and Cambridge Rowing Foundation
- Trustee of Jesus College Cambridge Society
- Trustee of The Lord Mayor's 800th Anniversary Trust
- Trustee of Gad's Hill Heritage Centre Trust
- Member of the Institute of Cancer Research
- Honorary Professor at London Metropolitan University Business School
- Honorary Bencher of Gray's Inn
- Member of the Council of Royal Society of St George (City of London Branch)
- Member of United Wards' Club
- Patron of Prisoners Abroad

Wootton is Governor of several institutions, including:

- Bradford Grammar School
- Vice President of King Edward's School, Witley
- Governor and member of the Advisory Council and of the Investment Committee of Goodenough College

and, is a keen supporter of the Livery, being:

- Past Master of the Worshipful Company of Fletchers, the Solicitors' Company, the Worshipful Company of Information Technologists, the Guild of Freemen, the Worshipful Company of Glaziers and Painters of Glass and the Worshipful Company of Woolmen
- Master of the Company of Watermen and Lightermen
- Renter Warden of the Worshipful Company of Bowyers
- Liveryman of the Worshipful Company of Clockmakers
- Honorary Liveryman of the Worshipful Company of Security Professionals

Wootton is a Steward of Henley Royal Regatta and a member of Leander and London Rowing Clubs, as well as the Athenaeum, the Oxford and Cambridge, East India and City of London Clubs.

He has also been:

- Chairman of Local Partnerships LLP
- Chairman of Northern Ballet
- Co-chairman of the board organising the Global Law Summit in London, February 2015
- President of the City of London Law Society
- Governor of The Honourable the Irish Society
- Chair of the Board of Trustees of the Charles Dickens Museum
- Trustee of the National Opera Studio
- Governor of Guildhall School of Music and Drama
- President of the Guild of Young Freemen (previously known as the Society of Young Freemen)
- Master of the Guild of Freemen of the City of London in 2016.
- President of Farringdon Ward Club
- Almoner of Christ's Hospital
- Chairman of the Misys Charitable Foundation
- Director of the Saudi British Joint Business Council UK
- Music Patron of St Paul's Cathedral
- Director of the City of London Festival
- Governor of City of London Academy, Southwark
- Member of the Development Board of The Institute of Cancer Research
- Member of the Council of the National Trust (elected)
- Master of the Worshipful Company of Fletchers (2005–06)
- Master of the Solicitors' Company (2010–11)
- Chancellor of City University London (2011–12)

Wootton was knighted in the 2013 New Year Honours "for services to legal business, charity and the City of London".

Wootton was conferred Doctor of Laws honoris causa by the City University London in 2012, Honorary Doctor Staffordshire University, Honorary Fellow Jesus College Cambridge, Honorary Fellow Guildhall School of Music and Drama ("HonFGS"), one of her Majesty's Lieutenants for the City of London and Knight of Justice of the Most Venerable Order of the Hospital of St John of Jerusalem.

== Personal life ==
Married to Elizabeth (Liz), they have two sons (James and Christopher), two daughters (Alexandra and Sophie) and nine grandchildren. Sir David and Lady Wootton live in Kent.

=== Freemasonry ===
Wootton is a committed Freemason. In 2007, he served as Senior Grand Warden of the Metropolitan Grand Lodge of London and was Past Grand Sword Bearer in 2012. In March 2014, he was promoted to Assistant Grand Master of the United Grand Lodge of England. In 2022, Sir David was promoted to Deputy Grand Master. He is also currently the Second Grand Principal in the Royal Arch.

Civic offices
Preceded by Sir Roger Gifford	Sheriff of London; 2009–2010	Succeeded by Dame Fiona Woolf
Preceded by Sir Michael Bear	Lord Mayor of London; 2011–2012	Succeeded by Sir Roger Gifford
