= Gentleman Usher =

Member of a royal household

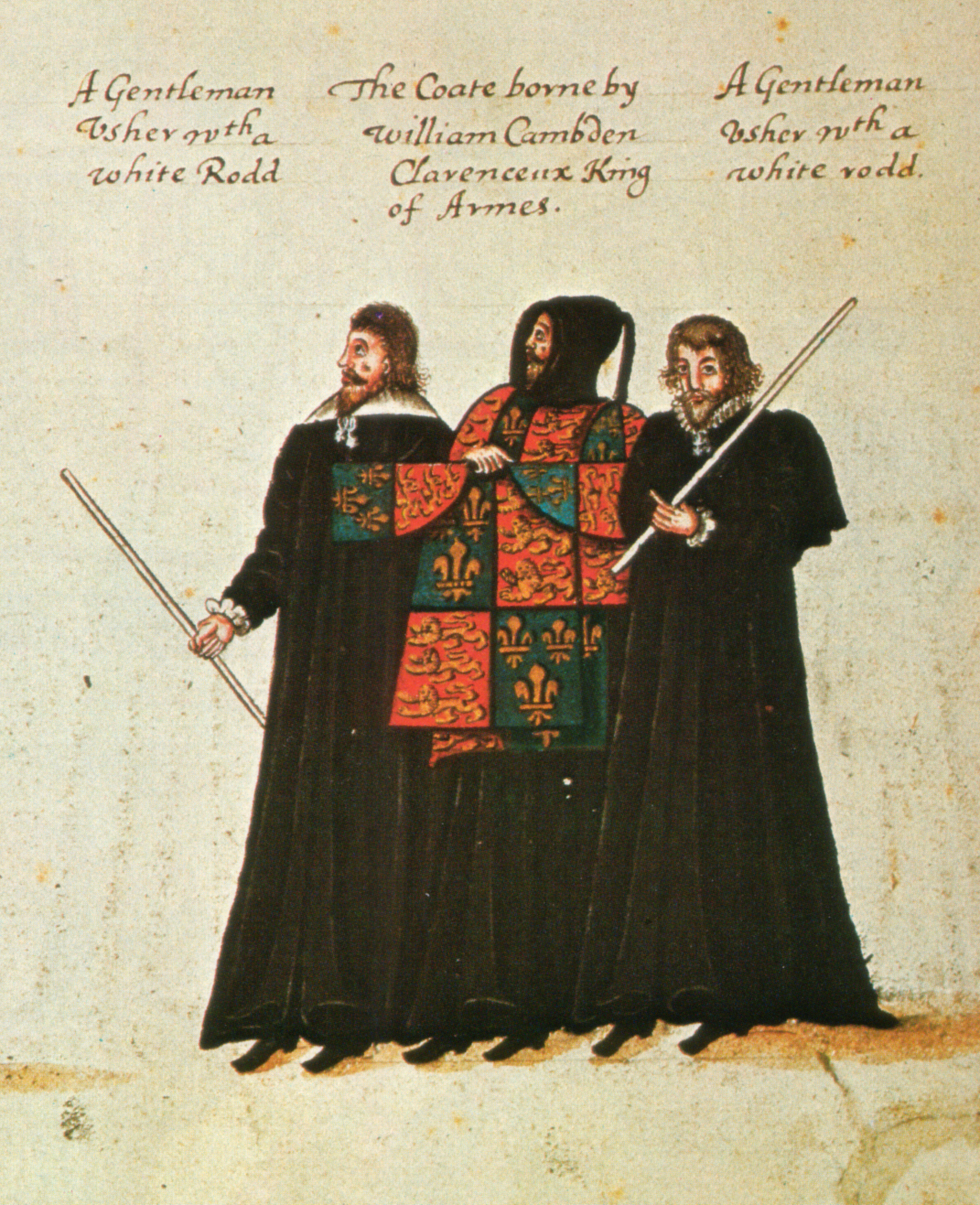
The funeral procession of Queen Elizabeth I, 1603; William Camden, Clarenceux King of Arms bearing the tabard or "coate", between two Gentleman Ushers. Inscription: "A Gentleman Usher with a white Rodd"

Gentleman Usher and Lady Usher are titles for some officers of the Royal Household of the United Kingdom. Historically the Gentlemen Ushers were among the most senior officials of the king's Chamber, next in rank only to the Chamberlain and the Vice-Chamberlain; their role was first documented in the fifteenth century (for a list of office-holders from the Restoration of the monarchy in 1660 up to the present day, see List of Lady and Gentleman Ushers).

Gentleman Ushers were originally a class of servants found not only in the Royal Household, but in lesser establishments as well. They were regularly found in the households of Tudor noblemen, and were prescribed by Richard Brathwait, in his Household of an Earle, as one of the "officers and Servants the state of an Earle requireth to have".

== General duties ==
In a noble household, the Gentleman Usher occupied an intermediate level between the steward (the usual head) and the ordinary servants; they were responsible for overseeing the work of the servants "above stairs", particularly those who cooked and waited upon the nobleman at meals, and saw to it the great chamber was kept clean by the lesser servants. He was also responsible for overseeing other miscellaneous service, such as the care of the nobleman's chapel and bed-chambers. It was traditionally the Gentleman Usher who swore in new members of the nobleman's service.

The duties of a Gentleman Usher, not unlike those of a contemporary butler, made him quite important in Tudor and 17th-century households. George Chapman's play The Gentleman Usher has as its title character the pompous but easily fooled Bassiolo, Gentleman Usher to Lord Lasso. Henry VIII gave an usher's position and fee to the Italian merchant Leonardo Frescobaldi.

== In the Royal Household ==
The service of Gentleman Ushers at Court is attested since the fifteenth century. The Black Book of the Household of King Edward IV lists four Gentlemen Ushers of the Chamber, "whereof one or two continually sitteth at meats and suppers in the King's chamber, to see every thing done in due order, and to keep silence". Among other duties, the ushers were required to keep a tally of all food, drink and other items consumed in the Chamber and to provide a record of the same to the counting house daily.

Under Henry VII the duties of the Gentlemen Ushers were set out in more detail: for example, at least one usher was required to be in attendance every day, wherever the King was, to 'keep the door' between the hours of 8am and nightfall, during which time they were to "suffer no stranger to come in without the commandment of the Lord Chamberlain, or his deputy, or one of the King's council". The Gentlemen Ushers were high-ranking courtiers at this time, it being enjoined that "in the absence of the chamberlain, the usher shall have the same power to command in like manner". Prior to the Interregnum, Gentlemen Ushers carried a short white staff, half the length of that of the Lord Chamberlain, as a symbol of their authority.

Under Henry VIII the Gentleman Ushers were separated into three classes: Gentleman Ushers of the Privy Chamber, Gentleman Ushers Daily Waiters and Gentleman Ushers Quarter Waiters:

- The Gentlemen Ushers of the Privy Chamber waited in the Privy Chamber and at the door of the King's bedchamber. They were in charge of meals taken in the Privy Chamber and supervised the Grooms who swept the floors of the royal lodging, and laid straw and matts. One or more ushers accompanied the king when he walked in the gardens; and they would inspect the hygiene and safety of a stranger's house, a house other than a royal place, which the King intended to visit.
- The Gentlemen Ushers Daily Waiters performed an equivalent duty in the Presence Chamber, and were of the same rank as their counterparts in the Privy Chamber.
- The Gentlemen Ushers Quarter Waiters also waited in the Presence Chamber, but were junior to the Daily Waiters.

Yeomen Ushers were also employed, who were junior to the Gentlemen Ushers and performed more menial tasks; these were later integrated into the establishment of the Yeomen of the Guard.

At the Union of Crowns, James VI and I came to York in May 1603 and swore Elizabeth's former ushers as his servants, including Richard Coningsby and George Pollard, and the quarter waiters Thomas Rolles and Master Hariffe. Anne of Denmark, queen consort of James VI and I, had four usher quarter waiters as well as a gentleman usher John Tunstall. The yearly fee was £40, and to buy the office in queen's household in December 1603 would cost £250. When one of the ushers, Watson, died of plague, the queen's chamberlain Robert Sidney appointed a replacement and swore him in without consulting her. A Scottish usher called Bochan or Buchanan fought with Edward Herbert over Mary Middlemore one of Anne of Denmark's maids of honour. Tunstall and two of Anne of Denmark's usher quarter waiters, Francis Constable of Sherburn and Timothy Pinckney, later joined the household of Henrietta Maria as ushers with Maurice Drummond and William Gordon.

Following the Restoration, King Charles II reconstituted the royal household in a manner 'conformable to the ancient Ordinances of our House'. A detailed set of regulations was published with regard to the many and various duties of the Gentlemen Ushers at this time, which ranged from having responsibility for apportioning rooms to those who were to lodge within the King's house, and 'know[ing] the King's mind when it shall please him to have any musick', to issuing the nightly call for the King's bed to be made, and having command of the King's barge and watermen.

By the eighteenth century, the Bedchamber (which was under the authority of the Groom of the Stole, and beyond the remit of the Gentlemen Ushers) had supplanted the Privy Chamber as the monarch's private enclave, and an adjacent Drawing Room became the main place of assembly at Court (in place of the Presence Chamber). The Privy Chamber and Presence Chamber then became little more than gathering spaces for visitors, largely indistinguishable from one another. Nevertheless, both chambers retained their separate staff of Gentlemen Ushers, who (though no longer closely involved with the day-to-day routines of the monarch) continued to serve a practical role overseeing these spaces on a day-to-day basis. Under Queen Victoria the Gentlemen Ushers of the Privy Chamber were still said to be in regular attendance on the Queen: they had "the honour of conducting Her Majesty in the absence of the higher officers" and were "the sole attendants in the Closet and the Chapel".

Over time, the role of the Gentleman Ushers became increasingly ceremonial and they exercised less supervision over the staff. In 1901, King Edward VII abolished the separate designations and began to appoint simply Gentleman Ushers in Ordinary.

=== Present day ===
Today an establishment of 10 Lady and Gentleman Ushers is maintained for attendance at royal events. Lady and Gentleman Ushers to His Majesty The King are generally appointed from retired military officers with, currently, two representing the Royal Navy, four representing the Army and four representing the Royal Air Force.

When on duty Ushers generally wear either Service uniform with a brassard displaying the royal cypher or morning or evening dress, depending on the occasion. They receive a modest honorarium for the upkeep of their orders of dress.

Among their duties, they act as ushers at Royal Garden Parties and Investitures as well as on State occasions. At royal weddings, funerals, coronations and other large church services they may be called upon to lead royal and other important guests in procession before conducting them to their seats. Occasionally they may be called upon to attend an event (e.g. a memorial service) as the monarch's representative.

The first Lady Usher of the Black Rod was appointed in 2017; the first Lady Usher in Ordinary was appointed in 2021.

Ushers retire at 70, when they may become Extra Lady or Gentleman Ushers.

== Particular Lady and Gentleman Ushers ==
Certain Gentleman Ushers have duties outside of the Royal Household, usually attached either as officers of an order of knighthood or to a House of Parliament. These are, in order of antiquity:

- The Gentleman Usher of the Black Rod, established c.1361 as an officer of the Order of the Garter, who also serves as secretary to the Lord Great Chamberlain and Doorkeeper of the House of Lords and (since 1971) Serjeant-at-Arms of the House of Lords. During the Tudor period, he was usually one of the senior members of the Royal Household, such as the Groom of the Stool; from the Restoration until 1765, Black Rod was the senior of the existing Gentleman Usher Daily Waiter, after which a new Daily Waiter was appointed to succeed the previous Black Rod. The first Lady Usher of the Black Rod, Sarah Clarke, was appointed as the new Black Rod on 17 November 2017; she formally took on the duties in February 2018. Lieutenant General Ed Davis currently holds the post.
- The Gentleman Usher of the White Rod, established as a hereditary dignity c.1373, who attended the Parliament of Scotland before its abolition in 1707. The heritable office was pronounced to be adjudgeable in 1758, and has been bought and sold several times since then. The position was revived to some degree in connection with the Parliament of Great Britain, and is now held by the Walker Trustees.
- The Lady Usher of the Green Rod, established 1714 as "Gentleman Usher", is the usher for the Scottish Order of the Thistle, currently Katherine Grainger, Baroness Grainger.
- The Irish Gentleman Usher of the Black Rod, established 1783, is the usher for the Irish Order of St Patrick; there have been no appointees to the office since 1933.
- The Gentleman Usher of the Scarlet Rod, established in 1725, is the usher for the British Order of the Bath. The present Scarlet Rod is Major General Susan Ridge.
- The Gentleman Usher to the Sword of State, established c.1837, is the usher who bears the Sword of State in ceremonial processions, currently General Sir Kevin O'Donoghue.
- The Gentleman Usher of the Blue Rod, established as 1882 as an "Officer of Arms" and made an usher in 1911, is the usher for the British Order of St Michael and St George; the post is currently held by Sir Jonathan Taylor.
- The Lady Usher of the Purple Rod, established in 1918 as "Gentleman Usher", is the usher for the Order of the British Empire; the post is currently held by Dame Amelia Fawcett.

Gentleman Ushers of the Black Rod also exist for New Zealand, Australia and its states, and Canada. In some respects, the Military Social Aides to the US President, who attend on some 2 to 4 afternoons a month to assist visitors to the White House, are an American and more recent equivalent to the Gentleman Ushers in Ordinary.
