= Company of Pikemen and Musketeers =

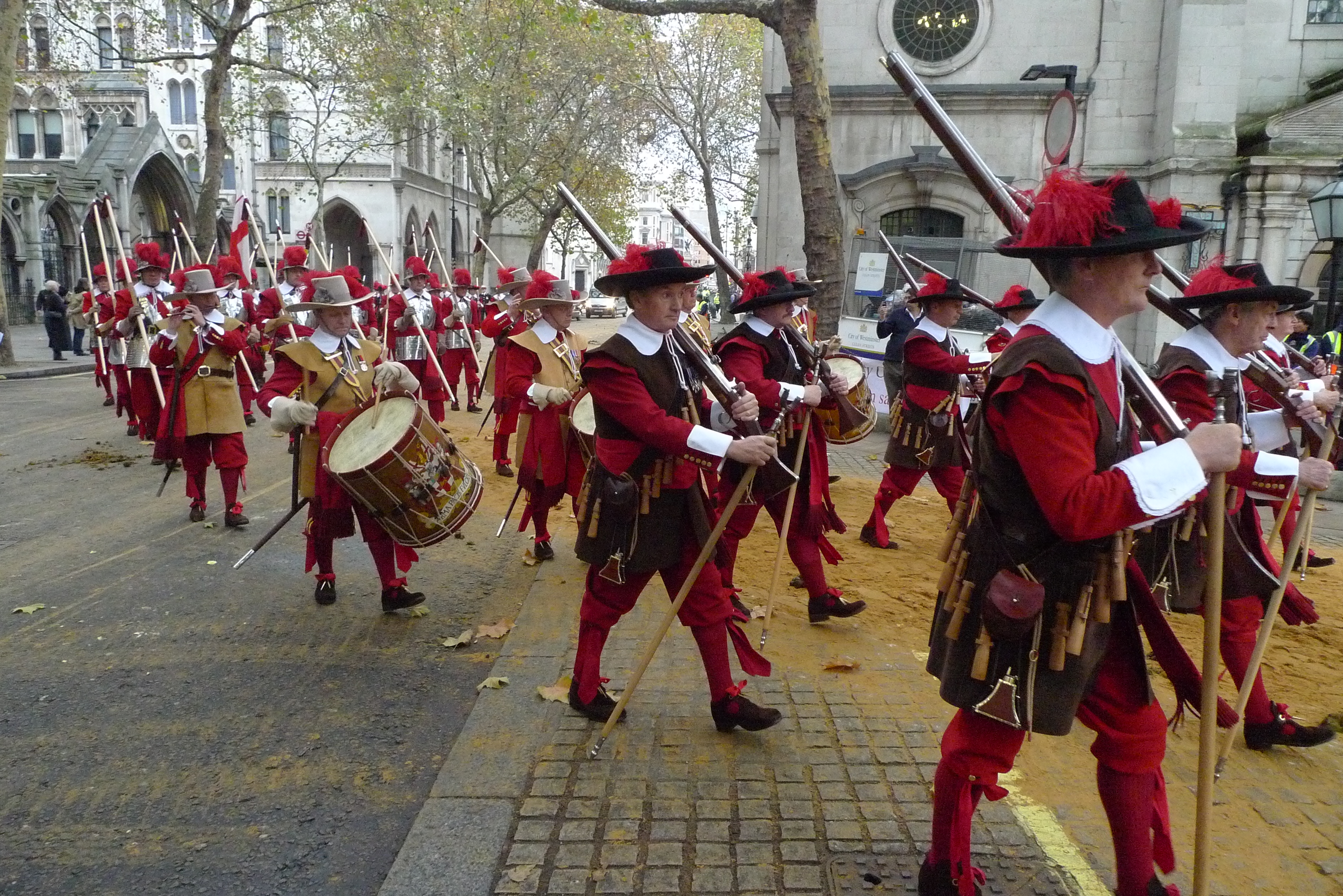
- Allegiance: United Kingdom
- Branch: British Army
- Role: Ceremonial unit

The Company of Pikemen and Musketeers is a ceremonial unit of the Honourable Artillery Company (HAC), which provides a regiment for the Army Reserve and is associated with the City of London. The HAC is the oldest regiment in the British Army, though not the most senior.

== Function ==
The Pikemen and Musketeers are dressed and equipped as members of the HAC would have been in the 1640s and are tasked with providing a ceremonial bodyguard and escort for the Lord Mayor of London. This includes escorting the state coach at the Lord Mayor's Show. and guards of honour and carpet guards for events at Mansion House and Guildhall.

The company also mounts guards for livery company functions in the city, at Royal Palaces, and for charitable and other events. It has taken part in the British Military Tattoo and the 500th anniversary of the Pontifical Swiss Guard in Rome. From time to time it visits Boston to take part in ceremonies with its sister organisation, the Ancient and Honorable Artillery Company of Massachusetts. It also provides period displays of 17th-century drill and music to show how the army of Charles I moved and defended itself.

In 1955 Queen Elizabeth II granted the company a Royal Warrant. This allows it to parade a maximum of 63 members, including six officers, at any one time – that being the size of a company in the 17th century. The Pikemen and Musketeers may only parade with a warrant signed by one of the company's three governors – The Lord Mayor of the City of London, the Colonel-Commandant of the HAC or the General Officer Commanding London District.

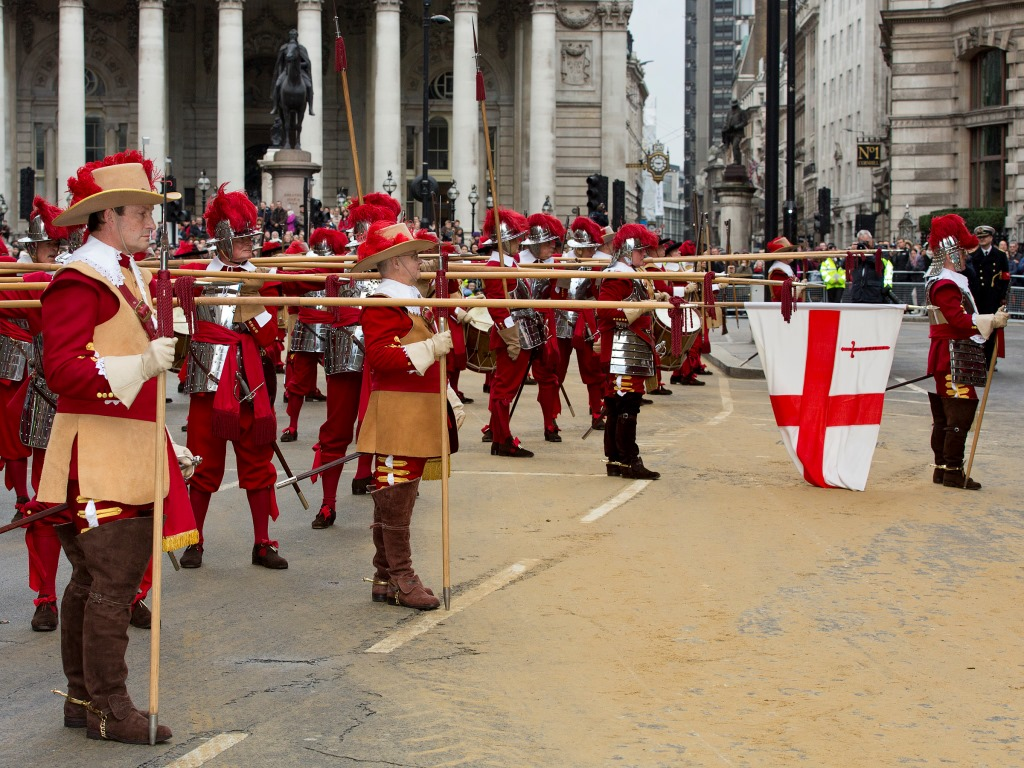
The Company of Pikemen and Musketeers salutes the new Lord Mayor of London at Mansion House at the conclusion of the Lord Mayor's Show 2014

== Uniform, arms and equipment ==
The uniform company members wear is identical to that worn by the HAC in the reign of Charles I of England. It comprises Venetian red tunics with white linen collars and cuffs and knee-length breeches. The seniority of officers and non-commissioned officers is signified by the amount of lace worn on collars and cuffs; the more lace the more senior the rank. Officers wear thigh boots and spurs.

Pikemen wear steel half-armour of back and breast plates with tassets (which hang from the breast plate to protect the thighs) and a morion (steel helmet). The combined weight is about 18 lbs. They are armed with swords and pikes. The latter would originally have been 18 feet long but for reasons of practicality, 12-foot pikes are used today. Pikes were used to repel cavalry charges and swords would have been used for personal protection in the event of a pike being broken in battle.

Musketeers wear a buff coat and wide-brimmed black felt hat. They are armed with a match-lock muskets and rest and wear a leather cross belt, from which are suspended 12 wooden gunpowder flasks known as chargers.

== Historical drill ==
The form of drill used is taken from a manual entitled Militaire Discipline first published in 1638 by Colonel William Bariffe, a member of the HAC and veteran artillerist who fought in the English Civil War under John Hampden. Although many of the orders are similar to those used in the Army today; one can, in ceremonies when they are present, hear original orders such as ‘Have a care’, ‘Assume a lazy posture’ and ‘Charge for horse and draw your sword’. Seventeenth century marches and music are provided by the company's own drums and fifes.

== Members ==
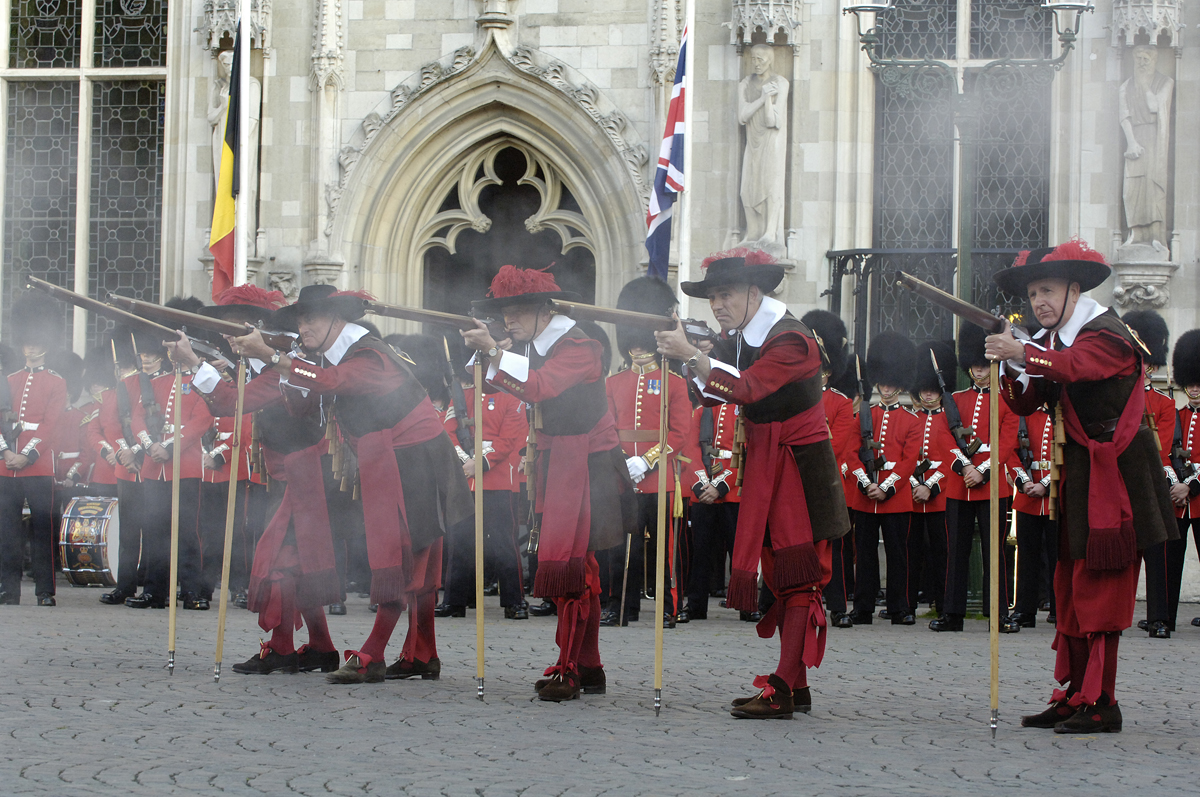
Musketeers giving fire in Bruges, Belgium during celebrations to mark the 350th anniversary of the founding of the Grenadier Guards there in 1656

Only veteran members of the HAC who have proven efficient service in the HAC's Army Reserve regiment are eligible for membership. All join in the lowest rank, regardless of any previous military rank held.

== History ==
The Company of Pikemen and Musketeers was formed in 1925 to take part in the first Royal Tournament at the Royal Agricultural Hall, Islington, Its first outing was deemed such a success that the demonstration team was kept together and developed and has been providing colour and pageantry at events in the City of London and elsewhere since.
