= Brian Jenkins (accountant) =

English chartered accountant and businessman (1935–2024)

Sir Brian Jenkins GBE KStJ FCA FBCS FRSA

Prior of England and the Islands, Order of Saint John
- In office 2004–2010

Deputy Chairman, Barclays Bank
- In office 2000–2004

Chairman, Woolwich Building Society/Woolwich plc
- In office 1995–2000

Lord Mayor of London
- In office 1991–1992

Personal details
- Born: Brian Garton Jenkins; 3 December 1935 Beckenham, Kent, England
- Died: 25 November 2024 (aged 88)

Sir Brian Garton Jenkins (3 December 1935 – 25 November 2024) was an English chartered accountant and businessman who was President of the Institute of Chartered Accountants in England and Wales in 1985–86, Lord Mayor of the City of London in 1991–92, and Chairman of Woolwich plc 1995–2000.

== Early life ==
Jenkins was born in Beckenham, Kent on 3 December 1935. He was educated at Tonbridge School (where he was a Scholar and leaving exhibitioner) and Trinity College, Oxford (where he was a State Scholar). Between school and university he was in the Army for National Service being commissioned into the Royal Artillery in Gibraltar.

== Business career ==
Jenkins joined Cooper Brothers in 1960, qualifying as a chartered accountant in 1963 gaining the 3rd Certificate of Merit. He was a partner in Coopers and Lybrand (C&L) (later PWC) from 1969 to 1994 and became a pioneer in computer auditing both in his firm and the accounting profession generally. He wrote the standard book "An Audit Approach to Computers" first published in 1978 and translated into five languages. Later he was chairman of the staff committee and head of audit.

In the profession, Jenkins served as chairman of the London Society of Chartered Accountants (1975–1976) and President of the Institute of Chartered Accountants in England and Wales (1985–1986). He was elected President of the British Computer Society for its 40th anniversary year 1997–98.

On retirement from C&L Jenkins joined the board of the Woolwich Building Society becoming chairman in 1995. In 1997 the Woolwich demutualised and joined the FTSE 100 as Woolwich plc. In 2000 the Woolwich shareholders accepted an offer from Barclays and Jenkins spent his last years in business as deputy chairman of Barclays, retiring in 2004.

During his career Jenkins served as a non-executive director of a number of organisations, including the Royal Ordnance Factories, Commission for the New Towns, Automobile Association, the Architectural Heritage Fund and London First. In 1995–1996 he was president and Chairman of the London Chamber of Commerce & Industry.

== Civic career ==
Jenkins' civic career started on his election as Alderman for the City of London Ward of Cordwainer in 1980. He served as Sheriff of London in 1987–1988. Elected 664th Lord Mayor of the City in 1991 his Mayoralty was particularly concerned in the response to the bombing of the Baltic Exchange, the location of the future European Central Bank (ECB) and the wider impact of the Single Market. Jenkins continued as an Alderman until 2004, chairing two aldermanic committees (General Purposes and Privileges). During this period there were important changes to the election process for aldermen. Jenkins was also active in the livery and Master of three Companies, Chartered Accountants, Merchant Taylors and Information Technologists (which received the livery during his Mayoralty). He was an Honorary President of the Society of Young Freemen.

== Charity work ==
Jenkins was particularly involved with three charities - Charities Aid Foundation(CAF, Community Service Volunteers(CSV) and the Order of St John and St John Ambulance. He became a Trustee of CAF in 1994 and was chairman from 1998 to 2003. During his chairmanship the Charity Bank was launched. His first involvement with CSV was as chairman for its Silver Jubilee Appeal in 1987–1988 which raised £1M. For his Lord Mayor's Appeal, Jenkins chose a new CSV venture "Learning Together" whereby university students gave time in schools to help students understand universities better and encourage suitable pupils to apply. As his last major appointment, Jenkins was elected in 2004 Prior of the Order of St John and chairman of St John Ambulance, posts he held until final retirement in 2010.

== Death ==
Jenkins died in Suffolk on 25 November 2024, at the age of 88.

== Honours and awards ==
- Knight Grand Cross of the Order of the British Empire (GBE) 1991
- Knight of Justice, Order of St John 1991
- Hon Fellow, Trinity College, Oxford 1992
- Hon Member, Baltic Exchange 1992
- Hon DSc, City University 1991
- Hon DLitt, London Guildhall University 1991
- Hon Fellow, Guildhall School of Music & Drama 1992
- Hon Bencher, Inner Temple 1992
- Companion, De Montfort University 1993
- Hon Fellow, Goldsmiths University of London 1998
- Centenary Award, Chartered Accountants Founding Services 1993

Civic offices
Preceded by Sir Alexander Graham	Lord Mayor of London; 1991–1992	Succeeded by Sir Francis McWilliams
