= Robert Bellinger =

British politician (1910-2002)

Sir Robert Bellinger GBE KStJ DL
- Bellinger in 1964

Gentleman Usher of the Purple Rod
- In office 1969–1985

Lord Mayor of London
- In office 1966–1967

Chairman, Kinloch Ltd
- In office 1946–1975

Personal details
- Born: Robert Ian Bellinger; 10 March 1910 Tetbury, Gloucestershire, England
- Died: 8 July 2002 (aged 92)

Sir Robert Ian Bellinger (10 March 1910 – 8 July 2002) was a British businessman and Lord Mayor of London.

Bellinger was born in Gloucestershire and raised in Fulham, London where he attended All Saints church school. Following his father's death he started work at the age of 14 as an office boy. He studied accountancy at the Regent Street Polytechnic before joining Kinloch, the wholesale grocery. He rose through the ranks to become chairman in 1946, a post which he held until retirement in 1975.

He joined the Worshipful Company of Broderers in 1946, and was elected onto the Court of Common Council seven years later. An Alderman in 1958 he became Sheriff of the City of London in 1962 and finally Lord Mayor (and with it, the ex officio title of Chancellor of City University) in 1966.

He was a Governor of the BBC and chairman of the Panel for Civil Service Manpower Review. From 1969 to 1985 he served as Gentleman Usher of the Purple Rod of the Order of the British Empire. In 1970, he was named as chairman of the National Savings Committee. In the 1970s he was a director of The Rank Organisation.

He was a keen sportsman, playing for Ealing Football Club in his youth, and was president of several Buckinghamshire sports clubs. He was also a longtime director of Arsenal Football Club from 1960 until 1996. On his retirement as a director of Arsenal he was appointed Life President, a title he held until his death in 2002.
