= Harold Gillett =

Lord Mayor of London (1958-1959)

Sir Harold Gillett Bt MC FCA

Lord Mayor of London
- In office 1958–1959

Personal details
- Born: Sydney Harold Gillett; 27 November 1890
- Died: 21 September 1976 (aged 85)

Coat of arms of Harold Gillett

Crest
A grey horse's head and neck erased Proper gorged with a coronet composed of six fleur-de-lys affixed to a circlet and chained Or.
Escutcheon
In front of a ship's helm Proper an early nineteenth century waistcoat Azure semée de lys and puffled Or on a chief of the second between two estoiles a balance of the first.
Motto
Vincit Omnia Veritas (Truth Conquers All Things)

Sir Sydney Harold Gillett, 1st Baronet (27 November 1890 – 21 September 1976) was Lord Mayor of London.

He was a chartered accountant. He was elected Sheriff of the City of London for 1952 and 631st Lord Mayor of London in 1958.

Awarded the Military Cross on 14 January 1916, Gillett was knighted on 12 June 1953.

He was president of the Baden-Powell House building committee of The Scout Association from 1953 until the building was finished in 1961. As a tribute to his contributions, the Scout Association has created a Sir Harold Gillett Memorial Fund to help pay the expenses of special needs Scouts and members in need to visit London and stay at the Baden-Powell House hostel. He was a member of the Council of the Corporation of Foreign Bondholders, from 1965 until his death in 1976

Gillett was created a baronet, of Bassishaw Ward in the City of London, on 4 December 1959. He died in September 1976, aged 85, and was succeeded in the baronetcy by his son Robin.

Baronetage of the United Kingdom
New title	Baronet (of Bassishaw Ward); 1959–1976	Succeeded by Robin Danvers Penrose Gillett
