= Gillett baronets =

Noble Title in United Kingdom

- Creation date: 1959
- Status: extant
- Motto: Vincit omnia veritas (Truth conquers all things)
- Arms: in front of a ship's helm Proper an early nineteenth century waistcoat Azure semée de lys and puffled Or on a chief of the second between two estoiles a balance of the first
- Crest: A grey horse's head and neck erased proper gorged with a coronet composed of six fleur-de-lys affixed to a circlet and chained or

The Gillett Baronetcy, of Bassishaw Ward in the City of London, is a title in the Baronetage of the United Kingdom. It was created on 4 December 1959 for Harold Gillett, Lord Mayor of London from 1958 to 1959. His son, the second Baronet, was Lord Mayor of London from 1976 to 1977.

== Gillett baronets, of Bassishaw Ward (1959) ==
- Sir (Sydney) Harold Gillett, 1st Baronet (1890–1976)
- Sir Robin Danvers Penrose Gillett, 2nd Baronet (1925–2009)
- Sir Nicholas Danvers Penrose Gillett, 3rd Baronet (born 1955)

The heir presumptive is the present holder's brother Christopher John Gillett (born 1958). The heir presumptive's heir apparent is his son Adam Holmes Gillett (born 1989).
