= Amelia Fawcett =

American-British business executive (born 1956)

Dame Amelia Fawcett DBE CVO
- Born: Amelia Chilcott Fawcett; 16 September 1956 (age 70); Boston, Massachusetts, U.S.
- Education: University of Virginia; Wellesley College
- Occupations: Chairman of Kinnevik AB in Stockholm; Lead Director for State Street Corporation in Boston, Massachusetts

Dame Amelia Chilcott Fawcett DBE CVO (born 16 September 1956) is an American-born British business executive who is currently Chairman of Kinnevik AB (Stockholm) and Lead Director of State Street Corporation (Boston, Massachusetts). Fawcett is the Chairman of Royal Botanic Gardens, Kew, a Governor of the Wellcome Trust and a Trustee of Project HOPE UK.

Born in Boston, Massachusetts, United States to Frederick J. Fawcett II and Betsey Chilcott Fawcett, Amelia Fawcett attended Brookwood School, Pingree School, Wellesley College and the University of Virginia School of Law.

Fawcett is a former Vice Chairman for Morgan Stanley. Prior posts include Chairman of the Standards Board for Alternative Investments (2011–2019), a non-executive member of the Board of HM Treasury (2012–2018), Chairman of The Prince of Wales's Charitable Foundation (2011–2018), Deputy Chairman and a Governor of the London Business School (2009–2018) and a Commissioner of the UK-US Fulbright Commission (2010–17).

She has been a member of the Court of the Bank of England (2004–09) and Deputy Chairman of the National Portrait Gallery (2003–11) as well as non-executive director (from 2007) and Chairman (2009–2013) for the British multimedia business Guardian Media Group plc and non-executive director of Millicom International Cellular SA (2015–16).

== Other activities ==
- Wellcome Trust, Member of the Board of Governors (since 2019)
- Royal Botanic Gardens, Kew, Chair of Board of Trustees (since 2019)
- Circular Bioeconomy Alliance, Chair of Board of Trustees (since 2023)

== Honours and awards ==
In 2006, Fawcett was named one of Fortune magazine's "50 most powerful women". In the New Year Honours 2002 Fawcett was appointed as a Commander of the Most Excellent Order of the British Empire.

In the New Year Honours 2010 Fawcett was elevated to the rank of Dame Commander of the Most Excellent Order of the British Empire for her services to the financial industry. In June 2018 she was appointed Commander of the Royal Victorian Order.

In 2004, she received the Prince of Wales' Ambassador award recognising responsible business activities. In July 2013, she was appointed the first Lady Usher of the Purple Rod.

Court offices
Preceded by Sir Alexander Graham, GBE	Lady Usher of the Purple Rod; 2013–present	Incumbent
