= Pangbourne College Boat Club =

British rowing club

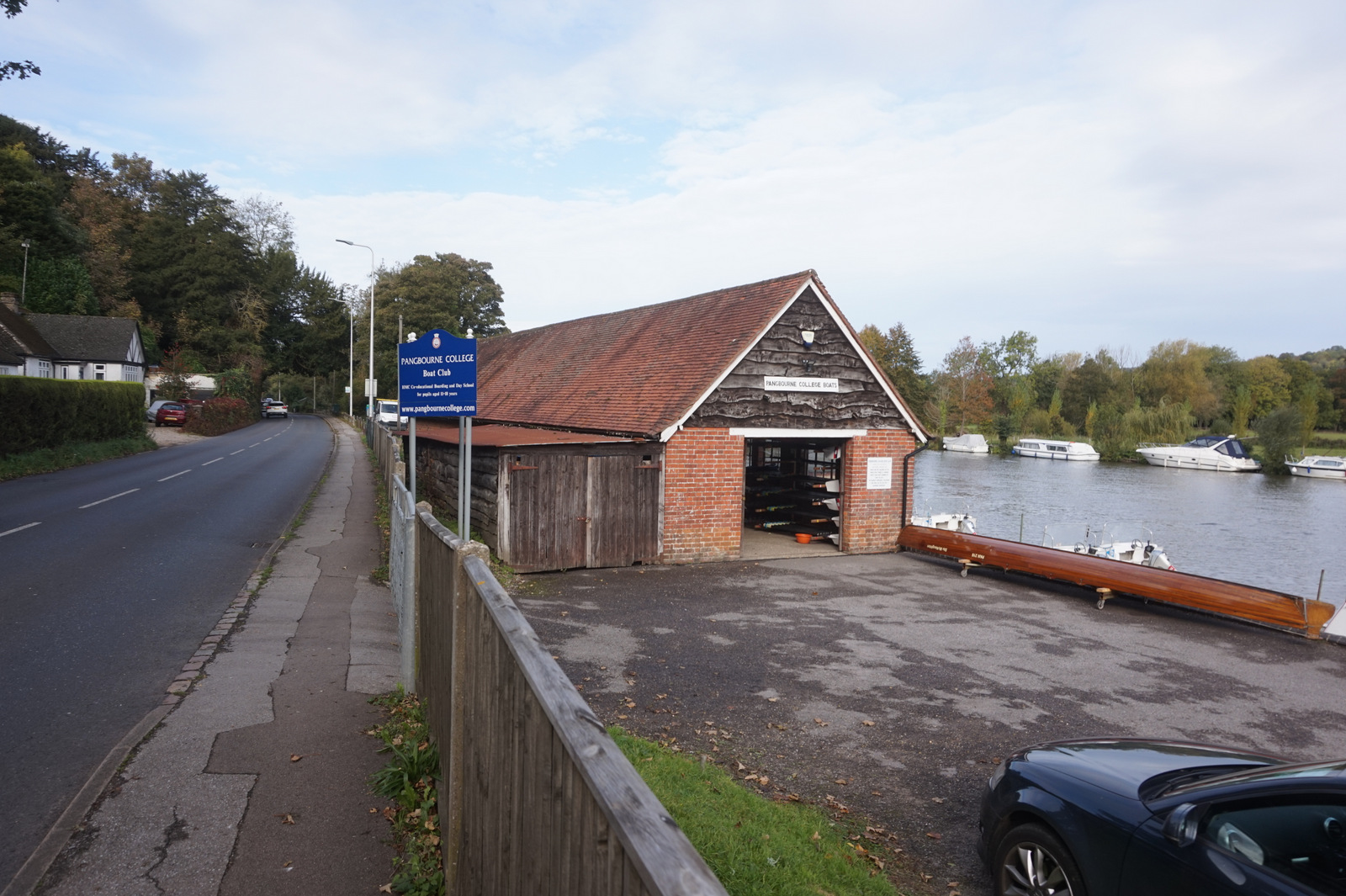

- Location: Pangbourne College Boathouse, Shooters Hill, Pangbourne, Berkshire, England
- Coordinates: 51.486954°N 1.093387°W
- Affiliations: British Rowing boat code - PAN
- Website: www.pangbourne.com/prospective-families/sport/rowing

Pangbourne College Boat Club is a rowing club based on the River Thames at Pangbourne College Boathouse, Shooters Hill, Pangbourne, Berkshire, England.

== History ==
The boat club is owned by Pangbourne College with rowing being a major school sport.

The club is a leading school rowing club and has won the prestigious Princess Elizabeth Challenge Cup at the Henley Royal Regatta on four occasions and has also won the Queen Mother Challenge Cup at the National Schools' Regatta.

== Honours ==
=== National Schools' Regatta ===
Year	Winning crew	1989	Royal Engineers’ Cup for Championship Coxless Fours	2003	Queen Mother Challenge Cup
2014	Non championship eights				

=== Henley Royal Regatta ===
Year	Winning crew
1963	Princess Elizabeth Challenge Cup+
1971	Princess Elizabeth Challenge Cup
1992	Princess Elizabeth Challenge Cup
2003	Princess Elizabeth Challenge Cup

+ as Nautical College, Pangbourne

=== British champions ===
Year	Winning crew/s
1974	Men J18 2-
1975	Men J16 2-
1983	Men J16 2+
1984	Men J18 2x, Men J18 4x
1992	Men J14 2x
2001	Women J16 2x

== See also ==
Rowing on the River Thames
