= Lindsay Ring =

Former Lord Mayor of London

Sir Lindsay Roberts Ring GBE
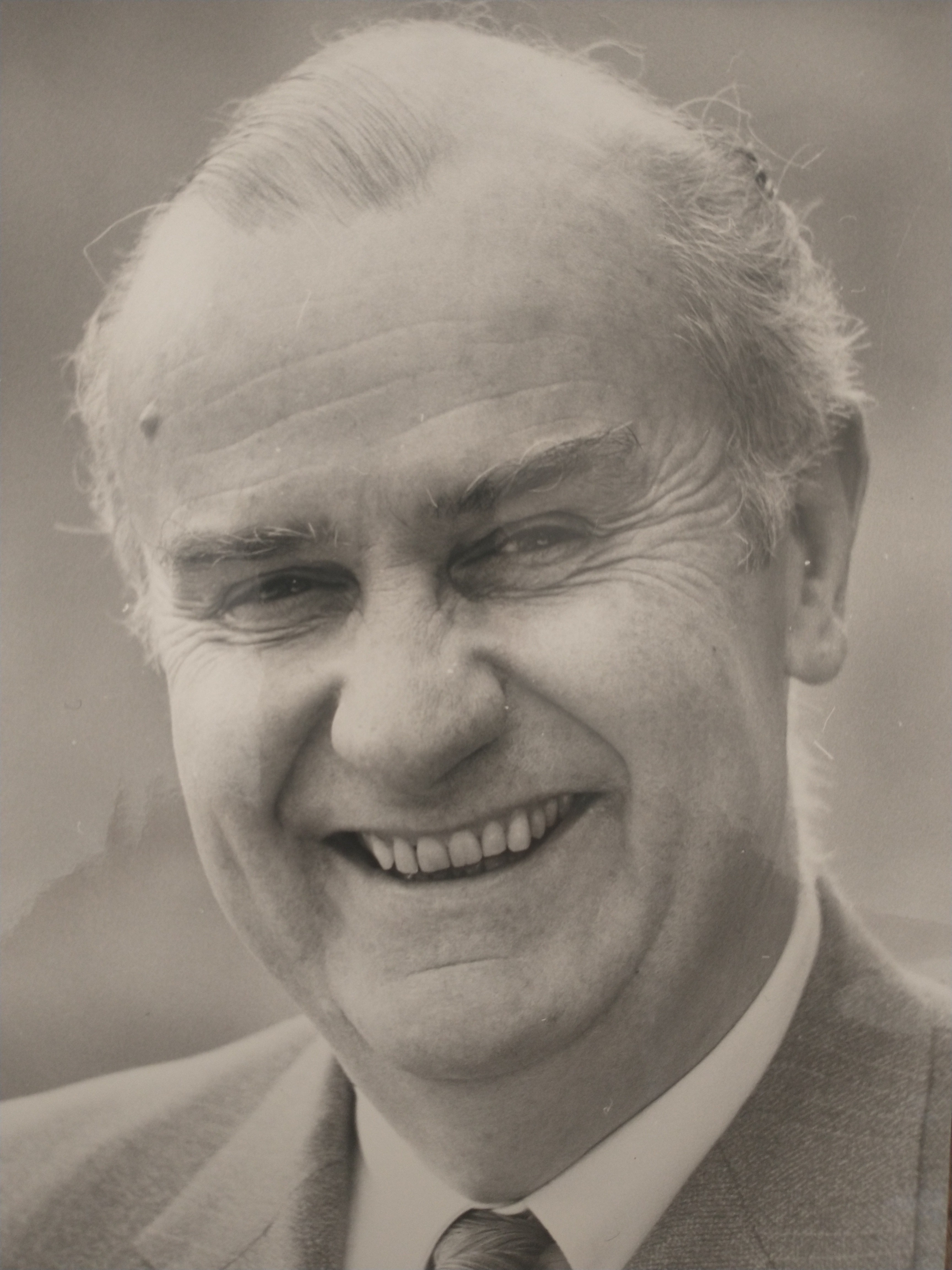
- Sir Lindsay Ring
- Born: 1 May 1914; Herne Hill, London, England
- Died: 10 August 1997 (aged 83)
- Occupation: Businessman
- Known for: Lord Mayor of London

Sir Lindsay Roberts Ring (1 May 1914 – 10 August 1997) was a British businessman who took back control of the catering firm Ring and Brymer (Birch's), which had previously been owned by his family.

After selling the business to Forte Holdings, he devoted himself to the activities of the City of London Corporation. After serving as councilman, Alderman and Sheriff of London he became Lord Mayor of London from 1975 to 1976.

== Early life ==
Lindsay Ring was born in Herne Hill, south London, the son of George Arthur Ring and his wife Helen Stedman. He went to school at Dulwich College, where he was captain of the school fencing team. After spending a year in Germany, he worked as a bank clerk in the City of London before joining the catering firm Ring and Brymer (Birch's), which had been founded by one of his ancestors, but was no longer controlled by the Ring family.

At the start of WWII he joined the Royal Army Service Corps and was evacuated from Dunkirk as a junior officer. After service in the Middle East, he was demobilised with the rank of major and rejoined Ring and Brymer (Birch's) as a junior member of staff.

== Career ==
Ring and Brymer (Birch's) was regarded as the most celebrated catering firm in the city of London. It had provided the catering for Coronation banquets over two centuries, as well as catering for Number 10 Downing Street, for Ascot Racecourse events, for Henley Royal Regatta and for livery dinners in the City of London. During WWI the family had lost control of the business and Ring's father had been declared bankrupt. Having rejoined the company in 1945, Lindsay Ring rose through the ranks and by the early 1950s he had regained control of the business. There followed an expansion of the business with additional catering franchises including Twickenham Stadium and the Farnborough Airshow. In 1962 he sold the firm to Sir Charles Forte and was given a seat on the board of Forte Holdings.

Thereafter he became involved increasingly with the affairs of the City of London Corporation. He was elected councilman for the Bishopsgate ward in 1964, served as Alderman for the Vintry ward from 1968 to 1984.

== Appointments and honours ==
He was elected master of the Armourers and Brasiers Company in 1972. and was Sherriff of London between 1967 and 1968.In 1975 he was appointed Knight Grand Cross of the Order of the British Empire (GBE), and later that year he became Lord Mayor of London, choosing Age Concern as the theme for his mayoral year. He was appointed Honorary Colonel of 151 Regiment, Royal Corps of Transport, T.A.V.R. in 1977.

== Family ==
He married Hazel Nichols in 1940 while on 48-hour leave from his unit. They did not see each other again for five years. They had two sons and a daughter. He died on 10 August 1997.

Honorary titles
Preceded by Sir Murray Fox	Lord Mayor of London; 1975–1976	Succeeded by Sir Robin Gillett
