= Patrick Derham =

Patrick Derham OBE

Headmaster, Westminster School
- In office 2014–2020
- Preceded by: Stephen Spurr

Personal details
- Born: Patrick Sibley Jan Derham; 23 August 1959 (age 67)
- Education: Pangbourne College
- Alma mater: University of Cambridge (MA)
- Website: twitter.com/PatrickDerham

Patrick Sibley Jan Derham OBE (born 23 August 1959) is a headmaster and history teacher who retired after his tenure as Headmaster of Westminster School from 2014 to 2020. He currently sits on the advisory board of the G12++ certificate, which is being developed by Alsama Project.

== Education ==
Derham was educated aboard the permanently moored Arethusa II and Pangbourne College before gaining a First Class Degree in History (1982) at Pembroke College, Cambridge, specialising in the study of Ireland.

== Career ==
Derham previously served as Headmaster of Solihull School (1996–2001) and Rugby School (2001–2014), when he also served as a school governor of the Lawrence Sheriff School, and is a trustee of Gladstone's Library.

=== Views ===
Derham is known for his strong views on independent schools in the United Kingdom and makes occasional press appearances to argue his case, including inviting those from the other side of the debate to speak at the school. At Westminster, he introduced the PISA tests, introduced King’s Scholarships for Girls and announced plans to open 6 schools in China from 2020, although these plans drew criticism from many of the students, as the schools will teach the Chinese Communist curriculum, as opposed to an international curriculum normally taught by international schools. Steve Tsang, director of the China Institute at SOAS, University of London, was quoted in the Financial Times as saying: “I think they have no idea what they’re dealing with [...] If you set up a school in China, they will have a party secretary superintending the whole school and the party secretary will be responsible for political education”. The issue was re-opened when The Times published an article, quoting Professor Edward Vickers of Kyushu University, accusing the school (and King's College School who have similar plans) of "helping Chinese teach propaganda". He edited a book, Loyal Dissent - a story of some of those who studied at Westminster.

Derham also has strong views on widening access to independent schools. He set up the Arnold Foundation in 2003, during his tenure as headmaster at Rugby School, which provides financial support for students from lower socio-economic backgrounds.

Derham is also a supporter of Alsama Project in Lebanon, which operates four education centres for refugees in Beirut, and sits on the advisory board of the G12++ certificate, a high school-equivalent certificate tailor-made for refugees. Speaking about the G12++, he is quoted by Alsama as saying: 'Of all the projects that I have been involved with, this is the one that has the potential to make the greatest difference.'

=== Awards and honours ===
Derham was appointed Officer of the Order of the British Empire in the 2018 Birthday Honours for services to education.

== Personal life ==
Derham met his wife Alison at Cambridge where she was studying English and Drama at Homerton College, Cambridge. They have two adult children. In 2019, he announced that he would retire in 2020.
