= Robin Gillett =

Sir Robin Gillett Bt GBE RD DL FRCM

Gentleman Usher of the Purple Rod
- In office 1985–2000

Lord Mayor of London
- In office 1976–1977

Personal details
- Born: Robin Danvers Penrose Gillett; 9 November 1925
- Died: 21 April 2009 (aged 83)

Sir Robin Danvers Penrose Gillett, 2nd Baronet (9 November 1925 – 21 April 2009) was Lord Mayor of London 1976–77. He was also Gentleman Usher of the Purple Rod 1985 – 30 November 2000.

== Family and education ==
Born in London on Lord Mayor's Day, as it then was, on 9 November 1925, Robin Gillett was the only child of Captain Sir Harold Gillett, 1st Baronet MC FCA, who was Lord Mayor of London, 1958–59. He was educated at Pangbourne 1939–43, and Hill Crest School.

He married twice: firstly, in 1950, Elizabeth Marion Grace (died 1997), the elder daughter of John Findlay, JP, of Busby House, Lanarkshire. They had two children: Nicholas (born 1955) and Christopher (the singer, born 1958). He married secondly Alwynne Winifred Hay (1931-2021), daughter of James MacDonald Hay, on 8 July 2000. Lady Hay had previously been married to John Lant (div.1954) and Judge Albert Edward Cox (1916-1992).

== Naval career ==
He was an Elder Brother of Trinity House, and Admiral of the City Livery Yacht Club. From 1984-1985, he was Commodore of the [Royal London Yacht Club].

Served Canadian Pacific Steamships, 1943–60; Master Mariner 1951; Staff Commander 1957.

After the Nautical College he went to sea as a cadet with Canadian Pacific Steamships Ltd with which he served on North Atlantic, Mediterranean and Russian convoys. He remained with Canadian Pacific after the war, obtaining his Master Mariner's Certificate in 1951.

In 1950 he joined the Royal Naval Reserve. From 1953 he served for a year in the Persian Gulf in the frigate HMS Flamingo doing RNR training.

In 1957 he became the youngest Staff Commander of the Canadian Pacific flagship the Empress of Scotland, a rank he held until he left the sea in August 1960 having been recruited while serving in the Empress of Britain.

In 1971, he was appointed an Honorary Commander in the Royal Naval Reserve.

== Lloyd's and the City ==
On leaving the sea he joined the Lloyd's broking firm of Bevington, Vaizey and Foster and after training commenced as Administration Manager there.

In 1965 he was elected to the Common Council of the City of London and also as an underwriting member of Lloyd's. He was elected an Alderman in 1969 and Sheriff of the City of London for 1973. He was knighted GBE in 1976.

On 29 September 1976 he was elected as Lord Mayor of London and on 12 November he entered the Mansion House. Unfortunately his father had died eight days before he was elected. Of the 648 Lord Mayors that preceded him, only six had actually succeeded their fathers in a direct line and not one had succeeded in becoming Lord Mayor during his father's lifetime. There followed a very hectic year at the Mansion House, the crowning event of which was the Silver Jubilee of Queen Elizabeth II. At the end of the mayoralty, Gillett returned to his then home in Knightsbridge and back to his firm after a rest period.

He was appointed Gentleman Usher of the Purple Rod of the Order of the British Empire from 1985 to 2000.

== Chronology ==
- Elder Brother of Trinity House
- Fellow and Founder Member, Nautical Institute City of London (Ward of Bassishaw): Common Councilman 1965–69
- Alderman 1969–96
- Sheriff 1973
- One of HM Lieutenants for City of London, 1975
- Chairman Civil Defence Committee, 1967–68
- President, City of London Civil Defence Instructors Association, 1967–78
- Vice-president, City of London Centre, St John Ambulance Association
- President, National Waterways Transport Association, 1979–83
- Dep. Commonwealth President, Royal Life Saving Society, 1981–96
- Chairman Council, Maritime Volunteer Service, 1998–2000, Governor, 2000–
- Vice-chairman, PLA, 1979–84
- Master, Honourable Company of Master Mariners, 1979–80
- Trustee, National Maritime Museum, 1982–92
- Chairman of Governors, Pangbourne College, 1978–92
- Chancellor, City University, 1976–77
- FIAM (Pres., 1980–84; Gold Medal, 1982)
- FRCM 1991. Hon. DSc City, 1976.
- Gentleman Usher of the Purple Rod, 1985–2000
- Gold Medal, Administrative Management Soc., USA, 1983
- Denmark : Commander, Order of Dannebrog, 1974
- Peru : Grand Cross of Municipal Merit (Lima), 1977
- United Kingdom : KStJ 1977 (OStJ 1974)
- Zaire : Officer, National Order of the Leopard, Zaire, 1973

Author: A Fish out of Water 2001. Dogwatch Doggerel 2004.

== Arms ==
Coat of arms of Robin Gillett

Crest
A grey horse's head and neck erased Proper gorged with a coronet composed of six fleur-de-lys affixed to a circlet and chained Or.
Escutcheon
In front of a ship's helm Proper an early nineteenth century waistcoat Azure semée de lys and puffled Or on a chief of the second between two estoiles a balance of the first.
Motto
Vincit Omnia Veritas (Truth Conquers All Things)

Baronetage of the United Kingdom
Preceded by Harold Gillett	Baronet (of Bassishaw Ward); 1976–2009	Succeeded by Nicholas Danvers Penrose Gillett
Honorary titles
Preceded by Sir Lindsay Ring	Lord Mayor of London; 1976–1977	Succeeded by Sir Peter Vanneck
