= Hugh Bidwell =

British businessman and Lord Mayor of London

Sir Hugh Bidwell GBE KStJ KCSG

Chairman, British Invisibles
- In office 1991–1994

Lord Mayor of London
- In office 1989–1990

Chief Executive, Allied Lyons Eastern
- In office 1985–1991

Chairman, Gill & Duffus Foods Ltd
- In office 1984–1985

Chairman, Pearce Duff & Co Ltd
- In office 1970–1984

Personal details
- Born: Hugh Charles Philip Bidwell; 1 November 1934
- Died: 7 December 2013 (aged 79)

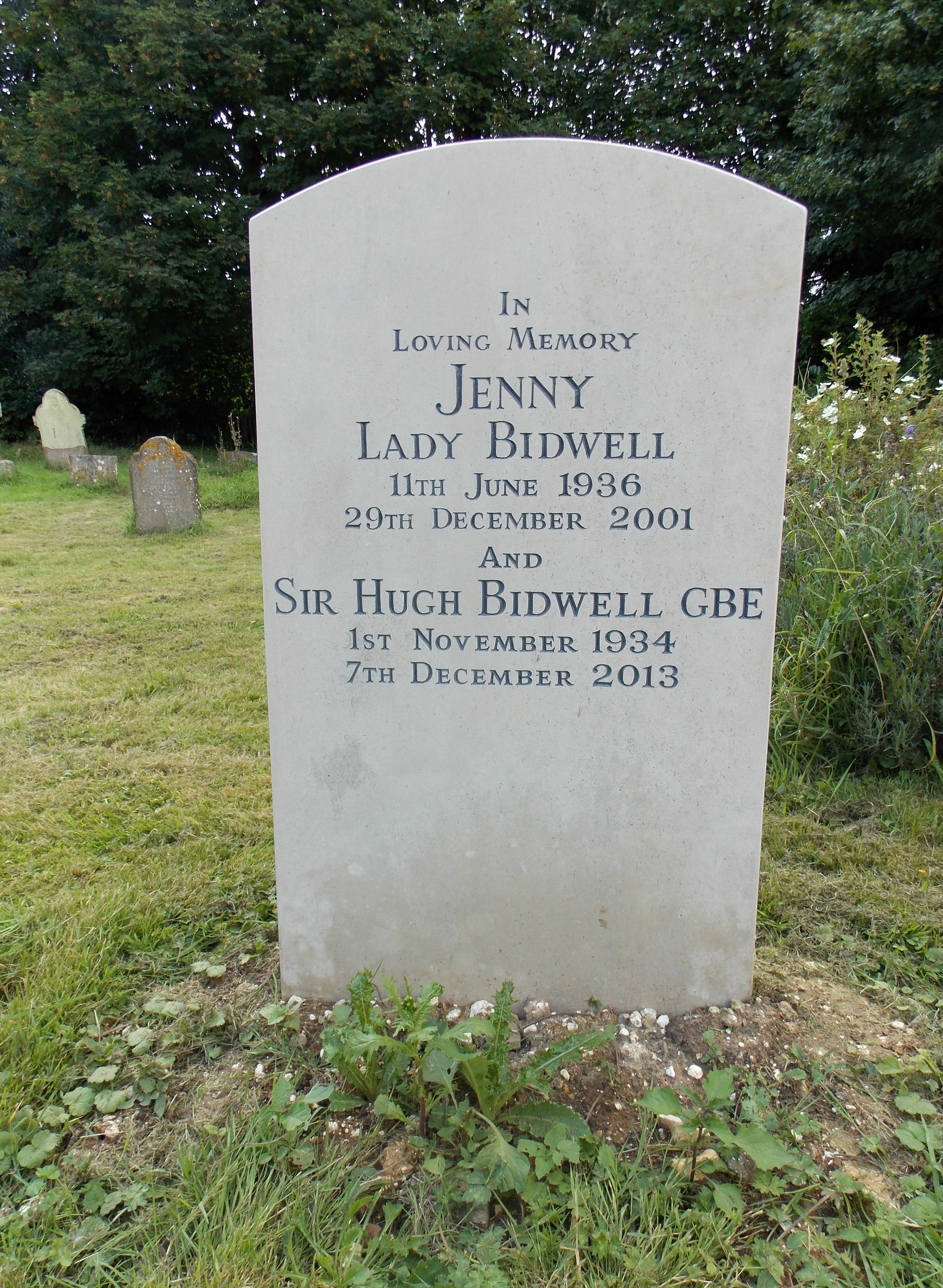
Headstone to Sir Hugh and Lady Jenny Bidwell in the cemetery of the Church of the Holy Cross, Goodnestone, Kent

Sir Hugh Charles Philip Bidwell (1 November 1934 – 7 December 2013) was a British businessman and the 662nd Lord Mayor of London in 1989–90. Prior to his election as mayor Bidwell was an alderman of the Billingsgate ward from 1979 to 1996, and a sheriff of the City of London in 1986. Bidwell was appointed a Knight Grand Cross of the Order of the British Empire (GBE) on his election as mayor.

Bidwell was born in 1934, the son of a wine importer, and was schooled at Stonyhurst. Undergoing National Service in the East Surrey Regiment in 1953, he served in Nyasaland, Kenya with the 1st Btn King's African Rifles.

Bidwell began working in the food industry with the breakfast cereal maker Viota, and became a director of Viota in 1962. Bidwell was subsequently chairman of the food company Pearce Duff, headed the food arm of Gill & Duffus, and joined Allied Lyons in 1985.

Bidwell was married twice, first to Jenifer Webb in 1962, with whom he had two sons, and a daughter. Webb died in 2001. Bidwell married for a second time to Priscilla Pode (née Hunter). His wife and three children survived him at his death.

Bidwell was buried with his first wife in the cemetery of Holy Cross Church, Goodnestone, Kent.

Civic offices
Preceded by Sir Christopher Collett	Lord Mayor of London; 1989–1990	Succeeded by Sir Alexander Graham
