= Alexander Graham (underwriter) =

English politician and mayor (born 1938)

Sir Alexander Graham GBE JP FRSA

Lord Mayor of London
- In office 1990–1991

Managing director, Norman Frizzell & Partners Ltd
- In office 1973–1990

Personal details
- Born: Alexander Michael Graham; 27 September 1938 (age 88)
- Occupation: Underwriter

Sir Alexander Michael Graham (born 27 September 1938) is a former Lord Mayor of London. He served from 1990 to 1991.

Graham has also served as an alderman and as Sheriff of the City of London. From 2000 to 2013, he served as Gentleman Usher of the Purple Rod.

He went to St. Paul's School London from 1951 to 1956

Before assuming the office of Lord Mayor, he was made Knight Grand Cross of the Order of the British Empire (GBE) with effect from 9 October 1990.

He is married to Lady Carolyn Graham and they have three daughters.

His brother is Lieutenant General Sir Peter Graham, a former General Officer Commanding Scotland.

Civic offices
Preceded by Sir Hugh Bidwell	Lord Mayor of London; 1990–1991	Succeeded by Sir Brian Jenkins
