= Lady Usher of the Purple Rod =

Officer of the Order of the British Empire

The usher of the Purple Rod, formally known as the Gentleman Usher of the Purple Rod or Lady Usher of the Purple Rod, is the Usher to the Most Excellent Order of the British Empire, established in 1917 and effective since 1918.

The Gentleman Usher is appointed by the Sovereign and holds the office during good behaviour. No specific functions are assigned to the Gentleman Usher but the Statutes require that the Usher shall "execute diligently whatever the Sovereign or Grand Master may be pleased to command touching the interests of the said Order".

The Statutes of the Order provide that the Gentleman Usher "shall wear around his neck pendent to a purple riband an escocheon of gold enamelled on a field purpure a representation of Britannia surrounded by the circle and motto of the Order and surmounted by an Imperial Crown, and that he shall carry the Purple Rod of the Order, having at the top an escrol thereon the motto of the Order surmounted by a representation of Britannia."

== Officeholders from 1918 ==
- 12 April 1918 – 23 August 1952: Sir Frederic G. Kenyon
- 30 September 1952 – 2 December 1960: Sir Ernest Gowers
- 2 December 1960 – 8 April 1969: Malcolm Eve, 1st Baron Silsoe
- 8 April 1969 – 1985: Sir Robert Bellinger
- 15 March 1985 – 30 November 2000: Sir Robin Gillett, 2nd Baronet
- 30 November 2000 – 23 July 2013: Sir Alexander Graham
- 23 July 2013 – present Dame Amelia Fawcett (first Lady Usher)

== See also ==
- Gentleman Usher, ushers of other orders of chivalry
