= Brookwood School =

Location
- One Brookwood Road; Manchester, Massachusetts, 01944; United States; 42.572176°N 70.797036°W

Information
- Type: Private Co-educational
- Established: 1956
- Founder: Pip Cutler
- Head of school: Jon Bartlett
- Grades: Pre-K – 8
- Campus size: 30 acres
- Campus type: Suburb, Woodland
- Colors: green, white
- Mascot: Heron
- Tuition: $18,500 - $43,700 (2024)
- Website: www.brookwood.edu

Brookwood School, founded in 1956, is an independent, non-denominational, co-educational, non-profit day school located on a 30-acre wooded campus in Manchester-by-the-Sea, Massachusetts.

== History ==
Brookwood School was founded in December 1956 and incorporated as The Essex Country Day School; the name was changed to Brookwood School in January 1957. The school opened in September 1957 on a converted estate stable with

Since its founding, Brookwood has grown into a 30-acre wooded campus with a robust program from Early Childhood through Grade 8. The school, offers cross-cultural education and international collaboration under the auspices of the National Association of Independent Schools (NAIS) Challenge 20/20 program.

== School structure ==
Serving students from Early Childhood (age 3) through Grade 8

== Campus ==
The campus consists of 30 acres (12 ha) of playing fields and academic buildings, surrounded by natural woodlands, slightly in-land from the northern shore of Massachusetts Bay. The upper school students are housed in the wing that was originally the stables. Chubb Creek flows through the school property, lond with Cutler pond, which rarely, can hold people for skating in winter.

== Notable alumni ==
- Nat Faxon – actor, comedian, and Academy Award–winning screenwriter.
- Amelia Fawcett – business executive and former Morgan Stanley vice-chair.
- Rufus Gifford – U.S. Ambassador to Denmark and U.S. Chief of Protocol.

== Former headteachers ==
- Philip “Pip” Cutler serving as founding headmaster; the first enrollment comprised 64 students in Nursery–1st grade.
- Cutler retired in 1973. His successors were: John Ogden (Headmaster until 1979), A. Marshall “Buck” Lawton (1980–1992), and John C. Peterman (1992–2015). In 2015, Laura Caron became Head of School.
- In October 2019, Brookwood announced that Caron would step down at the end of the 2019–20 academic year. Following Caron’s departure, Nancy Y. Evans served as Interim Head of School through July 31, 2021.
- In July 2021, Jonathan “Jon” Bartlett was appointed Brookwood’s sixth Head of School and remains in that position as of 2025.
