= Murray Fox =

British chartered surveyor and Lord Mayor of London

Sir Murray Fox GBE DL FRICS

Lord Mayor of London
- In office 1974–1975

Personal details
- Born: Henry Murray Fox; 7 June 1912
- Died: 9 November 1999 (aged 87)

Sir Henry Murray Fox (7 June 1912 – 9 November 1999) was a British chartered surveyor who was Lord Mayor of London from 1974 to 1975.

The son of Sir Sidney Fox, Sheriff of the City of London for 1952–53, and Molly Button, Murray Fox was educated at Malvern College and Emmanuel College, Cambridge. He joined Hallett, Fox & White, chartered surveyors, in 1935, subsequently becoming its senior partner; the firm later merged with Chesterton & Son.

A member of the Court of Common Council of the City of London between 1963 and 1982, he was Alderman for Bread Street Ward from 1966 to 1982. He was Sheriff of the City of London for 1971–72, Lord Mayor of London for 1974–75, and one of HM Lieutenants for the City of London from 1976 to 1983. He was also master of the Worshipful Company of Wheelwrights and of the Worshipful Company of Coopers. He was appointed a GBE in 1974.

Fox married Helen Isabella Margaret, daughter of J. B. Crichton; they had a son and two daughters. Lady Fox died in 1986.
