= Worshipful Company of Woolmen =

Livery company of the City of London

The Worshipful Company of Woolmen is one of the livery companies in the City of London. It is known to have existed in 1180, making it one of the older livery companies of the city. It was officially incorporated in 1522. The company's original members were concerned with the winding and selling of wool; presently, a connection is retained by the company's support of the field of wool production and related fields. However, the company is now primarily a charitable institution.

The company ranks forty-third in the order of precedence of the livery companies. Its motto is Lana Spes Nostra, Latin for "Wool Is Our Hope".

A long-established event celebrating a City of London Freemen’s ancient “right” to bring sheep to market over the Thames toll free is in modern times organised annually by the Woolmen. The Sheep Drive takes place on Southwark Bridge, and raises money for the Company's charitable endeavours, as well as The Lord Mayor’s Appeal.
