= List of knights grand cross of the Order of the British Empire =

Below is a list of knights grand cross of the Order of the British Empire from the Order's creation in 1917 to the present day. The names and titles of recipients are given as at the time of their appointment or promotion to Knight Grand Cross. The date of the award, as given in the announcement The London Gazette, is included in brackets after the names.

| Name | Date | Division | Citation | Notes | References |
|---|---|---|---|---|---|
| Field Marshal His Royal Highness The Duke of Connaught and Strathearn | 4 June 1917 | | "For Services in connection with the War". | | |
| The Viscount Gladstone | 4 June 1917 | | Chairman of the War Refugees Committee. "For Services in connection with the War". | | |
| The Lord Emmott | 4 June 1917 | | Director of the War Trade Department. "For Services in connection with the War". | | |
| The Lord Moulton | 4 June 1917 | | Director-General of Explosive Supplies, Ministry of Munitions. "For Services in connection with the War". | | |
| The Lord Sydenham of Combe | 4 June 1917 | | "For Services in connection with the War". | | |
| The Lord Cunliffe | 4 June 1917 | | Governor of the Bank of England. "For Services in connection with the War". | | |
| The Honourable Arthur Stanley | 4 June 1917 | | Chairman, British Red Cross Society and Order of St. John of Jerusalem in England. "For Services in connection with the War". | | |
| Sir Eric Campbell Geddes | 4 June 1917 | | First Lord of the Admiralty, lately Inspector-General of Transportation Headquarter Staff, France. "For Services in connection with the War". | | |
| Sir Arthur Pearson, Bt. | 4 June 1917 | | Chairman of the Blinded Sailors and Soldiers Care Committee. "For Services in connection with the War". | | |
| Mr Justice Sankey | 4 June 1917 | | Joint Chairman of the Advisory Committee as to Internment and Repatriation. "For Services in connection with the War". | | |
| Mr Justice Younger | 4 June 1917 | | Joint Chairman of the Advisory Committee as to Internment and Repatriation. "For Services in connection with the War". | | |
| Alexander McDowell | 4 June 1917 | | Joint Director for Ireland, Ministry of Munitions. "For Services in connection with the War". | | |
| The Lord Chelmsford | 4 December 1917 | | Viceroy and Governor-General of India. "For Services in connection with the War". | | |
| The Lord Willingdon | 4 December 1917 | | Governor of Bombay. "For Services in connection with the War". | | |
| Honorary Colonel His Highness The Nizam of Hyderabad | 4 December 1917 | | "For Services in connection with the War". | | |
| Honorary Colonel His Highness The Maharaja of Mysore | 4 December 1917 | | "For Services in connection with the War". | | |
| Honorary Major-General His Highness The Maharaja of Gwalior | 4 December 1917 | | "For Services in connection with the War". | | |
| Lieutenant-General His Highness The Maharaja of Jammu and Kashmir | 1 January 1918 | | "In recognition of Services rendered by the Native States of India during the War". | | |
| Major-General His Highness The Maharaja of Jaipur | 1 January 1918 | | "In recognition of Services rendered by the Native States of India during the War". | | |
| Lieutenant-Colonel His Highness The Maharaja of Kotah | 1 January 1918 | | "In recognition of Services rendered by the Native States of India during the War". | | |
| Lieutenant-Colonel His Highness The Mahajara of Patiala | 1 January 1918 | | "In recognition of Services rendered by the Native States of India during the War". | | |
| Sir Thomas Dunlop, Bt. | 1 January 1918 | | Lord Provost of Glasgow. "For services in connection with the War". | | |
| William Henry Ellis | 1 January 1918 | | Master Cutler of Sheffield. "For services in connection with the War". | | |
| Sir Richard Charles Garton | 1 January 1918 | | Founder of the Garton Foundation for Promoting the Study of International Policy and Economics; Honorary Treasurer of the Trust Fund 'Committee of Queen Mary's Hostel. "For services in connection with the War". | | |
| Sir David Harrel | 1 January 1918 | | Chairman, of the Committee on Production. "For services in connection with the War". | | |
| Sir Robert Arundell Hudson | 1 January 1918 | | Treasurer and Financial Director of the Joint Committee of the British Red Cross Society and the Order of St. John of Jerusalem in England. "For services in connection with the War". | | |
| Colonel Sir Arthur Hamilton Lee | 1 January 1918 | | Director-General of Food Production. "For services in connection with the War". | | |
| Sir William Plender | 1 January 1918 | | "For services in connection with the War". | | |
| General Sir Francis Reginald Wingate | 1 January 1918 | | His Majesty's High Commissioner for Egypt. "For services in connection with the War". | | |
| Basil Zaharoff | 19 April 1918 (invested) | Honorary | | Presented by Viscount Bertie of Thame, British Ambassador to France | |
| Arthur David Brooks | 3 June 1918 | | Lord Mayor of Birmingham. "For services in connection with the War". | | |
| Sir William Edmund Garstin | 3 June 1918 | | Member of the Council of the British Red Cross Society and of the Joint War Committee of the British Red Cross Society and the Order of St. John of Jerusalem in England; Member of the V.A.D. Advisory Committee and of the V.A.D. Selection Board. "For services in connection with the War". | | |
| Sir Charles Blair Gordon | 3 June 1918 | | Vice-Chairman of the British War Mission to the United States of America. "For services in connection with the War". | | |
| The Earl of Plymouth | 3 June 1918 | | Sub-Prior of the Order of St. John of Jerusalem in England; Member of the Joint War Committee of the British Red Cross Society and the Order of St. John of Jerusalem in England. "For services in connection with the War". | | |
| The Very Reverend Thomas Banks Strong | 3 June 1918 | | Dean of Christ Church, Oxford; late Vice-Chancellor of the University of Oxford. "For services in connection with the War". | | |
| The Reverend John Pentland Mahaffy | 3 June 1918 | | Provost of Trinity College, Dublin. "For services in connection with the War". | | |
| The Earl of Liverpool | 3 June 1918 | | Governor-General and Commander-in-Chief of the Dominion of New Zealand. "For services in or for the Oversea Dominions, Colonies and Protectorates, in connection with the War.". | | |
| Lieutenant-General Sir Herbert Scott Gould Miles | 3 June 1918 | | Lately Governor and Commander-in-Chief of the City and Garrison of Gibraltar. "For services in or for the Oversea Dominions, Colonies and Protectorates, in connection with the War." | | |
| Lieutenant-General Sir Henry Crichton Sclater | 1 January 1919 | Military | "For valuable services rendered in connection with the War". | | |
| Walter Durnford | 8 January 1919 | Civil | Provost of King's College, Cambridge. "For services in connection with the war". | | |
| Sir Charles Edward Ellis | 8 January 1919 | Civil | Member of Ministry of Munitions Council and Representative of the Ministry in France and Italy; previously Director-General of Ordnance Supply; late Managing Director, Messrs. John Brown & Co., Ltd. "For services in connection with the war". | | |
| The Viscount Peel | 8 January 1919 | Civil | Chairman of Panel, Military Service (Government Departments) Committee; Chairman of Disabled Sailors' and Soldiers' 'Compensation Committee; formerly Chairman of the Committee on Detention of Neutral Vessels and of the Black List Committee. "For services in connection with the war". | | |
| The Lord Raglan | 8 January 1919 | Civil | Late Lieutenant-Governor of the Isle of Man. "For services in connection with the war". | | |
| Sir Edward Willis Duncan Ward, Bt. | 8 January 1919 | Civil | Director-General of Voluntary Organisations; Commanding and Chief Staff Officer of the Metropolitan Special Constabulary. "For services in connection with the war". | | |
| Honorary Lieutenant-Colonel His Highness The Maharaja of Nawanagar | 3 June 1919 | Military | "In recognition of valuable services rendered in India in connection with the War". | | |
| Major-General Sir Frederick Hugh Sykes | 26 August 1919 | Military | "For distinguished services to Aviation in general, and in particular for invaluable work as former Chief of the Air Staff". | | |
| General Sir Baber Shumshere Jang Bahadoor Rana of Nepal | 19 December 1919 | | | | |
| Sir Alexander Baird, Bt. | 1 January 1920 | Civil | President, Permanent Arbitration Board, Egypt. "For services in connection with the War." | | |
| The Viscount Chilston | 1 January 1920 | Civil | Chief County Director, British Red Cross Society and Order of St. John. "For services in connection with the War." | | |
| Brigadier-General Sir Alexander Gibb | 1 January 1920 | Civil | Late Civil Engineer-in-Chief, Admiralty. "For services in connection with the War." | | |
| Colonel Sir James Gildea | 1 January 1920 | Civil | Founder and Chairman of the Sailors' and Soldiers' Families' Association. "For services in connection with the War." | | |
| Sir Charles Harris | 1 January 1920 | Civil | Assistant Financial Secretary, War Office. "For services in connection with the War." | | |
| Sir Nathaniel Joseph Highmore | 1 January 1920 | Civil | Assistant Director, War Trade Department. "For services in connection with the War." | | |
| Sir Robert Stevenson Horne | 1 January 1920 | Civil | Minister of Labour. "For services in connection with the War." | | |
| Sir Robert Molesworth Kindersley | 1 January 1920 | Civil | Chairman, National War Savings Committee. "For services in connection with the War." | | |
| Sir Harry Livesey | 1 January 1920 | Civil | Late Director of Navy Contracts and subsequently Commissioner for Contract Policy, and Admiralty Representative on Lord Colwyn's Inter-departmental Committee. "For services in connection with the War." | | |
| The Earl of Meath | 1 January 1920 | Civil | "For services in connection with the War." | | |
| Sir Thomas Munro | 1 January 1920 | Civil | Chairman of Provisional Joint Committee of Industrial Conference; Chief Adviser, Labour Regulation Department, Ministry of Munitions. "For services in connection with the War." | | |
| Sir John Denison-Pender | 1 January 1920 | Civil | Managing Director of Eastern Telegraph Company. "For services in connection with the War." | | |
| Edward Aurelian Ridsdale | 1 January 1920 | Civil | Vice-Chairman of Executive Committee, British Red Cross Society. "For services in connection with the War." | | |
| Arthur Everett Shipley | 1 January 1920 | Civil | Vice-Chancellor of Cambridge University. "For services in connection with the War." | | |
| Sir Henry Babington Smith | 1 January 1920 | Civil | Acted as Deputy to the Earl of Reading in the United States of America. "For services in connection with the War." | | |
| Commanding General Sir Padma Shumshere Jung Bahadur Rana of Nepal | 24 March 1920 | | | | |
| Sir Percy Elly Bates, Bt. | 5 June 1920 | Civil | Voluntary services to the Ministry of Shipping for five years. "On the occasion of His Majesty's Birthday". | | |
| Sir John Lorne MacLeod | 5 June 1920 | Civil | Lord Provost of Edinburgh throughout the War. "On the occasion of His Majesty's Birthday". | | |
| Lieutenant-Colonel Sir Thomas Bilbe Robinson | 5 June 1920 | Civil | Agent-General for Queensland until end of 1919. Services to Board of Trade in connection with purchase and distribution of frozen meat for Allied Forces. "On the occasion of His Majesty's Birthday". | | |
| Herbert Louis Samuel | 11 June 1920 | Civil | His Majesty's High Commissioner for Palestine. | | |
| Sir Edward Owen Cox | 15 October 1920 | Civil | "For services in or for certain of the Overseas Dominions, and in connection with the War". | | |
| Frederic Courtland Penfield | October 1920 | | | Presented in Washington D.C. | |
| Henry Morgenthau | November 1920 | | | Presented by Sir Auckland Geddes, British Ambassador to the United States. "In recognition of his services to British civilian and military prisoners during the war." | |
| Lieutenant-General Sir Richard Cyril Byrne Haking | 1 January 1921 | Military | | | |
| Honorary Major-General His Highness The Maharaja of Bikaner | 1 January 1921 | Military | "For valuable services rendered during the War". | | |
| Colonel (Temporary Major-General) The Earl of Scarbrough | 12 February 1921 | Military | Director-General of the Territorial Force. | "Lord Scarbrough relinquished on Saturday [12 February 1921] his appointment as Director-General of the Territorial Force, after holding that office for the usual period of four years." | |
| Count Sutemi Chinda | May 1921 | | | On the occasion of the visit of the Crown Prince of Japan to the United Kingdom. | |
| Evelyn Cecil | 2 January 1922 | Civil | Secretary-General of the Order of St. John of Jerusalem in England, 1915–21. Vice-Chairman Joint War Committee of the British Red Cross Society and Order of St. John of Jerusalem. | | |
| Charles Scott Sherrington | 2 January 1922 | Civil | President of the Royal Society. | | |
| Sir Laming Worthington-Evans, Bt. | 3 June 1922 | Civil | "On the occasion of His Majesty' Birthday". | | |
| John Herbert Lewis | 19 October 1922 | Civil | Under Secretary to the Board of Education since 1916. | | |
| Sir Philip Albert Gustave David Sassoon, Bt. | 19 October 1922 | Civil | Parliamentary Private Secretary to the Right Honourable David Lloyd George. | | |
| The Right Honourable The Viscount St Davids | 19 October 1922 | Civil | | | |
| Admiral Sir Reginald Godfrey Otway Tupper | 28 December 1922 | Military | | | |
| Lieutenant-General Sir Charles Harington Harington | 28 December 1922 | Military | | | |
| Sir John Malcolm Fraser, Bt. | 30 December 1922 | Civil | | | |
| Sir Harry Harling Lamb | 2 June 1923 | Civil | Until recently His Majesty's Consul-General at Smyrna. "On the occasion of His Majesty's Birthday". | | |
| Major-General Sir Lee Oliver Fitzmaurice Stack | 2 June 1923 | Civil | Governor-General of the Sudan. "On the occasion of His Majesty's Birthday". | | |
| Sir William Guy Granet | 2 June 1923 | Civil | For public services. "On the occasion of His Majesty's Birthday". | | |
| Sir Francis Drummond Percy Chaplin | 2 June 1923 | Civil | Lately Administrator of Southern Rhodesia and of Northern Rhodesia. | | |
| Admiral Sir Alexander Ludovic Duff | 3 June 1924 | Military | "On the occasion of His Majesty's Birthday". | | |
| Robert Donald | 3 June 1924 | Civil | For public services. Chairman of the Council of the Empire Press Union. "On the occasion of His Majesty's Birthday". | | |
| Sir Howard George Frank, Bt. | 3 June 1924 | Civil | Lately Chairman of the Disposal and Liquidation Commission. For public services. "On the occasion of His Majesty's Birthday". | | |
| Sir Josiah Charles Stamp | 3 June 1924 | Civil | For public services. "On the occasion of His Majesty's Birthday". | | |
| Sir Mansfeldt de Cardonnel Findlay | 3 June 1924 | Civil | Lately His Majesty's Minister at Christiania. "On the occasion of His Majesty's Birthday". | | |
| Field Marshal The Lord Plumer | 3 June 1924 | Civil | Governor and Commander-in-Chief of the Island of Malta. "On the occasion of His Majesty's Birthday". | | |
| Major-General The Lord Cheylesmore | 3 June 1925 | Civil | Chairman of the National Rifle Association; President of the Lord Roberts' Memorial Workshops. Twice Mayor of Westminster and Chairman of London County Council 1912–13. "On the occasion of His Majesty's Birthday". | | |
| Sir Frederic George Kenyon | 3 June 1925 | Civil | Director and Principal Librarian of the British Museum. "On the occasion of His Majesty's Birthday". | | |
| Sir John Francis Cleverton Snell | 3 June 1925 | Civil | Chairman of the Electricity Commission. "On the occasion of His Majesty's Birthday". | | |
| Sir Hugh Charles Clifford | 3 June 1925 | Civil | Governor and Commander-in-Chief of the Colony and Protectorate of Nigeria, Governor and Commander-in-Chief designate of the Island of Ceylon. "On the occasion of His Majesty's Birthday". | | |
| Ignacy Jan Paderewski | 25 June 1925 | | | Conferred by King George V at an audience at Buckingham Palace. "It is understood that the honour is in acknowledgement of M. Paderewski's services to the British Legion in giving recitals on behalf of Lord Haig's Fund." | |
| Lieutenant-General Sir George Mark Watson Macdonogh | 17 July 1925 | Military | | | |
| Lieutenant-General Sir Travers Edwards Clarke | 19 January 1926 | Civil | "In connection with the termination of the British Empire Exhibition". | | |
| Admiral Sir Frederic Edward Errington Brock (Note: The London Gazette gives his first name as Frederick.) | 5 June 1926 | Military | "On the occasion of His Majesty's birthday." | | |
| The Lord Islington | 5 June 1926 | Civil | Retiring Chairman of the National Savings Committee. "On the occasion of His Majesty's birthday." | | |
| Sir William Warrender Mackenzie | 5 June 1926 | Civil | Late President of the Industrial Court. "On the occasion of His Majesty's birthday." | | |
| The Lord Queenborough | 5 June 1926 | Civil | "For public services". "On the occasion of His Majesty's birthday." | | |
| Sir Henry Frank Heath | 3 June 1927 | Civil | Late Secretary to the Department of Scientific and Industrial Research. "On the occasion of His Majesty's birthday". | | |
| Lieutenant-Colonel the Right Honourable Sir Samuel John Gurney Hoare, Bt. | 3 June 1927 | Civil | "On the occasion of His Majesty's birthday". | | |
| Sir Otto Ernst Niemeyer | 3 June 1927 | Civil | Controller of Finance, H.M. Treasury. "On the occasion of His Majesty's birthday". | | |
| Sir Richard Threfall | 3 June 1927 | Civil | "For public services." "On the occasion of His Majesty's birthday". | | |
| The Right Honourable Edward Hilton Young | 3 June 1927 | Civil | Chairman of the Royal Commission on Indian Currency. "On the occasion of His Majesty's birthday". | | |
| Sir Henry Strakosch | 3 June 1927 | Civil | Lately Member of the Royal Commission on Indian Currency. "On the occasion of His Majesty's birthday". | | |
| General The Earl of Cavan | 27 June 1927 | Civil | "On the occasion of the Visit of T.R.H. The Duke and Duchess of York to New Zealand and Australia to inaugurate the new capital of the Commonwealth of Australia at Canberra". | | |
| Sir George Rowland Blades, Bt. | 27 September 1927 | Civil | | On his retirement as Lord Mayor of London. The customary baronetcy could not be conferred as Blades was already a baronet. | |
| Colonel His Royal Highness The Maharaja of Kapurthala | 29 November 1927 | Civil | | Announced by The Lord Irwin, Governor-General of India, on 26 November 1927 in Kapurthala, on the occasion of his visit for the Maharaja's Golden Jubilee. | |
| General Sir James Frederick Noel Birch | 9 December 1927 | Military | Colonel Commandant, Royal Artillery. | | |
| Dr Luis Alberto de Herrera | February 1928 | | | Special Ambassador, Uruguayan Special Mission. | |
| Sir John Dewrance | 4 June 1928 | | For public and political services. "On the occasion of His Majesty's Birthday". | | |
| Brigadier-General Sir Henry Percy Maybury | 4 June 1928 | | Director General of Roads, Ministry of Transport. "On the occasion of His Majesty's Birthday". | | |
| Sir John Hubert Oakley | 4 June 1928 | | Member of the Irish Grants Committee. "On the occasion of His Majesty's Birthday". | | |
| Sir William Grenfell Max Muller | 4 June 1928 | | Lately His Majesty's Envoy Extraordinary and Ministry Plenipotentiary at Warsaw. "On the occasion of His Majesty's Birthday". | | |
| The Right Honourable The Lord Phillimore | 7 August 1928 | Civil | "In recognition of services as President of the Naval Prize Tribunal Since its inception in 1918, and on the occasion of the dissolution of the Tribunal." | | |
| Brigadier-General Sir William Thomas Francis Horwood | 2 November 1928 | Civil | | | |
| Air Vice-Marshal Sir Philip Woolcott Game | 1 January 1929 | Military | | | |
| Sir Arthur Henry Crosfield, Bt. | 1 March 1929 | Civil | Chairman of the National Playing Fields Association. | | |
| Sir William McLintock | 1 March 1929 | Civil | Senior partner in Messrs. Thomson McLintock & Co., Chartered Accountants. For public services. | | |
| Sir William Symington McCormick | 1 March 1929 | Civil | Chairman of the University Grants Committee and of the Advisory Council of the Department of Scientific and Industrial Research. | | |
| Sir Henry Robert Conway Dobbs | 1 March 1929 | Civil | High Commissioner and Commander-in-Chief, Iraq. | | |
| Sir Arthur McDougall Duckham | 3 June 1929 | Civil | Chairman, Economic Mission to Australia. "On the occasion of His Majesty's Birthday". | | |
| The Honourable Sir William Francis Kyffin Taylor | 3 June 1929 | Civil | Lately Vice-President of the War Compensation Court. "On the occasion of His Majesty's Birthday". | | |
| The Right Honourable Sir Beilby Francis Alston | 3 June 1929 | Civil | His Majesty's Ambassador at Rio de Janeiro. "On the occasion of His Majesty's Birthday". | | |
| Sir Harold Bowden, Bt. | 28 June 1929 | Civil | "For philanthropic and public services." | | |
| The Right Honourable Sir Philip Cunliffe-Lister | 28 June 1929 | Civil | Member of Parliament for Hendon Division since 1918. Lately President of the Board of Trade. | | |
| Commander The Right Honourable Bolton Meredith Eyres-Monsell | 28 June 1929 | Civil | Member of Parliament for Evesham Division since 1910. Conservative Chief Whip since 1923. | | |

== 1920s ==
=== 1919 ===
- Anastasios Adossides (August 1919?)

=== 1920 ===
- Division and date unknown
  - Abdullah (honorary)
  - Prince Zeid bin Hussein (honorary)
  - Ali of Hejaz (honorary)

=== 1922 ===
- Civil Division
  - José Evaristo Uriburu y Tezanos Pinto (date unknown)

=== 1927 ===
- Hereditary Prince of Korea (30 September 1927)
- HH Commanding-General Sir Kaiser Shamsher Jang Bahadur Rana

== 1930s ==
=== 1930 ===
- Military Division
  - Admiral Sir Edward Bradford (1 January)
- Civil Division
  - Antonio Chiaramonte Bordonaro (honorary) (25 March) (invested by Arthur Henderson)
  - Balbino Giuliano
- Division and date unknown
  - Ras Kassa Darge (honorary)

=== 1931 ===
- Gabriel Terra (1931) (on the occasion of the Prince of Wales' visit)

=== 1932 ===
- Civil Division
  - Sir Robert Gibson (3 June)
- Division and date unknown
  - The Crown Prince of Ethiopia (honorary)
  - Prince Faisal of Saudi Arabia (honorary)

=== 1934 ===
- Military Division
  - Admiral Sir Howard Kelly (1 January)
- Civil Division
  - Sir Alan Anderson (4 June)
  - Sir John Reith (4 June)
  - Colonel Malik Sir Umar Hayat Khan (4 June)
- Division and date unknown
  - Bahadur Shamsher Jang Bahadur Rana (honorary)

=== 1935 ===
- Military Division
  - General Sir Felix Ready (3 June)
- Civil Division
  - Sir George Newman (3 June)
  - Edward Beatty (3 June)
  - Sir Ibrahim Rahimtoola (3 June)
  - The Sultan of Johore (honorary) (3 June)
  - The Sultan of Zanzibar (honorary) (3 June)
  - Sir Stephen Killik (27 September)

=== 1936 ===
- Civil Division
  - Sir Sidney Barton (1 January)

=== 1937 ===
- Archibald Rice Cameron
- Frederic Dreyer
- Sir Ernest Strohmenger
- Kaiser Shumsher Jang Bahadur Rana (honorary)
- Baron Emile-Ernest de Cartier de Marchienne (honorary)
- Maharaja, HH Mohan Shamsher Jang Bahadur Rana of Nepal (honorary)

=== 1938 ===
- Sir Andrew Duncan
- Carl Gustaf Emil Mannerheim (honorary [29 September]; removed 194?)
- The Earl of Onslow
- Leger, (Marie-René) Alexis Saint-Leger (honorary)

=== 1939 ===
- Frank Edward Smith

== 1940s ==
- ch1941: Frederick Bowhill; Reginald Dorman-Smith; Thomas Gardiner; The Viscount Nuffield; Arthur Robinson; The Lord Rushcliffe; 1st Baron Wilson
- 1942: Charles Little; 1st Baron Riverdale
- 1943: Prince of Berar; Thomas Blamey; Henry Hallett Dale; Edgar Ludlow-Hewitt; Percy Noble; William Platt; William Charles Wright
- 1944: Cowasji Jehangir, 2nd Baronet; Allan Powell; 1st Baron Salter
- 1945: Vijayaraji Khengarji Sawai Bahadur; Christopher Courtney; The Viscount Finlay; Ernest Gowers; Sir James Lithgow, Bt.; Maharana Shri Vijayasinhji Chhatrasinhji, Maharaja of Rajpipla; Alexandros Papagos (honorary; presented 3 August), Vasily Sokolovsky (honorary); Harold R. Stark (honorary); General Walter Bedell Smith (honorary); General Carl Spaatz (honorary)
- 1946: 1st Baron Alness; Edward Appleton; Thomas Barlow; Muhammad Ahmad Said Khan Chhatari; Douglas Evill; Henry French; Alexander Hood; Maurice Holmes; Harold Howitt; Hubert Huddleston; 1st Baron Iliffe; John Kennedy; Arthur Power; Charles Kennedy-Purvis; Henry Peat; Thomas Williams Phillips; Hubert Rance; Bernard Rawlings; James Somerville; 1st Viscount Slim; Sir Francis Vernon Thomson, Bt.; Maharaja of Tripura; Clark Haynes Minor (honorary)
- 1947: John Chancellor; William Currie; Geoffrey Layton; George Sansom; Sir Victor Sassoon. Bt.; Winthrop W. Aldrich (honorary); Jean Monnet (honorary)
- 1948: Sir Philip Christison, Bt.; Guy Garrod; Edward Mellanby; Sir Cyril Radcliffe; Reginald Leeper; John Waddington
- 1949: Robert Howe; Wilson Jameson; Walter Moberly; Sir Brian Robertson, Bt.; General Shanker Shamsher Jung Bahadur Rana (honorary)

== 1950s ==
- 1950: Robert Burnett; Ralph Cochrane; 6th Earl of Ilchester; Donald Gainer; 1st Baron Silsoe; Sir Kenneth Dugald Stewart, Bt.
- 1951: Patrick Brind; 28th Earl of Crawford; Lord Porter; Neil Ritchie; Dirk Stikker (honorary)
- 1952: Leslie Hollinghurst; Henry Mack
- 1953: Siddiq Abubakar III (honorary); Hilary Blood; 1st Baron Brabazon of Tara; The Duke of Edinburgh; Alvary Gascoigne; Cecil Harcourt; Alexander Knox Helm; 1st Baron Llewellin; Hugh Pughe Lloyd; 5th Earl of Limerick; Guy Russell; Frank Simpson; Charles Woolley; John William Davis (honorary)
- 1954: 3rd Baron Aberdare; Idris I of Libya; John Wakeling Baker; Sir Noël Bowater, Bt.; Gilbert Rennie; John Whitworth-Jones; Idris of Libya (honorary)
- 1955: 3rd Viscount Esher; Geoffrey Oliver; 1st Baron Rootes; John Troutbeck
- 1956: 9th Earl De La Warr; Miles Dempsey; 1st Baron Erskine of Rerrick; John Morison; Christopher Warner; John Whiteley; Juscelino Kubitschek (honorary); Leif Axel Lorentz Belfrage (honorary)
- 1957: Nevil Brownjohn; 16th Earl of Dalhousie; Francis Evans; Francis Fogarty; Archibald Forbes; 1st Baron Hailes; Charles Keightley; Charles Pizey; Geoffrey Thompson; Lewis Williams Douglas (honorary); Nils Thomas Svenningsen (honorary)
- 1958: 1st Baron Citrine; Donald Hardman; Claude Pelly; Denis Truscott; Sir Harold Yarrow, Bt.
- 1959: John Balfour; 1st Viscount Kemsley; William Palmer; Frederick Parham; Joseph Bech (honorary)

== 1960s ==
- 1960: 4th Baron Cottesloe; Gerald Gladstone; Ian Jacob; Sir Ivo Mallet; Cecil Sugden
- 1961: 5th Earl of Bandon; James Bowker; Ellis Hunter; William Luce; Ivan Stedeford
- 1962: Kenneth Blackburne; Hector Hetherington; Oscar Morland; Ricardo Rivera Schreiber (honorary)
- 1963: Colville Deverell; Walter Merton; Harold Pyman; 10th Earl of Selkirk; Geoffrey Wallinger; Wilfrid Woods
- 1964: Arthur fforde; James Harman; George Labouchere; Roderick McLeod
- 1965: Walter Cheshire; Alexander Gordon; James Miller; William Oliver
- 1966: Robert Bray; Lionel Denny; Alfred Earle; John Graham Hamilton; Hugh Stephenson; André Charles Corbin (honorary)
- 1967: John Anderson; Robert Bellinger; Alexander Bustamante; Leslie O'Brien
- 1968: The Duke of Norfolk; Nigel Henderson; Gilbert Inglefield
- 1969: Kenneth Darling; Charles Gairdner; Sir Louis Gluckstein; Arthur Kirby; David Lee; Charles Trinder

== 1970s ==
- 1970: Ian Bowater; The Lord Thomson of Fleet
- 1972: Sir Edward Howard; René Jean Pleven (honorary)
- 1973: The Lord Martonmere; The Lord Cole
- 1974: Murray Fox; Jack Marshall; The Lord Shawcross
- 1975: Lindsay Ring; 3rd Baron Rothschild
- 1976: Hugh Bullock (honorary; first US citizen to receive this honour); Robin Gillett; Sir Murray MacLehose; Richard Ward; Alan Smith
- 1977: Robert Mark; Peter White; Peter Vanneck
- 1978: Peter Le Cheminant; Kenneth Cork; Ronald Davison
- 1979: Peter Gadsden; Yuet-keung Kan; The Earl St Aldwyn

== 1980s ==
- 1980: Hugh Beach; Ronald Gardner-Thorpe
- 1981: Robert Freer; Christopher Leaver
- 1982: Anthony Farrar-Hockley; John Fieldhouse; Anthony Jolliffe; Anthony Morton; Francis Vallat
- 1983: Admiral Sir William Thomas Pillar;
- 1984: John Gingell; Alan Traill
- 1985: Allan Davis; Frank Kitson
- 1986: David Rowe-Ham
- 1987: Faisal al-Hegelan (honorary); Joshua Hassan; Kenneth Newman; The Lord Plowden; Greville Spratt
- 1988: Kenneth Berrill; Christopher Collett; Taher al-Masri (honorary); Caspar Weinberger (honorary)
- 1989: Hugh Bidwell; Sze-yuen Chung; Thomas Eichelbaum; David Harcourt-Smith; Sir John Woodward

== 1990s ==
- 1990: Alexander Graham; Sir Richard Vincent; Sir Tasker Watkins
- 1991: Jeremy Black; Sir Patrick Hine; Brian Jenkins; Edward Bernard Raczyński (19? December 1991)
- 1992: Francis McWilliams; Anthony Skingsley
- 1994: Sir Kenneth Eaton
- 1995: Ion Caramitru
- 1997: The Lord Keith of Kinkel; Sir John Willis
- 1998: The Lord Rothschild; Sir William Wratten
- 1999: Sir Peter Abbott; Sir Stephen Brown; George J. Mitchell (honorary)

== 2000s ==
- 2000: The Lord George
- 2002: Sir Anthony Bagnall; Sir Michael Perry; Sir Ronald Waterhouse; Sir Ronnie Flanagan
- 2004: Sir Cyril Julian Hebden Taylor
- 2007: Sir David Cooksey; Sir Timothy Granville-Chapman

== 2010s ==
- 2011: The Lord King of Lothbury; The Earl of Selborne; The Lord Weidenfeld
- 2012: Sir John Parker
- 2013: Sir Alan Budd; Sir Keith Mills

=== 2014 ===
- Civil Division
  - Sir John Bell (31 December)
  - Ratan Tata (honorary) (date unknown)

=== 2015 ===
- Military Division
  - Air Chief Marshal Sir Stuart Peach (31 December)

=== 2016 ===
- Civil Division
  - Sir Ian Wood (11 June)
  - Sir Cyril Chantler (31 December)

=== 2017 ===
- Civil Division
  - Sir Michael Rawlins (17 June)
  - Sir David Weatherall (17 June)
  - Sir Keith Peters (30 December)

=== 2018 ===
- Civil Division
  - Sir Craig Reedie (9 June)
  - Sir Christopher Greenwood (9 June)

=== 2019 ===
- Civil Division
  - Sir Michael Burton

== 2020s ==
=== 2021 ===
- Civil Division
  - The Earl Howe (12 June)

=== 2022 ===
- Civil Division
  - Sir Partha Dasgupta (31 December)

=== 2023 ===
- Civil Division
  - Sir Bill Beaumont (30 December)
  - Sir James McDonald (30 December)
  - Sir Ridley Scott (30 December)

=== 2024 ===
- Civil Division
  - The Lord Etherton (14 June)
  - Sir Leszek Borysiewicz (30 December)

=== 2025 ===
- Civil Division
  - Sir Simon Wessely (15 June)
- Military Division
  - Sir Tony Radakin (27 December)

=== 2026 ===
- Civil Division
  - Sir Jon Cunliffe (13 June)

== Unknown ==
- Raul Regis de Oliveira (1874–1942)
- Don Agustin Edwards (1927 or before)
- Saud of Saudi Arabia
- Agustín Pedro Justo Rolón
- Juan Carlos Blanco (1926)
- Jorge Matte Gormaz
- General Carlos Ibáñez del Campo
- Luis Miguel Sánchez Cerro
- Paul Ely

== See also ==
- List of dames grand cross of the Order of the British Empire
- List of knights and ladies of the Garter
- List of knights and ladies of the Thistle
- List of knights and dames grand cross of the Order of the Bath
- List of knights and dames grand cross of the Order of St Michael and St George
