= Charles Walker (engineer) =

British engineer and aerodynamicist (1877–1968)

Charles Clement Walker CBE FRAeS (25 August 1877 – 30 September 1968) was a British engineer and aerodynamicist, who became a founding director and chief engineer at de Havilland. He was "one of the great men of aviation's formative decades".

== Family ==
In 1837 his grandfather Charles Walker (1788-) formed a company and manufacturing works on Little Sutton Street in Clerkenwell, to make valves for gasworks. The company moved to Shropshire in 1857, being owned by his sons William Thomas Walker and Charles Clement Walker, as C. & W. Walker.

Charles Walker took over until his death in 1897, when it became a limited company. His uncle, Charles Clement Walker, (23 November 1822 - 4 February 1897) died in Lilleshall Old Hall in Shropshire, aged 74. By 1939 the site, the Midland Ironworks, was 20 acres, with 800 workers.

In 1867 C. & W. Walker were instructed to build a gasworks at Sandringham House, for the Prince of Wales, later Edward VII. The company made gasholders across the world. By 1970, the London headquarters were at 51 Westminster Palace Gardens. The company made distillation columns, storage tanks, pressure vessels and pipework for the petrochemical industry. But by the early 1970s the country was changing to natural gas. By the late 1980s, C and W Walker Holdings plc was in Malinslee, becoming Walker Greenbank when a merger was formed by Sir Anthony Jolliffe in September 1986. The former engineering division became Walker Engineering. But in January 1988 the Shropshire site was closed, and would become a housing estate by the early 1990s.

== Early life ==
His parents married on 26 July 1873 at St Anne's church in Highgate Rise. Claudia Ann Smith was the second daughter of Robert Smith, of Regent's Park Terrace and Furnival's Inn. His parents lived at 'Lilleshall' on Bishopswood Road. His father, William Thomas Walker, had lived at Holly Terrace, Highgate. His father traded at 8 Finsbury Circus.

He was educated at Highgate School from 1887 to 1892 and went on to University College, London, where he was in 1938 elected a Fellow.

He had two brothers Mathew and William and a sister Claudia, and was the second son. Claudia Agnes Walker married Augustus Clarkson, of Whitwell, Hertfordshire on 16 June 1903 at All Saints, Highgate.

His father William Thomas Walker (1829 - 6 March 1892) died in Sussex, aged 63. He was one of the few survivors of the RMS Douro that sank on 1 April 1882. His mother Claudia (1852 - 20 August 1928) died aged 76 in 1928.

== Career ==
He joined Geoffrey de Havilland in February 1915.

He retired from the board in January 1955.

== Personal life ==
He married Eileen Hood (1892 – 20 May 1970) on 2 September 1916 at St Michael's Church in Highgate, Middlesex. The service was conducted by Rev Philip E Twamley.

Their only son David was killed flying on a training aircraft with the 2FTS of the RAF, on 2 October 1941, aged 21.

He lived at his house Foresters in Middlesex. He died aged 91 at home, on Monday 30 September 1968, at 'Foresters', The Common, in Stanmore. His wife died at the same address on 20 May 1970.

His name is commemorated in Walker Grove, a street in Hatfield, Hertfordshire.

== See also ==
- de Havilland Mosquito – British multi-role combat aircraft of WW2
