= Lady Donaldson =

Lady Donaldson might refer to:

- Frances Donaldson
- Mary Donaldson, Lady Donaldson of Lymington
- Eleanor Donaldson, Lady Donaldson
