= Walker Greenbank =

Walker Greenbank (LON: WGB) is a UK public company designing and manufacturing wallpaper and fabrics, with a history stretching back more than a century.

== History ==
Charles Walker formed a company in 1837, which moved to Shropshire in 1857, the Midland Iron Works. This company became C. and W. Walker. The grandson of the company founder was Charles Walker (engineer) (1877-1968), of de Havilland from 1915, who was largely responsible for the distinctive features of the de Havilland Mosquito.

The company made distillation columns, storage tanks, pressure vessels and pipework for the petrochemical industry.

By the late 1980s, C and W Walker Holdings plc was in Malinslee, becoming Walker Greenbank when a merger was formed by Sir Anthony Jolliffe in September 1986. The engineering division became Walker Engineering. This 20-acre site in Shropshire closed in January 1988, becoming a housing estate by the mid-1990s.

== Operation ==
It trades under several brands including Arthur Sanderson & Sons, Morris & Co., Zoffany and Harlequin

=== Wallpaper ===
Walker Greenbank prints wallpaper through its subsidiary Anstey Wallpaper Company in a substantial plant in Loughborough which produces wallpapers by modern high-speed processes but also by hand and has the broadest range of production machinery in Europe.

=== Fabrics ===
Fabrics are produced in Lancaster.

== Turnover ==
2016 sales were £88m and profits £10.4m.
