= List of dames grand cross of the Order of the British Empire =

Below is a list of dames grand cross of the Order of the British Empire from the Order's creation in 1917 until the present day:

== Pre-1930 ==
Date	Name	Born	Died	Notes	Ref
4 June 1917	Queen Mary	26 May 1867	24 March 1953		
4 June 1917	Annie Allen, Lady Lawley (Baroness Wenlock from 1931)	1863	29 April 1944	Honorary Secretary, Queen Mary's Needlework Guild	
4 June 1917	Louise Margaret Leila Wemyss, Lady Paget	9 October 1881	24 September 1958	Serbian Relief Fund	
4 June 1917	Flora, Lady Reid	10 November 1867	1 September 1950		
4 June 1917	Katharine Furse	23 November 1875	25 November 1952	Commandant-in-Chief, Women's Voluntary Aid Detachment	
4 December 1917	Frances Charlotte, Baroness Chelmsford (Viscountess Chelmsford from 1921)	22 March 1869	24 September 1957	For services in connection with the War	
1 January 1918	Queen Alexandra	1 December 1844	20 November 1925		
1 January 1918	Margaret, Baroness Ampthill	8 October 1874	12 December 1957	President, Bedfordshire Branch and Member of Council, British Red Cross Society; Head of the Voluntary Aid Detachment Department, Devonshire House	
1 January 1918	Edith Isabel Benyon	30 April 1857	28 March 1919	President, Berkshire Branch, British Red Cross Society; Commandant, Englefield House Hospital	
1 January 1918	Aimée Evelyn, Lady Dawson	1864	24 December 1946	Joint Honorary Secretary, Queen Mary's Needlework Guild	
1 January 1918	Violet Hermione, Duchess of Montrose	10 September 1854	21 November 1940	President, Scottish Branch, British Red Cross Society	
1 January 1918	Mary Elizabeth, Viscountess Northcliffe (Lady Hudson from 1923)	22 December 1867	29 July 1963	Member, Joint Committee of British Red Cross Society and Order of St John of Jerusalem; Donor and Administrator, Lady Northcliffe's Hospital for Officers	
1 January 1918	Sultan Jahan, Begum of Bhopal	9 July 1858	12 May 1930	For services rendered by the Native States of India during the War	
1 January 1918	Annette Louise, Countess of Liverpool	23 May 1875	25 May 1948	For services in or for the Oversea Dominions, Colonies and Protectorates, in connection with the War	
3 June 1918	Princess Christian	25 May 1846	9 June 1923	Member of Council, British Red Cross Society; Member, Joint War Committee of British Red Cross Society and Order of St John of Jerusalem	
3 June 1918	Princess Louise, Duchess of Argyll	18 March 1848	3 December 1939	President, Kensington Branch and Member of Council, British Red Cross Society	
3 June 1918	Princess Helena Victoria	3 May 1870	13 March 1948	Lady President, Young Men's Christian Association; President, Women's Auxiliary of the Young Men's Christian Association for France	
3 June 1918	Ethel Hope Becher	1867	10 May 1948	Matron-in-Chief, Queen Alexandra's Imperial Military Nursing Service	
3 June 1918	Mary Ethel, Viscountess Harcourt	26 August 1874	7 January 1961	Honorary Secretary, American Women's War Relief Fund	
3 June 1918	Agnes Weston	26 March 1840	23 October 1918	Founder, Royal Sailors' Rests	
3 June 1918	Charlotte Josephine, Marchioness of Winchester		28 December 1924	President, Hampshire Branch, British Red Cross Society; Member, VAD Advisory Committee and VAD Selection Board	
3 June 1918	Emma Maud McCarthy	22 September 1859	1 April 1949	Matron-in-Chief, Queen Alexandra's Imperial Military Nursing Service	
3 June 1918	Lady Helen Munro Ferguson (Viscountess Novar from 1920)	1863	9 April 1941	For services in or for the Oversea Dominions, Colonies and Protectorates, in connection with the War	
1 January 1919	Sidney Jane Browne	5 January 1850	13 August 1941	Matron-in-Chief, Territorial Nursing Service	
1 January 1919	Princess Beatrice	14 April 1857	26 October 1944	President, Isle of Wight Branch, British Red Cross Society	
1 January 1919	Princess Marie Louise	12 August 1872	8 December 1956	Head of Bermondsey Voluntary Hospital	
1 January 1919	Adeline Marie, Duchess of Bedford	24 September 1852	12 April 1920	Member, Joint War Committee of British Red Cross Society and Order of St John of Jerusalem; President, Ladies' Committee of Order of St John	
1 January 1919	Mildred, Viscountess Buxton (Countess Buxton from 1920)	29 June 1866	7 December 1955		
1 January 1919	Sarah Ann Swift	22 November 1854	27 June 1937	Matron-in-Chief, British Red Cross Society and Order of St John of Jerusalem	
1 January 1919	Beatrix Frances, Marchioness of Waterford (Duchess of St Albans from 1934)	25 March 1877	5 August 1953	Head of Irish War Hospitals Supply Depots; Member, Joint War Committee for Leinster, Munster and Connaught, British Red Cross Society and Order of St John of Jerusalem	
1 January 1920	Mabell Frances Elizabeth, Dowager Countess of Airlie	10 March 1866	7 April 1956	President, Queen Alexandra's Army Nursing Board	
1 January 1920	Maud Evelyn, Marchioness of Lansdowne	17 December 1850	21 October 1932	For service in connection with the War	
1 January 1920	Alice Edith, Countess of Reading (Marchioness of Reading from 1926)		30 January 1930	For service in connection with the War	
1 January 1920	Annie, Lady de Sausmarez	1856	15 March 1947	President, British Women's Work Association in China	
16 August 1920	Margaret Lloyd George	4 November 1864	20 January 1941		
1 January 1922	Grace Elvina, Marchioness Curzon of Kedleston	16 May 1885	29 June 1958	For services rendered during the War to the British Red Cross Society, the Soldiers' and Sailors' Families Association, the Belgian Soldiers' Club, and Queen Alexandra's Nursing Association	
1 January 1922	Mary Ethel Hughes	6 June 1874	2 April 1958	For services rendered in Australia during the War	
3 June 1924	Marie Adelaide, Baroness Willingdon (Marchioness of Willingdon from 1936)	24 March 1875	30 January 1960		
1 January 1925	Ellen Alice Carew (Ellen Terry)	27 February 1847	21 July 1928		
1 January 1925	Millicent Garrett Fawcett	11 June 1847	5 August 1929		
1 December 1925	Ivy Muriel Chamberlain	10 October 1878	13 February 1941		
1 January 1926	Rachel Cecily, Baroness Forster	1868	12 April 1962	For services in Australia during the period of her husband's Governor Generalship	
5 June 1926	Christina Allen Massey	11 January 1863	19 April 1932	For services to the Dominion of New Zealand	
3 June 1927	Princess Victoria Alexandra Alice Mary, Viscountess Lascelles (Princess Royal from 1932)	25 April 1897	28 March 1965		
3 June 1927	Dame Nellie Melba	19 May 1861	23 February 1931	In recognition of services to the Commonwealth of Australia	
27 June 1927	Elizabeth Angela Marguerite, Duchess of York (Queen Elizabeth from 1936, Queen Mother from 1952)	4 August 1900	30 March 2002	On the occasion of the visit of the Duke and Duchess of York to New Zealand and Australia to inaugurate the new capital of the Commonwealth of Australia at Canberra	
1 March 1929	Edith Sophy Lyttelton	4 April 1865	2 September 1948	For public services	
3 June 1929	Dame Helen Charlotte Isabella Gwynne-Vaughan	21 January 1879	26 August 1967	For public and scientific services	

== 1930s ==
- 1931: The Marchioness of Aberdeen and Temair
- 1932: The Baroness Baden-Powell; The Viscountess Cowdray
- 1937: Princess Alice, Countess of Athlone; The Countess Baldwin of Bewdley; The Duchess of Gloucester; The Duchess of Kent; Enid Lyons
- 1938: The Marchioness of Carisbrooke

== 1940s ==
- 1944: The Dowager Marchioness of Reading
- 1946: The Baroness Spencer-Churchill; The Lady Cripps
- 1948: The Countess Mountbatten of Burma; The Lady Oliver

== 1950s ==
- 1951: The Baroness Denman
- 1953: The Baroness Freyberg
- 1954: The Countess Alexander of Tunis; Pattie Menzies; The Countess of Limerick; The Baroness Horsbrugh
- 1957: Dame Dehra Parker

== 1960s ==
- 1961: The Baroness Sharp
- 1964: Lady Dorothy Macmillan

== 1980s ==
- 1983: The Baroness Donaldson of Lymington

== 2000s ==
- 2005: The Baroness Butler-Sloss

== 2010s ==
- 2012: The Baroness Hayman
- 2019: The Lady Higgins

== 2020s ==
- 2022: Dame Sue Ion
- 2023: Dame Hermione Lee
- 2024: The Baroness Beckett; Dame Carol Black; Queen Camilla (Grand Master); Dame Jenny Abramsky
- 2025: Dame Jacqueline Wilson
- 2026: Dame Parveen Kumar

== See also ==
- List of dames commander of the Order of the British Empire
- List of knights grand cross of the Order of the British Empire
