= Alan Traill =

British politician (1935–2020)

Sir Alan Towers Traill (5 July 1935 – 17 April 2020) was a British politician who served as Lord Mayor of London from 1984 to 1985.

In the 1990 New Zealand Queen's Birthday Honours, Traill was appointed a Companion of the Queen's Service Order for public services. He had a wife, Sarah (née Hutt), and they had a son, Phillip. Traill died on 17 April 2020 at the age of 84.

Civic offices
Preceded by Mary Donaldson, Baroness Donaldson of Lymington	Lord Mayor of London; 1984–1985	Succeeded by Allan Davis
