= Allan Davis (lord mayor) =

Lord Mayor of London (1921–1994)

Sir Allan Davis GBE KStJ DL KCSG FCA FRSA

Lord Mayor of London
- In office 1985–1986

Personal details
- Born: William Allan Davis; 19 June 1921
- Died: 14 August 1994 (aged 73)
- Occupation: Accountant

Sir William Allan Davis (19 June 1921 – 14 August 1994) was a British accountant. He was Lord Mayor of London for 1985 to 1986.
