= Christopher Leaver =

British wine merchant, businessman and politician

Sir Christopher Leaver (born 3 November 1937) is a British wine merchant, businessman, and politician who was the 654th Lord Mayor of London in 1981–1982. He is the son of Dr Robert Leaver and was educated at Eastbourne College.

Leaver served as Alderman for Dowgate City (1974–2002), as Sheriff of the City of London (1979), and as Lord Mayor of London (1981–82). He is also a Justice of the Peace. He was knighted as a Knight Grand Cross of the Order of the British Empire in 1981 and appointed as a Knight of Justice of St John in 1982.

== Other ==
He appeared as a castaway on the BBC Radio programme Desert Island Discs on 13 February 1982.

== Personal life ==
He married Helen Mireille Molyneux Benton in 1975. They have a son and two daughters.

Civic offices
Preceded by Sir Ronald Gardner-Thorpe	Lord Mayor of London; 1981–1982	Succeeded by Sir Anthony Jolliffe
