= Mary Donaldson, Lady Donaldson of Lymington =

British politician (1921–2003)

The Right Honourable The Lady Donaldson of Lymington GBE DStJ JP DL

Lord Mayor of London
- In office 1983–1984

Personal details
- Born: Dorothy Mary Warwick; 29 August 1921 Wickham, Hampshire, England
- Died: 4 October 2003 (aged 82)
- Spouse: John Donaldson (m. 1945) (later Baron Donaldson of Lymington)
- Children: 3

Dorothy Mary Donaldson, Baroness Donaldson of Lymington (née Warwick; 29 August 1921 – 4 October 2003), previously known as Dame Mary Donaldson, was the first female Lord Mayor of London (1983–84).

Born at Wickham, Hampshire, the daughter of an ironmonger and a school teacher, Donaldson trained as a nurse during the war and qualified in 1946.

From 1967 to 1969, she chaired the Women's National Cancer Control Campaign, and then served as the vice president of the British Cancer Council. In 1966, she was elected a member of the City of London Court of Common Council, and became the first female alderman in 1975, the first female Sheriff of the City of London in 1981 and in 1983 the first female Lord Mayor.

"Of course there are things which men can do better than women ... But equally, women have attributes which men can never possess. Personally, I find it difficult not to become over-involved in issues concerning people", Donaldson once commented.

Donaldson chaired the Interim Licensing Authority for Human In Vitro Fertilisation and Embryology (see Human Fertilisation and Embryology Authority) from 1985 and then was a member of the Press Complaints Commission from 1991 to 1996. She remained the only female Lord Mayor of the City of London until the election of Fiona Woolf in 2013.

== Family ==
Donaldson was the wife of John Donaldson, Baron Donaldson of Lymington, who was Master of the Rolls (1982–92); they married in 1945 and had two daughters and a son.

Civic offices
Preceded by Anthony Jolliffe	Lord Mayor of London; 1983–1984	Succeeded by Alan Traill
