= Michael Sydney Perry =

British businessman (born 1934)

Sir Michael Sydney Perry GBE FRSA

Chairman, Centrica
- In office 1997 – 10 May 2004

Personal details
- Born: 24 February 1934 (age 92)

Sir Michael Sydney Perry (born 26 February 1934) is a British businessman who was Chairman of Centrica from 1997 until 10 May 2004. He is currently on the Business Advisory Forum of Oxford Said Business School. Previously, he served as the chairman of Unilever until 1995.

Perry is the son of Lt Cdr Sir Sydney Albert Perry GBE RNVR and Jessie Kate Brooker. He married Joan Mary Stallard and has a son and two daughters.

He was knighted in 1994. He was appointed an Officer of the Order of the British Empire (OBE) in 1978, a Commander of the order (CBE) in 1990 and a Knight Grand Cross of the order (GBE) in 2002.

== Arms ==
Coat of arms of Michael Sydney Perry
Notes Sir Michael Sydney Perry, of Alfrick in Worcestershire, G.B.E., was granted this Coat of Arms by patent of Garter and Clarenceux Kings of Arms dated 1 November 2012. College reference: Grants 176/317. Adopted 1 November 2012 Crest Issuant from a Circlet composed of C-Clefs alternately reversed Or a Pear Tree per pale Sable and Gules fructed and leaved Or. Escutcheon Per pale Sable and Gules a Canton Ermine over all three Pears palewise in bend Or. Supporters On either side a Falcon Argent armed and supporting with the interior leg a Tilting Spear Or headed Argent the dexter statant upon a Globe Gules the sinister upon a Globe Sable each inscribed with eight Longitudinal Great Circles and the Equatorial Tropical and Polar Circles Or. Motto OPERARI CUM CONCORDIA; Latin: "Work with Unity" Orders The circlet and collar of the Order of the British Empire encircle the escutcheon. The badge of a Knight Grand Cross of the same order is suspended from the collar. Badge Three Arrows points upwards one palewise two in saltire enfiling a pair of C-Clefs that on the dexter Sable that on the sinister reversed Gules.
