= Michael Burton (judge) =

British judge (born 1946)

Sir Michael Burton GBE

President of the Investigatory Powers Tribunal
- In office October 2013 – September 2018

President of the Employment Appeal Tribunal
- In office 2002–2005

Vice-President of the Investigatory Powers Tribunal
- In office 2000 – October 2013

Personal details
- Born: Michael John Burton; 12 November 1946 (age 79)

Sir Michael John Burton (born 12 November 1946), styled Mr Justice Burton, is a former judge in the High Court of England and Wales. He was the President of the Investigatory Powers Tribunal between October 2013 and September 2018, having been vice-president since its inception in 2000, the Chair of the Central Arbitration Committee for over 17 years (2000 to 2017) and the former President of the Employment Appeal Tribunal (2002–2005), which was reformed under his presidency. He is an international commercial court judge for the ADGM (Abu Dhabi Global Market) Courts, which apply English Common Law.

== Biography ==
He was educated at Eton College and Balliol College, Oxford.

Prior to his judicial appointment, in 1998, he was head of Littleton Chambers (1991–1998). He was appointed QC in 1984.

Until January 2011 Burton was Chairman of the High Court Judges Association and served as Treasurer of Gray's Inn in 2012.

He was appointed Knight Grand Cross of the Order of the British Empire (GBE) in the 2019 Birthday Honours.

Burton is the figurehead of the Investigatory Powers Tribunal since its inception in 2000 and has played a pivotal role in the UK's world-leading oversight of its security and intelligence agencies. He has ruled on landmark cases that have had a considerable impact on the landscape of investigatory powers. He has adapted the Tribunal to deal with new, wide-ranging counter-terrorism powers and to ensure that it is working within the law.

He is a widower with four daughters and eleven grandchildren. He founded the Corinne Burton Memorial Trust in 1992 in memory of his late wife. The trust has funded art therapy for cancer patients as well as providing support for students wanting to pursue this field. Most notably, he has set up a scholarship fund at Goldsmiths College, London University which is awarded every year to a student who wishes to study art psychotherapy with a focus on cancer care. As Chair of the Trust, he maintains an active role in its funding projects, outreach activities and strategic direction.
