= Westminster Palace Gardens =

Heritage-listed building in London

Coordinates: 51°29′50″N 0°08′08″W

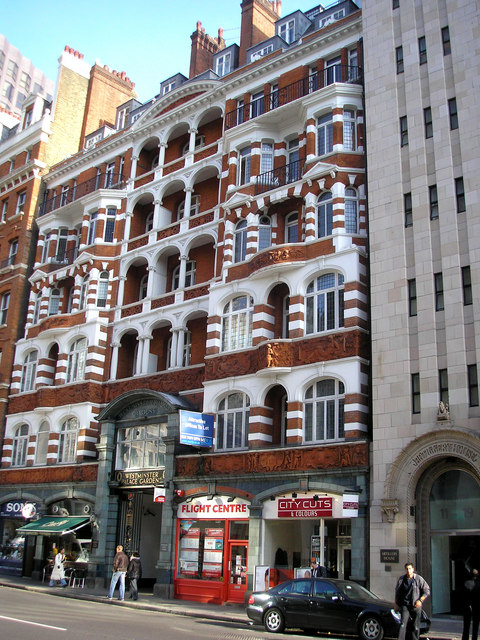
Westminster Palace Gardens in 2008

Westminster Palace Gardens is a Victorian red brick mansion block with apartments centered around a courtyard. It is located on Artillery Row in the City of Westminster. It is listed Grade II on the National Heritage List for England.

The seven-story building was designed in the grand mansion style by architect Charles J.C. Pawley, and was built between 1898 and 1899. The facade of the building is clad at street level in blue and green faience tiles. In the centre of the façade are full-height black iron gates and a two-storey former carriage archway flanked by pilasters. Above the entrance at both first and second floor level are examples of lavish Victorian splendour with ornate terra cotta friezes that run the length of the facade.

Westminster Palace Gardens is located on the site of the former Artillery Brewery. The name "artillery" pays tribute to the site's past use for military drills and target practice.
