= Order of the British Empire =

British order of chivalry established in 1917

Most Excellent Order of the British Empire
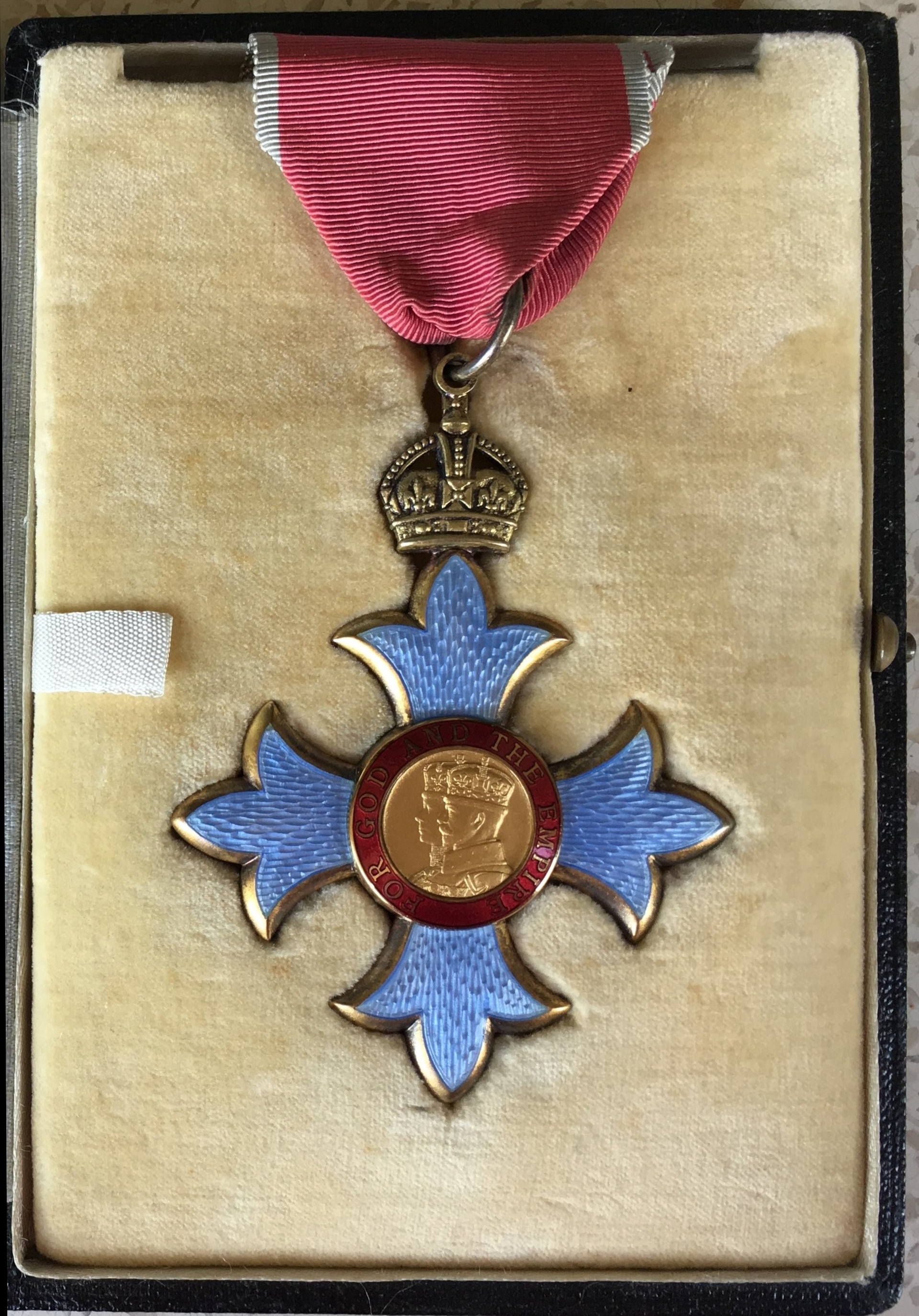
- CBE neck decoration (in civil division)

Awarded by the Monarch of the Commonwealth Realms
- Type: Order of chivalry
- Established: 1917
- Motto: "For God and the Empire"
- Eligibility: British nationals, citizens of the Commonwealth realms, or anyone who has made a significant achievement for the United Kingdom
- Awarded for: Prominent national or regional achievements
- Status: Active
- Founder: George V
- Sovereign: Charles III
- Grand Master: Queen Camilla
- Grades: Knight/Dame Grand Cross (GBE); Knight/Dame Commander (KBE/DBE); Commander (CBE); Officer (OBE); Member (MBE); Recipient of the British Empire Medal (BEM)
- Former grades: Medal of the Order for Gallantry

Precedence
- Next (higher): Royal Victorian Order
- Next (lower): Varies, depending on rank
- Military ribbon Civil ribbon

The Most Excellent Order of the British Empire is a British order of chivalry, rewarding valuable service in a wide range of useful activities. It comprises six classes of appointments across both civil and military divisions, the most senior two of which make the recipient either a knight if male or a dame if female.

The order was established on 4 June 1917 by King George V, who created the order to recognise "such persons, male or female, as may have rendered or shall hereafter render important services to Our Empire". Equal recognition was to be given for services rendered in the UK and overseas. The order was retained after the decline of the British Empire in the second half of the 20th century. The majority of recipients are UK citizens, though a number of Commonwealth realms outside the UK continue to make appointments to the order. Honorary appointments may be made to citizens of other nations of which the order's sovereign is not the head of state.

Appointments are announced in The Gazette.

== Classes ==
The six classes of appointment to the order are, from highest to lowest:

1. Knight Grand Cross or Dame Grand Cross of the Order of the British Empire (GBE); (Note: It is commonly written without "of the Most Excellent Order" and other words not implied by the post-nominals.)
2. Knight Commander or Dame Commander of the Order of the British Empire (KBE or DBE);
3. Commander of the Order of the British Empire (CBE);
4. Officer of the Order of the British Empire (OBE);
5. Member of the Order of the British Empire (MBE);
6. Recipient of the British Empire Medal (BEM).

The two highest ranks, Knight or Dame Grand Cross and Knight or Dame Commander, entitle the holder to use the title Sir or Dame before their forename, except in the case of honorary appointments.

== History ==
King George V founded the order to fill gaps in the British honours system:

- The Orders of the Garter, the Thistle and St Patrick honoured royals, peers, statesmen and eminent military commanders;
- The Order of the Bath honoured senior military officers and civil servants;
- The Order of St Michael and St George honoured diplomats and colonial officials;
- The Order of the Star of India and the Order of the Indian Empire honoured Indian rulers and British and Indian officials of the British Indian Empire; and
- The Royal Victorian Order, in the personal gift of the monarch, honoured those who had personally served the royal family.

In particular, George V wished to create an order to honour the many thousands of individuals from across the Empire who had served in a variety of non-combat roles during the First World War.

From its foundation the order consisted of five classes (GBE, KBE/DBE, CBE, OBE and MBE) and was open to both men and women; provision was also made for conferring honorary appointments on foreign recipients. At the same time, alongside the order, the Medal of the Order of the British Empire was instituted, to serve as a lower appointment granting recipients affiliation but not membership. The first investiture took place at Ibrox Stadium, as part of a royal visit to the Glasgow shipyards, with the appointment of Alexander Ure, 1st Baron Strathclyde as a GBE (in recognition of his role as chairman of the Scottish War Savings Committee) and the conferral of the medal of the order to Lizzie Robinson, a munitions worker.

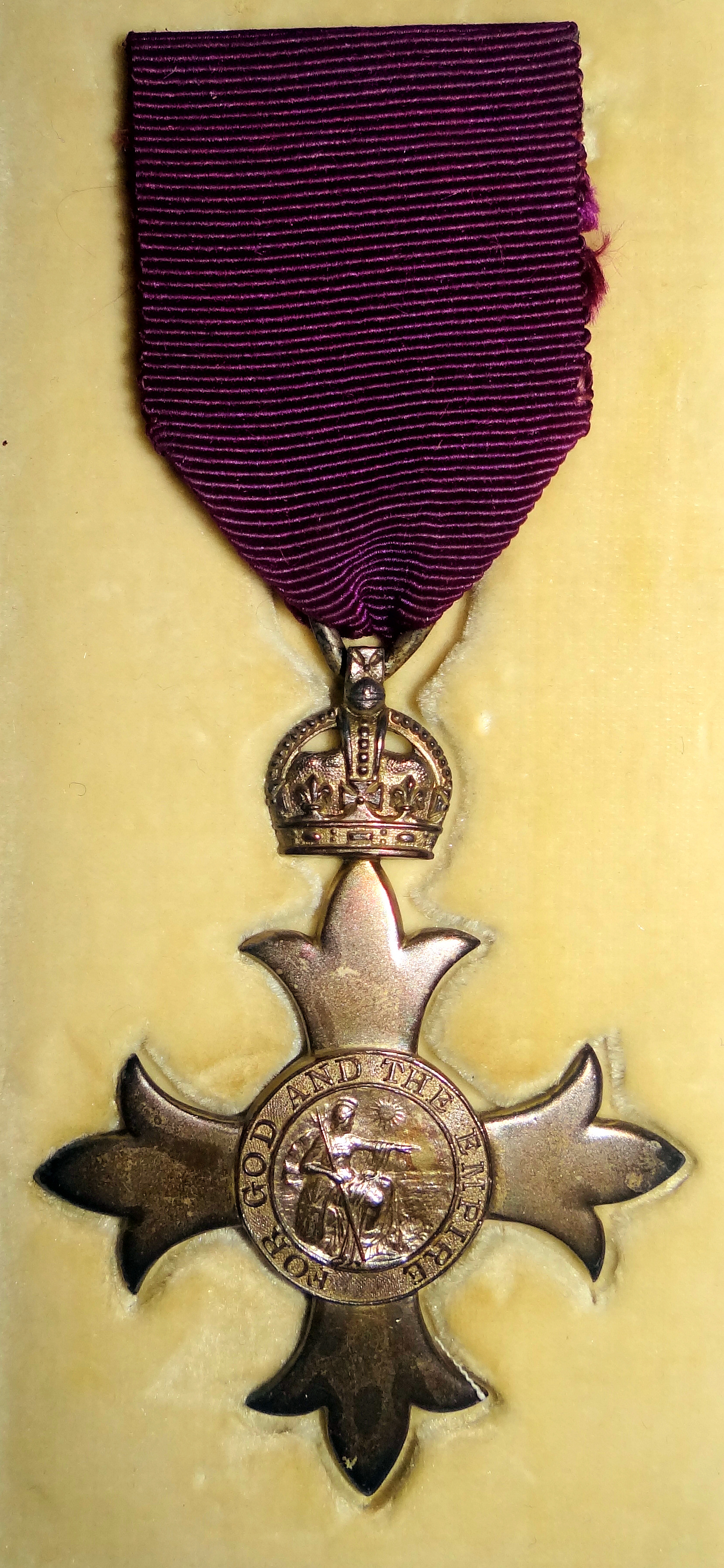
MBE (civil division) as issued in 1918

The order had been established primarily as being for civilians; in August 1918, however, not long after its foundation, a number of appointments were made to serving naval and military personnel. Four months later, a 'Military Division' was added to the order, to which serving personnel would in future be appointed. The classes were the same as for the Civil Division (as it was now termed), but military awards were distinguished by the addition of a central vertical red stripe to the purple riband of the civil awards. In 1920, appointment as an MBE "for an act of gallantry" was granted for the first time, to Sydney Frank Blanck Esq, who had rescued an injured man from a burning building containing explosives.

In December 1922, the statutes of the order were amended; there having been a large number of awards for war work prior to this date, these amended statutes placed the order on more of a peacetime footing. For the first time numbers of appointments were limited, with the stipulation that senior awards in the Civil Division were to outnumber those in the Military Division by a proportion of six to one. Furthermore appointments in the civil division were to be divided equally between UK and overseas awards.

With regard to the Medal of the Order (but not the order itself), a distinction was made in 1922 between awards "for gallantry" and awards "for meritorious service" (each being appropriately inscribed, and the former having laurel leaves decorating the clasp, the latter oak leaves). In 1933, holders of the medal "for gallantry", which had come to be known as the Empire Gallantry Medal, were given permission to use the postnominal letters EGM (and at the same time to add a laurel branch emblem to the ribbon of the medal); however, in 1940, awards of the EGM ceased and all holders of the medal were instructed to exchange it for a new and more prestigious gallantry award: the George Cross. In 1941, the medal of the order "for meritorious service" was renamed the British Empire Medal, and the following year its recipients were granted the right to use the postnominal letters BEM. During the war, the BEM came to be used to recognise acts of bravery which did not merit the conferral of the George Cross or the George Medal, a use which continued until the introduction of the Queen's Gallantry Medal in 1974.

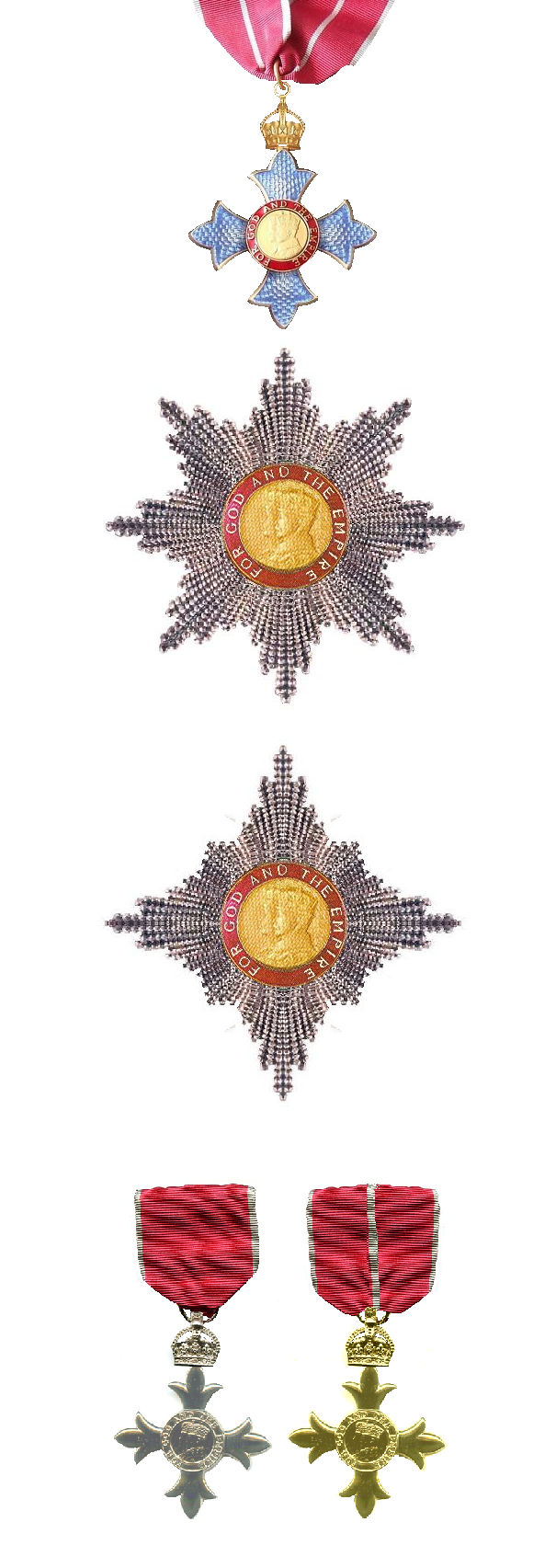
Examples of insignia of the order (1937 pattern). Top to bottom: KBE or CBE (military) badge and riband, GBE star, KBE/DBE star, MBE (civil) and OBE (military) badges and ribands.

The designs of insignia of the order and medal were altered in 1937, prior to the coronation of King George VI, 'in commemoration of the reign of King George V and Queen Mary, during which the Order was founded'. The figure of Britannia at the centre of the badge of the order was replaced with an image of the crowned heads of the late King and Queen Mary, and the words 'Instituted by King George V' were added to the reverse of the medal. The colour of the riband was also changed: twenty years earlier, prior to the order's establishment, Queen Mary had made it known that pink would be her preferred colour for the riband of the proposed new order, but, in the event, purple was chosen. Following her appointment as Grand Master of the order in 1936 a change was duly made and since 9 March 1937 the riband of the order has been 'rose pink edged with pearl grey' (with the addition of a vertical pearl grey stripe in the centre for awards in the military division). (Note: Queen Mary, however, stipulated that the riband of a military Dame Grand Cross should not have a central grey stripe; the last appointment of a Dame Grand Cross in the military division was that of Dame Sidney Browne in 1919.)

From time to time the order was expanded: there was an increase in the maximum permitted number of recipients in 1933, and a further increase in 1937. During the Second World War, as had been the case during and after World War I, the number of military awards was greatly increased; between 1939 and 1946 there were more than 33,000 appointments to the Military Division of the order from the UK and across the Empire. Recommendations for all appointments to the Order of the British Empire were originally made on the nomination of the King's United Kingdom ministers (recommendations for overseas awards were made by the Foreign Office, the Colonial Office, the India Office and the Dominions Office); but in the early 1940s the system was changed to enable the governments of overseas dominions to make their own nominations; Canada and South Africa began doing so in 1942, followed by Australia, New Zealand and other Commonwealth realms.

In May 1957, forty years after the foundation of the order, it was announced that St Paul's Cathedral was to serve as the church of the order, and in 1960 a chapel was dedicated for its use within the crypt of the cathedral. That year, Commonwealth awards made up 40% of all OBEs and MBEs appointed (and 35% of all living recipients of the higher awards). Gradually that proportion reduced as independent states within the Commonwealth established their own systems of honours. The last Canadian recommendation for the Order of the British Empire was an MBE for gallantry gazetted in 1966, a year before the creation of the Order of Canada. On the other hand, the Australian Honours System unilaterally created in 1975 did not achieve bi-partisan support until 1992, which was when Australian federal and state governments agreed to cease Australian recommendations for British honours; the last Australian recommended Order of the British Empire appointments were in the 1989 Queen's Birthday Honours. New Zealand continued to use the order alongside its own honours until the establishment of the New Zealand Order of Merit in 1996. Other Commonwealth realms have continued to use the Order of the British Empire alongside their own honours.

In 1993, the Prime Minister, John Major, instituted a reform of the honours system with the aim 'that exceptional service or achievement will be more widely recognised; that greater importance will be given to voluntary service; that automatic honours will end; that the distinction between ranks in military operational gallantry awards will cease'. The reforms affected the order at various levels: for example the automatic appointment each year of a GBE to the Lord Mayor of London ceased; appointment as OBE replaced the Imperial Service Order for civil servants, and the number of MBEs appointed each year was significantly increased. As part of these reforms, the British Empire Medal stopped being awarded by the United Kingdom; (Note: Use of the BEM continued elsewhere in the Commonwealth; in the UK the BEM (civil) was restored to use 2012.) those who would formerly have met the criteria for the medal were instead made eligible for appointment as MBE.

In 2004, a report entitled A Matter of Honour: Reforming Our Honours System by a Commons select committee recommended phasing out the Order of the British Empire, as its title was "now considered to be unacceptable, being thought to embody values that are no longer shared by many of the country's population". The committee further suggested changing the name of the order to the Order of British Excellence, and changing the rank of Commander to Companion (as the former was said to have a "militaristic ring"), as well as advocating for the abolition of knighthoods and damehoods; the government, however, was not of the opinion that a case for change had been made, and the aforementioned suggestions and recommendations were not, therefore, pursued.

In the 21st century quotas were introduced to ensure consistent representation among recipients across nine categories of eligibility:

- Arts and media
- Community, voluntary and local
- Economy
- Education
- Health
- Parliamentary and political
- Science and technology
- Sport
- State

with the largest proportion of awards being reserved for community, voluntary and local service.

Non-military awards of the British Empire Medal resumed in 2012, starting with 293 BEMs awarded for Queen Elizabeth II's Diamond Jubilee.

In 2017, the centenary of the order was celebrated with a service at St Paul's Cathedral.

== Composition ==
The order is limited to 300 Knights and Dames Grand Cross, 845 Knights and Dames Commander, and 8,960 Commanders. There are no limits applied to the total number of members of the fourth and fifth classes, but no more than 858 officers and 1,464 members may be appointed per year. Foreign appointees, as honorary members, do not contribute to the numbers restricted to the order as full members do. Although the Order of the British Empire has by far the highest number of members of the British orders of chivalry, with more than 100,000 living members worldwide, there are fewer appointments to knighthoods than in other orders. (Note: Whereas DBE is the lowest rank of damehood, KBE is the second-lowest rank of knighthood (above Knights Bachelor). Because of this, women are usually appointed DBE in circumstances when a man would be created a Knight Bachelor (for example, by convention, female judges of the High Court are created Dames Commander on appointment, while male judges become Knights Bachelor).)

From time to time, individuals may be promoted to a higher grade within the Order, thereby ceasing usage of the junior post-nominal letters.

=== Sovereign and Grand Master ===
The British sovereign is the sovereign of the order and appoints all other officers of the order (by convention, on the advice of the governments of the United Kingdom and some Commonwealth realms). The second-most senior officer is the Grand Master (a 'Prince of the Blood Royal, or other exalted personage' appointed by the sovereign, who, by virtue of their appointment, becomes 'the First or Principal Knight Grand Cross of the same Order').

The position of Grand Master has been held by the following people:
No.	Portrait	Grand Master (Born–died)	Term of office	
No.	Portrait	Grand Master (Born–died)	Took office	Left office
1		Edward, Prince of Wales (1894–1972)	4 June 1917	20 January 1936
2		Queen Mary (1867–1953)	27 March 1936	24 March 1953
3		Prince Philip, Duke of Edinburgh (1921–2021)	1 June 1953	9 April 2021
4		Queen Camilla (1947–present)	23 April 2024	Present

=== Officers ===
In addition to the sovereign and the grand master, the order has six officers:

- Prelate: Bishop of London, vacant
- Dean: Dean of St Paul's (ex officio), The Very Rev. Andrew Tremlett
- Secretary: Secretary of the Central Chancery of the Orders of Knighthood, Lieutenant Colonel Stephen Segrave
- Registrar: Secretary of the Cabinet and Head of the Civil Service, Dame Antonia Romeo DCB
- King of Arms: Lieutenant General Sir Simon Mayall KBE CB
- Lady Usher of the Purple Rod: Dame Amelia Fawcett DBE CVO

At its foundation the order was served by three officers: the King of Arms, the Registrar & Secretary and the Gentleman Usher of the Purple Rod. In 1922, the Prelate was added, and the office of Registrar was separated from that of Secretary: the former was to be responsible for recording all proceedings connected with the order, issuing warrants under the seal of the order and making arrangements for investitures, while the latter (at that time the Permanent Secretary to the Treasury) was responsible for collecting and tabulating the names of those who were to receive an award. The office of Dean was added in 1957.

The King of Arms is not a member of the College of Arms, as are many other heraldic officers; and the Lady Usher of the Purple Rod does not – unlike the Order of the Garter equivalent, the Gentleman Usher of the Black Rod – perform any duties related to the House of Lords.

== Commonwealth awards ==
Countries making recommendations to the Order of the British Empire (2020)

Since the Second World War, several Commonwealth realms have established their own national system of honours and awards and have created their own unique orders, decorations and medals.

Following the creation of the Order of Australia in 1975, the Government of the Commonwealth of Australia ceased finally to make recommendations for the Order of the British Empire in 1983, though various Australian state governments continued to make recommendations up to the 1989 New Year Honours.

The Government of New Zealand ceased to make recommendations to the Order of the British Empire with the creation of the New Zealand Order of Merit in 1996.

A number of Commonwealth realms and territories continue to make recommendations for appointments to the Order of the British Empire. In 2025–2026, appointments to the order were made by the governments of:

- Antigua and Barbuda
- The Bahamas
- Belize
- Cook Islands
- Grenada
- Papua New Guinea
- Saint Christopher and Nevis
- Saint Vincent and the Grenadines
- Saint Lucia
- Solomon Islands
- Tuvalu

== Honorary awards ==
Most members of the order are citizens of the United Kingdom or other Commonwealth realms that use the UK system of honours and awards. In addition, honorary awards may be made to citizens of nations where the monarch is not head of state; these permit use of post-nominal letters, but not the title of Sir or Dame. Honorary appointees who later become a citizen of a Commonwealth realm can convert their appointment from honorary to substantive, and they then enjoy all privileges of membership of the order, including use of the title of Sir and Dame for the senior two ranks of the Order.

== Gallantry awards ==
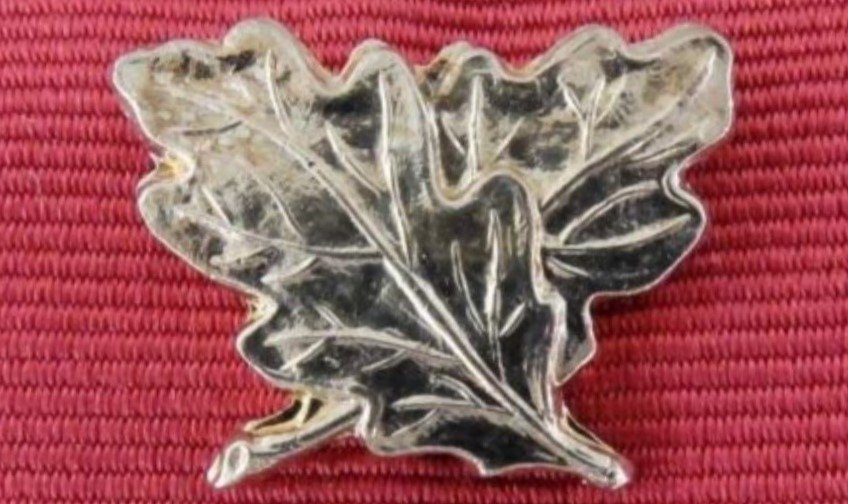
A silver oak-leaf emblem denoted an appointment made "for gallantry" between 1958 and 1974.

Although initially intended to recognise meritorious service, the order began to also be awarded for gallantry. There were an increased number of cases in the Second World War for service personnel and civilians including the merchant navy, police, emergency services and civil defence, mostly MBEs but with a small number of OBEs and CBEs. Such awards were for gallantry that did not reach the standard of the George Medal (even though, as appointments to an order of chivalry, they were listed before it on the Order of Wear). In contrast to awards for meritorious service, which usually appear without a citation, there were often citations for gallantry awards, some detailed and graphic. From 14 January 1958, these awards were designated Commander, Officer or Member of the Order of the British Empire for Gallantry.

Any individual made a member of the order for gallantry after 14 January 1958 wears an emblem of two crossed silver oak leaves on the same ribbon as the badge, with a miniature version on the ribbon bar when worn alone. When the ribbon only is worn the emblem is worn in miniature. It could not be awarded posthumously, and was replaced in 1974 with the Queen's Gallantry Medal (QGM). If recipients of the Order of the British Empire for Gallantry received promotion within the order, whether for gallantry or otherwise, they continued to wear also the insignia of the lower grade with the oak leaves; however, they used only the post-nominal letters of the higher grade.

== Insignia ==
Badges and ribands of the Order of the British Empire (1937–present)

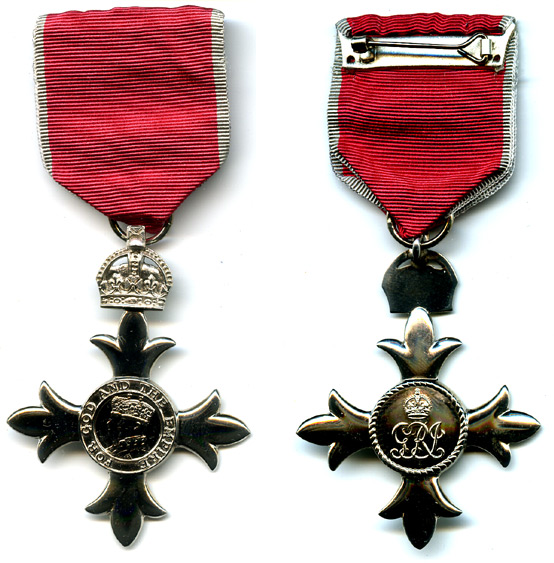
Obverse (left) and reverse of the MBE badge and riband (civil division)

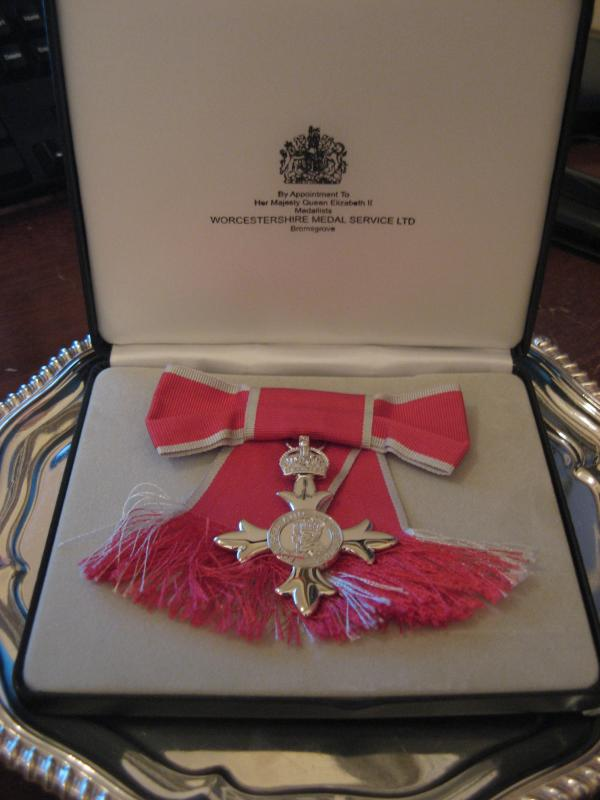
MBE badge as awarded to a female recipient (civil division)

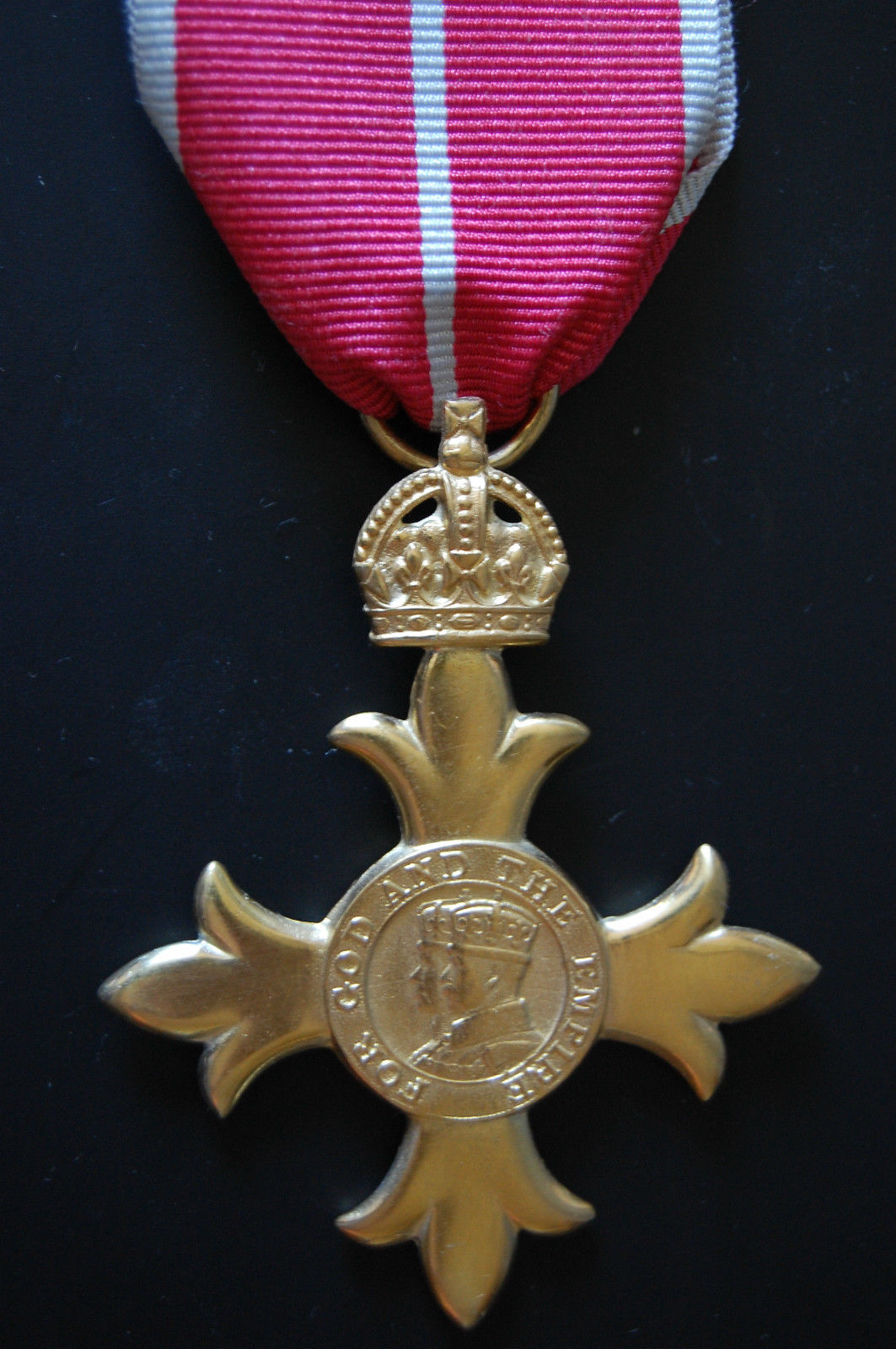
OBE badge and riband (military division)

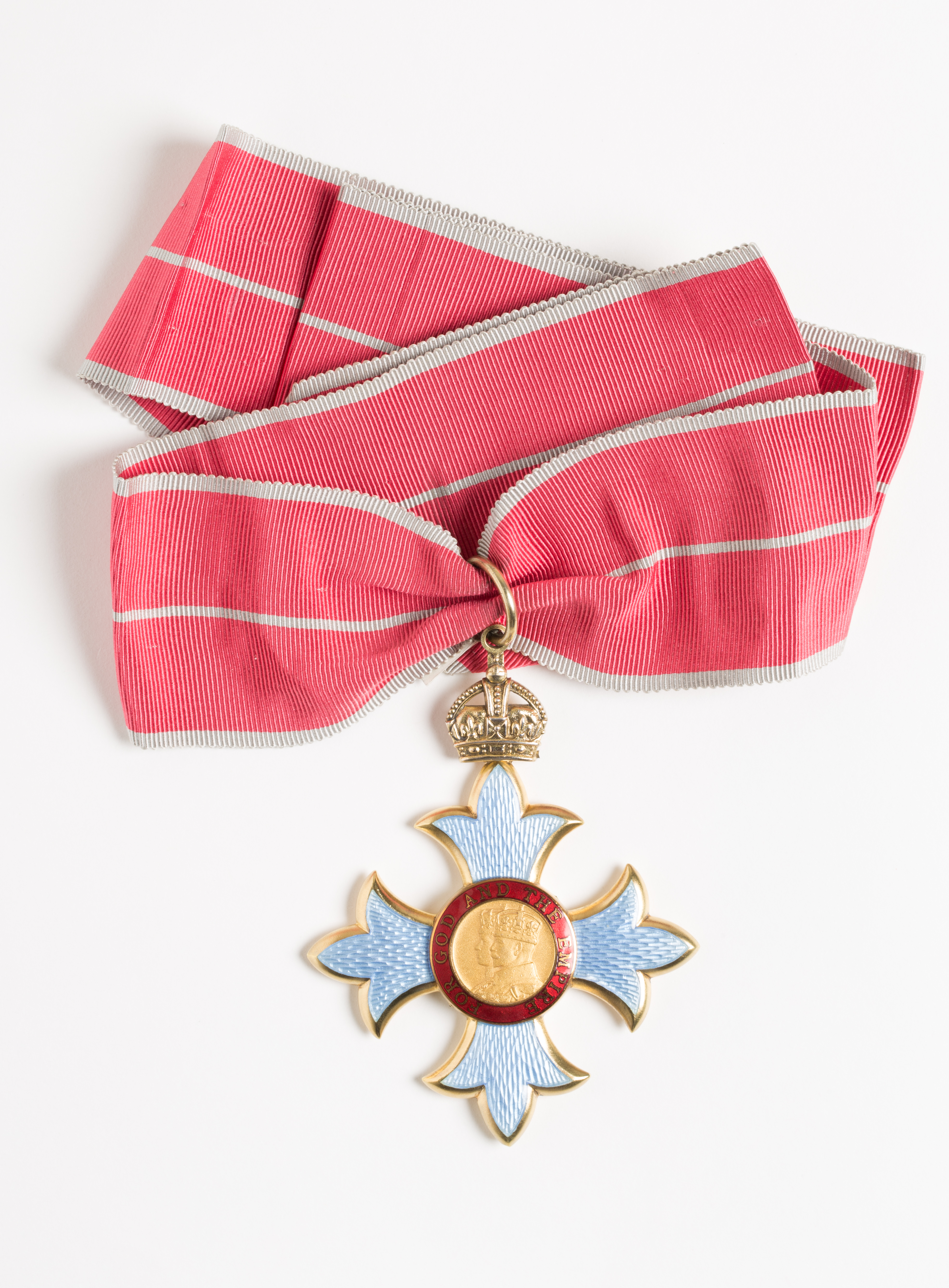
CBE badge and riband (military division)

When the order was founded in 1917, badges, ribands and stars were appointed for wear by recipients. In 1929, mantles, hats and collars were added for recipients of the highest class of the order (GBE). The designs of all these items underwent major changes in 1937.

=== Badge ===
The badge is worn by all members of the order; the size, colour and design depends on the class of award. The badge for all classes is in the form of a cross patonce (having the arms growing broader and floriated toward the end) with a medallion in the centre, the obverse of which bears a crowned image of George V and Queen Mary within a circlet bearing the motto of the Order; the reverse bears George V's Royal and Imperial Cypher. (Prior to 1937 Britannia was shown within the circlet.) The size of the badges varies according to rank: the higher classes have slightly larger badges. The badges of Knights and Dames Grand Cross, Knights and Dames Commander, and Commanders are enamelled, with pale blue crosses, crimson circlets and a gold central medallion. Officers' badges are plain silver-gilt, while those of Members are plain silver.

=== Riband ===
From 1917 until 1937, the badge of the order was suspended on a purple ribbon, with a red central stripe being added for the military division in 1918. Since 1937, the ribbon has been rose-pink with pearl-grey edges (with the addition of a pearl-grey central stripe for the military division). Knights and Dames Grand Cross wear it on a broad riband or sash, passing from the right shoulder to the left hip. Knights Commander and male Commanders wear the badge from a ribbon around the neck; male Officers and Members wear the badge from a ribbon on the left chest; female recipients other than Dames Grand Cross (unless in military uniform) normally wear it from a bow on the left shoulder.

=== Star ===
An oval eight-pointed star is worn, pinned to the left breast, by Knights and Dames Grand Cross; Knights and Dames Commander wear a smaller star composed of "four equal points and four lesser". The star is not worn by the more junior classes. Prior to 1937 each star had in the centre a gold medallion with a figure of Britannia, surrounded by a crimson circlet inscribed with the motto of the order ("For God and the Empire"); since 1937, the effigies of King George V and Queen Mary have been shown within the circlet.

Badges and ribands of the Order of the British Empire (1917–1937)

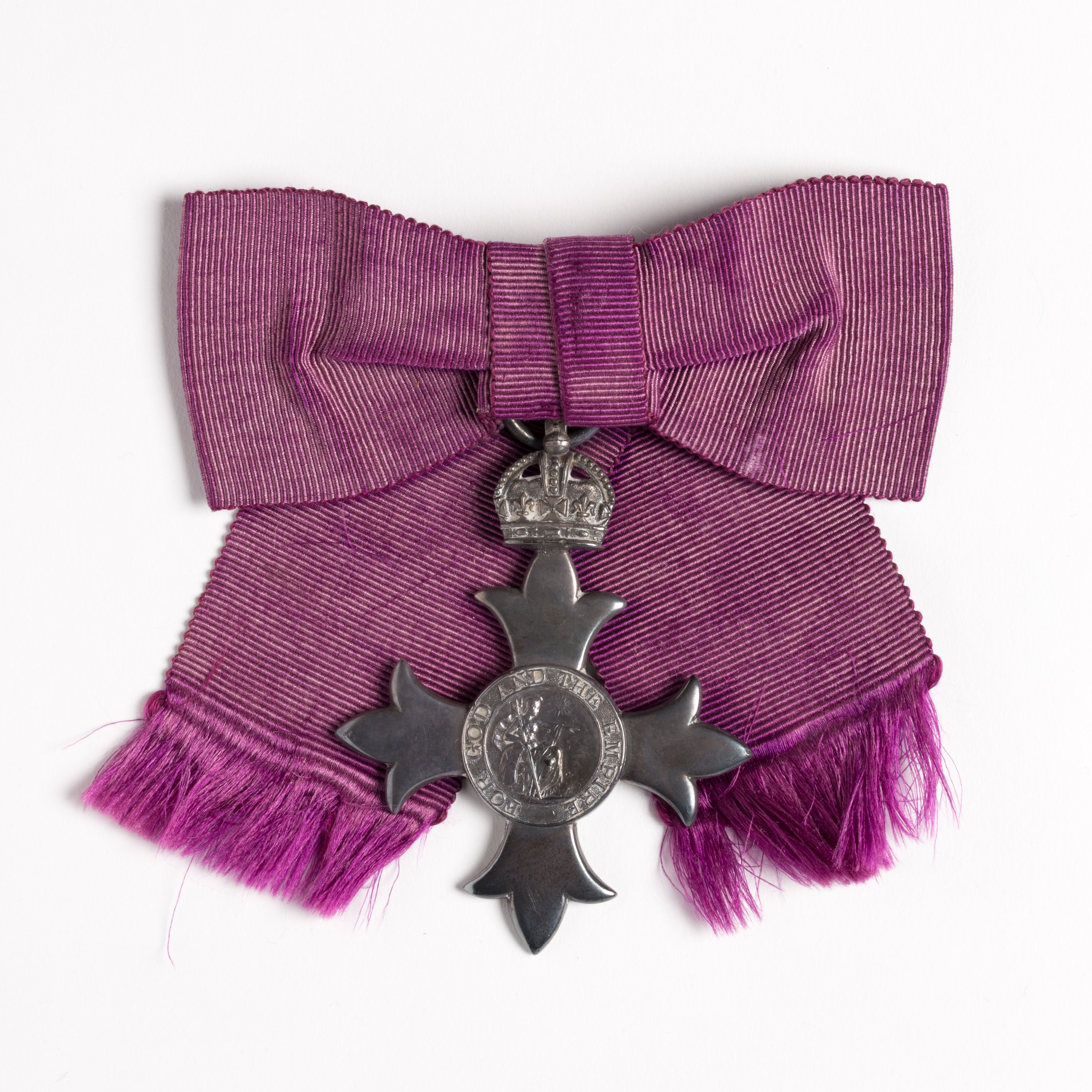
MBE badge as awarded to a female recipient (civil division)

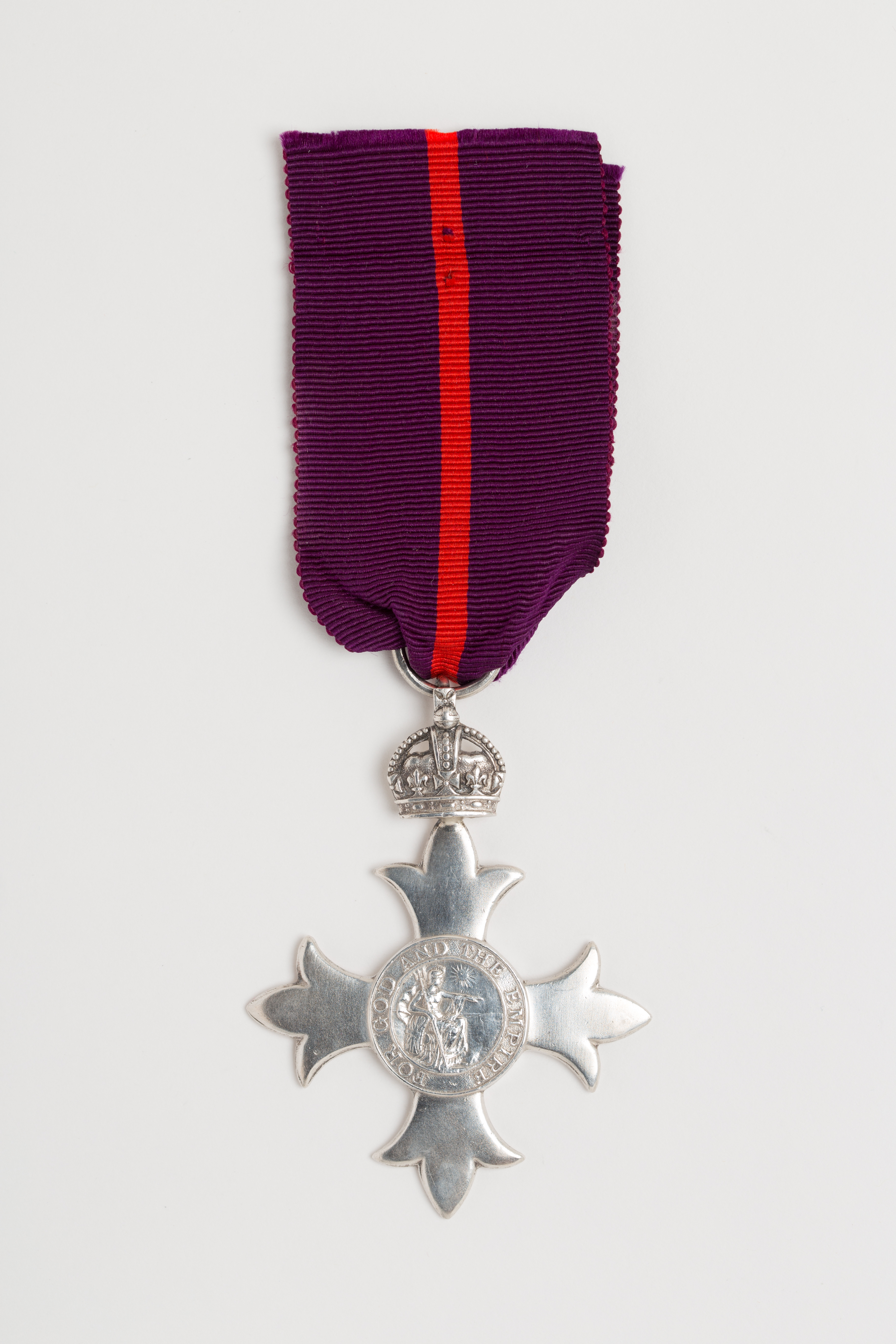
MBE badge and riband (military division)

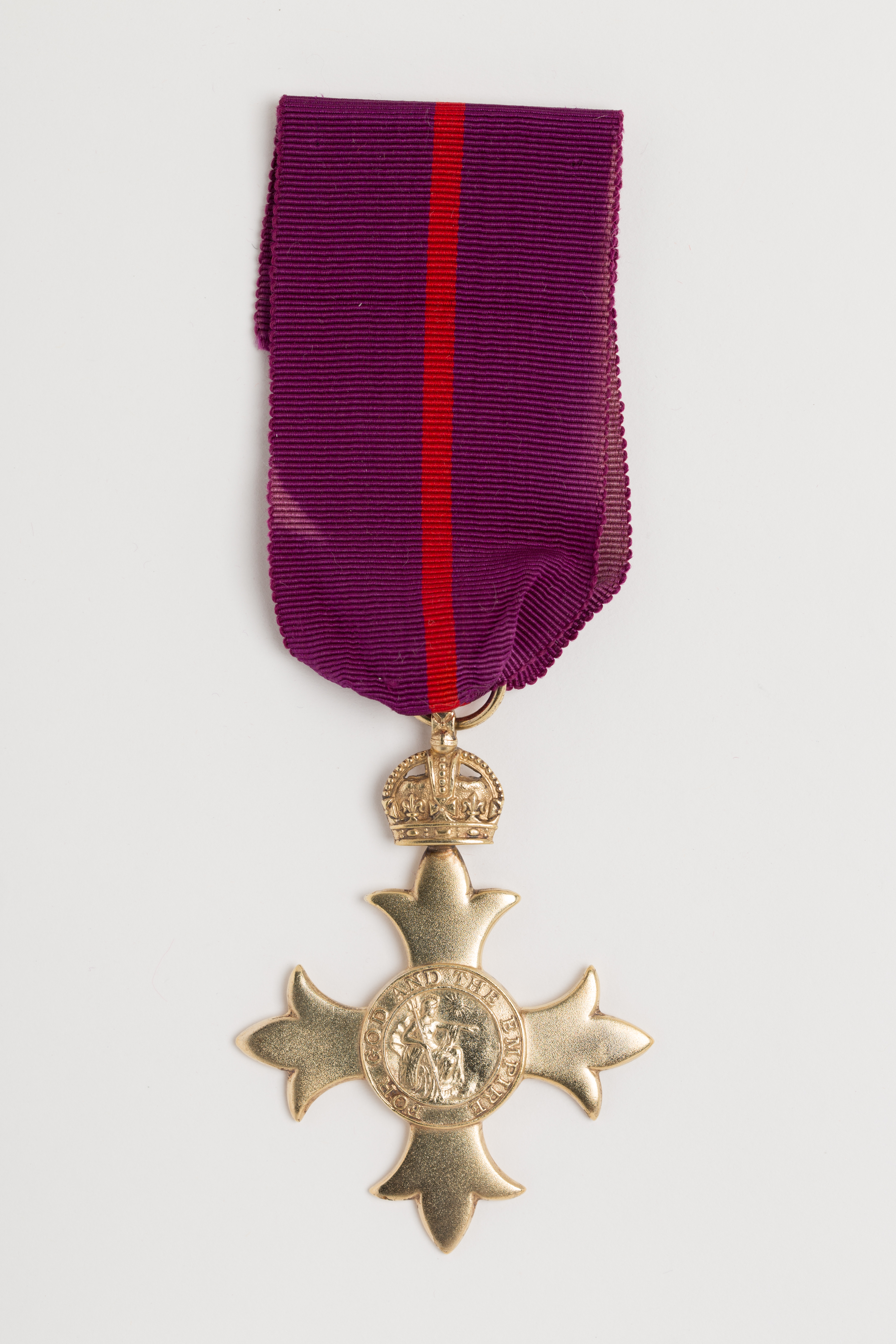
OBE badge and riband (military division)

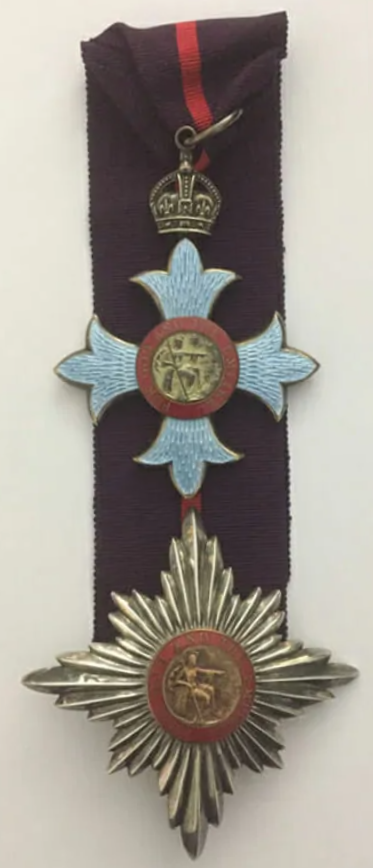
KBE badge, riband and star (military division)

=== Mantles and collars ===
In 1929, to bring the order into line with the other orders of chivalry, members of the first class of the order (GBE) were provided with mantles, hats and collars.

- The mantle is a cloak-like garment of rose-pink satin lined with pearl-grey silk (prior to 1937 it was of purple satin). On the left side is a representation of the star of the order (as pictured below).
- Initially a purple plumed hat was also provided to be worn with the mantle; in 1937, the colour of the hat was changed to black.
- The collar is made of gold. It consists of six medallions depicting the Royal Arms, alternating with six medallions depicting the Royal and Imperial Cypher of George V (GRI, which stands for "Georgius Rex Imperator"). The medallions are linked with gold cables depicting 'sea-lions' and crowns. When collars are worn the badge is suspended from the collar.

Only Knights/Dames Grand Cross wear these elaborate vestments; the hat is now rarely, if ever, worn. Use of the mantle is limited to important occasions (such as quadrennial services and coronations). The mantle is always worn with the collar. Although the mantle was introduced in 1929, very few mantles would have been produced prior to the 1937 design changes, as there were few occasions for wearing them in the intervening years.

On certain days designated by the sovereign, known as "collar days", members attending formal events may wear the order's collar over their military uniform, formal day dress, evening wear or robes of office.

Collars are returned upon the death of their owners, but other insignia may be retained.

The six office-holders of the order wear pearl-grey silk mantles lined with rose-pink satin, having on the right side a purple shield charged with the roundel from the badge. Each of these office-holders wears a unique badge of office, suspended from a gold chain worn around the neck.

Knight and Dame Grand Cross insignia

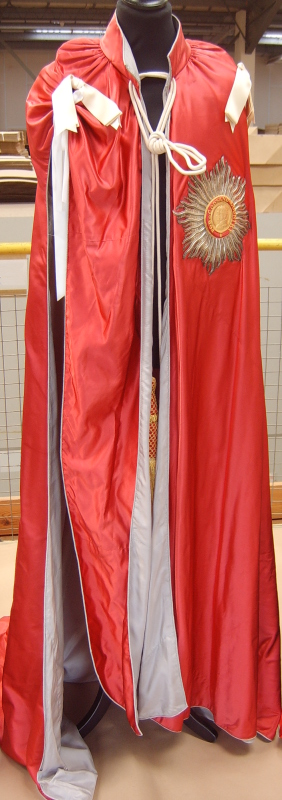
Mantle worn by Knights and Dames Grand Cross (GBE)

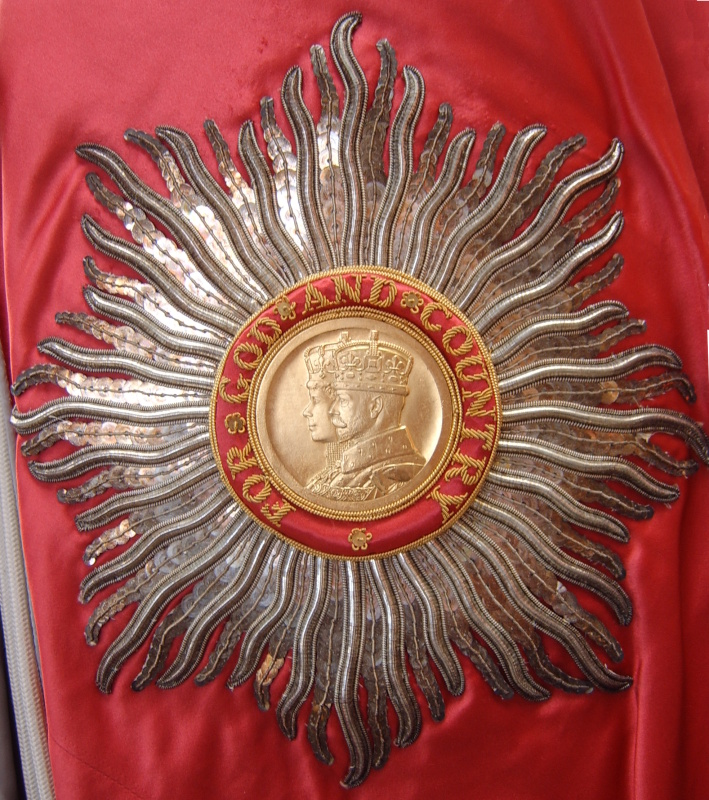
Close-up of the Star on the mantle

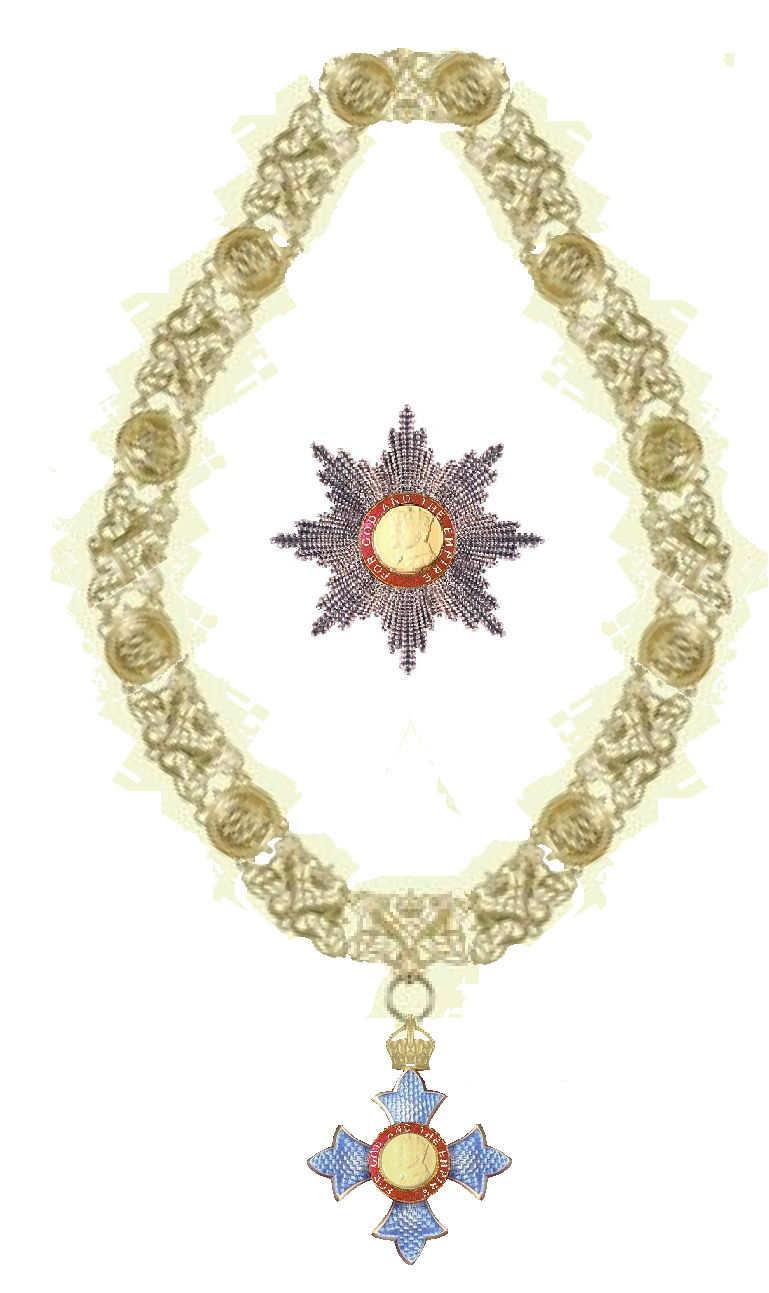
Collar, badge and Star of a Knight or Dame Grand Cross of the Order

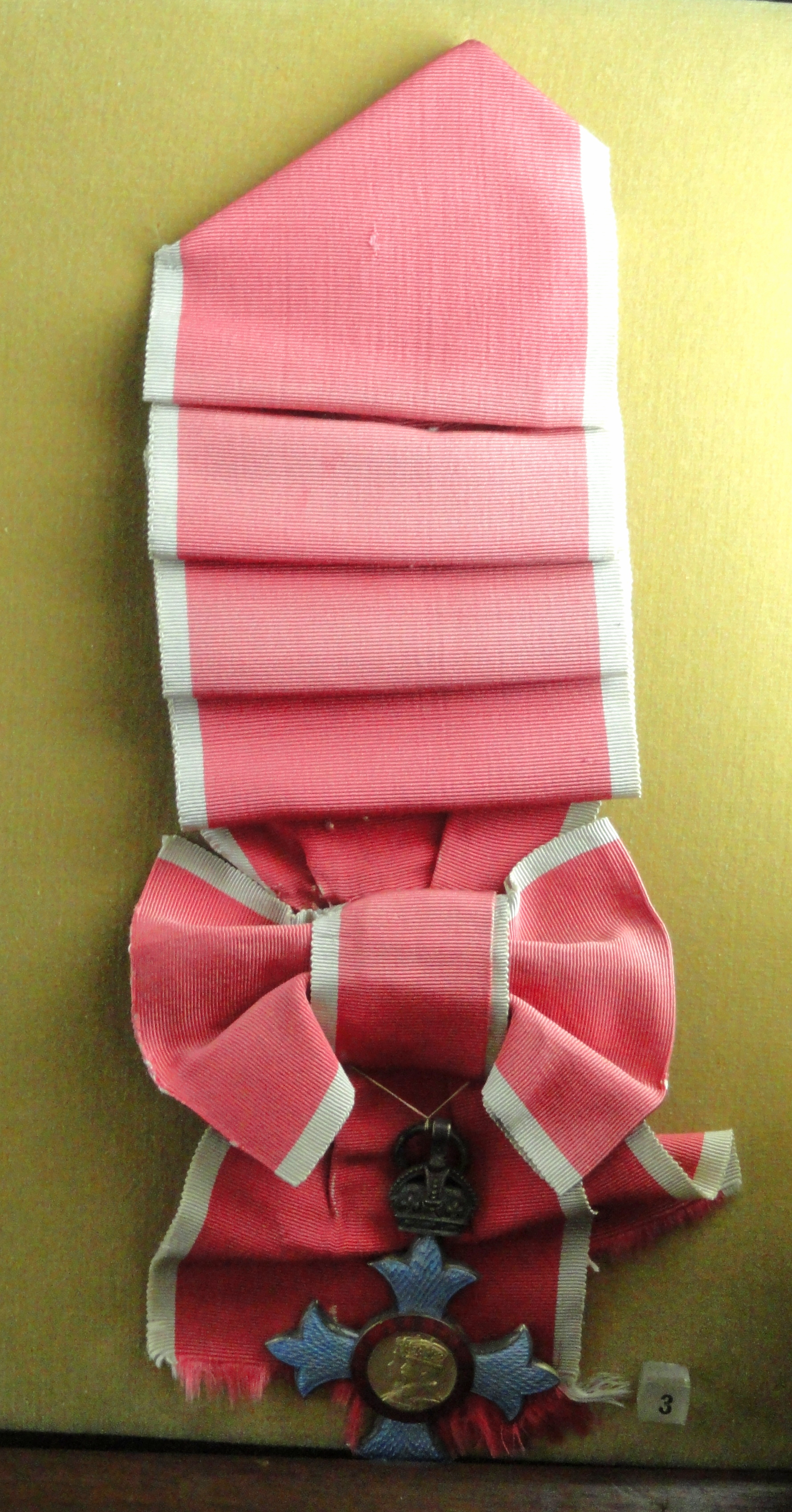
Broad riband and badge of a Knight Grand Cross of the Order

The British Empire Medal is made of silver. On the obverse is an image of Britannia surrounded by the motto, with the words "For Meritorious Service" at the bottom; on the reverse is George V's Imperial and Royal Cypher, with the words "Instituted by King George V" at the bottom. The name of the recipient is engraved on the rim. It comes in both full-sized and miniature versions – the latter for formal white-tie and semi-formal black-tie occasions.

A lapel pin for everyday wear was first announced at the end of December 2006, and is available to recipients of all levels of the order, as well as to holders of the British Empire Medal. The pin design is not unique to any level. The pin features the badge of the order, enclosed in a circle of ribbon of its colours of pink and grey. Lapel pins must be purchased separately by a member of the order. The creation of such a pin was recommended in Sir Hayden Phillips' review of the honours system in 2004.

Order of the British Empire ribbon bars
	Civil	Military
1917–1935		
Since 1936		

== Chapel ==
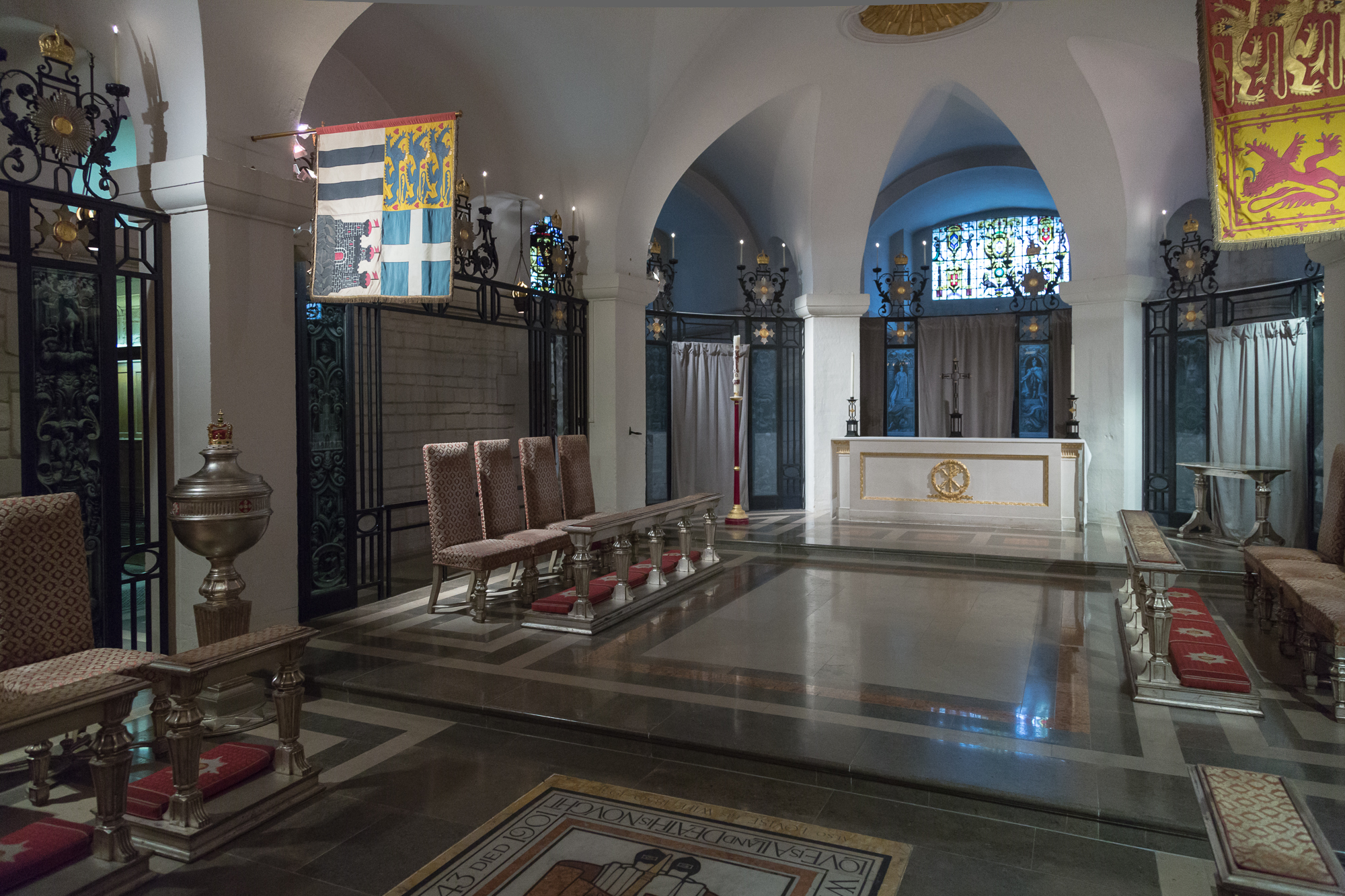
Chapel of the Order in the crypt of St Paul's Cathedral (photographed in 2013). The banners are those of the Sovereign (right) and of the Grand Master (left) of the Order as they were then in office.

The Chapel of the Order of the British Empire is in St Paul's Cathedral. It occupies the far eastern end of the cathedral crypt and was dedicated in 1960. The only heraldic banners normally on display in the chapel are those of the Sovereign of the Order of the British Empire and of the Grand Master of the Order of the British Empire. Rather than using this chapel, the Order now holds its great services upstairs in the nave of the cathedral. In addition to the Chapel of the Order of the British Empire, St Paul's Cathedral also houses the Chapel of the Order of St Michael and St George. Religious services for the whole Order are held every four years; new Knights and Dames Grand Cross are installed at these services.

== Precedence and privileges ==
Knights, Dames and Commanders of the Order may display its circlet around (and suspend its Badge below) their coat of arms.

Knights Grand Cross and Knights Commander prefix Sir, and Dames Grand Cross and Dames Commander prefix Dame, to their forenames. (Note: Never surnames – thus Sir Antony Sher may be shortened to Sir Antony, but not to Sir Sher.) Wives of Knights may prefix Lady to their surnames, but no equivalent privilege exists for husbands of Knights or spouses of Dames. Such forms are not used by peers and princes, except when the names of the former are written out in their fullest forms. Male clergy of the Church of England and the Church of Scotland do not use the title Sir (unless they were knighted before being ordained), as they do not receive the accolade (they are not dubbed "knight" with a sword), although they do append the post-nominal letters; dames do not receive the accolade, and therefore female clergy are free to use the title Dame.

Knights and Dames Grand Cross use the post-nominal GBE; Knights Commander, KBE; Dames Commander, DBE; Commanders, CBE; Officers, OBE; and Members, MBE. The post-nominal for the British Empire Medal is BEM.

Members of all classes of the order are assigned positions in the order of precedence. Wives of male members of all classes also feature on the order of precedence, as do sons, daughters and daughters-in-law of Knights Grand Cross and Knights Commander; relatives of Ladies of the Order, however, are not assigned any special precedence. As a general rule, only wives and children of male recipients are afforded privileges.

Knights and Dames Grand Cross are also entitled to be granted heraldic supporters. They may, furthermore, encircle their arms with a depiction of the circlet (a circle bearing the motto) and the collar; the former is shown either outside or on top of the latter. Knights and Dames Commander and Commanders may display the circlet, but not the collar, surrounding their arms. The badge is depicted suspended from the collar or circlet.

== Current Knights and Dames Grand Cross ==
=== Sovereign and Grand Master ===
Name	Year of appointment	Present age
King Charles III (ex officio)	Sovereign since 2022	78
Queen Camilla LG, LT, ONZ, GCVO, GBE, CSM, CD, PC	2024	79

=== Knights and Dames Grand Cross ===
Military rank (if any)	Name	Known for	Year of appointment	Present age
	Sir Christopher Leaver GBE, KStJ, JP	Lord Mayor of London	1981	89
	Sir Anthony Jolliffe GBE, KStJ, DL	Lord Mayor of London	1982	88
	Sir Alexander Graham GBE	Lord Mayor of London	1990	88
Air Chief Marshal	Sir Patrick Hine GCB, GBE	Joint Commander British Forces Gulf War	1991	94
Air Chief Marshal	Sir Bill Wratten GBE, CB, AFC	Air Officer Commanding-in-Chief RAF Strike Command	1998	87
Air Chief Marshal	Sir Anthony Bagnall GBE, KCB, FRAeS	Vice-Chief of the Defence Staff	2002	81
	Sir Michael Perry GBE, FRSA	Chairman of the Senior Salaries Review Body	2002	92
	Sir Ronnie Flanagan GBE, QPM	Chief Constable of the Police Service of Northern Ireland	2002	77
	Elizabeth Butler-Sloss, Baroness Butler-Sloss GBE, PC	President of the Family Division	2005	93
General	Sir Timothy Granville-Chapman GBE, KCB	Vice-Chief of the Defence Staff	2011	79
	Mervyn King, Baron King of Lothbury KG, GBE, DL, FBA	Governor of the Bank of England	2011	78
	Sir John Parker GBE, FREng	President of the Royal Academy of Engineering	2012	84
	Helene Hayman, Baroness Hayman GBE, PC	Lord Speaker	2012	77
	Sir Keith Mills GBE, DL	Deputy Chairman of the London Organising Committee of the Olympic and Paralympic Games	2013	76
	Sir John Bell GBE, CH, FRS, FMedSci	President of the Office for Strategic Coordination of Health Research	2015	74
Air Chief Marshal	Stuart Peach, Baron Peach KG, GBE, KCB, DL	Chief of the Defence Staff and Chair of the NATO Military Committee	2016	70
	Sir Cyril Chantler GBE, FRCP, FRCPCH, FMedSci	Paediatric nephrologist	2017	87
	Sir Keith Peters GBE FRS FMedSci FRCP FRCPE FRCPath FLSW	Regius Professor of Physic at the University of Cambridge	2018	88
	Sir Christopher Greenwood GBE, CMG, KC	Judge of the International Court of Justice	2018	71
	Rosalyn Higgins, Baroness Higgins GBE, KC	President of the International Court of Justice	2018	89
	Sir Michael Burton GBE, KC	President of the Investigatory Powers Tribunal	2019	80
	Frederick Curzon, 7th Earl Howe GBE, PC	Deputy Leader of the House of Lords and Minister of State for Defence	2021	75
	Dame Sue Ion GBE, FRS, FREng, FIMMM	Engineer and Member of the National Academy of Engineering	2022	71
	Sir Partha Dasgupta GBE, FRS, FBA	Economist and Frank Ramsey Professor Emeritus of Economics at the University of Cambridge	2023	84
	Dame Hermione Lee GBE, FBA, FRSL	Biographer and President of Wolfson College, Oxford	2023	78
	Margaret Beckett, Baroness Beckett GBE, PC	Politician and Secretary of State for Foreign and Commonwealth Affairs	2024	83
	Dame Carol Black GBE, FRCP	Rheumatologist and Chair of the British Library	2024	86
	Sir William Beaumont GBE, DL	Chairman of World Rugby	2024	74
	Sir James McDonald KT, GBE, FRSE, FREng, FInstP, FIET	Engineer, and Principal and Vice-Chancellor of the University of Strathclyde	2024	69
	Sir Ridley Scott GBE	Filmmaker and director	2024	88
	Dame Jenny Abramsky GBE	Journalist, Chancellor of the University of East Anglia and Director of Audio and Music at the British Broadcasting Corporation	2024	80
	Dame Jacqueline Wilson GBE, FRSL	Novelist	2025	80
	Sir Leszek Borysiewicz GBE, DL, FRS, FRCP, FMedSci, FLSW	Immunologist and academic administrator	2025	75
	Sir Simon Wessely GBE, FRS, FMedSci	Psychiatrist	2025	69
Admiral	Sir Tony Radakin GBE, KCB	Chief of the Defence Staff	2026	61
	Dame Parveen Kumar GBE	Gastroenterologist	2026	84
	Sir Jon Cunliffe GBE, CB	Civil servant	2026	73

=== Honorary Knights and Dames Grand Cross ===
See List of current honorary knights and dames of the Order of the British Empire

Country	Name	Office when appointed	Year of appointment	Present age
Jordan	Taher Masri GBE	28th Prime Minister of Jordan	1988	84
Hungary	Zsigmond Járai GBE	7th Minister of Finance of Hungary	1999	74
United States	George Mitchell GBE	8th Chancellor of the Queen's University, Belfast	1999	93
Italy	Nicola Mancino GBE	7th Acting President of Italy	2000	95
Italy	Luciano Violante GBE	10th President of the Chamber of Deputies	2000	85

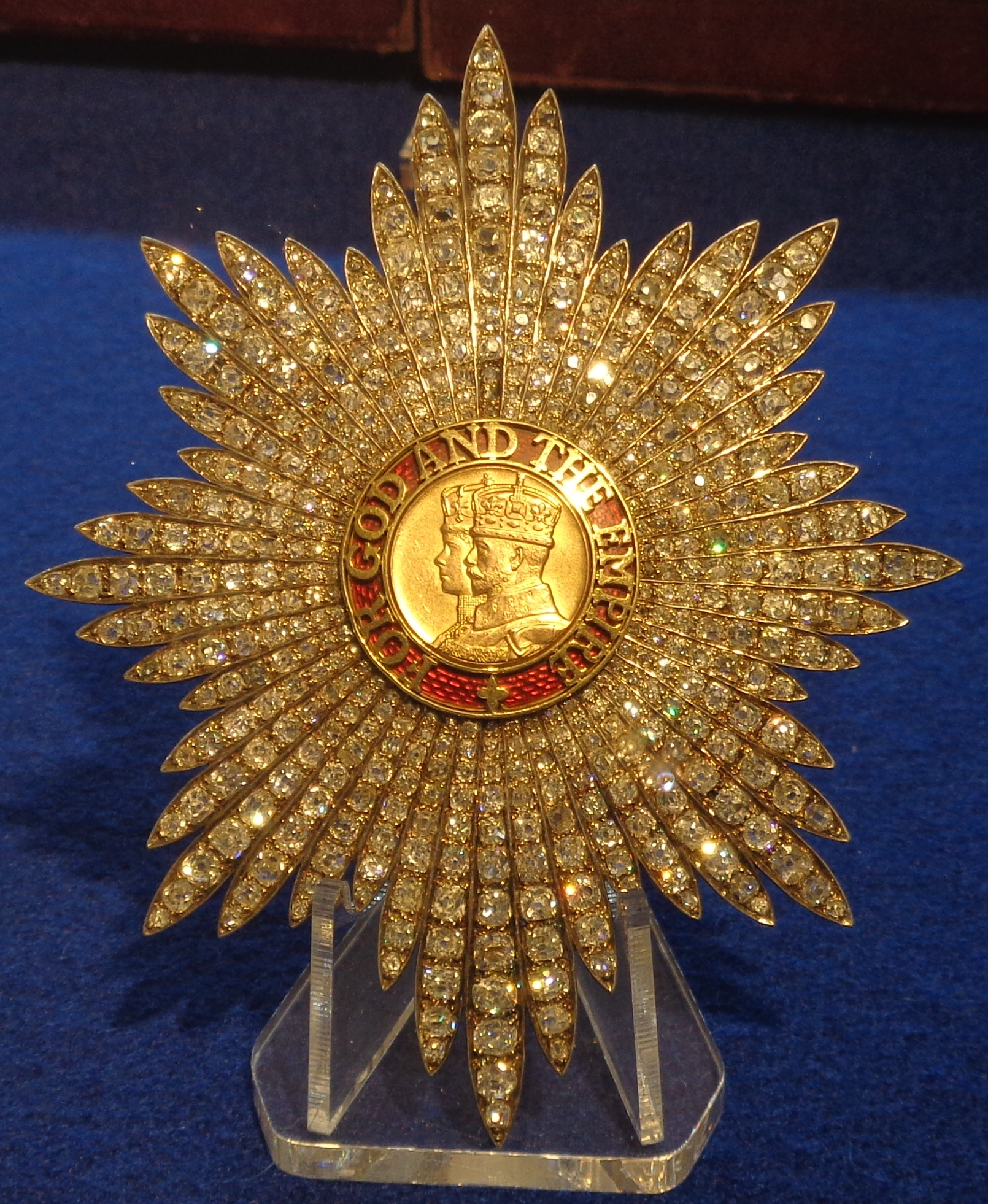
A bejeweled breast star of a Knight or Dame Grand Cross of the Order of the British Empire

== Forfeiture ==
Only the monarch can annul an honour, based on recommendations from the Honours Forfeiture Committee, which considers cases such as criminal convictions or actions that bring the honours system into disrepute. An individual can symbolically renounce their honour by returning the insignia to Buckingham Palace and ceasing to reference their title. However, the honour remains officially held unless formally annulled by the monarch.

For instance, John Lennon returned his MBE insignia in 1969 as a form of protest, but the honour was not formally annulled and remained officially in place.

== People who declined Order of the British Empire honours ==
In 2003, The Sunday Times published a list of the people who had rejected the Order of the British Empire, including David Bowie, John Cleese, Nigella Lawson, Elgar Howarth, L. S. Lowry, George Melly, and J. G. Ballard. In addition, Ballard voiced his opposition to the honours system, calling it "a preposterous charade".

The order has attracted some criticism for its naming having a connection with the idea of the now-extinct British Empire. Benjamin Zephaniah, a British poet of Jamaican and Barbadian descent, publicly rejected appointment as an Officer in 2003 because, he asserted that the word "empire" reminded him of "thousands of years of brutality – it reminds me of how my foremothers were raped and my forefathers brutalised".

The author C. S. Lewis (1898–1963) was named on the last list of honours by George VI in December 1951. Despite being a monarchist, he declined in order to avoid association with any political issues.

In 2019, comedian John Oliver turned down an offer of appointment as an OBE, which would have been part of the Queen's New Year Honours list, later saying: "Why on Earth would I want that?".

The members of the rock band The Beatles were appointed Members in 1965. John Lennon justified his investiture by comparing military membership in the Order: "Lots of people who complained about us receiving the MBE [status] received theirs for heroism in the war – for killing people ... We received ours for entertaining other people. I'd say we deserve ours more". Lennon later returned his MBE insignia on 25 November 1969, as part of his ongoing peace protests.

Other criticism centres on the view that many recipients of the Order are being rewarded with honours for simply doing their jobs; critics say that the Civil Service and Judiciary receive far more orders and honours than leaders of other professions.

Chin Peng, a veteran guerrilla fighter of the Malayan Peoples' Anti-Japanese Army, was appointed as an Officer for his role in fighting against the Japanese occupation of Malaya during World War II, in close co-operation with the British commando Force 136. Several years after the war, his OBE membership was withdrawn by the British government (and became undesirable to Chin Peng himself) when the Communist leader headed his party's guerrilla insurgency against the British Empire during the Malayan Emergency.

== See also ==
- Orders, decorations, and medals of the United Kingdom – the British honours system
- List of knights grand cross of the Order of the British Empire
- List of dames grand cross of the Order of the British Empire
- List of honorary British knights and dames
- United Kingdom order of precedence
- Honours Committee
- Roger Willoughby, For God and the Empire. The Medal of the Order of the British Empire, 1917–1922 (Savannah Publications, London, 2012) ISBN 1-902366-53-0
