= Anthony Jolliffe =

London lord mayor (born 1938)

Sir Anthony Stuart Jolliffe (born 12 August 1938) is a former Lord Mayor of London, serving from 1982 to 1983. He was appointed as a Deputy Lieutenant of the County of Dorset on 5 April 2006. This gave him the Post Nominal Letters "DL" for Life.

In 2013, upon reaching the Mandatory retirement age of 75, he was transferred to the retired list.

He was knighted as a Knight Grand Cross of the Order of the British Empire (GBE) in the Civil Division in October 1982.

He was made a Knight of Justice of the Order of St John (K.StJ) in October 1982.
