= Barking and Dagenham London Borough Council elections =

Class of election in England

A map showing the wards of Barking and Dagenham from 2002 to 2022

Barking and Dagenham London Borough Council in London, England is elected every four years. Since the last boundary changes in 2022 the council has comprised 51 councillors representing 19 wards, with each ward electing two or three councillors. Elections are held every four years.

== Political control ==
The first election to the council was held in 1964, initially operating as a shadow authority until the new system came into full effect the following year. Since the first election to the council in 1964 political control of the council has been held by the Labour Party:

Election	Overall Control	Labour	Conservative	Lib Dem	BNP	Reform	Green	Res./Ind.	Total
1964	Labour Party	45	0	0	–	–	–	4	49
1968	Labour Party	32	13	0	–	–	–	4	49
1971	Labour Party	45	0	0	–	–	–	4	49
1974	Labour Party	45	0	0	–	–	–	4	49
1978	Labour Party	42	3	0	–	–	–	3	48
1982	Labour Party	37	3	3	–	–	–	5	48
1986	Labour Party	35	3	5	–	–	–	5	48
1990	Labour Party	44	0	1	–	–	–	3	48
1994	Labour Party	47	0	1	–	–	–	3	51
1998	Labour Party	47	0	1	–	–	–	3	51
2002	Labour Party	42	2	3	–	–	0	4	51
2006	Labour Party	38	1	0	12	–	0	0	51
2010	Labour Party	51	0	0	0	–	0	0	51
2014	Labour Party	51	0	0	0	–	0	0	51
2018	Labour Party	51	0	–	0	–	0	0	51
2022	Labour Party	51	0	0	–	–	0	0	51
2026	Labour Party	38	0	0	–	9	4	0	51

== Council elections ==
- 1964 Barking London Borough Council election
- 1968 Barking London Borough Council election
- 1971 Barking London Borough Council election
- 1974 Barking London Borough Council election
- 1978 Barking London Borough Council election (boundary changes reduced the number of seats by one)
- 1982 Barking and Dagenham London Borough Council election
- 1986 Barking and Dagenham London Borough Council election
- 1990 Barking and Dagenham London Borough Council election
- 1994 Barking and Dagenham London Borough Council election (boundary changes increased the number of seats by three) (Note: The East London Boroughs (London Borough Boundaries) Order 1993) (Note: The Essex and Greater London (County and London Borough Boundaries) (No.2) Order 1993)
- 1998 Barking and Dagenham London Borough Council election
- 2002 Barking and Dagenham London Borough Council election (boundary changes took place but the number of seats remained the same)
- 2006 Barking and Dagenham London Borough Council election
- 2010 Barking and Dagenham London Borough Council election
- 2014 Barking and Dagenham London Borough Council election
- 2018 Barking and Dagenham London Borough Council election
- 2022 Barking and Dagenham London Borough Council election (boundary changes took place but the number of seats remained the same)
- 2026 Barking and Dagenham London Borough Council election

== Borough result maps ==
1990 results map

2002 results map

2006 results map

2010 results map

2014 results map

2018 results map

2022 results map

2026 results map

== By-election results ==
=== 1964–1968 ===
There were no by-elections.

=== 1968–1971 ===
There were no by-elections.

=== 1971–1974 ===
Chadwell Heath by-election, 14 October 1971
Party	Candidate	Votes	%	±%
Residents	P Jarvis	1,108	68.4	+13.5
Labour	H Pope	492	30.4	+2.7
Communist	D Connor	20	1.2	−3.5
Majority		616	38.0	N/A
Turnout			16.6	−12.7
Registered electors		9,731		
Residents hold		Swing		

Gascoigne by-election, 2 December 1971
Party	Candidate	Votes	%	±%
Labour	George Shaw	1,442	93.2	+10.4
Liberal	M Taylor	106	6.8	N/A
Majority		1,336	86.4	N/A
Turnout			17.4	−18.5
Registered electors		8,882		
Labour hold		Swing		

River by-election, 4 May 1972 (2 seats)
Party	Candidate	Votes	%	±%
Labour	Richard Blackburn	1,263		N/A
Labour	E White	1,226		N/A
Conservative	Ada Horrell	209		N/A
Conservative	T Woodcock	201		N/A
Majority		N/A	N/A	N/A
Turnout			17.4	N/A
Registered electors		8,589		
Labour hold		Swing		
Labour hold		Swing		

=== 1974–1978 ===
There were no by-elections.

=== 1978–1982 ===
Cambell by-election, 29 March 1979
Party	Candidate	Votes	%	±%
Labour	Eric Harris	1,019	48.4	−15.0
Conservative	Brian Cook	906	43.0	+20.9
National Front	John Benjafield	106	5.0	N/A
Liberal	Daniel Felton	76	3.6	−5.9
Majority		113	5.4	N/A
Turnout			28.7	−3.2
Registered electors		7,354		
Labour hold		Swing		

The by-election was called following the death of Cllr Bertie Roycraft.

Gascoigne by-election, 3 May 1979
Party	Candidate	Votes	%	±%
Labour	James Jones	2,258	54.7	−9.3
Conservative	Stanley Bray	1,255	30.4	+11.5
Liberal	David Spender	614	14.9	+3.9
Majority		1,003	24.3	N/A
Turnout			60.6	+35.9
Registered electors		6,865		
Labour hold		Swing		

The by-election was called following the death of Cllr Julia Engwell.

Triptons by-election, 4 December 1980
Party	Candidate	Votes	%	±%
Labour	Alan Stevens	859	68.3	+2.4
Liberal	Edward Bullock	234	18.6	N/A
Conservative	Sylvia Jones	120	9.5	−19.0
National Front	Ronald Ferrett	44	3.5	N/A
Majority		625	49.7	N/A
Turnout			17.4	−10.1
Registered electors		7,244		
Labour hold		Swing		

The by-election was called following the death of Cllr William Bellamy.

=== 1982–1986 ===
Manor by-election, 15 July 1982
Party	Candidate	Votes	%	±%
Labour	Brian Walker	625	60.6	−6.6
Conservative	Leonard Nelson	205	19.9	−8.4
Alliance	David Kingaby	202	19.6	N/A
Majority		420	40.7	N/A
Turnout			21.1	−12.2
Registered electors		4,930		
Labour hold		Swing		

The by-election was called following the death of Cllr Albert Ball.

Chadwell Heath by-election, 5 May 1983
Party	Candidate	Votes	%	±%
Residents	Albert Gibbs	1,184	50.8	−29.5
Conservative	Norman Houlder	490	21.0	N/A
Labour	William Summers	390	16.7	−0.8
Alliance	David Kingaby	266	11.4	N/A
Majority		694	29.8	N/A
Turnout			34.1	−4.6
Registered electors		6,866		
Residents hold		Swing		

The by-election was called following the resignation of Cllr William Hibble.

Longbridge by-election, 9 June 1983
Party	Candidate	Votes	%	±%
Conservative	Constance Foster	2,372	50.4	−3.5
Liberal	Daniel Felton	1,346	28.6	+3.9
Labour	James Jones	984	20.9	−0.6
Majority		1,026	21.8	N/A
Turnout			64.8	+23.3
Registered electors		7,275		
Conservative hold		Swing		

The by-election was called following the resignation of Cllr Edward Reed.

=== 1986–1990 ===
Gascoigne by-election, 18 September 1986
Party	Candidate	Votes	%	±%
Liberal	Susan Vickers	1,450	73.8	+6.3
Labour	David Geary	466	23.7	−8.8
Conservative	Richard Hall	49	2.5	N/A
Majority		984	50.1	N/A
Turnout			31.5	−8.6
Registered electors		6,264		
Liberal hold		Swing		

The by-election was called following the death of Cllr Alan Beadle.

Fanshawe by-election, 10 March 1988
Party	Candidate	Votes	%	±%
Labour	Raymond Parkin	910	77.3	+6.3
Conservative	William Preston	247	21.0	N/A
Communist	Alfred Ott	20	1.7	−2.9
Majority		663	56.3	N/A
Turnout			17.7	−11.6
Registered electors		6,666		
Labour hold		Swing		

The by-election was called following the death of Cllr Ernest Turner.

Marks Gate by-election, 10 March 1988
Party	Candidate	Votes	%	±%
Labour	Maureen Worby	477	64.0	+16.2
Conservative	Terence Malladine	268	36.0	N/A
Majority		209	28.0	N/A
Turnout			35.5	−4.7
Registered electors		2,098		
Labour gain from Independent		Swing		

The by-election was called following the resignation of Cllr Donald Pepper.

River by-election, 3 November 1988
Party	Candidate	Votes	%	±%
Labour	Inder Jamu	542	49.2	+5.9
Conservative	Marcus Needham	294	26.7	+14.6
Liberal Democrats	Susan Bertram	266	24.1	+11.7
Majority		248	22.5	N/A
Turnout			21.7	−9.7
Registered electors		5,073		
Labour hold		Swing		

The by-election was called following the resignation of Cllr Patricia Twomey.

Abbey by-election, 8 June 1989
Party	Candidate	Votes	%	±%
Labour	Mohammad Fani	1,158	59.8	+4.9
Conservative	Nicholas Smith	524	27.1	+10.6
Liberal Democrats	Martin Taylor	253	13.1	−7.0
Majority		634	32.7	N/A
Turnout			28.6	−8.5
Registered electors		6,793		
Labour hold		Swing		

The by-election was called following the resignation of Cllr Abdul Khokhar.

=== 1990–1994 ===
Alibon by-election, 13 February 1992
Party	Candidate	Votes	%	±%
Labour	Patricia Twomey	661	56.3	−22.8
Conservative	Margaret Jones	264	22.5	+9.5
Liberal Democrats	Sean Healy	249	21.2	+13.4
Majority		397	40.7	N/A
Turnout		33.8	26.1	−11.4
Registered electors		4,503		
Labour hold		Swing		

The by-election was called following the resignation of Cllr Trevor Watson.

Chadwell Heath by-election, 2 April 1992
Party	Candidate	Votes	%	±%
Residents	Ronald Curtis	1,107	49.3	−0.4
Labour	Violet Gasson	819	36.5	−1.7
Conservative	John Graham	318	14.2	+14.2
Majority		288	12.8	N/A
Turnout			33.3	−9.0
Registered electors		6,756		
Residents hold		Swing		

The by-election was called following the death of Cllr Raymond Gowland.

=== 1994–1998 ===
Manor by-election, 9 November 1995
Party	Candidate	Votes	%	±%
Labour	June Conyard	657	86.7	+6.0
Liberal Democrats	David Oram	101	13.3	−6.0
Majority		556	73.4	N/A
Turnout			16.6	−21.7
Registered electors				
Labour hold		Swing		

The by-election was called following the resignation of Cllr Alastair Hannah-Rogers.

Parsloes by-election, 9 November 1995
Party	Candidate	Votes	%	±%
Labour	Steven Gill	604	57.1	+8.0
Independent Labour	John Broughton	360	34.1	−2.9
Liberal Democrats	Alan Cooper	93	8.8	−5.1
Majority		244	23.0	N/A
Turnout			22.3	−16.5
Registered electors				
Labour hold		Swing		

The by-election was called following the death of Cllr Joseph Butler.

=== 1998–2002 ===
Goresbrook by-election, 13 May 1999
Party	Candidate	Votes	%	±%
Liberal Democrats	Liam Smith	834	56.3	+22.4
Labour	William Barns	646	43.7	−22.4
Majority		188	12.6	N/A
Turnout		1,485	27.8	+3.3
Registered electors		5,333		
Liberal Democrats gain from Labour		Swing		

The by-election was called following the resignation of Cllr Terence Power.

Eastbury by-election, 14 October 1999
Party	Candidate	Votes	%	±%
Liberal Democrats	Alan Cooper	949	70.8	+19.7
Labour	David Miles	342	25.5	−23.4
Conservative	Brian Cook	50	3.7	N/A
Majority		607	55.3	N/A
Turnout		1,345	31.8	−8.3
Registered electors		4,226		
Liberal Democrats hold		Swing		

The by-election was called following the resignation of Cllr Stephen Churchman.

Marks Gate by-election, 27 September 2001
Party	Candidate	Votes	%	±%
Labour	Michael McCarthy	443	56.6	+23.0
Conservative	Terence Justice	290	37.0	N/A
Liberal Democrats	Jonathan Lopez-Real	27	3.4	−17.0
Green	Geoffrey Hunwicks	23	2.9	N/A
Majority		153	19.6	N/A
Turnout			20.0	−5.0
Registered electors				
Labour hold		Swing		

The by-election was called following the death of Cllr Colin Pond.

=== 2002–2006 ===
Longbridge by-election, 6 February 2003
Party	Candidate	Votes	%	±%
Conservative	Anton Clark	1,186	61.0	+21.6
Labour	Simon Bremner	578	29.7	−12.5
Liberal Democrats	Jonathan Lopez-Real	180	9.3	−9.1
Majority		608	31.3	N/A
Turnout			26.8	−2.8
Registered electors				
Conservative gain from Labour		Swing		

The by-election was called following the death of Cllr Susan Bramley.

Eastbrook by-election, 3 April 2003
Party	Candidate	Votes	%	±%
Labour	Robert Little	847	47.5	−4.3
Labour	Raymond Parkin	839		
Conservative	Susan Connelly	778	43.6	+6.2
Conservative	Kerry Smith	768		
Liberal Democrats	Karen Perry	110	6.7	N/A
Liberal Democrats	Tony Perry	96		
Green	Melissa Serpico	50	2.8	N/A
Green	Francis Koch-Krase	43		
Majority		69	3.9	N/A
Turnout			24.3	−1.3
Registered electors				
Labour hold		Swing		
Labour hold		Swing		

The by-election was called following the death of Cllr Lawrence Bunn and the resignation of Cllr Sidney Summerfield.

Eastbury by-election, 4 December 2003
Party	Candidate	Votes	%	±%
Liberal Democrats	Diane Challis	470	32.9	−23.5
Labour	James McDermott	466	32.6	−11.0
Conservative	Colin King	381	26.7	N/A
Green	Geoff Sheridan	111	7.8	N/A
Majority		4	0.3	N/A
Turnout			19.8	−7.0
Registered electors				
Liberal Democrats hold		Swing		

The by-election was called following the death of Cllr Daniel Felton

Chadwell Heath by-election, 10 June 2004
Party	Candidate	Votes	%	±%
Labour	Nadine Smith	965	39.4	+8.4
Conservative	Mary Justice	899	36.7	+3.2
Residents	Elaine Matthews	468	19.1	−16.5
Green	Geoff Sheridan	117	4.8	N/A
Majority		66	2.7	N/A
Turnout			35.5	+8.8
Registered electors				
Labour gain from Residents		Swing		

The by-election was called following the death of Cllr Robert Jeyes.

Valence by-election, 15 July 2004
Party	Candidate	Votes	%	±%
Labour	Donald Hemmett	761	41.6	−26.0
BNP	Lawrence Rustem	576	31.5	N/A
Conservative	George Woodward	279	15.3	N/A
Liberal Democrats	Angela Lambart	148	8.1	−24.3
Green	Laurence Cleeland	65	3.6	N/A
Majority		185	10.1	N/A
Turnout			27.8	+7.5
Registered electors				
Labour hold		Swing		

The by-election was called following the death of Cllr Vera Cridland.

Goresbrook by-election, 16 September 2004
Party	Candidate	Votes	%	±%
BNP	Daniel Kelley	1,072	51.9	N/A
Labour	Patricia Northover	602	29.1	−32.9
UKIP	Terence Jones	137	6.6	N/A
Conservative	Christine Naylor	111	5.4	N/A
Liberal Democrats	Frederick Tindling	85	4.1	−33.9
Green	Geoff Sheridan	59	2.9	N/A
Majority		470	22.8	N/A
Turnout			28.8	+8.5
Registered electors				
BNP gain from Labour		Swing		

The by-election was called following the resignation of Cllr Matthew Huggins.

Village by-election, 7 October 2004
Party	Candidate	Votes	%	±%
Labour	Philip Waker	1,085	44.7	−10.5
BNP	Lawrence Rustem	934	38.5	N/A
Conservative	Kerry Smith	410	16.9	−6.4
Majority		151	6.2	N/A
Turnout			35.0	+12.6
Registered electors				
Labour hold		Swing		

The by-election was called following the resignation of Cllr Darrin Best.

Becontree by-election, 14 July 2005
Party	Candidate	Votes	%	±%
Labour	Alok Agrawal	1,171	59.8	−6.0
BNP	John Luisis	378	19.3	N/A
Conservative	Anthony Chytry	283	14.4	N/A
UKIP	John Bolton	125	6.4	N/A
Majority		793	40.5	N/A
Turnout			25.9	+8.9
Registered electors				
Labour hold		Swing		

The by-election was called following the death of Cllr John Wainwright.

Goresbrook by-election, 23 July 2005
Party	Candidate	Votes	%	±%
Labour	Warren Northover	1,227	51.0	+22.0
BNP	Lawrence Rustem	791	32.9	−19.0
UKIP	Kerry Smith	216	9.0	+2.4
Conservative	Christine Naylor	167	7.0	+1.6
Majority		436	17.1	N/A
Turnout			33.6	+13.3
Registered electors				
Labour gain from BNP		Swing		

The by-election was called following the resignation of Cllr Daniel Kelley for health reasons.

=== 2006–2010 ===
Chadwell Heath by-election, 3 July 2008
Party	Candidate	Votes	%	±%
Conservative	Terry Justice	842	37.4	+7.5
Labour	Margaret Mullane	691	30.7	−7.0
BNP	James Webb	564	25.1	N/A
UKIP	Kerry Smith	142	6.3	−6.9
Independent	Dorien Mcilroy	11	0.5	−18.7
Majority		151	6.7	N/A
Turnout			33.1	−3.1
Registered electors				
Conservative gain from Labour		Swing		

The by-election was called following the resignation of Cllr Sarah Baillie.

=== 2010–2014 ===
Goresbrook by-election, 8 July 2010
Party	Candidate	Votes	%	±%
Labour	Louise Couling	881	46.6	+3.0
BNP	Richard Barnbrook	642	34.0	+6.8
Liberal Democrats	Felicia Taiwo	136	7.2	−2.1
Conservative	Paul Ayer	108	5.7	−7.4
Independent	Warren Northover	63	3.9	−2.9
UKIP	Nobby Manning	50	2.6	N/A
Independent	Faruk Choudhury	11	0.1	−2.9
Majority		239	20.0	N/A
Turnout		1,841	25.3	−32.5
Registered electors		7,482		
Labour hold		Swing		

The by-election was called following the voiding of the election of Cllr Louise Couling as she was ruled ineligible.

Goresbrook by-election, 19 April 2012
Party	Candidate	Votes	%	±%
Labour	Simon Brenner	1,113	57.8	+14.2
BNP	Bob Taylor	593	30.8	+3.5
UKIP	John Dias-Broughton	91	4.7	N/A
Conservative	Mohammed Riaz	81	4.2	−8.9
Liberal Democrats	Robert Hills	48	2.5	−6.8
Majority		520	20.0	N/A
Turnout		1,926	25.6	−32.2
Registered electors				
Labour hold		Swing		

The by-election was called following the resignation of Cllr Louise Couling for health reasons.

Longbridge by-election, 9 May 2013
Party	Candidate	Votes	%	±%
Labour	Syed Ahammad	1,555	64.3	+24.1
UKIP	Albert Bedwell	466	19.3	+14.6
Conservative	Paul Ayer	284	11.7	−3.2
Liberal Democrats	David Croft	78	3.2	−11.9
BNP	Giuseppe De Santis	37	1.5	−6.7
Majority		1,089	45.0	N/A
Turnout		2,420	29.8	−39.3
Registered electors				
Labour hold		Swing		

The by-election was called following the death of Cllr Nirmal Gill.

=== 2014–2018 ===
There were no by-elections.

=== 2018–2022 ===
Thames by-election, 6 May 2021 (1 seat)
Party	Candidate	Votes	%	±%
Labour	Fatuma Nalule	1,545	42.4	−40.6
Conservative	Andrew Boff	939	25.8	+8.8
Independent	Sabbir Zameer	574	15.8	+15.8
TUSC	Pete Mason	345	9.5	+9.5
CPA	Lucy Baiye-Gaman	158	4.3	+4.3
Liberal Democrats	Afzal Munna	81	2.2	+2.2
Majority		606	16.6	
Turnout		3,642	36.3	+7.9
Registered electors		10,075		
Labour hold		Swing		

The by-election was called following the resignation of Cllr Bill Turner.

=== 2022–2026 ===
Heath by-election, 30 March 2023 (1 seat)
Party	Candidate	Votes	%	±%
Labour	Harriet Spoor	777	62.1	−11.7
Conservative	Joe Lynch	408	32.6	+6.4
Green	Kim Arrowsmith	41	3.3	+3.3
Liberal Democrats	Zygimantas Adomavicius	26	2.1	+2.1
Majority		369	29.5	
Turnout		1,252	21.8	−1.3
Registered electors		5,774		
Labour hold		Swing		

The by-election was called following the death of Cllr Olawale Martins.

Mayesbrook by-election, 14 September 2023 (1 seat)
Party	Candidate	Votes	%	±%
Labour	Summya Sohaib	632	46.8	−22.9
Conservative	Sharfaraz Raj	444	32.9	+2.6
Green	Simon Anthony	192	14.2	+14.2
Liberal Democrats	Olumide Adeyefa	81	6.0	+6.0
Majority		188	13.9	
Turnout		1,349	14.2	−6.4
Registered electors		9,542		
Labour hold		Swing		

The by-election was called following the resignation of Cllr Nashitha Choudhury.

Northbury by-election, 28 November 2024 (1 seat)
Party	Candidate	Votes	%	±%
Labour	Val Masson	561	57.7	−11.1
Green	Simon Anthony	161	16.6	+2.1
Reform	Ryan Edwards	101	10.4	+10.4
Conservative	Angelica Olawepo	100	10.3	−6.4
Liberal Democrats	Olumide Adeyefa	49	5.0	+5.0
Majority		400	41.2	
Turnout		972		
Labour hold		Swing		

The by-election was called following the resignation of Cllr Darren Rodwell.

Village by-election, 28 November 2024 (2 seats)
Party	Candidate	Votes	%	±%
Labour	Julia Williams	776		
Labour	Ajanta Roy	774		
Conservative	Ben Suter	580		
Conservative	Graham Gosling	571		
Green	Kim Arrowsmith	103		
Green	Tope Olawoyin	97		
Liberal Democrats	George Elebiju	70		
Liberal Democrats	Herbert Munangatire	37		
Labour hold		Swing		
Labour hold		Swing		

The by-election was called following the resignation of Cllr Margaret Mullane and the death of Cllr Lee Waker.

Whalebone by-election, 20 February 2025 (1 seat)
Party	Candidate	Votes	%	±%
Labour	Rubina Siddiqui	625	54.9	
Conservative	Angelica Olawepo	287	25.2	
Green	Tope Olawoyin	117	10.3	
Liberal Democrats	Herbert Munangatire	109	9.6	
Majority		338	29.7	
Turnout		1,138		
Labour hold		Swing		

The by-election was called following the death of Cllr Glenda Paddle.

Thames View by-election, 31 July 2025 (1 seat)
Party	Candidate	Votes	%	±%
Labour	Lucy Lee	334	36.1	−25.9
Green	Paul Powlesland	277	29.9	+29.9
Reform	Lewis Holmes	197	21.3	+21.3
Conservative	Andrew Boff	117	12.6	−10.7
Majority		57	6.2	
Turnout		925		
Labour hold		Swing		

The by-election was called following the resignation of Cllr Fatuma Nalule.

=== 2026–2030 ===
None as yet
