= Thames (Barking and Dagenham ward) =

Coordinates: 51.524°N 0.112°E

- Electoral ward for the Barking and Dagenham London Borough Council
- Thames ward boundaries from 2002 to 2022
- Borough: Barking and Dagenham
- County: Greater London
- Electorate: 7,335 (2018)

Current electoral ward
- Created: 1978
- Councillors: 1978–2002: 2; 2002–2022: 3
- Replaced by: Barking Riverside, Eastbury, Goresbrook, Thames View
- GSS code: E05000039 (2002–2022)

Thames was a ward in the London Borough of Barking and Dagenham from 1978 to 2022.

It returned two councillors until 2002 and then three councillors to Barking and Dagenham London Borough Council. The ward included the large Barking Riverside redevelopment area.

== Barking and Dagenham council elections ==
=== 2021 by-election ===
A by-election took place on 6 May 2021, following the resignation of Bill Turner. It was held on the same day as the 2021 London mayoral election and 2021 London Assembly election.

2021 Thames by-election
Party	Candidate	Votes	%	±%
Labour	Fatuma Nalule	1,545	42.4	N/A
Conservative	Andrew Boff	939	25.8	N/A
Independent	Sabbir Zameer	574	15.8	N/A
TUSC	Pete Mason	345	9.5	N/A
CPA	Lucy Ewube Baiye-Gaman	158	4.3	N/A
Liberal Democrats	Afzal Sayeed Munna	81	2.2	N/A
Turnout		3,642	36.3	+7.9
Registered electors		10,075		
Labour hold		Swing		

=== 2018 election ===
The election took place on 3 May 2018.

2018 Barking and Dagenham London Borough Council election: Thames (3)
Party	Candidate	Votes	%	±%
Labour	Josie Channer	2,020	29.2	+5.1
Labour	Cameron Geddes	1,930	27.9	+5.2
Labour	Bill Turner	1,911	27.6	+5.6
Conservative	Amanda Gletherow	413	6.0	N/A
Conservative	Isaac Mukasa	343	5.0	N/A
Conservative	Akhterrasul Shaikh	311	4.5	N/A
Turnout		2,491	28.4	−9.0
Registered electors		8,768		
Labour hold		Swing		
Labour hold		Swing		
Labour hold		Swing		

=== 2014 election ===
The election took place on 22 May 2014.

2014 Barking and Dagenham London Borough Council election: Thames (3)
Party	Candidate	Votes	%	±%
Labour	Josephine Channer	1,720	24.0	N/A
Labour	Cameron Geddes	1,622	22.6	N/A
Labour	Bill Turner	1,573	22.0	N/A
UKIP	Joyce Cracknell	655	9.1	N/A
UKIP	Pamela Dumbleton	644	9.0	N/A
Conservative	Reba Begum	266	3.7	N/A
Socialist Labour	Barry Poulton	245	3.4	N/A
Conservative	Andrew Boff	244	3.4	N/A
Conservative	Bijan Dutta	138	1.9	N/A
TUSC	Joseph Mambulmh	56	0.8	N/A
Turnout		2,626	37.4	−23.2
Registered electors		7,017		
Labour hold		Swing		
Labour hold		Swing		
Labour hold		Swing		

=== 2010 election ===
The election on 6 May 2010 took place on the same day as the United Kingdom general election.

2010 Barking and Dagenham London Borough Council election: Thames (3)
Party	Candidate	Votes	%	±%
Labour	Josephine Channer	2,067	49.4	−2.1
Labour	Barry Poulton	2,042		
Labour	Cameron Geddes	1,978		
BNP	Roy Evans	716	17.1	N/A
BNP	Andrew James Todd	661		
Independent	Fred Barns	610	14.6	−14.8
Conservative	Mark Victor Courtier	422	10.1	−9.0
Liberal Democrats	Saifur Rahman	366	8.8	N/A
Conservative	Moin Ali Quadri	347		
Conservative	Lauretta Ifeanyi Onochie	322		
Independent	Pam Dumbleton	307		
Independent	Terry Wade	268		
Turnout		3,745	60.6	+29.8
Registered electors		6,179		
Labour hold		Swing		
Labour hold		Swing		
Labour hold		Swing		

=== 2006 election ===
The election took place on 4 May 2006.

At the 2006 election Fred Barns, Barry Poulton, and Joan Rawlinson, all of the Labour Party (UK) were reelected.

2006 Barking and Dagenham London Borough Council election: Thames (3)
Party	Candidate	Votes	%	±%
Labour	Fred Barns	1,264	51.5	−16.1
Labour	Joan Rawlinson	1,157		
Labour	Barry Poulton	1,127		
Independent	John Dias-Broughton	721	29.4	N/A
Conservative	Thomas Grey	470	19.1	N/A
Turnout		2,224	30.8	+7.1
Registered electors		7,223		
Labour hold		Swing		
Labour hold		Swing		
Labour hold		Swing		

=== 2002 election ===
The election took place on 2 May 2002.

2002 Barking and Dagenham London Borough Council election: Thames (3)
Party	Candidate	Votes	%	±%
Labour	Fred Barns	980	67.6	−4.9
Labour	Joan Rawlinson	947		
Labour	David Miles	940		
Liberal Democrats	Juan Dias-Broughton	321	22.2	+16.8
Liberal Democrats	Mardell Dias	293		
Liberal Democrats	Lisa Dias-Broughton	293		
Green	Francis Koch-Krause	148	10.2	N/A
Turnout		1,457	23.7	−7.1
Registered electors		6,144		
Labour win (new boundaries)				
Labour win (new boundaries)				
Labour win (new boundaries)				

=== 1998 election ===
The election took place on 7 May 1998.

1998 Barking and Dagenham London Borough Council election: Thames (2)
Party	Candidate	Votes	%	±%
Labour	George Shaw	941	72.5	−4.4
Labour	Royston Patient	914		
Thames View Environmental and Residents Association	Edward Mussett	287	22.1	N/A
Thames View Environmental and Residents Association	Charles Lambert	285		
Liberal Democrats	David Oram	70	5.4	−4.9
Turnout		1,345	30.8	−15.7
Registered electors		4,458		
Labour hold		Swing		
Labour hold		Swing		

=== 1994 election ===
The election took place on 5 May 1994.

1994 Barking and Dagenham London Borough Council election: Thames (2)
Party	Candidate	Votes	%	±%
Labour	George H. Shaw	1,517	76.9	−13.0
Labour	Royston A. J. Patient	1,476		
BNP	Gary J. Hewiit	252	12.8	N/A
Liberal Democrats	Catherine M. Kelly	204	10.3	+0.2
Liberal Democrats	John Kelly	191		
Turnout		1,999	46.5	+4.6
Registered electors		4,300		
Labour hold		Swing		
Labour hold		Swing		

=== 1990 election ===
The election took place on 3 May 1990.

1990 Barking and Dagenham London Borough Council election: Thames (2)
Party	Candidate	Votes	%	±%
Labour	George H. Shaw	1,714	89.9	+46.6
Labour	Royston A. J. Patient	1,680		
Liberal Democrats	Samuel G. Hodge	193	10.1	−2.3
Turnout		1,913	41.9	+10.5
Registered electors		4,564		
Labour hold		Swing		
Labour hold		Swing		

=== 1986 election ===
The election took place on 8 May 1986.

1986 Barking and Dagenham London Borough Council election: Thames (2)
Party	Candidate	Votes	%	±%
Labour	George H. Shaw	1,522	83.2	+21.8
Labour	Royston A. J. Patient	1,457		
Alliance	Robert F. Porter	307	16.8	−3.4
Alliance	Dennis J. Keenan	300		
Turnout			39.6	−4.1
Registered electors		4,757		
Labour hold		Swing		
Labour hold		Swing		

=== 1982 election ===
The election took place on 6 May 1982.

1982 Barking and Dagenham London Borough Council election: Thames (2)
Party	Candidate	Votes	%	±%
Labour	George H. Shaw	1,273	61.4	−24.7
Labour	Royston A. J. Patient	1,171		
Alliance	Martin F. Taylor	419	20.2	+8.3
Alliance	Dennis J. Keenan	417		
Conservative	Marion S. Nelson	382	18.4	N/A
Conservative	Dorothea C. Reed	365		
Turnout			43.7	+5.2
Registered electors		4,898		
Labour hold		Swing		
Labour hold		Swing		

== Barking council elections ==
=== 1978 election ===
The election took place on 4 May 1978.

1978 Barking London Borough Council election: Thames (2)
Party	Candidate	Votes	%	±%
Labour	Douglas J. Waters	1,649	86.1	N/A
Labour	George H. Shaw	1,647		N/A
Liberal	Ronald H. Stolton	267	13.9	N/A
Turnout			38.5	N/A
Registered electors		5,147		
Labour win (new seat)				
Labour win (new seat)				
