= Chadwell Heath (ward) =

Electoral ward in London, England

- Electoral ward for the Barking and Dagenham London Borough Council
- Chadwell Heath ward boundaries since 2022
- Borough: Barking and Dagenham
- County: Greater London
- Population: 14,086 (2021) (Note: 2021 Census data reported for 2022 ward boundaries)
- Electorate: 8,985 (2022)
- Area: 3.559 square kilometres (1.374 sq mi)

Current electoral ward
- Created: 1965
- Number of members: 1965–1978: 4; 1978–present: 3
- Councillors: Sade Bright; Simon Perry; Michael Pongo
- GSS code: E05000029 (2002–2022); E05014058 (2022–present)

Chadwell Heath is an electoral ward in the London Borough of Barking and Dagenham. The ward has existed since the creation of the borough on 1 April 1965 and was first used in the 1964 elections. It returns councillors to Barking and Dagenham London Borough Council.

== List of councillors ==
Term	Councillor	Party
1964–1978	D Grandison	Residents
1964–1971	C Jillings	Residents
1964–1982	Cyril Ayres	Residents
1964–1968	H Jones	Residents
1968–1982	Peggy Miller	Residents
1971–1982	H Jones	Residents
1971–1974	P Jarvis	Residents
1974–1982	Joan Harper	Residents
1982–1994	Raymond Gowland	Residents
1982–2006	Robert Jeyes	Residents
1982–1983	William Hibble	Residents
1983–2002	Albert Gibbs	Residents
1994–2006	Ronald Curtis	Residents
2002–2006	Terry Justice	Conservative
2006–2010	Sarah Baillie	Labour
2006–2010	Nadine Smith	Labour
2006–2010	Shaun Carroll	Labour
2010–2014	Milton McKenzie	Labour
2010–2018	Jeff Wade	Labour
2010–2018	Sam Tarry	Labour
2014–present	Sade Bright	Labour
2018–present	Simon Perry	Labour
2018–2022	Mohammed Khan	Labour
2022–present	Michael Pongo	Labour

== Summary ==
Councillors elected by party at each general borough election.

- Residents
- Conservative
- Labour

== Barking and Dagenham council elections since 2022 ==
There was a revision of ward boundaries in Barking and Dagenham in 2022. The southern boundary of the ward was aligned fully to High Road and some streets were gained to the east of Whalebone Lane North.

=== 2026 election ===
The election took place on 7 May 2026.

2026 Barking and Dagenham London Borough Council election: Chadwell Heath
Party	Candidate	Votes	%	±%
Labour	Sade Bright	1,137	37.4	−35.2
Labour	Simon Perry	1,135	37.4	−33.9
Labour	Michel Pongo	994	32.7	−29.9
Reform	Paul Hewson	838	27.6	N/A
Green	Vivian Ebal	800	26.3	N/A
Green	Debbie Rosaman	766	25.2	N/A
Reform	Fuad Ashraf	730	24.0	N/A
Reform	Muhammad Hamza	706	23.2	N/A
Conservative	Kamini Sharma	364	12.0	N/A
Conservative	Arinze Nwanna	306	10.1	N/A
Liberal Democrats	Mohib Shah	290	9.5	N/A
Conservative	Anonta Sutradhar	281	9.2	N/A
Turnout		3,037	31.6	+5.4
Registered electors		9,605		
Labour hold		Swing	-30.2	
Labour hold		Swing	-30.1	
Labour hold		Swing	-28.8	

=== 2022 election ===
The election took place on 5 May 2022.

2022 Barking and Dagenham London Borough Council election: Chadwell Heath
Party	Candidate	Votes	%	±%
Labour	Sade Bright	1,723	30.9	N/A
Labour	Simon Perry	1,693	30.4	N/A
Labour	Michael Pongo	1,486	26.7	N/A
Conservative	Martin Lynch	672	12.1	N/A
Turnout		2,374	26.2	N/A
Registered electors		7,454		
Labour win (new boundaries)				
Labour win (new boundaries)				
Labour win (new boundaries)				

== 2002–2022 Barking and Dagenham council elections ==
Chadwell Heath ward boundaries from 2002 to 2022

There was a revision of ward boundaries in Barking and Dagenham in 2002. Chadwell Heath gained territory that had been the Marks Gate ward to the north and the southern boundary was retracted to became mostly aligned to the High Road.

=== 2018 election ===
The election took place on 3 May 2018.

2018 Barking and Dagenham London Borough Council election: Chadwell Heath
Party	Candidate	Votes	%	±%
Labour	Sade Bright	1,528	23.4	+3.7
Labour	Simon Perry	1,510	23.1	N/A
Labour	Mohammed Khan	1,447	22.1	N/A
Conservative	Terry Justice	746	11.4	N/A
Conservative	Monica Mohan	653	10.0	N/A
Conservative	Glyn Lewis	651	10.0	N/A
Turnout		2,378	31.9	−4.6
Registered electors		7,454		
Labour hold		Swing		
Labour hold		Swing		
Labour hold		Swing		

=== 2014 election ===
The election took place on 22 May 2014.

2014 Barking and Dagenham London Borough Council election: Chadwell Heath
Party	Candidate	Votes	%	±%
Labour	Jeff Wade	1,416	20.1	N/A
Labour	Sade Bright	1,389	19.7	N/A
Labour	Sam Tarry	1,356	19.2	N/A
UKIP	Ronald Curtis	869	12.3	N/A
UKIP	Ingrid Spindler	805	11.4	N/A
Conservative	Albert Sacky	377	5.3	N/A
Conservative	Jamil Miah	354	5.0	N/A
Green	Debbie Rosaman	320	4.5	N/A
Liberal Democrats	David Croft	160	2.3	N/A
Turnout		2,710	36.5	−24.9
Registered electors		7,424		
Labour hold		Swing		
Labour hold		Swing		
Labour hold		Swing		

=== 2010 election ===
The election on 6 May 2010 took place on the same day as the United Kingdom general election.

2010 Barking and Dagenham London Borough Council election: Chadwell Heath
Party	Candidate	Votes	%	±%
Labour	Milton McKenzie	1,984	39.3	+1.6
Labour	Jeff Wade	1,818		
Labour	Sam Tarry	1,785		
Conservative	Terry Justice	1,411	27.9	+2.0
Conservative	Maire Justice	1,306		
Conservative	Cathal Gough	1,121		
BNP	George Woodward	594	11.8	N/A
Liberal Democrats	Gina Probert	481	9.5	N/A
UKIP	Kerry Smith	369	7.3	−5.9
Green	Debbie Rosaman	213	4.2	N/A
Green	Angie Cooke	201		
Green	Mike Ridout	159		
Turnout		4,210	61.4	+29.2
Registered electors		6,859		
Labour hold		Swing		
Labour hold		Swing		
Labour hold		Swing		

=== 2006 election ===
The election took place on 4 May 2006.

2006 Barking and Dagenham London Borough Council election: Chadwell Heath
Party	Candidate	Votes	%	±%
Labour	Sarah Baillie	1,101	37.7	+6.7
Labour	Nadine Smith	999		
Labour	Shaun Carroll	987		
Conservative	Terry Justice	873	29.9	−3.6
Conservative	Maire Justice	734		
Conservative	Sharron Chytry	583		
Independent	Ronald Curtis	560	19.2	−16.4
UKIP	Doreen Tucker	385	13.2	N/A
UKIP	Ronald Long	376		
Turnout		2,523	36.2	+9.5
Registered electors		6,972		
Labour gain from Residents		Swing		
Labour gain from Residents		Swing		
Labour gain from Conservative		Swing		

=== 2002 election ===
The election took place on 2 May 2002.

2002 Barking and Dagenham London Borough Council election: Chadwell Heath
Party	Candidate	Votes	%	±%
Residents	Ronald Curtis	682	35.6	−26.6
Residents	Robert Jeyes	667		
Conservative	Terry Justice	642	33.5	+24.2
Residents	Donna Lewis	624		
Labour	Patricia Northover	594	31.0	+2.4
Labour	Abdul Aziz	513		
Labour	Alok Agrawal	485		
Turnout		1,827	26.7	−5.0
Registered electors		6,855		
Residents win (new boundaries)				
Residents win (new boundaries)				
Conservative win (new boundaries)				

== 1994–2002 Barking and Dagenham council elections ==
The boundaries of the ward were adjusted on 1 April 1994.

=== 1998 election ===
The election took place on 7 May 1998.

1998 Barking and Dagenham London Borough Council election: Chadwell Heath
Party	Candidate	Votes	%	±%
Residents	Ronald Curtis	1,347	62.2	+13.7
Residents	Albert Gibbs	1,344		
Residents	Robert Jeyes	1,287		
Labour	Donna Beckett	619	28.6	−10.1
Labour	Peter Metia	593		
Labour	Nana-Aba Andah	537		
Conservative	Mary Justice	201	9.3	+2.4
Turnout		2,136	31.7	−8.9
Registered electors		6,738		
Residents hold		Swing		
Residents hold		Swing		
Residents hold		Swing		

=== 1994 election ===
The election took place on 5 May 1994.

1994 Barking and Dagenham London Borough Council election: Chadwell Heath
Party	Candidate	Votes	%	±%
Residents	Albert Gibbs	1,362	48.5	−1.2
Residents	Ronald Curtis	1,359		
Residents	Robert Jeyes	1,269		
Labour	Violet Gasson	1,089	38.7	−0.5
Labour	Vera Cridland	1,071		
Labour	Malcolm Murchie	956		
Conservative	Mark Gilding	193	6.9	−5.2
Conservative	John Graham	183		
Liberal Democrats	Anil Fernando	167	5.9	N/A
Conservative	Sharon Keefe	143		
Turnout		2,776	40.6	−1.7
Registered electors		6,835		
Residents win (new boundaries)				
Residents win (new boundaries)				
Residents win (new boundaries)				

== 1978–1994 Barking and Dagenham council elections ==
Chadwell Heath ward boundaries from 1978 to 1994

There was a revision of ward boundaries in Barking in 1978. The part of the ward north of Eastern Avenue became a new ward of Marks Gate. The name of the borough and council changed from Barking to Barking and Dagenham on 1 January 1980.

=== 1990 election ===
The election took place on 3 May 1990.

1990 Barking and Dagenham London Borough Council election: Chadwell Heath
Party	Candidate	Votes	%	±%
Residents	Albert Gibbs	1,456	51.8	−18.7
Residents	Raymond Gowland	1,456		
Residents	Robert Jeyes	1,360		
Labour	Violet Gasson	1,120	36.4	+6.9
Labour	Hilda Jones	942		
Labour	Julie West	938		
Conservative	David Jackson	353	11.9	N/A
Conservative	Karen Smith	328		
Conservative	Nicholas Smith	298		
Rejected ballots		2	0.1	N/A
Turnout		2,913	42.3	+4.7
Registered electors		6,881		
Residents hold		Swing		
Residents hold		Swing		
Residents hold		Swing		

=== 1986 election ===
The election took place on 8 May 1986.

1986 Barking and Dagenham London Borough Council election: Chadwell Heath
Party	Candidate	Votes	%	±%
Residents	Albert Gibbs	1,643	70.5	−9.8
Residents	Raymond Gowland	1,585		
Residents	Robert Jeyes	1,585		
Labour	Terence Collins	689	29.5	+12.0
Labour	Charles Chown	684		
Labour	Michael O'Shea	625		
Turnout			37.6	−1.1
Registered electors		6,843		
Residents hold		Swing		
Residents hold		Swing		
Residents hold		Swing		

=== 1983 by-election ===
The by-election took place on 5 May 1983, following the resignation of William Hibble.

1983 Chadwell Heath by-election
Party	Candidate	Votes	%	±%
Residents	Albert Gibbs	1,184	50.8	−29.5
Conservative	Norman Houlder	490	21.0	+21.0
Labour	William Summers	390	16.7	−0.8
Alliance	David Kingaby	266	11.4	+11.4
Majority		694	29.8	N/A
Turnout			34.1	−4.6
Registered electors		6,866		
Residents hold		Swing		

=== 1982 election ===
The election took place on 6 May 1982.

1982 Barking and Dagenham London Borough Council election: Chadwell Heath
Party	Candidate	Votes	%	±%
Residents	Raymond Gowland	2,024	80.3	+4.2
Residents	Robert Jeyes	2,012		
Residents	William Hibble	1,972		
Labour	William Summers	440	17.5	−4.7
Labour	Morris Ness	411		
Labour	Joanne Williams	384		
Communist	Alfred Ott	57	2.3	+0.6
Turnout			38.7	−1.4
Registered electors		6,888		
Residents hold		Swing		
Residents hold		Swing		
Residents hold		Swing		

=== 1978 election ===
The election took place on 4 May 1978.

1978 Barking London Borough Council election: Chadwell Heath
Party	Candidate	Votes	%	±%
Residents	Cyril Ayres	2,100	76.1	
Residents	Joan Harper	2,097		
Residents	Peggy Miller	2,033		
Labour	Eric Harris	613	22.2	
Labour	James Jones	536		
Labour	Eric Mansell	495		
Communist	Alfred Ott	46	1.7	
Turnout			40.1	
Registered electors		6,899		
Residents win (new boundaries)				
Residents win (new boundaries)				
Residents win (new boundaries)				

== 1964–1978 Barking council elections ==
External images
- Chadwell Heath ward boundaries from 1965 to 1978 (south)
- Chadwell Heath ward boundaries from 1965 to 1978 (north)

=== 1974 election ===
The election took place on 2 May 1974.

1974 Barking London Borough Council election: Chadwell Heath
Party	Candidate	Votes	%	±%
Residents	D Grandison	1,783	54.9	+1.2
Residents	Cyril Ayres	1,763		N/A
Residents	Peggy Miller	1,733		N/A
Residents	Joan Harper	1,698		N/A
Labour	F Coomber	898	27.7	−13.9
Labour	L Henstock	872		N/A
Labour	J O'Donogue	841		N/A
Labour	J Tweed	817		N/A
Conservative	G Hyams	413	12.7	N/A
Conservative	L Hyams	360		N/A
Communist	D Connor	151	4.7	−0.1
Turnout			29.9	−0.9
Registered electors		9,459		
Residents hold		Swing		
Residents hold		Swing		
Residents hold		Swing		
Residents hold		Swing		

=== 1971 by-election ===
The by-election took place on 14 October 1971.

1971 Chadwell Heath by-election
Party	Candidate	Votes	%	±%
Residents	P Jarvis	1,108	68.4	+13.5
Labour	H Pope	492	30.4	+2.7
Communist	D Connor	20	1.2	−3.5
Majority		616	38.0	N/A
Turnout			16.6	−12.7
Registered electors		9,731		
Residents hold		Swing		

=== 1971 election ===
The election took place on 13 May 1971.

1971 Barking London Borough Council election: Chadwell Heath
Party	Candidate	Votes	%	±%
Residents	Peggy Miller	1,719	53.7	−21.1
Residents	H Jones	1,633		N/A
Residents	D Grandison	1,631		N/A
Residents	Cyril Ayres	1,575		N/A
Labour	H Pope	1,331	41.6	+23.2
Labour	W Webb	1,308		N/A
Labour	V Pope	1,292		N/A
Labour	Robert Crane	1,267		N/A
Communist	D Connor	153	4.8	−1.9
Turnout			30.8	+1.5
Registered electors		9,669		
Residents hold		Swing		
Residents hold		Swing		
Residents hold		Swing		
Residents hold		Swing		

=== 1968 election ===
The election took place on 9 May 1968.

1968 Barking London Borough Council election: Chadwell Heath
Party	Candidate	Votes	%	±%
Residents	D Grandison	2,054	74.8	+28.8
Residents	Peggy Miller	2,041		N/A
Residents	C Jillings	2,040		N/A
Residents	Cyril Ayres	2,032		N/A
Labour	E Bradley	506	18.4	−14.4
Labour	F Rusha	496		N/A
Labour	F Goodger	485		N/A
Labour	W Webb	481		N/A
Communist	D Connor	185	6.7	+3.8
Turnout			29.3	−2.1
Registered electors		9,276		
Residents hold		Swing		
Residents hold		Swing		
Residents hold		Swing		
Residents hold		Swing		

=== 1964 election ===
The election took place on 7 May 1964.

1964 Barking London Borough Council election: Chadwell Heath
Party	Candidate	Votes	%	±%
Residents	D Grandison	1,636	46.0	N/A
Residents	C Jillings	1,577		N/A
Residents	Cyril Ayres	1,560		N/A
Residents	H Jones	1,495		N/A
Labour	S Warr	1,168	32.8	N/A
Labour	J Moore	1,088		N/A
Labour	J Lawrence	1,088		N/A
Labour	C Ayrton	1,059		N/A
Conservative	R Holland	651	18.3	N/A
Conservative	A Cobban	606		N/A
Conservative	G Santry	606		N/A
Conservative	G Herer	583		N/A
Communist	D Connor	104	2.9	N/A
Turnout		3,391	31.4	N/A
Registered electors		9,076		
Residents win (new seat)				
Residents win (new seat)				
Residents win (new seat)				
Residents win (new seat)				
