= Longbridge (Barking and Dagenham ward) =

Electoral ward in London, England

- Electoral ward for the Barking and Dagenham London Borough Council
- Longbridge ward boundaries since 2022
- Borough: Barking and Dagenham
- County: Greater London
- Population: 13,308 (2021) (Note: 2021 Census data reported for 2022 ward boundaries)
- Electorate: 8,922 (2022)
- Area: 1.641 square kilometres (0.634 sq mi)

Current electoral ward
- Created: 1965
- Number of members: 3
- Councillors: Rocky Gill; Faruk Choudhury; Mashkura Mazid
- GSS code: E05000035 (2002–2022); E05014064 (2022–present)

Longbridge is an electoral ward in the London Borough of Barking and Dagenham, returning councillors to Barking and Dagenham London Borough Council.

== List of councillors ==
Term	Councillor	Party
1964–1968	E. McKee	Labour
1964–1968	J. Ward	Labour
1964–1968	L. Senior	Labour
1964–1968	F. Edgecombe	Labour
1968–1971	V. Pool	Conservative
1968–1971	C. Pool	Conservative
1968–1971	J. Dean	Conservative
1968–1971	D. Barnett	Conservative
1971–1974	R. Godfrey	Labour
1971–1974	M. Spencer	Labour
1971–1978	M. Ness	Labour
1971–1978	M. O'Shea	Labour
1974–1978	J. Cavanagh	Labour
1974–1978	M. Cole	Labour
1982–1983	Edward Reed	Conservative
1983–1986	Constance Foster	Conservative
1982–1990; 2002–2006	Brian Cook	Conservative
1982–1990	John Seaman	Conservative
1986–1990	Janice Izzard	Conservative
1990–1994	Robin Dixon	Labour
1990–1994	June van Roten	Labour
1990–2002; 2006–2014	Nirmal Gill	Labour
1994–1998	David Sterry	Labour
1994–1998	Dennis Bomberg	Labour
1998–2006	Madeleine Baker	Labour
1998–2006	Susan Bramley	Labour
2006–2010	Sukhninder Gill	Labour
2006–2010	Gerald Vincent	Labour
2010–present	Rocky Gill	Labour
2010–2026	Lynda Rice (Note: Lynda Rice changed parties in 2022 and 2025)	Labour
2010–2026	Lynda Rice	Independent
2010–2026	Lynda Rice	Conservative
2014–2018	Syed Ahammad	Labour
2018–present	Faruk Choudhury (Note: Faruk Choudhury changed parties in 2025)	Labour
2018–present	Faruk Choudhury	Green
2026–present	Mashkura Mazid	Green

== Summary ==
Councillors elected by party at each general borough election.

- Labour
- Conservative
- Green

== Barking and Dagenham council elections since 2022 ==
There was a revision of ward boundaries in Barking and Dagenham in 2022.

=== 2026 election ===
2026 Barking and Dagenham London Borough Council election: Longbridge
Party	Candidate	Votes	%	±%
Green	Faruk Choudhury	1,630	40.3	N/A
Labour	Rocky Gill	1,439	35.6	−34.8
Green	Mashkura Mazid	1,250	30.9	N/A
Labour	Emran Chowdhury	1,156	28.6	N/A
Green	Tim Hunt	1,117	27.6	N/A
Labour	Val Masson	936	23.1	N/A
Independent	Mohammed Hussain	895	22.1	N/A
Conservative	Shah Rahman	849	21.0	−16.4
Reform	Marin Adam	449	11.1	N/A
Reform	Chris Fennessy	416	10.3	N/A
Conservative	Lynda Jane Rice^	408	10.1	N/A
Reform	Alexandru Suciu	359	8.9	N/A
Conservative	Joe McNicholl	355	8.8	N/A
Liberal Democrats	Ghulam Rasool	101	2.5	N/A
Turnout		4,046	43.6	+9.2
Registered electors		9,271		
Green gain from Labour		Swing		
Labour hold		Swing		
Green gain from Labour		Swing		

=== 2022 election ===
The election took place on 5 May 2022.

2022 Barking and Dagenham London Borough Council election: Longbridge (3)
Party	Candidate	Votes	%	±%
Labour	Rocky Gill	2,164	29.0	+0.7
Labour	Faruk Choudhury	2,038	27.3	+0.4
Labour	Lynda Rice	1,746	23.4	−1.1
Conservative	Shah Rahman	1,150	15.4	N/A
Liberal Democrats	Zygimantas Adomavicius	373	5.0	N/A
Turnout		3,076	34.4	−6.2
Registered electors		8,922		
Labour hold		Swing		
Labour hold		Swing		
Labour hold		Swing		

== 2002–2022 Barking and Dagenham council elections ==
There was a revision of ward boundaries in Barking and Dagenham in 2002.

=== 2018 election ===
The election took place on 3 May 2018.

2018 Barking and Dagenham London Borough Council election: Longbridge (3)
Party	Candidate	Votes	%	±%
Labour	Rocky Gill	2,724	28.3	+4.3
Labour	Faruk Choudhury	2,582	26.9	N/A
Labour	Lynda Rice	2,356	24.5	+6.1
Conservative	Andrew Boff	711	7.4	N/A
Conservative	Tilly Wijesuriya	633	6.6	N/A
Conservative	Tamkeen Shaikh	607	6.3	N/A
Turnout		3,549	40.6	−3.1
Registered electors		8,736		
Labour hold		Swing		
Labour hold		Swing		
Labour hold		Swing		

=== 2014 election ===
The election took place on 22 May 2014.

2014 Barking and Dagenham London Borough Council election: Longbridge (3)
Party	Candidate	Votes	%	±%
Labour	Rocky Gill	2,288	24.1	N/A
Labour	Syed Ahammad	1,998	21.0	N/A
Labour	Lynda Rice	1,752	18.4	N/A
Conservative	Dr. Shahidur Rahman	856	9.0	N/A
UKIP	Rumana Tahir	623	6.6	N/A
Conservative	Glyn Lewis	485	5.1	N/A
Conservative	Richard Semitego	401	4.2	N/A
Green	Lorna Tooley	283	3.0	N/A
Liberal Democrats	Mohammod Uddin	275	2.9	N/A
Socialist Labour	Gerald Vincent	272	2.9	N/A
Independent	Shaheryaar Baig	270	2.8	N/A
Turnout		3,621	43.7	−25.4
Registered electors		8,287		
Labour hold		Swing		
Labour hold		Swing		
Labour hold		Swing		

=== 2010 election ===
The election on 6 May 2010 took place on the same day as the United Kingdom general election.

2010 Barking and Dagenham London Borough Council election: Longbridge (3)
Party	Candidate	Votes	%	±%
Labour	Rocky Gill	3,292	45.3	+19.1
Labour	Nirmal Gill	2,900		
Labour	Lynda Rice	2,559		
Liberal Democrats	Mohammod Jalal Uddin	1,239	17.1	N/A
Conservative	Paul Ayer	1,221	16.8	−8.4
Conservative	Foyzur Rahman	1,109		
BNP	Bede Ewing Smith	677	9.3	N/A
Independent	Edward Leigh Gosling	452	6.2	−15.9
Independent	Eileen Mary Gosling	388		
UKIP	John Walter Dias-Broughton	383	5.3	−9.1
Independent	Tony Richards	369		
Conservative	Komel Bajwe	316		
Independent	Julie Munroe	167		
Turnout		5,493	69.1	+20.6
Registered electors		7,950		
Labour hold		Swing		
Labour hold		Swing		
Labour hold		Swing		

=== 2006 election ===
The election took place on 4 May 2006.

2006 Barking and Dagenham London Borough Council election: Longbridge (3)
Party	Candidate	Votes	%	±%
Labour	Sukhninder Gill	1,272	26.2	−16.0
Labour	Nirmal Gill	1,253		
Labour	Gerald Vincent	1,233		
Conservative	Brian Cook	1,227	25.2	−14.2
Conservative	Margaret Cook	1,111		
Independent	Anthony Richards	1,072	22.1	N/A
Conservative	Anthony Chytry	910		
UKIP	James Burchill	701	14.4	N/A
Green	Laurence Cleeland	588	12.1	N/A
Turnout		3,661	48.5	+18.9
Registered electors		7,543		
Labour hold		Swing		
Labour hold		Swing		
Labour gain from Conservative		Swing		

=== 2002 election ===
The election took place on 2 May 2002.

2002 Barking and Dagenham London Borough Council election: Longbridge (3)
Party	Candidate	Votes	%	±%
Labour	Susan Bramley	869	42.2	−15.5
Labour	Madeleine Baker	852		
Conservative	Brian Cook	811	39.4	N/A
Labour	Nirmal Gill	774		
Conservative	Anton Clark	757		
Conservative	Paul Cocklind	741		
Liberal Democrats	Lea Harding	379	18.4	−23.9
Liberal Democrats	Hazel Price	352		
Liberal Democrats	Shirley Felton	334		
Turnout		2,115	29.6	−0.6
Registered electors		7,153		
Labour win (new boundaries)				
Labour win (new boundaries)				
Conservative win (new boundaries)				

== 1978–2002 Barking and Dagenham council elections ==
There was a revision of ward boundaries in Barking in 1978. The name of the borough and council changed from Barking to Barking and Dagenham on 1 January 1980.

=== 1998 election ===
The election took place on 7 May 1998.

1998 Barking and Dagenham London Borough Council election: Longbridge (3)
Party	Candidate	Votes	%	±%
Labour	Madeleine Baker	1,074	57.7	+8.7
Labour	Susan Bramley	1,069		
Labour	Nirmal Gill	870		
Liberal Democrats	Alan Cooper	786	42.3	−16.8
Liberal Democrats	Jayne Cooper	778		
Liberal Democrats	Edith Downs	713		
Turnout		2,023	30.2	−15.1
Registered electors		6,707		
Labour hold		Swing		
Labour hold		Swing		
Labour hold		Swing		

=== 1994 election ===
The election took place on 5 May 1994.

1994 Barking and Dagenham London Borough Council election: Longbridge (3)
Party	Candidate	Votes	%	±%
Labour	David J. Sterry	1,442	49.0	+5.7
Labour	Dennis W. Bomberg	1,376		
Labour	Nirmal S. S. Gill	1,325		
Liberal Democrats	Brian B. Beadle	752	25.5	+17.3
Conservative	Brian Cook	750	25.5	−13.6
Conservative	Peter M. Burch	741		
Conservative	Valerie Burch	712		
Liberal Democrats	Daniel J. Felton	613		
Liberal Democrats	Nigel L. Meyer	583		
Turnout		3,031	45.3	−1.5
Registered electors		6,688		
Labour hold		Swing		
Labour hold		Swing		
Labour hold		Swing		

=== 1990 election ===
The election took place on 3 May 1990.

1990 Barking and Dagenham London Borough Council election: Longbridge (3)
Party	Candidate	Votes	%	±%
Labour	Robin C. Dixon	1,398	43.3	+14.3
Labour	June M. van Roten	1,318		
Labour	Nirmal S. S. Gill	1,290		
Conservative	Brian Cook	1,264	39.1	+2.0
Conservative	Janice E. Izzard	1,228		
Conservative	John W. Seaman	1,184		
Lib Dem Focus Team	Brian B. Beadle	304	9.4	−24.4
Liberal Democrats	Jayne E. Cooper	264	8.2	N/A
Lib Dem Focus Team	Richard J. Felton	246		
Turnout		3,038	43.8	+1.1
Registered electors		6,935		
Labour gain from Conservative		Swing		
Labour gain from Conservative		Swing		
Labour gain from Conservative		Swing		

=== 1986 election ===
The election took place on 8 May 1986.

1986 Barking and Dagenham London Borough Council election: Longbridge (3)
Party	Candidate	Votes	%	±%
Conservative	Brian Cook	1,087	37.1	−16.8
Conservative	Janice E. Izzard	1,058		
Conservative	John W. Seaman	1,038		
Lib Dem Focus Team	Daniel J. Felton	989	33.8	+9.1
Lib Dem Focus Team	Susan P. Vickers	968		
Lib Dem Focus Team	Shirley Felton	962		
Labour	Frederick Jones	850	29.0	+7.5
Labour	Maureen E. Fitz-Henry	814		
Labour	Robin C Dixon	805		
Turnout			42.7	+1.2
Registered electors		7,158		
Conservative hold		Swing		
Conservative hold		Swing		
Conservative hold		Swing		

=== 1983 by-election ===
The by-election was held on 9 June 1983, following the resignation of Edward Reed.

1983 Longbridge by-election
Party	Candidate	Votes	%	±%
Conservative	Constance Foster	2,372	50.4	−3.5
Liberal	Daniel Felton	1,346	28.6	+3.9
Labour	James Jones	984	20.9	−0.6
Majority		1,026	21.8	N/A
Turnout			64.8	+23.3
Registered electors		7,275		
Conservative hold		Swing		

=== 1982 election ===
The election took place on 6 May 1982.

1982 Barking and Dagenham London Borough Council election: Longbridge (3)
Party	Candidate	Votes	%	±%
Conservative	Brian Cook	1,556	53.9	−5.7
Conservative	Edward J. Reed	1,530		
Conservative	John W. Seaman	1,503		
Alliance	Brian B. Beadle	713	24.7	+16.5
Alliance	Angela E. Bush	680		
Alliance	David C. Smith	645		
Labour	John Cavanagh	620	21.5	−11.2
Labour	Marie A. Cole	588		
Labour	John E. Luff	571		
Turnout			41.5	+3.7
Registered electors		7,304		
Conservative hold		Swing		
Conservative hold		Swing		
Conservative hold		Swing		

=== 1978 election ===
The election took place on 4 May 1978.

1978 Barking London Borough Council election: Longbridge (3)
Party	Candidate	Votes	%	±%
Conservative	Dennis W. Barnett	1,846	59.6	+27.8
Conservative	Edward J. Reed	1,780		N/A
Conservative	John W. Seaman	1,724		N/A
Labour	Doris M. Jones	998	32.7	−16.5
Labour	John Cavanagh	997		N/A
Labour	Marie A. Cole	915		N/A
Liberal	Brian B. Beadle	254	8.2	−10.7
Liberal	Eric J. Lowers	218		N/A
Liberal	Dennis J. Keenan	217		N/A
Turnout			45.2	+16.1
Registered electors		7,324		
Conservative win (new boundaries)				
Conservative win (new boundaries)				
Conservative win (new boundaries)				

== 1964–1978 Barking council elections ==
=== 1974 election ===
The election took place on 2 May 1974.

1974 Barking London Borough Council election: Longbridge (4)
Party	Candidate	Votes	%	±%
Labour	J. Cavanagh	1,649	49.2	−12.5
Labour	M. Cole	1,560		N/A
Labour	M. O'Shea	1,463		N/A
Labour	M Ness	1,361		N/A
Conservative	C.. Pool	1,067	31.8	−6.5
Conservative	V. Pool	998		N/A
Conservative	D. Barnett	958		N/A
Conservative	E. Reed	947		N/A
Liberal	G. Vernon	635	18.9	N/A
Liberal	R. Keenan	615		N/A
Liberal	D. Felton	611		N/A
Liberal	J. James	609		N/A
Turnout			29.1	−3.1
Registered electors		10,724		
Labour hold		Swing		
Labour hold		Swing		
Labour hold		Swing		
Labour hold		Swing		

=== 1971 election ===
The election took place on 13 May 1971.

1971 Barking London Borough Council election: Longbridge (4)
Party	Candidate	Votes	%	±%
Labour	R. Godfrey	2,233	61.7	+25.8
Labour	M. Ness	2,229		N/A
Labour	M. O'Shea	2,203		N/A
Labour	M. Spencer	2,193		N/A
Conservative	A. Gray	1,386	38.3	−25.8
Conservative	V. Pool	1,382		N/A
Conservative	C. Pool	1,356		N/A
Conservative	D. Barnett	1,309		N/A
Turnout			32.2	−1.4
Registered electors		11,091		
Labour gain from Conservative		Swing		
Labour gain from Conservative		Swing		
Labour gain from Conservative		Swing		
Labour gain from Conservative		Swing		

=== 1968 election ===
The election took place on 9 May 1968.

1968 Barking London Borough Council election: Longbridge (4)
Party	Candidate	Votes	%	±%
Conservative	V. Pool	2,341	64.1	+19.2
Conservative	C. Pool	2,307		N/A
Conservative	J. Dean	2,161		N/A
Conservative	D. Barnett	2,088		N/A
Labour	F. Butler	1,313	35.9	−19.2
Labour	L. Senior	1,284		N/A
Labour	E. Mansell	1,254		N/A
Labour	R. Godfrey	1,248		N/A
Turnout			33.6	−5.1
Registered electors		10,671		
Conservative gain from Labour		Swing		
Conservative gain from Labour		Swing		
Conservative gain from Labour		Swing		
Conservative gain from Labour		Swing		

=== 1964 election ===
The election took place on 7 May 1964.

1964 Barking London Borough Council election: Longbridge (4)
Party	Candidate	Votes	%	±%
Labour	E. McKee	2,280	55.1	N/A
Labour	J. B. Ward	2,265		N/A
Labour	L. Senior	2,240		N/A
Labour	F. Edgecombe	2,222		N/A
Conservative	H. Hills	1,861	44.9	N/A
Conservative	F. Westbrook	1,845		N/A
Conservative	J. G. F. Willmott	1,837		N/A
Conservative	C. A. Pool	1,830		N/A
Turnout		4,229	38.7	N/A
Registered electors		10,920		
Labour win (new seat)				
Labour win (new seat)				
Labour win (new seat)				
Labour win (new seat)				
