= Alibon (ward) =

Electoral ward in the London Borough of Barking and Dagenham

Coordinates: 51.5446°N 0.152°E

- Electoral ward for the Barking and Dagenham London Borough Council
- Alibon ward boundaries since 2022
- Borough: Barking and Dagenham
- County: Greater London
- Population: 10,029 (2021) (Note: 2021 Census data reported for 2022 ward boundaries)
- Electorate: 6,524 (2022)
- Major settlements: Becontree, Dagenham
- Area: 1.383 square kilometres (0.534 sq mi)

Current electoral ward
- Created: 1978
- Number of members: 1978–2002: 2; 2002–2022: 3; 2022–present: 2
- Councillors: Dorothy Akwaboah; Muazzam Sandhu
- GSS code: E05000027 (2002–2022); E05014054 (2022–present)
- Name origin: Richard Alibon

Alibon is an electoral ward in the London Borough of Barking and Dagenham. The ward was first used in the 1978 elections. It returns councillors to Barking and Dagenham London Borough Council. The boundaries of the ward were subject to revision in May 2002 and May 2022.

== Barking and Dagenham council elections since 2022 ==
There was a revision of ward boundaries in Barking and Dagenham in 2022. Territory to the west of Heathway was lost to Parsloes ward and an area east of Pondfield Park, including the London East Business and Technical Park, was gained in the east from Eastbrook. The number of councillors representing the ward was reduced from three to two.

=== 2026 election ===
The election took place on 7 May 2026.

2026 Barking and Dagenham London Borough Council election: Alibon
Party	Candidate	Votes	%	±%
Labour	Dorothy Akwaboah	981	42.86	
Labour	Muazzam Sandhu	894	39.06	
Reform	Tracey Sullivan-Sparks	883	38.58	
Reform	Nick Vandyke	828	36.17	
Conservative	Ikem Chinedu	284	12.41	
Conservative	Abul Khayer	267	11.66	
Liberal Democrats	Brianne Wooding	219	9.58	
Turnout		2,289	32.23	
Labour hold		Swing		
Labour hold		Swing		

=== 2022 election ===
The election took place on 5 May 2022.

2022 Barking and Dagenham London Borough Council election: Alibon
Party	Candidate	Votes	%	±%
Labour	John Dulwich	1,060	44.0	N/A
Labour	Dorothy Akwaboah	932	38.7	N/A
Conservative	Arjun Jaiya	415	17.2	N/A
Turnout		1,499	22.7	N/A
Registered electors		6,524		
Labour win (new boundaries)				
Labour win (new boundaries)				

== 2002–2022 Barking and Dagenham council elections ==
Alibon ward boundaries from 2002 to 2022

There was a revision of ward boundaries in Barking and Dagenham in 2002. A large area was gained to the west of Heathway. The number of councillors representing the ward was increased from two to three.

=== 2018 election ===
The election took place on 3 May 2018.

2018 Barking and Dagenham London Borough Council election: Alibon
Party	Candidate	Votes	%	±%
Labour	John Dulwich	1,350	26.1	N/A
Labour	Paul Robinson	1,306	25.2	N/A
Labour	Sanchia Alasia	1,281	24.7	+3.0
Conservative	Keith Syers	480	9.3	N/A
Conservative	Tariq Saeed	386	7.4	N/A
Conservative	Roma Tahir	377	7.3	N/A
Turnout		1,896	25.6	−8.6
Registered electors		7,397		
Labour hold		Swing		
Labour hold		Swing		
Labour hold		Swing		

=== 2014 election ===
The election took place on 22 May 2014.

2014 Barking and Dagenham London Borough Council election: Alibon
Party	Candidate	Votes	%	±%
Labour	Darren Rodwell	1,398	24.6	N/A
Labour	Christopher Hughes	1,389	24.4	N/A
Labour	Sanchia Alasia	1,240	21.8	N/A
UKIP	Norman Wood	974	12.1	N/A
Conservative	Jakir Hussain	221	3.9	N/A
Conservative	Md. Neamat Ullah	180	3.4	N/A
Conservative	Mohammed Zaman	145	2.5	N/A
Liberal Democrats	Terence London	143	2.5	N/A
Turnout		2,471	34.3	−24.9
Registered electors		7,210		
Labour hold		Swing		
Labour hold		Swing		
Labour hold		Swing		

=== 2010 election ===
The election on 6 May 2010 took place on the same day as the United Kingdom general election.

2010 Barking and Dagenham London Borough Council election: Alibon
Party	Candidate	Votes	%	±%
Labour	Darren Rodwell	2,245	48.1	+13.5
Labour	John Davis	2,135		
Labour	Sanchia Alasia	1,995		
BNP	Robert William Bailey	1,209	25.9	−15.8
BNP	Gavin Cardy	1,111		
BNP	Giuseppe Di Santis	977		
Conservative	Vivian Patten	687	14.7	+2.4
Liberal Democrats	Richard David Ryder	529	11.3	N/A
Turnout		4,127	59.0	+17.9
Registered electors		6,971		
Labour gain from BNP		Swing		
Labour gain from BNP		Swing		
Labour hold		Swing		

=== 2006 election ===
The election took place on 4 May 2006.

2006 Barking and Dagenham London Borough Council election: Alibon
Party	Candidate	Votes	%	±%
BNP	William Bailey	1,329	41.7	N/A
BNP	Claire Doncaster	1,323		
Labour	John Davis	1,071	33.6	−33.8
Labour	Terry Wade	1,018		
Labour	Dave Miles	957		
UKIP	Margaret Whitson	394	12.4	N/A
Conservative	Lucy East	393	12.3	−20.3
Turnout		2,759	41.1	+22.0
Registered electors		6,721		
BNP gain from Labour		Swing		
BNP gain from Labour		Swing		
Labour hold		Swing		

=== 2002 election ===
The election took place on 2 May 2002.

2002 Barking and Dagenham London Borough Council election: Alibon
Party	Candidate	Votes	%	±%
Labour	Terry Wade	743	67.4	−5.3
Labour	John Davis	724		
Labour	Mick McCarthy	632		
Conservative	Mary Justice	360	32.6	+19.4
Turnout		1,264	19.1	−5.4
Registered electors		6,631		
Labour win (new boundaries)				
Labour win (new boundaries)				
Labour win (new boundaries)				

== 1978–2002 Barking and Dagenham council elections ==
Alibon ward boundaries from 1978 to 2002

The name of the borough and council changed from Barking to Barking and Dagenham on 1 January 1980.

=== 1998 election ===
The election took place on 7 May 1998.

1998 Barking and Dagenham London Borough Council election: Alibon
Party	Candidate	Votes	%	±%
Labour	Terence Wade	727	72.7	−11.7
Labour	Ernest White	678		
Liberal Democrats	Catherine Kelly	141	14.1	−1.5
Conservative	Malcolm Beatty	132	13.2	N/A
Turnout		996	24.5	−12.4
Registered electors		4,135		
Labour hold		Swing		
Labour hold		Swing		

=== 1994 election ===
The election took place on 5 May 1994.

1994 Barking and Dagenham London Borough Council election: Alibon
Party	Candidate	Votes	%	±%
Labour	Terence Wade	1,208	84.4	+5.3
Labour	Ernest White	1,189		
Liberal Democrats	Joan Cooper	224	15.6	+7.8
Liberal Democrats	Linda Luby	203		
Turnout		1,569	36.9	−0.6
Registered electors		4,252		
Labour hold		Swing		
Labour hold		Swing		

=== 1990 election ===
The election took place on 3 May 1990.

1990 Barking and Dagenham London Borough Council election: Alibon
Party	Candidate	Votes	%	±%
Labour	Ernest White	1,283	79.3	+7.4
Labour	Trevor Watson	1,259		
Conservative	Leonard Pullen	211	12.7	+0.6
Conservative	Lillian Pullen	197		
Liberal Democrats	John Kelly	127	7.9	−4.2
Rejected ballots		3	0.2	
Turnout		1,697	37.5	+5.6
Registered electors		4,526		
Labour hold		Swing		
Labour hold		Swing		

=== 1986 election ===
The election took place on 8 May 1986.

1986 Barking and Dagenham London Borough Council election: Alibon
Party	Candidate	Votes	%	±%
Labour	David Cooper	1,061	71.9	+19.7
Labour	Ernest White	1,013		
Alliance	John Carter	236	16.0	−13.8
Conservative	Doris Taylor	179	12.1	−5.9
Conservative	John Taylor	177		
Turnout			31.9	−0.3
Registered electors		4,714		
Labour hold		Swing		
Labour hold		Swing		

=== 1982 election ===
The election took place on 6 May 1982.

1982 Barking and Dagenham London Borough Council election: Alibon
Party	Candidate	Votes	%	±%
Labour	Thomas Reynolds	779	52.2	−17.8
Labour	Ernest White	733		
Alliance	Edward Blake	444	29.8	N/A
Alliance	David Kingsby	410		
Conservative	Reginald Johnson	268	18.0	−9.1
Conservative	William Johnson	211		
Turnout			32.2	+3.7
Registered electors		4,761		
Labour hold		Swing		
Labour hold		Swing		

=== 1978 election ===
The election took place on 4 May 1978.

1978 Barking London Borough Council election: Alibon
Party	Candidate	Votes	%	±%
Labour	Thomas Reynolds	945	70.0	N/A
Labour	Ernest White	944		N/A
Conservative	Reginald Johnson	366	27.1	N/A
Conservative	William Maule	324		N/A
Communist	Frederick Creamer	39	2.9	N/A
Turnout			28.5	N/A
Registered electors		4,817		
Labour win (new seat)				
Labour win (new seat)				
