= Marks Gate (ward) =

Coordinates: 51.538°N 0.079°E

- Former electoral ward for the Barking and Dagenham London Borough Council
- Borough: Barking and Dagenham
- County: Greater London
- Electorate: 2,441 (1978); 2,329 (1982); 2,178 (1986); 3,539 (1994); 3,580 (1998)

Former electoral ward
- Created: 1978
- Abolished: 2002
- Councillors: 1978–1994: 1; 1994–2002: 2
- Replaced by: Chadwell Heath

Marks Gate was an electoral ward in the London Borough of Barking and Dagenham from 1978 to 2002.

== List of councillors ==
Term	Councillor	Party
1978–1982	Arthur Biles	Labour
1982–1988	Donald Pepper	Independent
1988–2002	Maureen Worby	Labour
1994–1998	Peter Melia	Labour
1998–2001	Colin Pond	Labour
2001–2002	Michael McCarthy	Labour

== Summary ==
Councillors elected by party at each general borough election.

- Labour
- Independent

== 1994–2002 Barking and Dagenham council elections ==
The boundaries of the ward were adjusted on 1 April 1994. Marks Gate ward formed a salient of Barking and Dagenham surrounded by the boroughs of Havering and Redbridge. The adjustment transferred sufficient population from those boroughs to require an increase from one to two councillors representing the Marks Gate ward. The Padnall estate was united entirely within the ward.

=== 2001 by-election ===
The by-election was held on 27 September 2001, following the resignation of Colin Pond.

2001 Marks Gate by-election
Party	Candidate	Votes	%	±%
Labour	Michael McCarthy	443	56.6	+23.0
Conservative	Terence Justice	290	37.0	N/A
Liberal Democrats	Jonathan Lopez-Real	27	3.4	−17.0
Green	Geoffrey Hunwicks	23	2.9	N/A
Majority		153	19.6	N/A
Turnout			20.0	−5.0
Registered electors				
Labour hold		Swing		

=== 1998 election ===
The election took place on 7 May 1998.

1998 Barking and Dagenham London Borough Council election: Marks Gate
Party	Candidate	Votes	%	±%
Labour	Maureen Worby	651	79.6	+1.6
Labour	Colin Pond	524		
Liberal Democrats	Anthony Pace	167	20.4	−1.6
Turnout		896	25.0	−12.4
Registered electors		3,580		
Labour hold		Swing		
Labour hold		Swing		

=== 1994 election ===
The election took place on 5 May 1994.

1994 Barking and Dagenham London Borough Council election: Marks Gate
Party	Candidate	Votes	%	±%
Labour	Maureen Worby	921	78.0	−5.3
Labour	Peter Melia	845		
Liberal Democrats	Winifred Chapman	260	22.0	N/A
Liberal Democrats	Roger Miller	248		
Turnout		1,322	37.4	−7.4
Registered electors		3,539		
Labour win (new boundaries)				
Labour win (new boundaries)				

== 1978–1994 Barking and Dagenham council elections ==
Marks Gate ward boundaries from 1978 to 1994

The name of the borough and council changed from Barking to Barking and Dagenham on 1 January 1980.

=== 1990 election ===
The election took place on 3 May 1990.

1990 Barking and Dagenham London Borough Council election: Marks Gate
Party	Candidate	Votes	%	±%
Labour	Maureen Worby	785	83.33	
Conservative	Ernest Blackborow	157	16.67	
Registered electors		2,114		
Turnout		947	44.80	
Rejected ballots		4	0.4	
Labour hold		Swing		

=== 1988 by-election ===
The by-election was held on 10 March 1988, following the resignation of Donald Pepper.

1988 Marks Gate by-election
Party	Candidate	Votes	%	±%
Labour	Maureen Worby	477	64.0	+16.2
Conservative	Terence Malladine	268	36.0	+36.0
Majority		209	28.0	N/A
Turnout			35.5	−4.7
Registered electors		2,098		
Labour gain from Independent		Swing		

=== 1986 election ===
The election took place on 8 May 1986.

1986 Barking and Dagenham London Borough Council election: Marks Gate
Party	Candidate	Votes	%	±%
Independent	Donald Pepper	457	52.2	−11.9
Labour	Margaret West	418	47.8	+11.9
Turnout			40.2	+3.7
Registered electors		2,178		
Independent hold		Swing		

=== 1982 election ===
The election took place on 6 May 1982.

1982 Barking and Dagenham London Borough Council election: Marks Gate
Party	Candidate	Votes	%	±%
Independent	Donald Pepper	542	64.1	N/A
Labour	Alan Thomas	303	35.9	−22.8
Turnout			36.5	+4.3
Registered electors		2,329		
Independent gain from Labour		Swing		

=== 1978 election ===
The election took place on 4 May 1978.

1978 Barking London Borough Council election: Marks Gate
Party	Candidate	Votes	%	±%
Labour	Arthur Biles	458	58.7	N/A
Conservative	Michael O'Brien	300	38.5	N/A
Communist	Daniel Connor	22	2.8	N/A
Turnout			32.2	N/A
Registered electors		2,441		
Labour win (new seat)				
