= 1982 Barking and Dagenham London Borough Council election =

The 1982 Barking and Dagenham Borough Council election took place on 6 May 1982 to elect members of Barking and Dagenham London Borough Council in London, England. The whole council was up for election and the Labour Party stayed in overall control of the council.

== Background ==
124 candidates nominated in total. Labour again ran a full slate and was the only party to do so. By contrast the Conservative Party ran only 34 candidates and the SDP-Liberal Alliance 22.

== Election result ==
Labour continued to win a large majority of seats - 37 out of 48. The Conservatives and the Residents Association each held their three seats. The SDP–Liberal Alliance won three seats and two Independents were also elected. Thus the new council included four parties for the first time since its formation in 1964.

== Ward results ==
=== Abbey ===
Abbey (3)
| Party | Candidate | Votes | % | ±% |
|---|---|---|---|---|
| Labour | Jean Bruce | 1,210 | 52.2 | −1.5 |
| Labour | Horace Howie | 1,199 | | |
| Labour | Graham Bramley | 1,109 | | |
| Alliance | Frederick Edgecombe | 563 | 24.3 | +9.9 |
| Alliance | Terence Power | 548 | | |
| Conservative | Malcolm Maugey | 545 | 23.5 | +4.8 |
| Conservative | Frederick Tisdell | 541 | | |
| Conservative | Olive Tisdell | 482 | | |
| Turnout | | | 39.5 | −2.1 |
| Registered electors | | 6,535 | | |
| Labour hold | | Swing | | |
| Labour hold | | Swing | | |
| Labour hold | | Swing | | |

=== Alibon ===
Alibon (2)
| Party | Candidate | Votes | % | ±% |
|---|---|---|---|---|
| Labour | Thomas Reynolds | 779 | 52.2 | −17.8 |
| Labour | Ernest White | 733 | | |
| Alliance | Edward Blake | 444 | 29.8 | N/A |
| Alliance | David Kingsby | 410 | | |
| Conservative | Reginald Johnson | 268 | 18.0 | −9.1 |
| Conservative | William Johnson | 211 | | |
| Turnout | | | 32.2 | +3.7 |
| Registered electors | | 4,761 | | |
| Labour hold | | Swing | | |
| Labour hold | | Swing | | |

=== Cambell ===
Cambell (3)
| Party | Candidate | Votes | % | ±% |
|---|---|---|---|---|
| Labour | Joseph Butler | 1,365 | 68.4 | +5.0 |
| Labour | Sidney Cole | 1,220 | | |
| Labour | Marjorie Creasey | 1,179 | | |
| Conservative | Ronald Smith | 630 | 31.6 | +9.5 |
| Conservative | Stella Seaman | 604 | | |
| Conservative | Phyllis Turner | 544 | | |
| Turnout | | | 31.9 | +0.0 |
| Registered electors | | 7,135 | | |
| Labour hold | | Swing | | |
| Labour hold | | Swing | | |
| Labour hold | | Swing | | |

=== Chadwell Heath ===
Chadwell Heath (3)
| Party | Candidate | Votes | % | ±% |
|---|---|---|---|---|
| Residents | Raymond Gowland | 2,024 | 80.3 | +4.2 |
| Residents | Robert Jeyes | 2,012 | | |
| Residents | William Hibble | 1,972 | | |
| Labour | William Summers | 440 | 17.5 | −4.7 |
| Labour | Morris Ness | 411 | | |
| Labour | Joanne Williams | 384 | | |
| Communist | Alfred Ott | 57 | 2.3 | +0.6 |
| Turnout | | | 38.7 | −1.4 |
| Registered electors | | 6,888 | | |
| Residents hold | | Swing | | |
| Residents hold | | Swing | | |
| Residents hold | | Swing | | |

=== Eastbrook ===
Eastbrook (3)
| Party | Candidate | Votes | % | ±% |
|---|---|---|---|---|
| Labour | Frederick Tibble | 895 | 40.4 | −7.8 |
| Labour | Lawrence Bunn | 845 | | |
| Labour | Alan Stevens | 815 | | |
| Conservative | Norman Houlder | 782 | 35.3 | −8.8 |
| Conservative | Sydney Horrell | 767 | | |
| Conservative | Ada Horrell | 758 | | |
| Alliance | George Keegan | 539 | 24.3 | +16.6 |
| Alliance | Edward Bullock | 530 | | |
| Alliance | Joan Keegan | 528 | | |
| Turnout | | | 33.8 | −3.3 |
| Registered electors | | 7,174 | | |
| Labour hold | | Swing | | |
| Labour hold | | Swing | | |
| Labour hold | | Swing | | |

=== Eastbury ===
Eastbury (2)
| Party | Candidate | Votes | % | ±% |
|---|---|---|---|---|
| Labour | Maud Ball | 832 | 50.0 | −18.5 |
| Labour | Michael O'Shea | 774 | | |
| Conservative | Stanley Bray | 441 | 26.5 | N/A |
| Conservative | Richard Hall | 411 | | |
| Alliance | Sylvia Jones | 392 | 23.5 | −8.0 |
| Alliance | Kevin Power | 353 | | |
| Turnout | | | 37.9 | +2.4 |
| Registered electors | | 4,884 | | |
| Labour hold | | Swing | | |
| Labour hold | | Swing | | |

=== Fanshawe ===
Fanshawe (3)
| Party | Candidate | Votes | % | ±% |
|---|---|---|---|---|
| Labour | Frederick Jones | 1,272 | 90.8 | +18.4 |
| Labour | John Thomas | 1,053 | | |
| Labour | Ernest Turner | 1,042 | | |
| Communist | Keith Bird | 129 | 9.2 | +5.8 |
| Turnout | | | 24.3 | −5.9 |
| Registered electors | | 6,926 | | |
| Labour hold | | Swing | | |
| Labour hold | | Swing | | |
| Labour hold | | Swing | | |

=== Gascoigne ===
Gascoigne (3)
| Party | Candidate | Votes | % | ±% |
|---|---|---|---|---|
| Alliance | Alan Beadle | 1,413 | 54.0 | +43.0 |
| Alliance | Ronwen Beadle | 1,363 | | |
| Alliance | David Spender | 1,194 | | |
| Labour | Terence Bird | 926 | 35.4 | +0.7 |
| Labour | Brian Walker | 881 | | |
| Labour | James Jones | 857 | | |
| Conservative | Maureen Hall | 259 | 9.9 | −9.0 |
| Conservative | Frederick Westbrook | 238 | | |
| Conservative | Bernadette Long | 235 | | |
| Workers Revolutionary | Keith Scotcher | 20 | 0.8 | N/A |
| Turnout | | | 42.4 | +7.7 |
| Registered electors | | 6,635 | | |
| Alliance gain from Labour | | Swing | | |
| Alliance gain from Labour | | Swing | | |
| Alliance gain from Labour | | Swing | | |

=== Goresbrook ===
Goresbrook (2)
| Party | Candidate | Votes | % | ±% |
|---|---|---|---|---|
| Labour | David Dodd | 856 | 64.2 | −2.2 |
| Labour | Edith Bradley | 852 | | |
| Conservative | Frank Allen | 417 | 31.3 | −2.6 |
| Conservative | John Dutton | 367 | | |
| National Front | Ronald Ferrett | 60 | 4.5 | N/A |
| National Front | Stephen Woodward | 57 | | |
| Turnout | | | 28.2 | +2.4 |
| Registered electors | | 5,099 | | |
| Labour hold | | Swing | | |
| Labour hold | | Swing | | |

=== Heath ===
Heath (3)
| Party | Candidate | Votes | % | ±% |
|---|---|---|---|---|
| Labour | Charles Fairbrass | 1,244 | 59.7 | −5.1 |
| Labour | John Lawrence | 1,191 | | |
| Labour | John Allam | 1,186 | | |
| Conservative | John Taylor | 781 | 37.5 | +8.1 |
| Conservative | Joan Preston | 778 | | |
| Conservative | William Preston | 776 | | |
| Communist | Helena Ott | 58 | 2.8 | −3.0 |
| Turnout | | | 33.0 | +2.6 |
| Registered electors | | 7,545 | | |
| Labour hold | | Swing | | |
| Labour hold | | Swing | | |
| Labour hold | | Swing | | |

=== Longbridge ===
Longbridge (3)
| Party | Candidate | Votes | % | ±% |
|---|---|---|---|---|
| Conservative | Brian Cook | 1,556 | 53.9 | −5.7 |
| Conservative | Edward Reed | 1,530 | | |
| Conservative | John Seaman | 1,503 | | |
| Alliance | Brian Beadle | 713 | 24.7 | +16.5 |
| Alliance | Angela Bush | 680 | | |
| Alliance | David Smith | 645 | | |
| Labour | John Cavanagh | 620 | 21.5 | −11.2 |
| Labour | Marie Cole | 588 | | |
| Labour | John Luff | 571 | | |
| Turnout | | | 41.5 | +3.7 |
| Registered electors | | 7,304 | | |
| Labour hold | | Swing | | |
| Labour hold | | Swing | | |
| Labour hold | | Swing | | |

=== Manor ===
Manor (2)
| Party | Candidate | Votes | % | ±% |
|---|---|---|---|---|
| Labour | Albert Ball | 1,106 | 67.2 | +3.4 |
| Labour | James Mannering | 959 | | |
| Conservative | Donald Gowler | 428 | 28.3 | +1.9 |
| Conservative | Leonard Nelson | 368 | | |
| National Front | Paul Griffiths | 69 | 4.6 | N/A |
| National Front | Graham Pearce | 65 | | |
| Turnout | | | 33.3 | +0.8 |
| Registered electors | | 4,917 | | |
| Labour hold | | Swing | | |
| Labour hold | | Swing | | |

=== Marks Gate ===
Marks Gate (1)
| Party | Candidate | Votes | % | ±% |
|---|---|---|---|---|
| Independent | Donald Pepper | 542 | 64.1 | N/A |
| Labour | Alan Thomas | 303 | 35.9 | −22.8 |
| Turnout | | | 36.5 | +4.3 |
| Registered electors | | 2,329 | | |
| Independent gain from Labour | | Swing | | |

=== Parsloes ===
Parsloes (2)
| Party | Candidate | Votes | % | ±% |
|---|---|---|---|---|
| Labour | Mabel Arnold | 820 | 48.3 | −12.8 |
| Labour | John Dias-Broughton | 780 | | |
| Conservative | Terence Arthur | 512 | 30.1 | −2.9 |
| Conservative | Frederick Maloney | 455 | | |
| Alliance | Daniel Felton | 367 | 21.6 | +9.9 |
| Alliance | Christopher Vecchi | 300 | | |
| Turnout | | | 34.7 | +2.2 |
| Registered electors | | 5,255 | | |
| Labour hold | | Swing | | |
| Labour hold | | Swing | | |

=== River ===
River (2)
| Party | Candidate | Votes | % | ±% |
|---|---|---|---|---|
| Labour | John Wainwright | 741 | 42.1 | −24.9 |
| Independent | Patricia Twomey | 689 | 39.2 | N/A |
| Independent | John Howard | 636 | | |
| Labour | Inder Jamu | 569 | | |
| Conservative | Mary Hawkins | 329 | 18.7 | −10.3 |
| Turnout | | | 33.2 | +3.4 |
| Registered electors | | 5,164 | | |
| Labour hold | | Swing | | |
| Independent gain from Labour | | Swing | | |

=== Thames ===
Thames (2)
| Party | Candidate | Votes | % | ±% |
|---|---|---|---|---|
| Labour | George Shaw | 1,273 | 61.4 | −24.7 |
| Labour | Royston Patient | 1,171 | | |
| Alliance | Martin Taylor | 419 | 20.2 | +8.3 |
| Alliance | Dennis Keenan | 417 | | |
| Conservative | Marion Nelson | 382 | 18.4 | N/A |
| Conservative | Dorothea Reed | 365 | | |
| Turnout | | | 43.7 | +5.2 |
| Registered electors | | 4,898 | | |
| Labour hold | | Swing | | |
| Labour hold | | Swing | | |

=== Triptons ===
Triptons (3)
| Party | Candidate | Votes | % | ±% |
|---|---|---|---|---|
| Labour | George Brooker | 1,032 | 62.5 | −3.4 |
| Labour | John Davis | 963 | | |
| Labour | Leonard Collins | 921 | | |
| Alliance | John Bell | 559 | 33.9 | N/A |
| Alliance | Sylvia Hayward | 498 | | |
| Alliance | Paul Hitchings | 486 | | |
| Communist | Jean Burke | 60 | 3.6 | −2.0 |
| Turnout | | | 26.0 | −1.5 |
| Registered electors | | 7,184 | | |
| Labour hold | | Swing | | |
| Labour hold | | Swing | | |
| Labour hold | | Swing | | |

=== Valence ===
Valence (3)
| Party | Candidate | Votes | % | ±% |
|---|---|---|---|---|
| Labour | Richard Blackburn | 1,215 | 90.6 | +29.8 |
| Labour | Matthew Eales | 1,164 | | |
| Labour | Joan Foster | 1,100 | | |
| Communist | Danny Marshall | 126 | 9.4 | +6.7 |
| Turnout | | | 23.6 | −7.1 |
| Registered electors | | 7,186 | | |
| Labour hold | | Swing | | |
| Labour hold | | Swing | | |
| Labour hold | | Swing | | |

=== Village ===
Village (3)
| Party | Candidate | Votes | % | ±% |
|---|---|---|---|---|
| Labour | Peter Bradley | 946 | 42.2 | −6.1 |
| Labour | Harry Tindell | 918 | | |
| Labour | Ronald Whitbread | 891 | | |
| Conservative | Terence Mallindine | 695 | 31.0 | −1.8 |
| Conservative | Vera Ellis | 667 | | |
| Conservative | James Harding | 657 | | |
| Independent | George Monk | 540 | 24.1 | N/A |
| Independent | Michael Timothy | 523 | | |
| Independent | Stanley Simmons | 521 | | |
| Communist | Daniel Connor | 59 | 2.6 | −1.2 |
| Turnout | | | 31.2 | −0.8 |
| Registered electors | | 7,815 | | |
| Labour hold | | Swing | | |
| Labour hold | | Swing | | |
| Labour hold | | Swing | | |

== By-elections between 1982 and 1986 ==
=== Manor ===
Manor by-election, 15 July 1982
| Party | Candidate | Votes | % | ±% |
|---|---|---|---|---|
| Labour | Brian Walker | 625 | 60.6 | −6.6 |
| Conservative | Leonard Nelson | 205 | 19.9 | −8.4 |
| Alliance | David Kingaby | 202 | 19.6 | +19.6 |
| Majority | | 420 | 40.7 | N/A |
| Turnout | | | 21.1 | −12.2 |
| Registered electors | | 4,930 | | |
| Labour hold | | Swing | | |

The by-election was called following the death of Cllr. Albert Ball.

=== Chadwell Heath ===
Chadwell Heath by-election, 5 May 1983
| Party | Candidate | Votes | % | ±% |
|---|---|---|---|---|
| Residents | Albert Gibbs | 1,184 | 50.8 | −29.5 |
| Conservative | Norman Houlder | 490 | 21.0 | +21.0 |
| Labour | William Summers | 390 | 16.7 | −0.8 |
| Alliance | David Kingaby | 266 | 11.4 | +11.4 |
| Majority | | 694 | 29.8 | N/A |
| Turnout | | | 34.1 | −4.6 |
| Registered electors | | 6,866 | | |
| Residents hold | | Swing | | |

The by-election was called following the resignation of Cllr. William Hibble.

=== Longbridge ===
Longbridge by-election, 9 June 1983
| Party | Candidate | Votes | % | ±% |
|---|---|---|---|---|
| Conservative | Constance Foster | 2,372 | 50.4 | −3.5 |
| Liberal | Daniel Felton | 1,346 | 28.6 | +3.9 |
| Labour | James Jones | 984 | 20.9 | −0.6 |
| Majority | | 1,026 | 21.8 | N/A |
| Turnout | | | 64.8 | +23.3 |
| Registered electors | | 7,275 | | |
| Conservative hold | | Swing | | |

The by-election was called following the resignation of Cllr. Edward Reed.
