= 1990 Barking and Dagenham London Borough Council election =

1990 local election in England

- 3 May 1990

All 48 council seats up for election to Barking and Dagenham London Borough Council 25 seats needed for a majority
- Registered: 104,676
- Turnout: 40,402, 38.60%

	First party	Second party
Party	Labour	Residents
Seats before	37	3
Seats won	44	3
Seat change	▲7	Steady
Popular vote	69,223	4,272
Percentage	73.5	4.5
	Third party	Fourth party
Party	Liberal Democrats	Conservative
Seats before	4	3
Seats won	1 (Note: Results include those from candidates listed as Lib Dem Focus Team)	0
Seat change	▼3	▼3
Popular vote	7,372	13,233
Percentage	7.8	14.0
	Fifth party
Party	Ind. Lib Dem
Seats before	1
Seats won	0
Seat change	▼1
Popular vote	74
Percentage	0.1
- Map of the results of the 1990 Barking and Dagenham London Borough council election.
Council control before election
Labour
Council control after election
Labour

The 1990 Barking and Dagenham Borough Council election took place on 3 May 1990 to elect members of Barking and Dagenham London Borough Council in London, England. The whole council was up for election and the Labour Party stayed overwhelmingly in overall control of the council.

== Background ==
102 candidates nominated in total. Labour again ran a full slate and was the only party to do so. By contrast the Conservative Party ran only 33 candidates whilst the Liberal Democrats and the Liberal Democratic Focus Team ran a combined 17.

== Election result ==
Labour continued to win the overwhelming majority of seats - 44 out of 48. The Residents Association held their 3 seats. The Liberal Democratic Focus Team won 1 seat.

1990 Barking and Dagenham Local Elections
Party	Seats	Gains	Losses	Net gain/loss	Seats %	Votes %	Votes	+/−
Labour	44	7	0	▲7	91.7	73.5	69,223	
Residents	3	0	0	Steady	6.2	4.5	4,272	
Liberal Democrats	1	0	3	▼3	2.1	7.8	7,372	
Conservative	0	0	3	▼3	0.0	14.0	13,233	
Ind. Lib Dem	0	0	1	▼1	0.0	0.1	74	
Communist	0	0	0	Steady	0.0	0.1	66	
Total	48						94,240	

== Ward results ==
(*) - Indicates an incumbent candidate

(†) - Indicates an incumbent candidate standing in a different ward

=== Abbey ===
Abbey (3)
Party	Candidate	Votes	%	±%
Labour	Terence Bird*	1,678	64.3	−9.4
Labour	Graham Bramley*	1,581		
Labour	Mohammed Fani* (Note: Fani replaced Cllr. Abdul M. Khokhar after his resignation in 1989)	1,449		
Conservative	Danielle Flynn	454	18.6	+2.1
Liberal Democrats	Robert Porter	417	17.1	−3.0
Turnout		2,455	35.2	−1.9
Rejected ballots		11	0.4	N/A
Registered electors		6,983		
Labour hold				
Labour hold				
Labour hold				

=== Alibon ===
Alibon (2)
Party	Candidate	Votes	%	±%
Labour	Ernest White*	1,283	79.3	+7.4
Labour	Trevor Watson	1,259		
Conservative	Leonard Pullen	211	12.7	+0.6
Conservative	Lillian Pullen	197		
Liberal Democrats	John Kelly	127	7.9	−4.2
Turnout		1,697	37.5	+5.6
Rejected ballots		3	0.2	N/A
Registered electors		4,526		
Labour hold				
Labour hold				

=== Cambell ===
Cambell (3)
Party	Candidate	Votes	%	±%
Labour	Mable Arnold	2,024	85.9	+5.7
Labour	Wendola Bomberg	1,853		
Labour	Ronald Whitbread^{†} (Note: Whitbread was a sitting councillor representing the Village ward)	1,842		
Conservative	Charles Bond	361	14.1	−5.7
Conservative	David Izzard	263		
Turnout		2,558	36.8	+5.2
Rejected ballots		11	0.4	N/A
Registered electors		6,958		
Labour hold				
Labour hold				
Labour hold				

=== Chadwell Heath ===
Chadwell Heath (3)
Party	Candidate	Votes	%	±%
Residents	Albert Gibbs*	1,456	51.8	−18.7
Residents	Robert Jeyes*	1,360		
Labour	Violet Gasson	1,120	36.4	+6.9
Labour	Hilda Jones	942		
Labour	Julie West	938		
Conservative	David Jackson	353	11.9	N/A
Conservative	Karen Smith	328		
Conservative	Nicholas Smith	298		
Rejected ballots		2	0.1	N/A
Turnout		2,913	42.3	+4.7
Registered electors		6,881		
Residents hold		Swing		
Residents hold		Swing		
Residents hold		Swing		

=== Eastbrook ===
Eastbrook (3)
Party	Candidate	Votes	%	±%
Labour	Richard Blackburn*	1,860	80.1	+21.2
Labour	Frederick Tibble*	1,804		
Labour	Lawrence Bunn*	1,758		
Conservative	Malcolm Beatty	485	19.9	+2.6
Conservative	Reginald Williams	436		
Conservative	Charles McGinley	428		
Rejected ballots		4	0.2	N/A
Turnout		2,478	35.6	+3.0
Registered electors		6,963		
Labour hold		Swing		
Labour hold		Swing		
Labour hold		Swing		

=== Eastbury ===
Eastbury (2)
Party	Candidate	Votes	%	±%
Labour	Patrick Manley	1,240	52.7	+11.4
Labour	Gordon Mayor	1,131		
Lib Dem Focus Team	Stephen Churchman*	922	37.8	−20.9
Lib Dem Focus Team	Daniel Felton	780		
Conservative	Peter Burch	151	6.3	N/A
Conservative	Robert Whitton	131		
Ind. Lib Dem	David Smith*	74	3.3	N/A
Rejected ballots		3	0.1	N/A
Turnout		2,378	51.6	−0.4
Registered electors		4,607		
Labour gain from Lib Dem Focus Team		Swing		
Labour gain from Ind. Lib Dem		Swing		

=== Fanshawe ===
Fanshawe (3)
Party	Candidate	Votes	%	±%
Labour	Frederick Jones*	1,956	85.4	+14.4
Labour	Raymond Parkin* (Note: Parkin replaced Cllr. Ernest A. Turner after his death in 1988)	1,827		
Labour	John Thomas*	1,799		
Conservative	Robert Brownless	277	11.6	−12.8
Conservative	Edward Holt	256		
Conservative	William Whiter	225		
Communist	Alfred Ott	66	3.0	−1.6
Rejected ballots		11	0.5	N/A
Turnout		2,380	35.9	+6.6
Registered electors		6,620		
Labour hold		Swing		
Labour hold		Swing		
Labour hold		Swing		

=== Gascoigne ===
Gascoigne (3)
Party	Candidate	Votes	%	±%
Labour	Jeanette Alexander	1,152	51.9	+19.4
Lib Dem Focus Team	Ronwen Beadle*	1,118	48.1	−19.4
Labour	Simon Bremner	1,055		
Labour	Kathleen Flint	1,023		
Lib Dem Focus Team	Alan Cooper*	959		
Lib Dem Focus Team	Elaine Lloyd	920		
Rejected ballots		2	0.1	N/A
Turnout		2,308	37.5	−2.6
Registered electors		6,151		
Labour gain from Lib Dem Focus Team		Swing		
Lib Dem Focus Team hold		Swing		
Labour gain from Lib Dem Focus Team		Swing		

=== Goresbrook ===
Goresbrook (2)
Party	Candidate	Votes	%	±%
Labour	Alan Thomas*	1,546	78.0	
Labour	Terence Power	1,507		
Conservative	Ivy Blanchard	226	11.5	
Liberal Democrats	Roger Sparrow	204	10.4	
Rejected ballots		0	0.0	N/A
Turnout		1,869	37.8	+4.5
Registered electors		4,950		
Labour hold		Swing		
Labour hold		Swing		

=== Heath ===
Heath (3)
Party	Candidate	Votes	%	±%
Labour	Charles Fairbrass*	1,994	81.0	+17.1
Labour	Sidney Kallar	1,832		
Labour	John Lawrence*	1,830		
Conservative	Sharon Keefe	491	19.0	+0.4
Conservative	Joan Preston	423		
Conservative	William Preston	414		
Rejected ballots		15	0.6	N/A
Turnout		2,585	36.1	+3.9
Registered electors		7,157		
Labour hold		Swing		
Labour hold		Swing		
Labour hold		Swing		

=== Longbridge ===
Longbridge (3)
Party	Candidate	Votes	%	±%
Labour	Robin Dixon	1,398	47.2	+18.2
Labour	June van Roten	1,318		
Labour	Nirmal Gill	1,290		
Conservative	Brian Cook*	1,264	43.3	+6.2
Conservative	Janice Izzard*	1,228		
Conservative	John Seaman*	1,184		
Lib Dem Focus Team	Brian Beadle	304	9.6	−24.2
Liberal Democrats	Jayne Cooper	264		
Lib Dem Focus Team	Richard Felton	246		
Rejected ballots		7	0.2	N/A
Turnout		3,038	43.8	+1.1
Registered electors		6,935		
Labour gain from Conservative		Swing		
Labour gain from Conservative		Swing		
Labour gain from Conservative		Swing		

=== Manor ===
Manor (2)
Party	Candidate	Votes	%	±%
Labour	Alistair Hannah-Rogers*	1,550	80.6	+9.9
Labour	Rita Hannah-Rogers	1,483		
Conservative	Kay Needham	232	11.7	−2.1
Conservative	Marcus Needham	207		
Liberal Democrats	Peter Downs	145	7.7	−7.8
Rejected ballots		0	0.0	N/A
Turnout		1,915	40.5	+6.8
Registered electors		4,732		
Labour hold		Swing		
Labour hold		Swing		

=== Marks Gate ===
Marks Gate (1)
Party	Candidate	Votes	%	±%
Labour	Maureen Worby* (Note: Worby replaced Cllr. Donald I. Pepper after his resignation in 1988)	785	83.3	+35.5
Conservative	Ernest Blackborow	157	16.7	N/A
Rejected ballots		4	0.4	N/A
Turnout		947	44.8	+4.6
Registered electors		2,114		
Labour hold		Swing		

=== Parsloes ===
Parsloes (2)
Party	Candidate	Votes	%	±%
Labour	John Dias-Broughton*	1,506	72.4	+2.7
Labour	Brian Walker*	1,490		
Conservative	Barry Taylor	323	15.6	+1.2
Liberal Democrats	Wendy Churchman	247	11.9	−4.0
Rejected ballots		6	0.3	N/A
Turnout		1,992	39.0	+3.7
Registered electors		5,109		
Labour hold		Swing		
Labour hold		Swing		

=== River ===
River (2)
Party	Candidate	Votes	%	±%
Labour	John Wainwright*	1,224	80.3	+37.0
Labour	Inder Jamu* (Note: Jamu replaced Cllr. Patricia A. Twomey after her resignation in 1988)	1,103		
Conservative	John Dutton	296	19.7	+6.6
Conservative	Peter Dutton	273		
Rejected ballots		9	0.6	N/A
Turnout		1,621	33.2	+1.8
Registered electors		4,885		
Labour hold		Swing		
Labour hold		Swing		

=== Thames ===
Thames (2)
Party	Candidate	Votes	%	±%
Labour	George Shaw	1,714	89.8	+6.6
Labour	Royston Patient	1,680		
Liberal Democrats	Samuel Hodge	193	10.2	−6.6
Rejected ballots		9	0.5	N/A
Turnout		1,913	41.9	+2.3
Registered electors		4,564		
Labour hold		Swing		
Labour hold		Swing		

=== Triptons ===
Triptons (3)
Party	Candidate	Votes	%	±%
Labour	George Brooker	2,052	71.6	+0.5
Labour	John Davis	1,885		
Labour	Cameron Geddes	1,672		
Conservative	Leonard Dutton	441	16.9	N/A
Liberal Democrats	David Evans	302	11.6	−17.3
Rejected ballots		0	0.0	N/A
Turnout		2,703	38.6	+6.0
Registered electors		6,993		
Labour hold		Swing		
Labour hold		Swing		
Labour hold		Swing		

=== Valence ===
Valence (3)
Party	Candidate	Votes	%	±%
Labour	Jean Bruce*	Unopposed		
Labour	Leonard Collins*	Unopposed		
Labour	Bryan Osborn*	Unopposed		
Rejected ballots		0	0.0	N/A
Registered electors		6,930 (Note: Because the election was unopposed, this amount has not been included in the registered electors total for this election)		
Turnout		0	0.0	N/A
Labour hold		Swing		
Labour hold		Swing		
Labour hold		Swing		

=== Village ===
Village (3)
Party	Candidate	Votes	%	±%
Labour	Darrin Best	1,956	75.4	+2.7
Labour	Katherine Golden	1,920		
Labour	William Dale	1,914		
Conservative	Kenneth Coombs	457	15.9	−11.4
Conservative	Terence Mallindine	396		
Conservative	Royston Oliver	367		
Liberal Democrats	Carole Sparrow	224	8.7	N/A
Rejected ballots		5	0.2	N/A
Turnout		2,652	35.6	+4.8
Registered electors		7,448		
Labour hold		Swing		
Labour hold		Swing		
Labour hold		Swing		

== By-elections between 1990 and 1994 ==
=== Alibon ===
Alibon by-election, 13 February 1992
Party	Candidate	Votes	%	±%
Labour	Patricia Twomey	661	56.3	−22.8
Conservative	Margaret Jones	264	22.5	+9.5
Liberal Democrats	Sean Healy	249	21.2	+13.4
Majority		397	40.7	N/A
Turnout		33.8	26.1	−11.4
Registered electors		4,503		
Labour hold		Swing		

The by-election was called following the resignation of Cllr. Trevor Watson.

=== Chadwell Heath ===
Chadwell Heath by-election, 2 April 1992
Party	Candidate	Votes	%	±%
Residents	Ronald Curtis	1,107	49.3	−0.4
Labour	Violet Gasson	819	36.5	−1.7
Conservative	John Graham	318	14.2	+14.2
Majority		288	12.8	N/A
Turnout			33.3	−9.0
Registered electors		6,756		
Residents hold		Swing		

The by-election was called following the death of Cllr. Raymond Gowland.
