= 1978 Barking London Borough Council election =

English local council election

The 1978 Barking Borough Council election took place on 4 May 1978 to elect members of Barking London Borough Council in London, England. The whole council was up for election and the Labour Party stayed in overall control of the council.

== Background ==
6 new wards were created for this election and 113 candidates nominated in total. Labour, once again, ran a full slate of candidates, and in keeping with the council's strong Labour vote, no other party ran in all wards. The Conservative Party had the second most candidates on the ballot at 28.

== Election result ==
Labour continued to win a large majority of seats - 42 out of 48. For the first time since the 1968 elections the Conservatives won seats as well, 3 in all.

== Ward results ==
=== Abbey ===
Abbey (3)
Party	Candidate	Votes	%	±%
Labour	Jean Bruce	1,474	53.7	−2.0
Labour	Sydney Hamilton	1,470		N/A
Labour	Horace Howie	1,447		N/A
Conservative	Brian Cook	776	28.3	+10.4
Liberal	Ronwen Beadle	312	11.4	−15.0
Liberal	Angela Bush	297		N/A
National Front	Keith Taylor	182	6.6	N/A
National Front	Sandra Hatchman	160		N/A
National Front	Stanley Pulfer	153		N/A
Turnout			41.6	+9.8
Registered electors		6,827		
Labour hold		Swing		
Labour hold		Swing		
Labour hold		Swing		

=== Alibon ===
Alibon (2)
Party	Candidate	Votes	%	±%
Labour	Thomas Reynolds	945	70.0	N/A
Labour	Ernest White	944		N/A
Conservative	Reginald Johnson	366	27.1	N/A
Conservative	William Maule	324		N/A
Communist	Frederick Creamer	39	2.9	N/A
Turnout			28.5	N/A
Registered electors		4,817		
Labour win (new seat)				
Labour win (new seat)				

=== Cambell ===
Cambell (3)
Party	Candidate	Votes	%	±%
Labour	Joseph Butler	1,552	63.4	−26.8
Labour	Sidney Cole	1,481		N/A
Labour	Bertie Roycraft	1,295		N/A
Conservative	Dorothea Reed	542	22.1	+12.3
Liberal	Robert Porter	233	9.5	N/A
Communist	Danielle Nicholls	121	4.9	N/A
Turnout			31.9	+11.0
Registered electors		7,386		
Labour hold		Swing		
Labour hold		Swing		
Labour hold		Swing		

=== Chadwell Heath ===
Chadwell Heath (3)
Party	Candidate	Votes	%	±%
Residents	Cyril Ayres	2,100	76.1	+21.2
Residents	Joan Harper	2,097		N/A
Residents	Peggy Miller	2,033		N/A
Labour	Eric Harris	613	22.2	−5.5
Labour	James Jones	536		N/A
Labour	Eric Mansell	495		N/A
Communist	Alfred Ott	46	1.7	−3.0
Turnout			40.1	−10.2
Registered electors		6,899		
Residents hold		Swing		
Residents hold		Swing		
Residents hold		Swing		

=== Eastbrook ===
Eastbrook (3)
Party	Candidate	Votes	%	±%
Labour	Frederick Tibble	1,202	48.2	−32.1
Labour	Leonard Collins	1,197		N/A
Labour	George Crouch	1,176		N/A
Conservative	Alexander Owen	1,099	44.1	+30.9
Conservative	Sydney Horrell	1.094		N/A
Conservative	Ada Horrell	1.089		N/A
Liberal	Edward Bullock	192	7.7	N/A
Turnout			37.1	+17.8
Registered electors		7,364		
Labour hold		Swing		
Labour hold		Swing		
Labour hold		Swing		

=== Eastbury ===
Eastbury (2)
Party	Candidate	Votes	%	±%
Labour	Maud Ball	1,043	68.5	N/A
Labour	Michael O'Shea	902		N/A
Liberal	Alan Beadle	479	31.5	N/A
Liberal	Martin Taylor	465		N/A
Turnout			35.5	N/A
Registered electors		4,888		
Labour win (new seat)				
Labour win (new seat)				

=== Fanshawe ===
Fanshawe (3)
Party	Candidate	Votes	%	±%
Labour	Frederick Jones	1,371	72.4	−8.9
Labour	John Thomas	1,244		N/A
Labour	Ernest Turner	1,221		N/A
Conservative	William Russell	459	24.2	+15.9
Conservative	Ronald Rands	428		N/A
Conservative	Alan Wiles	400		N/A
Communist	Keith Bird	64	3.4	−7.0
Turnout			30.2	+10.6
Registered electors		6,885		
Labour hold		Swing		
Labour hold		Swing		
Labour hold		Swing		

=== Gascoigne ===
Gascoigne (3)
Party	Candidate	Votes	%	±%
Labour	Julia Engwell	1,648	64.0	−18.8
Labour	John Lawrence	1,501		N/A
Labour	Brian Walker	1,498		N/A
Conservative	Audrey Beasley	486	18.9	−8.4
Liberal	David Spender	284	11.0	N/A
National Front	Colin London	155	6.0	N/A
National Front	Harold Nash	123		N/A
Turnout			34.7	+8.3
Registered electors		7,092		
Labour hold		Swing		
Labour hold		Swing		
Labour hold		Swing		

=== Goresbrook ===
Goresbrook (2)
Party	Candidate	Votes	%	±%
Labour	David Dodd	1,018	66.4	N/A
Labour	Edith Bradley	997		N/A
Conservative	Victor Reeves	440	28.7	N/A
Communist	Avis Greenway	76	5.0	N/A
Turnout			30.6	N/A
Registered electors		5,230		
Labour win (new seat)				
Labour win (new seat)				

=== Heath ===
Heath (3)
Party	Candidate	Votes	%	±%
Labour	Charles Fairbrass	1,502	64.8	−5.5
Labour	John Allam	1,442		N/A
Labour	Brian Wilkins	1,331		N/A
Conservative	Leonard Groves	681	29.4	−5.7
Conservative	Joan Preston	660		N/A
Communist	Helena Ott	135	5.8	−0.2
Turnout			30.4	+13.1
Registered electors		7,698		
Labour hold		Swing		
Labour hold		Swing		
Labour hold		Swing		

=== Longbridge ===
Longbridge (3)
Party	Candidate	Votes	%	±%
Conservative	Dennis Barnett	1,846	59.6	+27.8
Conservative	Edward Reed	1,780		N/A
Conservative	John Seaman	1,724		N/A
Labour	Doris Jones	998	32.7	−16.5
Labour	John Cavanagh	997		N/A
Labour	Marie Cole	915		N/A
Liberal	Brian Beadle	254	8.2	−10.7
Liberal	Eric Lowers	218		N/A
Liberal	Dennis Keenan	217		N/A
Turnout			45.2	+16.1
Registered electors		7,324		
Conservative gain from Labour		Swing		
Conservative gain from Labour		Swing		
Conservative gain from Labour		Swing		

=== Manor ===
Manor (2)
Party	Candidate	Votes	%	±%
Labour	Albert Ball	1,118	63.8	+17.0
Labour	James Mannering	1,043		N/A
Conservative	Bernadette Long	462	26.4	+7.2
Liberal	Muriel Stolton	172	9.8	N/A
Turnout			34.1	+26.6
Registered electors		4,957		
Labour hold		Swing		
Labour hold		Swing		

=== Marks Gate ===
Marks Gate (1)
Party	Candidate	Votes	%	±%
Labour	Arthur Biles	458	58.7	N/A
Conservative	Michael O'Brien	300	38.5	N/A
Communist	Daniel Connor	22	2.8	N/A
Turnout			32.2	N/A
Registered electors		2,441		
Labour win (new seat)				

=== Parsloes ===
Parsloes (2)
Party	Candidate	Votes	%	±%
Labour	Mabel Arnold	1,092	61.1	N/A
Labour	Millicent Preston	1,057		N/A
Conservative	Janet Barnett	486	27.2	N/A
Liberal	Daniel Felton	209	11.7	N/A
Turnout			32.5	N/A
Registered electors		5,307		
Labour win (new seat)				
Labour win (new seat)				

=== River ===
River (2)
Party	Candidate	Votes	%	±%
Labour	Leonard Bryant	990	67.0	−13.9
Labour	James Morton	892		N/A
Conservative	Jane Calver	429	29.0	+16.4
Conservative	William Whiter	376		N/A
Communist	Brian Nicholls	58	3.9	−2.6
Turnout			29.8	+10.4
Registered electors		5,243		
Labour hold		Swing		
Labour hold		Swing		

=== Thames ===
Thames (2)
Party	Candidate	Votes	%	±%
Labour	Douglas Waters	1,649	86.1	N/A
Labour	George Shaw	1,647		N/A
Liberal	Ronald Stolton	267	13.9	N/A
Turnout			38.5	N/A
Registered electors		5,147		
Labour win (new seat)				
Labour win (new seat)				

=== Triptons ===
Triptons (3)
Party	Candidate	Votes	%	±%
Labour	George Brooker	1,185	65.9	N/A
Labour	John Davis	1,152		N/A
Labour	William Bellamy	1,077		N/A
Conservative	Alan Sears	513	28.5	N/A
Conservative	George Winch	391		N/A
Communist	Danny Marshall	100	5.6	N/A
Turnout			27.5	N/A
Registered electors		7,213		
Labour win (new seat)				
Labour win (new seat)				
Labour win (new seat)				

=== Valence ===
Valence (3)
Party	Candidate	Votes	%	±%
Labour	Richard Blackburn	1,383	60.8	−9.6
Labour	Matthew Eales	1,267		N/A
Labour	Joanne Williams	1,249		N/A
Conservative	Terence McManus	432	19.0	+8.7
Conservative	William Middleton	358		N/A
Independent	Vera Cridland	213	9.4	N/A
National Front	John Benjafield	185	8.1	N/A
National Front	John Roberts	181		N/A
National Front	Michael Sowerby	168		N/A
Communist	Brian Corbett	62	2.7	−6.9
Turnout			30.7	+12.0
Registered electors		7,092		
Labour hold		Swing		
Labour hold		Swing		
Labour hold		Swing		

=== Village ===
Village (3)
Party	Candidate	Votes	%	±%
Labour	Matthew Spencer	1,256	48.3	−16.1
Labour	Harry Tindell	1,161		N/A
Labour	Peter Bradley	1,156		N/A
Conservative	Terence Mallindine	851	32.8	+22.8
Conservative	John Kinnie	839		N/A
Liberal	George Poole	392	15.1	−1.3
Communist	Paul Greenaway	99	3.8	−0.6
Turnout			32.0	+10.4
Registered electors		7,614		
Labour hold		Swing		
Labour hold		Swing		
Labour hold		Swing		

== By-elections between 1978 and 1982 ==
=== Cambell ===
Cambell by-election, 29 March 1979
Party	Candidate	Votes	%	±%
Labour	Eric Harris	1,019	48.4	−15.0
Conservative	Brian Cook	906	43.0	+20.9
National Front	John Benjafield	106	5.0	N/A
Liberal	Daniel Felton	76	3.6	−5.9
Majority		113	5.4	N/A
Turnout			28.7	−3.2
Registered electors		7,354		
Labour hold		Swing		

The by-election was called following the death of Cllr. Bertie Roycraft.

=== Gascoigne ===
Gascoigne by-election, 3 May 1979
Party	Candidate	Votes	%	±%
Labour	James Jones	2,258	54.7	−9.3
Conservative	Stanley Bray	1,255	30.4	+11.5
Liberal	David Spender	614	14.9	+3.9
Majority		1,003	24.3	N/A
Turnout			60.6	+35.9
Registered electors		6,865		
Labour hold		Swing		

The by-election was called following the death of Cllr. Julia Engwell.

=== Triptons ===
Triptons by-election, 4 December 1980
Party	Candidate	Votes	%	±%
Labour	Alan Stevens	859	68.3	+2.4
Liberal	Edward Bullock	234	18.6	N/A
Conservative	Sylvia Jones	120	9.5	−19.0
National Front	Ronald Ferrett	44	3.5	N/A
Majority		625	49.7	N/A
Turnout			17.4	−10.1
Registered electors		7,244		
Labour hold		Swing		

The by-election was called following the death of Cllr. William Bellamy.
