= Eastbury (ward) =

Electoral ward in London, England

Coordinates: 51.535°N 0.1075°E

- Electoral ward for the Barking and Dagenham London Borough Council
- Eastbury ward boundaries since 2022
- Borough: Barking and Dagenham
- County: Greater London

Current electoral ward
- Created: 1978
- Number of members: 3
- Councillors: Mohammed Khan; Dominic Twomey; Maureen Worby
- GSS code: E05000031 (2002–2022); E05014060 (2022–present)

Eastbury is an electoral ward in the London Borough of Barking and Dagenham.

== Barking and Dagenham council elections since 2022 ==
There was a revision of ward boundaries in Barking and Dagenham in 2022.

=== 2026 election ===
The election took place on 7 May 2026.

2026 Barking and Dagenham London Borough Council election: Eastbury
Party	Candidate	Votes	%	±%
Labour	Mohammed Khan	1,112	31.6	−32.9
Labour	Dominic Twomey	1,067	30.3	N/A
Labour	Maureen Worby	1,028	29.2	N/A
Green	Mohammod Uddin	994	28.7	N/A
Reform	Costel Filipescu	904	25.7	N/A
Reform	Zinaida Birlea	887	25.2	N/A
Green	Romas Bugaitis	877	24.9	N/A
Reform	Sisir Das	861	24.5	N/A
Green	Pinar Polat	813	23.1	N/A
Conservative	Monzour Ahamed	411	11.7	N/A
Conservative	Joshua Yousaf	401	11.4	N/A
Conservative	Azizur Rahman	325	9.2	N/A
Liberal Democrats	Elizabeth Makinde	227	6.4	N/A
Turnout		3,517	33.7	+12.6
Registered electors		10,442		
Labour hold		Swing		
Labour hold		Swing		
Labour hold		Swing		

=== 2022 election ===
The election took place on 5 May 2022.

2022 Barking and Dagenham London Borough Council election: Eastbury
Party	Candidate	Votes	%	±%
Labour	Emily Rodwell	1,494	26.5	N/A
Labour	Mohammed Khan	1,381	24.5	N/A
Labour	Faraaz Shaukat	1,321	23.4	N/A
Conservative	Eunice Acheampomaa	500	8.9	N/A
Conservative	Poli Begum	483	8.6	N/A
Conservative	Costel Filipescu	469	8.3	N/A
Turnout		2,139	21.1	N/A
Registered electors		10,041		
Labour win (new boundaries)				
Labour win (new boundaries)				
Labour win (new boundaries)				

== 2002–2022 Barking and Dagenham council elections ==
Eastbury ward boundaries from 2002 to 2022

There was a revision of ward boundaries in Barking and Dagenham in 2002.

=== 2018 election ===
The election took place on 3 May 2018.

=== 2014 election ===
The election took place on 22 May 2014.

=== 2010 election ===
The election on 6 May 2010 took place on the same day as the United Kingdom general election.

=== 2006 election ===
The election took place on 4 May 2006.

=== 2002 election ===
The election took place on 2 May 2002.

2002 Barking and Dagenham London Borough Council election: Eastbury
Party	Candidate	Votes	%	±%
Liberal Democrats	Alan Cooper	986	56.4	+5.3
Liberal Democrats	Jayne Cooper	930		
Liberal Democrats	Daniel Felton	885		
Labour	June Arnold	763	43.6	−5.3
Labour	Pat Manley	760		
Labour	Rocky Gill	648		
Turnout		1,873	25.8	−14.3
Registered electors		7,255		
Liberal Democrats win (new boundaries)				
Liberal Democrats win (new boundaries)				
Liberal Democrats win (new boundaries)				

== 1978–2002 Barking and Dagenham council elections ==
The name of the borough and council changed from Barking to Barking and Dagenham on 1 January 1980.

=== 1998 election ===
The election took place on 7 May 1998.

=== 1994 election ===
The election took place on 5 May 1994.

=== 1990 election ===
The election took place on 3 May 1990.

=== 1986 election ===
The election took place on 8 May 1986.

=== 1982 election ===
The election took place on 6 May 1982.

=== 1978 election ===
The election took place on 4 May 1978.

1978 Barking London Borough Council election: Eastbury
Party	Candidate	Votes	%	±%
Labour	Maud Ball	1,043	68.5	N/A
Labour	Michael O'Shea	902		N/A
Liberal	Alan Beadle	479	31.5	N/A
Liberal	Martin Taylor	465		N/A
Turnout			35.5	N/A
Registered electors		4,888		
Labour win (new seat)				
Labour win (new seat)				
