= 2014 Barking and Dagenham London Borough Council election =

2014 local election in England

2014 Barking and Dagenham Council election
- 23 May 2014

All 51 council seats
	First party
	Lab
Leader	Liam Smith
Party	Labour
Leader since	2009
Leader's seat	Whalebone
Last election	51 seats, 47.2%
Seats won	51
Seat change	Steady
Popular vote	28,871
Percentage	52.0
Swing	▲4.8%
- Map of the results of the 2014 Barking and Dagenham council election. Labour in red.
Leader of Largest Party before election
Labour
Subsequent Leader of Largest Party
Labour

The 2014 Barking and Dagenham Council election took place on 23 May 2014 to elect members of Barking and Dagenham Council in England. This was on the same day as other United Kingdom local elections.

== Background ==
Labour won all 51 seats on the council in 2010, but by the time of this election had only 44 councillors due to defections with Robert Douglas, Dorothy Hunt, Graham Letchford and Tariq Saeed defecting to the UK Independence Party, and James McDermott, Barry Poulton and Gerald Vincent defecting to the Socialist Labour Party. All of these councillors stood for re-election in the borough representing their new parties (aside from Letchford, who stood in the Enfield Council election), but none retained their seats, with Labour candidates winning all 51 seats for the second consecutive election. The only ward where Labour faced any real challenge was Mayesbrook, where the borough's former Labour Mayor Dorothy Hunt, now representing UKIP, failed to win a seat by 12 votes.

UKIP stood candidates in every ward for the first time, and finished as runners-up to Labour in every ward except Longbridge. The Conservatives and Liberal Democrats remained on the fringes in the borough. The British National Party, who won 12 seats on the council in 2006, all of which they lost in 2010, declined even further at this election, only standing candidates in three wards and picking up a total of 1,137 votes, placing them sixth overall. Other parties to field candidates in the borough were the Greens, Socialist Labour Party and TUSC. The Europeans Party, a pro-EU party who support the rights of EU citizens in the UK, also stood a candidate. There were also two independent candidates.

== Election results ==
Barking & Dagenham local election results 2014
Party	Seats	Gains	Losses	Net gain/loss	Seats %	Votes %	Votes	+/−
Labour	51	0	0	±0.0	100.0	52.0	28,871	+4.8
UKIP	0	0	0	±0.0	0.0	26.7	14,847	+23.3
Conservative	0	0	0	±0.0	0.0	10.3	5,742	-5.8
Liberal Democrats	0	0	0	±0.0	0.0	3.5	1,942	-7.6
Green	0	0	0	±0.0	0.0	2.9	1,613	+2.6
BNP	0	0	0	±0.0	0.0	1.7	971	-16.1
Socialist Labour	0	0	0	±0.0	0.0	1.4	793	N/A
Independent	0	0	0	±0.0	0.0	0.9	496	-2.5
TUSC	0	0	0	±0.0	0.0	0.4	202	N/A
Europeans Party	0	0	0	±0.0	0.0	0.2	94	N/A

== Ward results ==
=== Abbey ===
Abbey (3 seats)
Party	Candidate	Votes	%	±%
Labour	Laila Butt	2,252	26.2	N/A
Labour	Danielle Doyle	2,072	24.1	N/A
Labour	Giasuddin Miah	1,966	22.9	N/A
UKIP	Tariq Saeed	947	7.5	N/A
Conservative	Modoris Ali	410	4.8	N/A
Conservative	Emran Chowdhury	323	3.8	N/A
Green	Natalija Kitkovska	307	3.6	N/A
Conservative	Amaniampong Ampomah	292	3.4	N/A
Liberal Democrats	Ryan Edwards	221	2.6	N/A
Independent	Ostafe Marius-Alexandrun)	94	1.1	N/A
Turnout		3,193	36.8	−21.2
Registered electors		8,672		
Labour hold		Swing		
Labour hold		Swing		
Labour hold		Swing		

=== Alibon ===
Alibon (3 seats)
Party	Candidate	Votes	%	±%
Labour	Darren Rodwell	1,398	24.6	N/A
Labour	Christopher Hughes	1,389	24.4	N/A
Labour	Sanchia Alasia	1,240	21.8	N/A
UKIP	Norman Wood	974	12.1	N/A
Conservative	Jakir Hussain	221	3.9	N/A
Conservative	Md. Neamat Ullah	180	3.4	N/A
Conservative	Mohammed Zaman	145	2.5	N/A
Liberal Democrats	Terence London	143	2.5	N/A
Turnout		2,471	34.3	−24.9
Registered electors		7,210		
Labour hold		Swing		
Labour hold		Swing		
Labour hold		Swing		

=== Becontree ===
Becontree (3 seats)
Party	Candidate	Votes	%	±%
Labour	Evelyn Carpenter	2,098	25.2	N/A
Labour	Faruk Choudhury	1,885	22.7	N/A
Labour	James Ogungbose	1,784	21.5	N/A
UKIP	Robert Douglas	858	10.3	N/A
UKIP	Yvonne Douglas	826	10.0	N/A
Conservative	Lorraine Larner	294	3.5	N/A
Conservative	Mohammed Hosain	211	2.5	N/A
Conservative	Ricci Smith	208	2.5	N/A
Liberal Democrats	David De Cruz	151	1.8	N/A
Turnout		3,169	36.8	−23.4
Registered electors		8,601		
Labour hold		Swing		
Labour hold		Swing		
Labour hold		Swing		

=== Chadwell Heath ===
Chadwell Heath (3 seats)
Party	Candidate	Votes	%	±%
Labour	Jeffrey Wade	1,416	20.1	N/A
Labour	Afolasade Bright	1,389	19.7	N/A
Labour	Sam Tarry	1,356	19.2	N/A
UKIP	Ronald Curtis	869	12.3	N/A
UKIP	Ingrid Spindler	805	11.4	N/A
Conservative	Albert Sacky	377	5.3	N/A
Conservative	Jamil Miah	354	5.0	N/A
Green	Debbie Rosaman	320	4.5	N/A
Liberal Democrats	David Croft	160	2.3	N/A
Turnout		2,710	36.5	−24.9
Registered electors		7,424		
Labour hold		Swing		
Labour hold		Swing		
Labour hold		Swing		

=== Eastbrook ===
Eastbrook (3 seats)
Party	Candidate	Votes	%	±%
Labour	Michael McCarthy	1,581	21.7	N/A
Labour	Edna Fergus	1,397	19.1	N/A
Labour	Anthony Ramsay	1,326	18.8	N/A
UKIP	Richard Kelly	1,102	15.1	N/A
UKIP	Jonathan Gay	960	13.1	N/A
Conservative	Susan Connelly	544	7.5	N/A
BNP	Anthony McKay	222	3.0	N/A
BNP	Paul Sturdy	166	2.3	N/A
Turnout		2,833	36.5	−26.5
Registered electors		7,757		
Labour hold		Swing		
Labour hold		Swing		
Labour hold		Swing		

=== Eastbury ===
Eastbury (3 seats)
Party	Candidate	Votes	%	±%
Labour	Jeannette Alexander	1,691	26.7	N/A
Labour	Hardial Singh Rai	1,403	22.2	N/A
Labour	Faraaz Shaukat	1,356	21.4	N/A
UKIP	Hayat M'Barkii	832	13.1	N/A
Conservative	Juliet Amoah	314	5.0	N/A
Socialist Labour	James McDermott	276	4.4	N/A
Conservative	Alin Rahman	242	3.8	N/A
Conservative	Pushpa Choudhury	214	3.4	N/A
Turnout		2,757	34.6	−24.8
Registered electors		7,962		
Labour hold		Swing		
Labour hold		Swing		
Labour hold		Swing		

=== Gascoigne ===
Gascoigne (3 seats)
Party	Candidate	Votes	%	±%
Labour	Saima Ashraf	1,977	27.2	N/A
Labour	Abdul Gafoor Aziz	1,896	26.1	N/A
Labour	Dominic Twomey	1,757	24.2	N/A
UKIP	James Silverfox	494	6.2	N/A
Conservative	Krishan Kumar Kar	274	3.8	N/A
Independent	Mampuya Pongo	226	3.1	N/A
Conservative	Monwara Khatun	216	3.0	N/A
Conservative	Isaac Mukasa	172	2.4	N/A
TUSC	Peter Mason	146	2.0	N/A
TUSC	Ruth Mason	143	2.0	N/A
Turnout		2,750	37.6	−20.8
Registered electors		7,319		
Labour hold		Swing		
Labour hold		Swing		
Labour hold		Swing		

=== Goresbrook ===
Goresbrook (3 seats)
Party	Candidate	Votes	%	±%
Labour	Simon Bremner	1,518	23.2	N/A
Labour	Irma Freeborn	1,471	22.4	N/A
Labour	Moin Quadri	1,290	19.7	N/A
UKIP	Alan Kiff	1,023	15.6	N/A
BNP	Robert Taylor	469	7.2	N/A
Conservative	Nadia Khatun	236	3.6	N/A
Conservative	Sultana Hussain	224	3.4	N/A
Conservative	Pearle Onochie	189	2.9	N/A
Liberal Democrats	Nzingha Shukura	131	2.0	N/A
Turnout		2,713	34.7	23.0
Registered electors		7,812		
Labour hold		Swing		
Labour hold		Swing		
Labour hold		Swing		

=== Heath ===
Heath (3 seats)
Party	Candidate	Votes	%	±%
Labour	Linda Reason	1,603	26.5	N/A
Labour	David Miles	1,504	24.8	N/A
Labour	Daniel Young	1,380	22.8	N/A
UKIP	Connor Harnett	1,021	16.9	N/A
Conservative	Faruk Miah	338	5.6	N/A
Liberal Democrats	Janet Koranteng	210	3.5	N/A
Turnout		2,629	34.9	−24.0
Registered electors		7,523		
Labour hold		Swing		
Labour hold		Swing		
Labour hold		Swing		

=== Longbridge ===
Longbridge (3 seats)
Party	Candidate	Votes	%	±%
Labour	Rocky Gill	2,288	24.1	N/A
Labour	Syed Ahammad	1,998	21.0	N/A
Labour	Lynda Rice	1,752	18.4	N/A
Conservative	Dr. Shahidur Rahman	856	9.0	N/A
UKIP	Rumana Tahir	623	6.6	N/A
Conservative	Glyn Lewis	485	5.1	N/A
Conservative	Richard Semitego	401	4.2	N/A
Green	Lorna Tooley	283	3.0	N/A
Liberal Democrats	Mohammod Uddin	275	2.9	N/A
Socialist Labour	Gerald Vincent	272	2.9	N/A
Independent	Shaheryaar Baig	270	2.8	N/A
Turnout		3,621	43.7	−25.4
Registered electors		8,287		
Labour hold		Swing		
Labour hold		Swing		
Labour hold		Swing		

=== Mayesbrook ===
Mayesbrook (3 seats)
Party	Candidate	Votes	%	±%
Labour	Danielle Smith	1,217	21.3	N/A
Labour	Kashif Haroon	1,105	19.4	N/A
Labour	Adegboyega Oloyede	1,073	18.8	N/A
UKIP	Dorothy Hunt	1,061	18.6	N/A
Green	Antony Rablen	353	6.2	N/A
BNP	Giuseppe De Santis	280	4.9	N/A
Conservative	Sufia Begum	252	4.4	N/A
Conservative	Md. Foyzur Rahman	196	3.4	N/A
Conservative	Ahmed Shahjahan	166	2.9	N/A
Turnout		2,432	34.3	−25.2
Registered electors		7,093		
Labour hold		Swing		
Labour hold		Swing		
Labour hold		Swing		

=== Parsloes ===
Parsloes (3 seats)
Party	Candidate	Votes	%	±%
Labour	Christopher Rice	1,317	25.2	N/A
Labour	Elizabeth Kangethe	1,252	23.9	N/A
Labour	Linda Zanitchkhah	1,111	21.3	N/A
UKIP	Richard Hall	900	17.2	N/A
Conservative	Goyas Miah	249	4.8	N/A
Conservative	Zahanara Ali	202	3.9	N/A
Conservative	Numaun Chowdhury	196	3.7	N/A
Turnout		2,285	33.1	−24.6
Registered electors		6,901		
Labour hold		Swing		
Labour hold		Swing		
Labour hold		Swing		

=== River ===
River (3 seats)
Party	Candidate	Votes	%	±%
Labour	Peter Chand	1,668	27.7	N/A
Labour	Eileen Keller	1,668	27.7	N/A
Labour	Amardeep Singh Jamu	1,491	24.8	N/A
UKIP	Lorraine Harris	875	14.5	N/A
Conservative	Husneara Majid	317	5.3	N/A
Turnout		2,622	35.7	−25.4
Registered electors		7,339		
Labour hold		Swing		
Labour hold		Swing		
Labour hold		Swing		

=== Thames ===
Thames (3 seats)
Party	Candidate	Votes	%	±%
Labour	Josephine Channer	1,720	24.0	N/A
Labour	Cameron Geddes	1,622	22.6	N/A
Labour	Bill Turner	1,573	22.0	N/A
UKIP	Joyce Cracknell	655	9.1	N/A
UKIP	Pamela Dumbleton	644	9.0	N/A
Conservative	Reba Begum	266	3.7	N/A
Socialist Labour	Barry Poulton	245	3.4	N/A
Conservative	Andrew Boff	244	3.4	N/A
Conservative	Bijan Dutta	138	1.9	N/A
TUSC	Joseph Mambulmh	56	0.8	N/A
Turnout		2,626	37.4	−23.2
Registered electors		7,017		
Labour hold		Swing		
Labour hold		Swing		
Labour hold		Swing		

=== Valence ===
Valence (3 seats)
Party	Candidate	Votes	%	±%
Labour	Jane Jones	1,471	24.0	N/A
Labour	Maureen Worby	1,403	22.8	N/A
Labour	Syed Ghani	1,243	20.2	N/A
UKIP	Christopher Ward	1,004	16.3	N/A
Green	Alexander Hollis	350	5.7	N/A
Conservative	Ahia Chowdhury	279	4.5	N/A
Conservative	Mobarock Ali	223	3.6	N/A
Conservative	Istor Miah	166	2.7	N/A
Turnout		2,554	34.8	−22.6
Registered electors		7,344		
Labour hold		Swing		
Labour hold		Swing		
Labour hold		Swing		

=== Village ===
Village (3 seats)
Party	Candidate	Votes	%	±%
Labour	Lee Waker	2,031	33.8	N/A
Labour	Philip Waker	1,892	31.5	N/A
Labour	Margaret Mullane	1,889	31.5	N/A
Liberal Democrats	Christine Watson	190	3.2	N/A
Turnout		2,956	39.9	−19.1
Registered electors		7,409		
Labour hold		Swing		
Labour hold		Swing		
Labour hold		Swing		

=== Whalebone ===
Whalebone (3 seats)
Party	Candidate	Votes	%	±%
Labour	John White	1,625	23.6	N/A
Labour	Melanie Bartlett	1,620	23.6	N/A
Labour	Liam Smith	1,526	22.2	N/A
UKIP	Albert Bedwell	867	12.6	N/A
Conservative	Juhel Ahmed	515	7.5	N/A
Conservative	Jean Cockling	514	7.5	N/A
Liberal Democrats	William George	204	3.0	N/A
Turnout		2,796	37.6	−26.6
Registered electors		7,427		
Labour hold		Swing		
Labour hold		Swing		
Labour hold		Swing		

== By-elections between 2014 and 2018 ==
There were no by-elections.
