= 1986 Barking and Dagenham London Borough Council election =

1986 local election in England

The 1986 Barking and Dagenham Borough Council election took place on 8 May 1986 to elect members of Barking and Dagenham London Borough Council in London, England. The whole council was up for election and the Labour Party stayed in overall control of the council.

== Background ==
108 candidates nominated in total. Labour again ran a full slate and was the only party to do so. By contrast the Conservative Party ran only 21 candidates whilst the combined SDP-Liberal Alliance and the Liberal Democratic Focus Team ran 24.

== Election result ==
Labour continued to win a large majority of seats - 35 out of 48. The Conservatives and the Residents Association each held their 3 seats. The SDP–Liberal Alliance/Liberal Focus Team won 5 seats and 2 Independents were also elected.

== Ward results ==
=== Abbey ===
Abbey (3)
Party	Candidate	Votes	%	±%
Labour	Terence Bird	1,330	54.9	+2.7
Labour	Graham Bramley	1,329		
Labour	Abdul Khokhar	1,155		
Alliance	Brian Beadle	488	20.1	−4.2
Alliance	Martin Taylor	421		
Conservative	Reginald Knowles	399	16.5	−7.0
Alliance	Charlotte Winters	368		
Independent	Derek Newcombe	207	8.5	N/A
Independent	Barbara Newcombe	204		
Turnout			37.1	−2.4
Registered electors		6,661		
Labour hold		Swing		
Labour hold		Swing		
Labour hold		Swing		

=== Alibon ===
Alibon (2)
Party	Candidate	Votes	%	±%
Labour	David Cooper	1,061	71.9	+19.7
Labour	Ernest White	1,013		
Alliance	John Carter	236	16.0	−13.8
Conservative	Doris Taylor	179	12.1	−5.9
Conservative	John Taylor	177		
Turnout			31.9	−0.3
Registered electors		4,714		
Labour hold		Swing		
Labour hold		Swing		

=== Cambell ===
Cambell (3)
Party	Candidate	Votes	%	±%
Labour	Joseph Butler	1,559	80.2	+11.8
Labour	Marjorie Creasy	1,422		
Labour	Mabel Arnold	1,352		
Conservative	Charles Bond	385	19.8	−11.8
Conservative	Trevor Wade	336		
Turnout			31.6	−0.3
Registered electors		7,120		
Labour hold		Swing		
Labour hold		Swing		
Labour hold		Swing		

=== Chadwell Heath ===
Chadwell Heath (3)
Party	Candidate	Votes	%	±%
Residents	Albert Gibbs	1,643	70.5	−9.8
Residents	Raymond Gowland	1,585		
Residents	Robert Jeyes	1,585		
Labour	Terence Collins	689	29.5	+12.0
Labour	Charles Chown	684		
Labour	Michael O'Shea	625		
Turnout			37.6	−1.1
Registered electors		6,843		
Residents hold		Swing		
Residents hold		Swing		
Residents hold		Swing		

=== Eastbrook ===
Eastbrook (3)
Party	Candidate	Votes	%	±%
Labour	Richard Blackburn	1,347	58.9	+18.5
Labour	Frederick Tibble	1,314		
Labour	Lawrence Bunn	1,232		
Conservative	Royston Oliver	514	22.5	−12.8
Conservative	Kenneth Coombs	513		
Conservative	William Preston	450		
Alliance	David Kingaby	424	18.6	−5.7
Turnout			32.6	−1.2
Registered electors		7,196		
Labour hold		Swing		
Labour hold		Swing		
Labour hold		Swing		

=== Eastbury ===
Eastbury (2)
Party	Candidate	Votes	%	±%
Lib Dem Focus Team	Stephen Churchman	1,366	58.7	+35.2
Lib Dem Focus Team	David Smith	1,301		
Labour	Edith Bradley	963	41.3	−8.7
Labour	Patrick Manley	937		
Turnout			52.0	+14.1
Registered electors		4,735		
Lib Dem Focus Team gain from Labour		Swing		
Lib Dem Focus Team gain from Labour		Swing		

=== Fanshawe ===
Fanshawe (3)
Party	Candidate	Votes	%	±%
Labour	Frederick Jones	1,498	71.0	−19.8
Labour	John Thomas	1,326		
Labour	Ernest Turner	1,287		
Alliance	Susan Watson	514	24.4	N/A
Communist	Jeffrey Porter	97	4.6	−4.6
Turnout			29.3	+5.0
Registered electors		6,811		
Labour hold		Swing		
Labour hold		Swing		
Labour hold		Swing		

=== Gascoigne ===
Gascoigne (3)
Party	Candidate	Votes	%	±%
Lib Dem Focus Team	Alan Beadle	1,570	67.5	+13.5
Lib Dem Focus Team	Ronwen Beadle	1,565		
Lib Dem Focus Team	Alan Cooper	1,416		
Labour	Wendola Bomberg	756	32.5	−2.9
Labour	David Geary	716		
Labour	Nirmal Gill	631		
Turnout			40.1	−1.3
Registered electors		6,244		
Lib Dem Focus Team hold		Swing		
Lib Dem Focus Team hold		Swing		
Lib Dem Focus Team hold		Swing		

=== Goresbrook ===
Goresbrook (2)
Party	Candidate	Votes	%	±%
Labour	Alan Thomas	1,295	77.5	+13.3
Labour	Peter Robinson	1,235		
Alliance	Catherine Gavin	281	16.8	N/A
National Front	Jeannie Pearce	94	5.6	+1.1
National Front	Stephen Woodward	72		
Turnout			33.3	+5.1
Registered electors		5,018		
Labour hold		Swing		
Labour hold		Swing		

=== Heath ===
Heath (3)
Party	Candidate	Votes	%	±%
Labour	Charles Fairbrass	1,581	63.9	+4.2
Labour	Harry Tindell	1,438		
Labour	John Lawrence	1,397		
Conservative	Iris Johnson	459	18.6	+18.9
Conservative	Joan Preston	410		
Alliance	Mercy Bonner	385	15.6	N/A
Conservative	William Preston	375		
Communist	Helena Ott	49	2.0	−0.8
Turnout			32.2	−0.8
Registered electors		7,472		
Labour hold		Swing		
Labour hold		Swing		
Labour hold		Swing		

=== Longbridge ===
Longbridge (3)
Party	Candidate	Votes	%	±%
Conservative	Brian Cook	1,087	37.1	−16.8
Conservative	Janice Izzard	1,058		
Conservative	John Seaman	1,038		
Lib Dem Focus Team	Daniel Felton	989	33.8	+9.1
Lib Dem Focus Team	Susan Vickers	968		
Lib Dem Focus Team	Shirley Felton	962		
Labour	Frederick Jones	850	29.0	+7.5
Labour	Maureen Fitz-Henry	814		
Labour	Robin Dixon	805		
Turnout			42.7	+1.2
Registered electors		7,158		
Conservative hold		Swing		
Conservative hold		Swing		
Conservative hold		Swing		

=== Manor ===
Manor (2)
Party	Candidate	Votes	%	±%
Labour	James Mannering	1,184	70.7	+3.5
Labour	Alastair Hannah-Rogers	1,064		
Alliance	David Reed	260	15.5	N/A
Conservative	Richard Hall	231	13.8	−14.5
Conservative	Maureen Hall	221		
Turnout			33.7	+0.4
Registered electors		4,834		
Labour hold		Swing		
Labour hold		Swing		

=== Marks Gate ===
Marks Gate (1)
Party	Candidate	Votes	%	±%
Independent	Donald Pepper	457	52.2	−11.9
Labour	Margaret West	418	47.8	+11.9
Turnout			40.2	+3.7
Registered electors		2,178		
Independent hold		Swing		

=== Parsloes ===
Parsloes (2)
Party	Candidate	Votes	%	±%
Labour	Brian Walker	1,227	69.7	+21.4
Labour	John Dias-Broughton	1,225		
Alliance	Wendy Churchman	280	15.9	−5.7
Alliance	Mary Smith	258		
Conservative	Frederick Maloney	254	14.4	−15.7
Turnout			35.3	−0.6
Registered electors		5,201		
Labour hold		Swing		
Labour hold		Swing		

=== River ===
River (2)
Party	Candidate	Votes	%	±%
Labour	John Wainwright	859	43.3	+1.2
Independent Resident	Patricia Twomey	640	32.2	-7.0
Labour	Inder Jamu	621		
Alliance	Jean Key	247	12.4	N/A
Conservative	John Kinnie	240	12.1	−6.6
Turnout			31.4	−1.8
Registered electors		5,155		
Labour hold		Swing		
Labour hold		Swing		

=== Thames ===
Thames (2)
Party	Candidate	Votes	%	±%
Labour	George Shaw	1,522	83.2	+21.8
Labour	Royston Patient	1,457		
Alliance	Robert Porter	307	16.8	−3.4
Alliance	Dennis Keenan	300		
Turnout			39.6	−4.1
Registered electors		4,757		
Labour hold		Swing		
Labour hold		Swing		

=== Triptons ===
Triptons (3)
Party	Candidate	Votes	%	±%
Labour	George Brooker	1,421	71.1	+8.6
Labour	John Davis	1,417		
Labour	Cameron Geddes	1,144		
Alliance	Mark Kingswood	577	28.9	−5.0
Turnout			30.6	+4.6
Registered electors		7,046		
Labour hold		Swing		
Labour hold		Swing		
Labour hold		Swing		

=== Valence ===
Valence (3)
Party	Candidate	Votes	%	±%
Labour	Leonard Collins	1,418	68.1	−22.5
Labour	Jean Bruce	1,413		
Labour	Bryan Osborn	1,274		
Alliance	Raymond Langley	599	28.8	N/A
Communist	Alfred Ott	66	3.2	−6.2
Turnout			29.9	+6.3
Registered electors		7,079		
Labour hold		Swing		
Labour hold		Swing		
Labour hold		Swing		

=== Village ===
Village (3)
Party	Candidate	Votes	%	±%
Labour	Peter Bradley	1,498	72.7	+30.5
Labour	Alfred Rusha	1,414		
Labour	Ronald Whitbread	1,371		
Conservative	Leonard Johnson	563	27.3	−3.7
Conservative	Michael Ross	522		
Conservative	Terence Mallindine	500		
Turnout			30.8	−0.4
Registered electors		7,649		
Labour hold		Swing		
Labour hold		Swing		
Labour hold		Swing		

== By-elections between 1986 and 1990 ==
=== Gascoigne ===
Gascoigne by-election, 18 September 1986
Party	Candidate	Votes	%	±%
Liberal	Susan Vickers	1,450	73.8	+6.3
Labour	David Geary	466	23.7	−8.8
Conservative	Richard Hall	49	2.5	+2.5
Majority		984	50.1	N/A
Turnout			31.5	−8.6
Registered electors		6,264		
Liberal hold		Swing		

The by-election was called following the death of Cllr. Alan Beadle.

=== Fanshawe ===
Fanshawe by-election, 10 March 1988
Party	Candidate	Votes	%	±%
Labour	Raymond Parkin	910	77.3	+6.3
Conservative	William Preston	247	21.0	+21.0
Communist	Alfred Ott	20	1.7	−2.9
Majority		663	56.3	N/A
Turnout			17.7	−11.6
Registered electors		6,666		
Labour hold		Swing		

The by-election was called following the death of Cllr. Ernest Turner.

=== Marks Gate ===
Marks Gate by-election, 10 March 1988
Party	Candidate	Votes	%	±%
Labour	Maureen Worby	477	64.0	+16.2
Conservative	Terence Malladine	268	36.0	+36.0
Majority		209	28.0	N/A
Turnout			35.5	−4.7
Registered electors		2,098		
Labour gain from Independent		Swing		

The by-election was called following the resignation of Cllr. Donald Pepper.

=== River ===
River by-election, 3 November 1988
Party	Candidate	Votes	%	±%
Labour	Inder Jamu	542	49.2	+5.9
Conservative	Marcus Needham	294	26.7	+14.6
Liberal Democrats	Susan Bertram	266	24.1	+11.7
Majority		248	22.5	N/A
Turnout			21.7	−9.7
Registered electors		5,073		
Labour hold		Swing		

The by-election was called following the resignation of Cllr. Patricia Twomey.

=== Abbey ===
Abbey by-election, 8 June 1989
Party	Candidate	Votes	%	±%
Labour	Mohammad Fani	1,158	59.8	+4.9
Conservative	Nicholas Smith	524	27.1	+10.6
Liberal Democrats	Martin Taylor	253	13.1	−7.0
Majority		634	32.7	N/A
Turnout			28.6	−8.5
Registered electors		6,793		
Labour hold		Swing		

The by-election was called following the resignation of Cllr. Abdul Khokhar.
