= Whalebone (ward) =

Electoral ward in the London Borough of Barking and Dagenham

- Electoral ward for the Barking and Dagenham London Borough Council
- Whalebone ward boundaries since 2022
- Borough: Barking and Dagenham
- County: Greater London
- Population: 13,706 (2021) (Note: 2021 Census data reported for 2022 ward boundaries)
- Electorate: 8,830 (2022)
- Major settlements: Chadwell Heath
- Area: 1.634 square kilometres (0.631 sq mi)

Current electoral ward
- Created: 2002
- Number of members: 3
- Councillors: Andrew Achilleos; Mukhtar Yusuf; Rubina Siddiqui
- ONS code: 00ABGP (2002–2022)
- GSS code: E05000042 (2002–2022); E05014071 (2022–present)

Whalebone is an electoral ward in the London Borough of Barking and Dagenham. The ward was first used in the 2002 elections and was revised in 2022. It returns three councillors to Barking and Dagenham London Borough Council.

== List of councillors ==
Term	Councillor	Party
2002–2006	Albert Gibbs	Residents
2002–2010	John Denyer (Note: John Denyer changed parties in 2005)	Residents
2002–2010	John Denyer	Labour
2002–2010	Marie West	Labour
2006–2018	John White	Labour
2010–2014	Tony Perry	Labour
2010–2014; 2018–2022	Amardeep Jamu	Labour
2014–2018	Melanie Bartlett	Labour
2014–2018	Liam Smith	Labour
2018–2024	Glenda Paddle	Labour
2018–present	Andrew Achilleos	Labour
2022–present	Mukhtar Yusuf	Labour
2025–present	Rubina Siddiqui	Labour

== Summary ==
Councillors elected by party at each general borough election.

- Residents
- Labour

== Barking and Dagenham council elections since 2022 ==
There was a revision of ward boundaries in Barking and Dagenham in 2022.

=== 2026 election ===
The election took place on 7 May 2026.

2026 Barking and Dagenham London Borough Council election: Whalebone
Party	Candidate	Votes	%	±%
Labour	Rubina Siddiqui	1,289	42.0	N/A
Labour	Andrew Achilleos	1,254	40.9	−28.8
Labour	Mukhtar Yusuf	1,124	36.7	−22.8
Green	Nazrul Islam	817	26.6	N/A
Conservative	Dixant Patel	817	26.6	N/A
Reform	Adrian Gregory-Brown	796	26.0	N/A
Reform	Ramesh Boddukola	788	25.7	N/A
Conservative	Kenneth Odunze	381	12.4	N/A
Conservative	Ada Echedom	378	12.3	N/A
Reform	Olesea Pasat	332	10.8	N/A
Liberal Democrats	Herbert Munangatire	228	7.4	N/A
Turnout		3,066	33.2	+6.0
Registered electors		9,238		
Labour hold		Swing		
Labour hold		Swing		
Labour hold		Swing		

=== 2025 by-election ===
The by-election took place on 20 February 2025, following the death of Glenda Paddle.

2025 Whalebone by-election
Party	Candidate	Votes	%	±%
Labour	Rubina Siddiqui	625	54.92	
Conservative	Angelica Olawepo	287	25.22	
Green	Tope Olawoyin	117	10.28	
Liberal Democrats	Herbert Munangatire	109	9.58	
Turnout		1,138	12.33	
Labour hold		Swing		

=== 2022 election ===
The election took place on 5 May 2022.

2022 Barking and Dagenham London Borough Council election: Whalebone
Party	Candidate	Votes	%	±%
Labour	Glenda Paddle	1,698	30.7	N/A
Labour	Andrew Achilleos	1,687	30.5	N/A
Labour	Mukhtar Yusuf	1,441	26.0	N/A
Conservative	Subhash Nair	709	12.8	N/A
Turnout		2,421	27.2	N/A
Registered electors		8,830		
Labour win (new boundaries)				
Labour win (new boundaries)				
Labour win (new boundaries)				

== 2002–2022 Barking and Dagenham council elections ==
Whalebone ward boundaries from 2002 to 2022

There was a revision of ward boundaries in Barking and Dagenham in 2002.

=== 2018 election ===
The election took place on 3 May 2018.

2018 Barking and Dagenham London Borough Council election: Whalebone
Party	Candidate	Votes	%	±%
Labour	Glenda Paddle	1,850	25.7	N/A
Labour	Andrew Achilleos	1,804	25.1	N/A
Labour	Amardeep Jamu	1,768	24.6	N/A
Conservative	Maire Justice	631	8.8	N/A
Conservative	Richard Kelly	577	8.0	N/A
Conservative	Sunaina Mohan	557	7.7	N/A
Turnout		2,598	32.1	−5.5
Registered electors		8,085		
Labour hold		Swing		
Labour hold		Swing		
Labour hold		Swing		

=== 2014 election ===
The election took place on 22 May 2014.

2014 Barking and Dagenham London Borough Council election: Whalebone
Party	Candidate	Votes	%	±%
Labour	John White	1,625	23.6	N/A
Labour	Melanie Bartlett	1,620	23.6	N/A
Labour	Liam Smith	1,526	22.2	N/A
UKIP	Albert Bedwell	867	12.6	N/A
Conservative	Juhel Ahmed	515	7.5	N/A
Conservative	Jean Cockling	514	7.5	N/A
Liberal Democrats	William George	204	3.0	N/A
Turnout		2,796	37.6	−26.6
Registered electors		7,427		
Labour hold		Swing		
Labour hold		Swing		
Labour hold		Swing		

=== 2010 election ===
The election on 6 May 2010 took place on the same day as the United Kingdom general election.

2010 Barking and Dagenham London Borough Council election: Whalebone
Party	Candidate	Votes	%	±%
Labour	Tony Perry	2,200	45.2	−10.9
Labour	Amardeep Jamu	2,103		
Labour	John White	2,085		
Conservative	Christine Naylor	1,112	22.8	+21.1
Conservative	Emran Uddin	794		
Conservative	Wale Oguntona	788		
BNP	Robin Lillywhite	603	12.4	N/A
Independent	John Denyer	503	10.3	N/A
Liberal Democrats	Maxine London	450	9.2	N/A
Independent	Ingrid Robinson	350		
Independent	Zac Robinson	276		
Turnout		4,545	64.2	+27.7
Registered electors		7,076		
Labour hold		Swing		
Labour hold		Swing		
Labour hold		Swing		

=== 2006 election ===
The election took place on 4 May 2006.

2006 Barking and Dagenham London Borough Council election: Whalebone
Party	Candidate	Votes	%	±%
Labour	John Denyer	1,304	56.1	+15.5
Labour	Marie West	1,208		
Labour	John White	1,159		
Conservative	Paul Taylor	1,021	43.9	+26.2
Conservative	Christine Naylor	1,014		
Turnout		2,530	36.5	+10.3
Registered electors		6,922		
Labour gain from Residents		Swing		
Labour gain from Residents		Swing		
Labour hold		Swing		

=== 2002 election ===
The election took place on 2 May 2002.

2002 Barking and Dagenham London Borough Council election: Whalebone
Party	Candidate	Votes	%	±%
Residents	Albert Gibbs	762	41.7	N/A
Residents	John Denyer	755		
Labour	Marie West	740	40.5	N/A
Labour	Raymond Parkin	701		
Residents	Keith Woodcock	675		
Labour	Maureen Worby	667		
Conservative	Philip Grimmer	324	17.7	N/A
Conservative	Sylvia Grimmer	279		
Turnout		1,811	26.2	N/A
Registered electors		6,922		
Residents win (new seat)				
Residents win (new seat)				
Labour win (new seat)				
