= Northbury (ward) =

- Electoral ward for the Barking and Dagenham London Borough Council
- Northbury ward boundaries since 2022
- Borough: Barking and Dagenham
- County: Greater London
- Population: 13,080 (2021) (Note: 2021 Census data reported for 2022 ward boundaries)
- Electorate: 8,545 (2022)
- Major settlements: Barking
- Area: 0.9494 square kilometres (0.3666 sq mi)

Current electoral ward
- Created: 2022
- Number of members: 3
- Councillors: Saima Ashraf; Giasuddin Miah; Summya Sohaib
- Created from: Abbey
- GSS code: E05014066

Northbury is an electoral ward in the London Borough of Barking and Dagenham. The ward was first used in the 2022 elections. It returns three councillors to Barking and Dagenham London Borough Council.

== List of councillors ==
Term	Councillor	Party
2022–present	Saima Ashraf	Labour
2022–2024	Darren Rodwell	Labour
2022–present	Giasuddin Miah	Labour
2024–2026	Val Masson	Labour
2026–present	Summya Sohaib	Labour

== Barking and Dagenham council elections ==
=== 2026 election ===
The election took place on 7 May 2026

2026 Barking and Dagenham London Borough Council election: Northbury
Party	Candidate	Votes	%
Labour	Saima Ashraf	1,146	14.70
Labour	Giasuddin Miah	1,003	12.87
Labour	Summya Sohaib	950	12.19
Green	Curtis Cooper	940	12.06
Green	Khawar Nasim	889	11.40
Green	Aiden Nicholls	868	11.14
Conservative	Shibli Rahman	342	4.39
Reform	Scott Cleaver	328	4.21
Conservative	Ahad Hossain	326	4.18
Conservative	Rasel Miha	309	3.96
Reform	Paul Mateiu	289	3.71
Reform	Lesley McNab	276	3.54
Liberal Democrats	Mehnaz Ali	129	1.65
Turnout			30.30%
Labour hold			
Labour hold			
Labour hold			

=== 2024 by-election ===
The by-election took place on 28 November 2024, following the resignation of Darren Rodwell.

2024 Northbury by-election
Party	Candidate	Votes	%	±%
Labour	Val Masson	561		
Green	Simon Ronald Anthony	161		
Reform	Ryan Edwards	101		
Conservative	Angelica Olawepo	100		
Liberal Democrats	Olumide Adeyefa	49		
Turnout				
Labour hold		Swing		

=== 2022 election ===
The election took place on 5 May 2022.

2022 Barking and Dagenham London Borough Council election: Northbury
Party	Candidate	Votes	%	±%
Labour	Saima Ashraf	1,500	27.9	N/A
Labour	Darren Rodwell	1,398	26.0	N/A
Labour	Giasuddin Miah	1,364	25.4	N/A
Conservative	Tariq Saeed	363	6.8	N/A
Green	Simon Anthony	317	5.9	N/A
Green	Alex Hollis	221	4.1	N/A
Green	Jon Wright	209	3.9	N/A
Turnout		2,025	23.6	N/A
Registered electors		8,545		
Labour win (new seat)				
Labour win (new seat)				
Labour win (new seat)				
