= 2026 Barking and Dagenham London Borough Council election =

2026 English local government election

- 7 May 2026

All 51 seats to Barking & Dagenham London Borough Council 26 seats needed for a majority
- Registered: 151,480
- Turnout: 51,395; 33.93% (▲9.44%)
	First party	Second party	Third party
Leader	Dominic Twomey	Ben Suter	Moin Quadri
Party	Labour	Reform	Green
Leader's seat	Eastbury (moved from Gascoigne)	Ran in Eastbrook and Rush Green (won)	Gascoigne (moved from Goresbrook)
Last election	51 seats, 80.0%	Did not stand	0 seats, 1.3%
Seats after	38	9	4
Seat change	▼13	▲9	▲4
Popular vote	50,156	35,634	27,282
Percentage	37.8	26.8	20.5
Swing	▼42.2%	▲26.8%	▲19.2%
- Map of the results of the 2026 Barking and Dagenham council election. Labour in red, Reform in light blue and Greens in green.
Leader before election
Dominic Twomey
Labour
Leader after election
Dominic Twomey
Labour

The 2026 Barking and Dagenham London Borough Council election took place on 7 May 2026, as part of the 2026 United Kingdom local elections. The election took place alongside local elections in the other London boroughs. All seats were up for election. The Labour Party retained the Council, but lost 13 seats. Reform UK won 9 seats, its first seats in the borough. It was Reform's 2nd best performance in London in terms of seats, and 3rd best performance in terms of votes. The Green Party won 4 seats. This was the first election since 2006 in which opposition candidates were elected in a regular election, and the first time since the 2008 Chadwell Heath by-election in which a party other than Labour was elected in Barking and Dagenham. This is the fifth election in a row in which the Conservative Party failed to win a seat.

== Background ==
Result of the 2022 borough election

The thirty-two London boroughs were established in 1965 by the London Government Act 1963. They are the principal authorities in Greater London and have responsibilities including education, housing, planning, highways, social services, libraries, recreation, waste, environmental health and revenue collection. Some of the powers are shared with the Greater London Authority, which also manages passenger transport, police and fire.

Barking and Dagenham has been controlled by the Labour Party since its establishment. The Conservatives, Liberal Democrats, British National Party, independents and residents associations have also held seats on the borough. In the most recent four elections in 2010, 2014, 2018 and 2022, all fifty-one seats were won by the Labour Party. The incumbent leader of the council is the Labour councillor Dominic Twomey, who has held that position since 2024.

In September 2025, three Labour councillors left the party to join the Green Party of England and Wales. Lynda Rice, who had been elected as a Labour councillor, defected to the Conservatives later in the same month.

== Electoral process ==
Barking and Dagenham, as is the case all other London borough councils, elects all of its councillors at once every four years, with the previous election having taken place in 2022. The election takes place by multi-member first-past-the-post voting, with each ward being represented by two or three councillors. Electors will have as many votes as there are councillors to be elected in their ward, with the top two or three being elected.

All registered electors (British, Irish, Commonwealth and European Union citizens) living in London aged 18 or over are entitled to vote in the election. People who live at two addresses in different councils, such as university students with different term-time and holiday addresses, are entitled to be registered for and vote in elections in both local authorities. Voting in-person at polling stations takes place from 7:00 to 22:00 on election day, and voters are able to apply for postal votes or proxy votes in advance of the election.

== Previous council composition ==
After 2022 election		Before 2026 election		After 2026 election	
Party	Seats	Party	Seats	Party	Seats
Labour	51	Labour	47	Labour	38
		Green	3	Reform	9
		Conservative	1	Green	4

== Summary ==
Ward	Incumbent			Results	Candidates
Ward	Councillors	Party	First elected	Results	Candidates
Abbey	Regina Rahman	Labour	2022	Incumbent re-elected.	▌ ✓ Manzoor Hussain (Labour) 38.42%; ▌ ✓ Regina Rahman (Labour) 36.74%; ▌Shazia Majeed (Green) 33.28%; ▌Verinder Singh (Green) 32.64%; ▌Natasha Caulfield (Reform) 13.34%; ▌Eshan Attiq (Conservatives) 12.70%; ▌Craig Pullen (Reform) 11.33%; ▌Kazi Reza (Conservatives) 11.09%; ▌Malik Rabbani (Liberal Democrats) 4.18%
Abbey	Manzoor Hussain	Labour	2010 2014 (retired) 2022	Incumbent re-elected.	▌ ✓ Manzoor Hussain (Labour) 38.42%; ▌ ✓ Regina Rahman (Labour) 36.74%; ▌Shazia Majeed (Green) 33.28%; ▌Verinder Singh (Green) 32.64%; ▌Natasha Caulfield (Reform) 13.34%; ▌Eshan Attiq (Conservatives) 12.70%; ▌Craig Pullen (Reform) 11.33%; ▌Kazi Reza (Conservatives) 11.09%; ▌Malik Rabbani (Liberal Democrats) 4.18%
Alibon	John Dulwich	Labour	2022	Incumbent Retired. Labour Hold.	▌ ✓ Dorothy Akwaboah (Labour) 42.86%; ▌ ✓ Muazzam Sandhu (Labour) 39.06%; ▌Tracey Sullivan-Sparks (Reform) 38.58%; ▌Nick Vandyke (Reform) 36.17%; ▌Ikem Chinedu (Conservatives) 12.41%; ▌Abul Khayer (Conservatives) 11.66%; ▌Brianne Wooding (Liberal Democrats) 9.57%
Alibon	Dorothy Akwaboah	Labour	2018 (Note: Dorothy Akwaboah was elected in 2018 to Parsloes Ward. She moved ward in 2022)	Incumbent re-elected.	▌ ✓ Dorothy Akwaboah (Labour) 42.86%; ▌ ✓ Muazzam Sandhu (Labour) 39.06%; ▌Tracey Sullivan-Sparks (Reform) 38.58%; ▌Nick Vandyke (Reform) 36.17%; ▌Ikem Chinedu (Conservatives) 12.41%; ▌Abul Khayer (Conservatives) 11.66%; ▌Brianne Wooding (Liberal Democrats) 9.57%
Barking Riverside	Josie Channer	Labour	2010	Incumbent re-elected.	▌ ✓ Josie Channer (Labour) 39.52%: ▌ ✓ Cameron Geddes (Labour) 39.01%; ▌ ✓ Marion Lesley Hull (Labour) 34.98%; ▌Victoria Hornby (Green) 34.04%; ▌Mizanur Rahman (Green) 33.53%; ▌Godfrey Kizito Sekisonge (Green) 28.39%; ▌Jim Holland (Reform) 16.79%; ▌Ion Talambuta (Reform) 13.98%; ▌Ion Uraschi (Reform) 13.77%; ▌Mohammad Gias Uddin (Conservatives) 7.61%; ▌Helal Talukder (Conservatives) 7.18%; ▌Musammat Meherun Nessa Khanam (Conservatives) 6.20%; ▌Gabriel Abe (Christian Peoples Alliance) 6.08%; ▌Syed I Kazmi (Liberal Democrats) 3.65%
Barking Riverside	Cameron Geddes	Labour	1986 2006 (retired) 2010	Incumbent re-elected.	
Barking Riverside	Victoria Hornby	Green (Note: Victoria Hornby was elected as a Labour Councillor in 2022. She defected to the Greens in 2025.)	2022	Incumbent lost re-election. Labour Gain.	
Beam	Donna Lumsden	Labour	2018	Incumbent re-elected.	▌ ✓ Muhib Chowdhury (Labour) 47.01%; ▌ ✓ Donna Lumsden (Labour) 43.88%; ▌ ✓ Glen Spoor (Labour) 39.27%; ▌Anish Samuel (Reform) 24.42%; ▌Nina Sontea (Reform) 23.51%; ▌Ionel Popa (Green) 22.77%; ▌Mariana Suciu (Reform) 22.77%; ▌George Elebiju (Liberal Democrats) 12.86%; ▌Mehreen Iqbal (Conservatives) 10.76%; ▌Taye Ishola (Conservatives) 10.59%; ▌Joseph Omorere (Conservatives) 9.16%
Beam	Muhib Chowdhury	Labour	2022	Incumbent re-elected.	▌ ✓ Muhib Chowdhury (Labour) 47.01%; ▌ ✓ Donna Lumsden (Labour) 43.88%; ▌ ✓ Glen Spoor (Labour) 39.27%; ▌Anish Samuel (Reform) 24.42%; ▌Nina Sontea (Reform) 23.51%; ▌Ionel Popa (Green) 22.77%; ▌Mariana Suciu (Reform) 22.77%; ▌George Elebiju (Liberal Democrats) 12.86%; ▌Mehreen Iqbal (Conservatives) 10.76%; ▌Taye Ishola (Conservatives) 10.59%; ▌Joseph Omorere (Conservatives) 9.16%
Beam	Muazzam Sandhu	Labour	2022	Incumbent ran in Alibon. New Councillor elected. Labour Hold.	▌ ✓ Muhib Chowdhury (Labour) 47.01%; ▌ ✓ Donna Lumsden (Labour) 43.88%; ▌ ✓ Glen Spoor (Labour) 39.27%; ▌Anish Samuel (Reform) 24.42%; ▌Nina Sontea (Reform) 23.51%; ▌Ionel Popa (Green) 22.77%; ▌Mariana Suciu (Reform) 22.77%; ▌George Elebiju (Liberal Democrats) 12.86%; ▌Mehreen Iqbal (Conservatives) 10.76%; ▌Taye Ishola (Conservatives) 10.59%; ▌Joseph Omorere (Conservatives) 9.16%
Becontree	Edna Fergus	Labour	2014 (Note: Edna Fergus was elected in 2014 to Eastbrook Ward. She moved ward in 2018)	Incumbent re-elected.	▌ ✓ Edna Fergus (Labour) 37.56%; ▌ ✓ Muhammad Saleem (Labour) 34.91%; ▌Ann Clark (Reform) 26.54%; ▌Dave Godfrey (Reform) 25.64%; ▌Masood Pasha (Green) 21.20%; ▌Mary-Ann Murphy (Green) 17.26%; ▌Muhammad Ahmadzai (Independent) 11.97%; ▌Mohammed Islam (Conservatives) 6.88%; ▌Minhaz Khan (Conservatives) 6.32%; ▌Mohammad Yaqoob (Liberal Democrats) 2.31%
Becontree	Muhammad Saleem	Labour	2018	Incumbent re-elected.	▌ ✓ Edna Fergus (Labour) 37.56%; ▌ ✓ Muhammad Saleem (Labour) 34.91%; ▌Ann Clark (Reform) 26.54%; ▌Dave Godfrey (Reform) 25.64%; ▌Masood Pasha (Green) 21.20%; ▌Mary-Ann Murphy (Green) 17.26%; ▌Muhammad Ahmadzai (Independent) 11.97%; ▌Mohammed Islam (Conservatives) 6.88%; ▌Minhaz Khan (Conservatives) 6.32%; ▌Mohammad Yaqoob (Liberal Democrats) 2.31%
Chadwell Heath	Sade Bright	Labour	2014	Incumbent re-elected.	▌ ✓ Sade Bright (Labour) 37.44%; ▌ ✓ Simon Perry (Labour) 37.37%; ▌ ✓ Michel Pongo (Labour) 32.73%; ▌Paul Hewson (Reform) 27.59%; ▌Vivian Ebal (Green) 26.34%; ▌Debbie Rosaman (Green) 25.55%; ▌Fuad Ashraf (Reform) 24.04%; ▌Muhammad Hamza (Reform) 23.25%; ▌Kamini Sharma (Conservatives) 11.99%; ▌Arinze Nwanna (Conservatives) 10.08%; ▌Mohib Shah (Liberal Democrats) 9.55%; ▌Anonta Sutradhar (Conservatives) 9.25%
Chadwell Heath	Simon Perry	Labour	2018	Incumbent re-elected.	▌ ✓ Sade Bright (Labour) 37.44%; ▌ ✓ Simon Perry (Labour) 37.37%; ▌ ✓ Michel Pongo (Labour) 32.73%; ▌Paul Hewson (Reform) 27.59%; ▌Vivian Ebal (Green) 26.34%; ▌Debbie Rosaman (Green) 25.55%; ▌Fuad Ashraf (Reform) 24.04%; ▌Muhammad Hamza (Reform) 23.25%; ▌Kamini Sharma (Conservatives) 11.99%; ▌Arinze Nwanna (Conservatives) 10.08%; ▌Mohib Shah (Liberal Democrats) 9.55%; ▌Anonta Sutradhar (Conservatives) 9.25%
Chadwell Heath	Michael Pongo	Labour	2022	Incumbent re-elected.	▌ ✓ Sade Bright (Labour) 37.44%; ▌ ✓ Simon Perry (Labour) 37.37%; ▌ ✓ Michel Pongo (Labour) 32.73%; ▌Paul Hewson (Reform) 27.59%; ▌Vivian Ebal (Green) 26.34%; ▌Debbie Rosaman (Green) 25.55%; ▌Fuad Ashraf (Reform) 24.04%; ▌Muhammad Hamza (Reform) 23.25%; ▌Kamini Sharma (Conservatives) 11.99%; ▌Arinze Nwanna (Conservatives) 10.08%; ▌Mohib Shah (Liberal Democrats) 9.55%; ▌Anonta Sutradhar (Conservatives) 9.25%
Eastbrook and Rush Green	Princess Bright	Labour	2018	Incumbent lost re-election. Reform Gain.	▌ ✓ Ron Emin (Reform) 38.17%; ▌ ✓ Ben Suter (Reform) 37.31%; ▌Princess Bright (Labour) 30.68%; ▌Amimul Tanim (Labour) 28.68%; ▌Djena Balde (Green) 16.63%; ▌Sheikh Nadeem (Green) 15.69%; ▌Neil Hallewell (Conservatives) 8.79%; ▌James Tyler (Conservatives) 8.43%; ▌Lewis Holmes (Independent) 5.61%; ▌Ashlea Wane (Independent) 3.06%; ▌ Nomsa Munangatire (Liberal Democrats) 2.82%
Eastbrook and Rush Green	Tony Ramsay	Labour	2010	Incumbent Retired. Reform Gain.	▌ ✓ Ron Emin (Reform) 38.17%; ▌ ✓ Ben Suter (Reform) 37.31%; ▌Princess Bright (Labour) 30.68%; ▌Amimul Tanim (Labour) 28.68%; ▌Djena Balde (Green) 16.63%; ▌Sheikh Nadeem (Green) 15.69%; ▌Neil Hallewell (Conservatives) 8.79%; ▌James Tyler (Conservatives) 8.43%; ▌Lewis Holmes (Independent) 5.61%; ▌Ashlea Wane (Independent) 3.06%; ▌ Nomsa Munangatire (Liberal Democrats) 2.82%
Eastbury	Emily Rodwell	Labour	2018	Incumbent Retired. Labour Hold.	▌ ✓ Mohammed Khan (Labour) 31.62%: ▌ ✓ Dominic Twomey (Labour) 30.34%; ▌ ✓ Maureen Worby (Labour) 29.23%; ▌Mohammod Uddin (Green) 28.26%; ▌Costel Filipescu (Reform) 25.70%; ▌Zinaida Birlea (Reform) 25.22%; ▌Romas Bugaitis (Green) 24.94%; ▌Sisir Das (Reform) 24.48%; ▌Pinar Polat (Green) 23.12%; ▌Monzour Ahamed (Conservatives) 12.66%; ▌Joshua Yousaf (Conservatives) 9.59%; ▌Azizur Rahman (Conservatives) 9.35%; ▌Elizabeth Makinde (Liberal Democrats) 6.45%
Eastbury	Mohammed Khan	Labour	2018 (Note: Mohammed Khan was elected in 2018 to Chadwell Heath Ward. He moved ward in 2022)	Incumbent re-elected.	▌ ✓ Mohammed Khan (Labour) 31.62%: ▌ ✓ Dominic Twomey (Labour) 30.34%; ▌ ✓ Maureen Worby (Labour) 29.23%; ▌Mohammod Uddin (Green) 28.26%; ▌Costel Filipescu (Reform) 25.70%; ▌Zinaida Birlea (Reform) 25.22%; ▌Romas Bugaitis (Green) 24.94%; ▌Sisir Das (Reform) 24.48%; ▌Pinar Polat (Green) 23.12%; ▌Monzour Ahamed (Conservatives) 12.66%; ▌Joshua Yousaf (Conservatives) 9.59%; ▌Azizur Rahman (Conservatives) 9.35%; ▌Elizabeth Makinde (Liberal Democrats) 6.45%
Eastbury	Faraaz Shaukat	Labour	2014	Incumbent Retired. Labour Hold.	▌ ✓ Mohammed Khan (Labour) 31.62%: ▌ ✓ Dominic Twomey (Labour) 30.34%; ▌ ✓ Maureen Worby (Labour) 29.23%; ▌Mohammod Uddin (Green) 28.26%; ▌Costel Filipescu (Reform) 25.70%; ▌Zinaida Birlea (Reform) 25.22%; ▌Romas Bugaitis (Green) 24.94%; ▌Sisir Das (Reform) 24.48%; ▌Pinar Polat (Green) 23.12%; ▌Monzour Ahamed (Conservatives) 12.66%; ▌Joshua Yousaf (Conservatives) 9.59%; ▌Azizur Rahman (Conservatives) 9.35%; ▌Elizabeth Makinde (Liberal Democrats) 6.45%
Gascoigne	Alison Cormack	Labour	2022	Incumbent re-elected.	▌ ✓ Moin Quadri (Green) 38.51%; ▌ ✓ Nazrul Kazi (Green) 37.55%; ▌ ✓ Alison Cormack (Labour) 34.52%; ▌Ashwin Balluck (Labour) 34.44%; ▌Kaied Ghiyatha (Labour) 31.60%; ▌Silvia Rotaru (Green) 30.72%; ▌Abedin Kazi (Conservatives) 12.66%; ▌Vera Botnari (Reform) 10.19%; ▌Adriana Saldana (Conservatives) 9.59%; ▌Mihaela Melinte (Reform) 9.43%; ▌Lilufar Begum (Conservatives) 9.35%; ▌Tadas Karkauskas (Reform) 8.99%; ▌Qasim Tahir (Workers Party) 8.55%; ▌Ayfer Cebi (Liberal Democrats) 3.36%
Gascoigne	Jack Shaw	Labour	2022	Incumbent retired. Green Gain.	▌ ✓ Moin Quadri (Green) 38.51%; ▌ ✓ Nazrul Kazi (Green) 37.55%; ▌ ✓ Alison Cormack (Labour) 34.52%; ▌Ashwin Balluck (Labour) 34.44%; ▌Kaied Ghiyatha (Labour) 31.60%; ▌Silvia Rotaru (Green) 30.72%; ▌Abedin Kazi (Conservatives) 12.66%; ▌Vera Botnari (Reform) 10.19%; ▌Adriana Saldana (Conservatives) 9.59%; ▌Mihaela Melinte (Reform) 9.43%; ▌Lilufar Begum (Conservatives) 9.35%; ▌Tadas Karkauskas (Reform) 8.99%; ▌Qasim Tahir (Workers Party) 8.55%; ▌Ayfer Cebi (Liberal Democrats) 3.36%
Gascoigne	Dominic Twomey	Labour	2010	Incumbent ran in Eastbury. New councillor elected. Green Gain.	▌ ✓ Moin Quadri (Green) 38.51%; ▌ ✓ Nazrul Kazi (Green) 37.55%; ▌ ✓ Alison Cormack (Labour) 34.52%; ▌Ashwin Balluck (Labour) 34.44%; ▌Kaied Ghiyatha (Labour) 31.60%; ▌Silvia Rotaru (Green) 30.72%; ▌Abedin Kazi (Conservatives) 12.66%; ▌Vera Botnari (Reform) 10.19%; ▌Adriana Saldana (Conservatives) 9.59%; ▌Mihaela Melinte (Reform) 9.43%; ▌Lilufar Begum (Conservatives) 9.35%; ▌Tadas Karkauskas (Reform) 8.99%; ▌Qasim Tahir (Workers Party) 8.55%; ▌Ayfer Cebi (Liberal Democrats) 3.36%
Goresbrook	Paul Robinson	Labour	2018 (Note: Paul Robinson was elected in 2018 to Alibon Ward. He moved ward in 2022)	Incumbent lost re-election. Reform Gain	▌ ✓ George Miller (Reform) 42.04%; ▌ ✓ Caleb Van Ryneveld (Reform) 37.57%; ▌ ✓ Manjeet Nandra (Reform) 36.90%; ▌Irma Freeborn (Labour) 28.07%; ▌Paul Robinson (Labour) 26.27%; ▌Nassaba Guiba (Labour) 24.79%; ▌Sheikh Ahmed (Green) 21.32%; ▌Poly Ara (Green) 17.98%; ▌Colin Bowman (Conservatives) 14.26%; ▌Mohammed Islam (Conservatives) 11.88%; ▌Sharfaraz Raj (Conservatives) 10.60%; ▌Muhammad Awan (Liberal Democrats) 5.46%
Goresbrook	Irma Freeborn	Labour	2014	Incumbent lost re-election. Reform Gain	▌ ✓ George Miller (Reform) 42.04%; ▌ ✓ Caleb Van Ryneveld (Reform) 37.57%; ▌ ✓ Manjeet Nandra (Reform) 36.90%; ▌Irma Freeborn (Labour) 28.07%; ▌Paul Robinson (Labour) 26.27%; ▌Nassaba Guiba (Labour) 24.79%; ▌Sheikh Ahmed (Green) 21.32%; ▌Poly Ara (Green) 17.98%; ▌Colin Bowman (Conservatives) 14.26%; ▌Mohammed Islam (Conservatives) 11.88%; ▌Sharfaraz Raj (Conservatives) 10.60%; ▌Muhammad Awan (Liberal Democrats) 5.46%
Goresbrook	Moin Quadri	Green (Note: Moin Quadri was elected as a Labour Councillor in 2022. He defected to the Greens in 2025.)	2014	Incumbent ran in Gascoigne. New councillor elected. Reform Gain.	▌ ✓ George Miller (Reform) 42.04%; ▌ ✓ Caleb Van Ryneveld (Reform) 37.57%; ▌ ✓ Manjeet Nandra (Reform) 36.90%; ▌Irma Freeborn (Labour) 28.07%; ▌Paul Robinson (Labour) 26.27%; ▌Nassaba Guiba (Labour) 24.79%; ▌Sheikh Ahmed (Green) 21.32%; ▌Poly Ara (Green) 17.98%; ▌Colin Bowman (Conservatives) 14.26%; ▌Mohammed Islam (Conservatives) 11.88%; ▌Sharfaraz Raj (Conservatives) 10.60%; ▌Muhammad Awan (Liberal Democrats) 5.46%
Heath	Harriet Spoor	Labour	2023 (by-election)	Incumbent re-elected.	▌ ✓ Ingrid Robinson(Labour) 48.09%; ▌ ✓ Harriet Spoor (Labour) 44.28%; ▌Lee Willoughby (Reform) 33.20%; ▌Sunil Idiculla (Reform) 30.24%; ▌Abdullah Alam (Conservatives) 12.54%; ▌Naveed Akbar (Liberal Democrats) 11.28%; ▌Corine Mengalle (Conservatives) 8.38%
Heath	Ingrid Robinson	Labour	2018	Incumbent re-elected.	▌ ✓ Ingrid Robinson(Labour) 48.09%; ▌ ✓ Harriet Spoor (Labour) 44.28%; ▌Lee Willoughby (Reform) 33.20%; ▌Sunil Idiculla (Reform) 30.24%; ▌Abdullah Alam (Conservatives) 12.54%; ▌Naveed Akbar (Liberal Democrats) 11.28%; ▌Corine Mengalle (Conservatives) 8.38%
Longbridge	Rocky Gill	Labour	2006	Incumbent re-elected.	▌ ✓ Faruk Choudhury (Green) 40.29%; ▌ ✓ Rocky Gill (Labour) 35.57%; ▌ ✓ Mashkura Mazid (Green) 30.89%; ▌Emran Chowdhury (Labour) 28.57%; ▌Tim Hunt (Green) 27.61%; ▌Val Masson (Labour) 23.13%; ▌Mohammed Hussain (Independent) 22.12%; ▌Shah Rahman (Conservatives) 20.98%; ▌Marin Adam (Reform) 11.10%; ▌Chris Fennessy (Reform) 10.49%; ▌ Lynda Rice (Conservatives) 10.08%; ▌Alexandru Suciu (Reform) 8.87%; ▌ Joe McNicholl (Conservatives) 8.77%; ▌Ghulam Rasool (Liberal Democrats) 3.90%
Longbridge	Faruk Choudhury	Green (Note: Faruk Choudhury was elected as a Labour Councillor in 2014, 2018 and 2022. He defected to the Greens in 2025.)	2014	Incumbent re-elected.	▌ ✓ Faruk Choudhury (Green) 40.29%; ▌ ✓ Rocky Gill (Labour) 35.57%; ▌ ✓ Mashkura Mazid (Green) 30.89%; ▌Emran Chowdhury (Labour) 28.57%; ▌Tim Hunt (Green) 27.61%; ▌Val Masson (Labour) 23.13%; ▌Mohammed Hussain (Independent) 22.12%; ▌Shah Rahman (Conservatives) 20.98%; ▌Marin Adam (Reform) 11.10%; ▌Chris Fennessy (Reform) 10.49%; ▌ Lynda Rice (Conservatives) 10.08%; ▌Alexandru Suciu (Reform) 8.87%; ▌ Joe McNicholl (Conservatives) 8.77%; ▌Ghulam Rasool (Liberal Democrats) 3.90%
Longbridge	Lynda Rice	Conservative (Note: Lynda Rice was elected as a Labour Councillor in 2010, 2014, 2018 and 2022. She defected to the Conservatives in 2025.)	2010	Incumbent lost re-election. Green Gain.	▌ ✓ Faruk Choudhury (Green) 40.29%; ▌ ✓ Rocky Gill (Labour) 35.57%; ▌ ✓ Mashkura Mazid (Green) 30.89%; ▌Emran Chowdhury (Labour) 28.57%; ▌Tim Hunt (Green) 27.61%; ▌Val Masson (Labour) 23.13%; ▌Mohammed Hussain (Independent) 22.12%; ▌Shah Rahman (Conservatives) 20.98%; ▌Marin Adam (Reform) 11.10%; ▌Chris Fennessy (Reform) 10.49%; ▌ Lynda Rice (Conservatives) 10.08%; ▌Alexandru Suciu (Reform) 8.87%; ▌ Joe McNicholl (Conservatives) 8.77%; ▌Ghulam Rasool (Liberal Democrats) 3.90%
Mayesbrook	Summya Sohaib	Labour	2023 (by-election)	Incumbent ran in Northbury. New Councillor elected. Labour Hold.	▌ ✓ Shamsul Azam (Labour) 36.00%: ▌ ✓ Kashif Haroon (Labour) 34.39%; ▌ ✓ Faiza Noreen (Labour) 33.68%; ▌Andy McNab (Reform) 31.47%; ▌Ray Anderson (Reform) 31.16%; ▌Bijoy Johnson (Reform) 31.16%; ▌Raju Ahamad (Green) 23.09%; ▌Juliano Nunes (Green) 21.90%; ▌Syed Roomy (Green) 19.40%; ▌Shahana Choudhury (Conservatives) 7.52%; ▌Tamanna Mirza (Conservatives) 6.82%; ▌Mizanur Rahman (Conservatives) 5.94%; ▌George Elebiju (Liberal Democrats) 3.90%
Mayesbrook	Kashif Haroon	Labour	2014	Incumbent re-elected.	▌ ✓ Shamsul Azam (Labour) 36.00%: ▌ ✓ Kashif Haroon (Labour) 34.39%; ▌ ✓ Faiza Noreen (Labour) 33.68%; ▌Andy McNab (Reform) 31.47%; ▌Ray Anderson (Reform) 31.16%; ▌Bijoy Johnson (Reform) 31.16%; ▌Raju Ahamad (Green) 23.09%; ▌Juliano Nunes (Green) 21.90%; ▌Syed Roomy (Green) 19.40%; ▌Shahana Choudhury (Conservatives) 7.52%; ▌Tamanna Mirza (Conservatives) 6.82%; ▌Mizanur Rahman (Conservatives) 5.94%; ▌George Elebiju (Liberal Democrats) 3.90%
Mayesbrook	Ade Oluwole	Labour	2018	Incumbent Retired. Labour Hold.	▌ ✓ Shamsul Azam (Labour) 36.00%: ▌ ✓ Kashif Haroon (Labour) 34.39%; ▌ ✓ Faiza Noreen (Labour) 33.68%; ▌Andy McNab (Reform) 31.47%; ▌Ray Anderson (Reform) 31.16%; ▌Bijoy Johnson (Reform) 31.16%; ▌Raju Ahamad (Green) 23.09%; ▌Juliano Nunes (Green) 21.90%; ▌Syed Roomy (Green) 19.40%; ▌Shahana Choudhury (Conservatives) 7.52%; ▌Tamanna Mirza (Conservatives) 6.82%; ▌Mizanur Rahman (Conservatives) 5.94%; ▌George Elebiju (Liberal Democrats) 3.90%
Northbury	Saima Ashraf	Labour	2010 (Note: Saima Ashraf was elected in 2010, 2014 and 2018 to Gascoigne Ward. He moved ward in 2022)	Incumbent re-elected.	▌ ✓ Saima Ashraf (Labour) 41.61%; ▌ ✓ Giasuddin Miah (Labour) 36.42%; ▌ ✓ Summya Sohaib (Labour) 34.50%; ▌Curtis Cooper (Green) 34.13%; ▌Khawar Nasim (Green) 32.28%; ▌Aiden Nicholls (Green) 31.52%; ▌Shibli Rahman (Conservatives) 12.42%; ▌Scott Cleaver (Reform) 11.91%; ▌Ahad Hossain (Conservatives) 11.84%; ▌Rasel Miha (Conservatives) 11.22%; ▌Paul Mateiu (Reform) 10.49%; ▌Lesley McNab (Reform) 10.02%; ▌Mehnaz Ali (Liberal Democrats) 4.68%
Northbury	Val Masson	Labour	2024 (by-election)	Incumbent ran in Longbridge. New Councillor elected. Labour Hold.	▌ ✓ Saima Ashraf (Labour) 41.61%; ▌ ✓ Giasuddin Miah (Labour) 36.42%; ▌ ✓ Summya Sohaib (Labour) 34.50%; ▌Curtis Cooper (Green) 34.13%; ▌Khawar Nasim (Green) 32.28%; ▌Aiden Nicholls (Green) 31.52%; ▌Shibli Rahman (Conservatives) 12.42%; ▌Scott Cleaver (Reform) 11.91%; ▌Ahad Hossain (Conservatives) 11.84%; ▌Rasel Miha (Conservatives) 11.22%; ▌Paul Mateiu (Reform) 10.49%; ▌Lesley McNab (Reform) 10.02%; ▌Mehnaz Ali (Liberal Democrats) 4.68%
Northbury	Giasuddin Miah	Labour	2014 (Note: Giasuddin Miah was elected in 2014 and 2018 to Abbey Ward. He moved ward in 2022)	Incumbent re-elected.	▌ ✓ Saima Ashraf (Labour) 41.61%; ▌ ✓ Giasuddin Miah (Labour) 36.42%; ▌ ✓ Summya Sohaib (Labour) 34.50%; ▌Curtis Cooper (Green) 34.13%; ▌Khawar Nasim (Green) 32.28%; ▌Aiden Nicholls (Green) 31.52%; ▌Shibli Rahman (Conservatives) 12.42%; ▌Scott Cleaver (Reform) 11.91%; ▌Ahad Hossain (Conservatives) 11.84%; ▌Rasel Miha (Conservatives) 11.22%; ▌Paul Mateiu (Reform) 10.49%; ▌Lesley McNab (Reform) 10.02%; ▌Mehnaz Ali (Liberal Democrats) 4.68%
Parsloes	Chris Rice	Labour	2010	Incumbent retired. Reform Gain	▌ ✓ Billy Edmunds (Reform) 35.48%; ▌ ✓ Alexandra Arnautu (Reform) 34.88%; ▌ ✓ Ripon Sheikh (Reform) 31.16%; ▌Robert Jones (Labour) 27.53%; ▌Jeorgina Soares (Labour) 26.88%; ▌Taiwo Bodunrin (Green) 25.63%; ▌Elizabeth Kangethe (Labour) 25.63%; ▌Syful Islam (Green) 25.06%; ▌Marzia Khatun (Green) 22.27%; ▌Sonjoy Roy (Conservatives) 12.42%; ▌Chika Nwokorie (Conservatives) 11.84%; ▌Md Meraj Hossain (Conservatives) 11.22%; ▌Zulifqar Khan (Liberal Democrats) 4.68%
Parsloes	Elizabeth Kangethe	Labour	2010	Incumbent lost re-election. Reform Gain	▌ ✓ Billy Edmunds (Reform) 35.48%; ▌ ✓ Alexandra Arnautu (Reform) 34.88%; ▌ ✓ Ripon Sheikh (Reform) 31.16%; ▌Robert Jones (Labour) 27.53%; ▌Jeorgina Soares (Labour) 26.88%; ▌Taiwo Bodunrin (Green) 25.63%; ▌Elizabeth Kangethe (Labour) 25.63%; ▌Syful Islam (Green) 25.06%; ▌Marzia Khatun (Green) 22.27%; ▌Sonjoy Roy (Conservatives) 12.42%; ▌Chika Nwokorie (Conservatives) 11.84%; ▌Md Meraj Hossain (Conservatives) 11.22%; ▌Zulifqar Khan (Liberal Democrats) 4.68%
Parsloes	Hardial Rai	Labour	2022	Incumbent retired. Reform Gain.	▌ ✓ Billy Edmunds (Reform) 35.48%; ▌ ✓ Alexandra Arnautu (Reform) 34.88%; ▌ ✓ Ripon Sheikh (Reform) 31.16%; ▌Robert Jones (Labour) 27.53%; ▌Jeorgina Soares (Labour) 26.88%; ▌Taiwo Bodunrin (Green) 25.63%; ▌Elizabeth Kangethe (Labour) 25.63%; ▌Syful Islam (Green) 25.06%; ▌Marzia Khatun (Green) 22.27%; ▌Sonjoy Roy (Conservatives) 12.42%; ▌Chika Nwokorie (Conservatives) 11.84%; ▌Md Meraj Hossain (Conservatives) 11.22%; ▌Zulifqar Khan (Liberal Democrats) 4.68%
Thames View	Lucy Lee	Labour	2025 (by-election)	Incumbent re-elected.	▌ ✓ Lucy Lee (Labour) 42.31%; ▌ ✓ Sabbir Zamee (Labour) 41.12%; ▌Emma Grove (Green) 29.25%; ▌Paul Powlesland (Green) 25.07%; ▌Ion Adam (Reform) 15.00%; ▌Karen Staddon (Reform) 14.55%; ▌Andrew Boff (Conservatives) 9.33%; ▌Comfort Adegbulugbe (Conservatives) 8.51%; ▌Lucy Baiye-Gaman (Christian Peoples Alliance) 3.06%; ▌Mine Mayda (Liberal Democrats) 2.54%
Thames View	Sabbir Zamee	Labour	2022	Incumbent re-elected.	▌ ✓ Lucy Lee (Labour) 42.31%; ▌ ✓ Sabbir Zamee (Labour) 41.12%; ▌Emma Grove (Green) 29.25%; ▌Paul Powlesland (Green) 25.07%; ▌Ion Adam (Reform) 15.00%; ▌Karen Staddon (Reform) 14.55%; ▌Andrew Boff (Conservatives) 9.33%; ▌Comfort Adegbulugbe (Conservatives) 8.51%; ▌Lucy Baiye-Gaman (Christian Peoples Alliance) 3.06%; ▌Mine Mayda (Liberal Democrats) 2.54%
Valence	Jane Jones	Labour	2014	Incumbent re-elected.	▌ ✓ Syed Ghani (Labour) 37.60%; ▌ ✓ Jane Jones (Labour) 35.20%; ▌ ✓ Kim Barti(Reform) 35.11%; ▌Barb Gibbs (Reform) 34.34%; ▌Laura Iosifescu (Labour) 32.92%; ▌Mavis Oti Boakye (Reform) 31.82%; ▌Saqib Bashir (Green) 26.05%; ▌Mark Akindeko (Conservatives) 10.30%; ▌Amber Ijaz (Liberal Democrats) 9.15%; ▌Vivien Ojo (Conservatives) 8.20%; ▌Goodluck Uba (Conservatives) 6.81%
Valence	Maureen Worby	Labour	1988 (by-election) 2006 (retired) 2010	Incumbent ran in Eastbury. New Councillor elected Reform Gain	▌ ✓ Syed Ghani (Labour) 37.60%; ▌ ✓ Jane Jones (Labour) 35.20%; ▌ ✓ Kim Barti(Reform) 35.11%; ▌Barb Gibbs (Reform) 34.34%; ▌Laura Iosifescu (Labour) 32.92%; ▌Mavis Oti Boakye (Reform) 31.82%; ▌Saqib Bashir (Green) 26.05%; ▌Mark Akindeko (Conservatives) 10.30%; ▌Amber Ijaz (Liberal Democrats) 9.15%; ▌Vivien Ojo (Conservatives) 8.20%; ▌Goodluck Uba (Conservatives) 6.81%
Valence	Syed Ghani	Labour	2014	Incumbent re-elected.	▌ ✓ Syed Ghani (Labour) 37.60%; ▌ ✓ Jane Jones (Labour) 35.20%; ▌ ✓ Kim Barti(Reform) 35.11%; ▌Barb Gibbs (Reform) 34.34%; ▌Laura Iosifescu (Labour) 32.92%; ▌Mavis Oti Boakye (Reform) 31.82%; ▌Saqib Bashir (Green) 26.05%; ▌Mark Akindeko (Conservatives) 10.30%; ▌Amber Ijaz (Liberal Democrats) 9.15%; ▌Vivien Ojo (Conservatives) 8.20%; ▌Goodluck Uba (Conservatives) 6.81%
Village	Julia Williams	Labour	2024 (by-election)	Incumbent re-elected.	▌ ✓ Ajanta Roy (Labour) 49.05%; ▌ ✓ Phil Waker (Labour) 47.55%; ▌ ✓ Julia Williams (Labour) 47.49%; ▌Del Hunter (Reform) 32.03%; ▌Michael Smith (Reform) 32.03%; ▌Marina Sanduleac (Reform) 30.53%; ▌Sheikh Ahmed (Conservatives) 12.95%; ▌Graham Gosling (Conservatives) 10.62%; ▌Arinola Araba (Conservatives) 10.18%; ▌Olumide Adeyefa (Liberal Democrats) 9.83%
Village	Ajanta Roy	Labour	2024 (by-election)	Incumbent re-elected.	▌ ✓ Ajanta Roy (Labour) 49.05%; ▌ ✓ Phil Waker (Labour) 47.55%; ▌ ✓ Julia Williams (Labour) 47.49%; ▌Del Hunter (Reform) 32.03%; ▌Michael Smith (Reform) 32.03%; ▌Marina Sanduleac (Reform) 30.53%; ▌Sheikh Ahmed (Conservatives) 12.95%; ▌Graham Gosling (Conservatives) 10.62%; ▌Arinola Araba (Conservatives) 10.18%; ▌Olumide Adeyefa (Liberal Democrats) 9.83%
Village	Phil Waker	Labour	2004 (by-election)	Incumbent re-elected.	▌ ✓ Ajanta Roy (Labour) 49.05%; ▌ ✓ Phil Waker (Labour) 47.55%; ▌ ✓ Julia Williams (Labour) 47.49%; ▌Del Hunter (Reform) 32.03%; ▌Michael Smith (Reform) 32.03%; ▌Marina Sanduleac (Reform) 30.53%; ▌Sheikh Ahmed (Conservatives) 12.95%; ▌Graham Gosling (Conservatives) 10.62%; ▌Arinola Araba (Conservatives) 10.18%; ▌Olumide Adeyefa (Liberal Democrats) 9.83%
Whalebone	Rubina Siddiqui	Labour	2025 (by-election)	Incumbent re-elected.	▌ ✓ Rubina Siddiqui (Labour) 42.04%; ▌ ✓ Andrew Achilleos (Labour) 40.90%; ▌ ✓ Mukhtar Yusuf (Labour) 36.66%; ▌Nazrul Islam (Green) 26.65%; ▌Dixant Patel (Conservatives) 26.65%; ▌Adrian Gregory-Brown (Reform) 25.96%; ▌Ramesh Boddukola (Reform) 25.70%; ▌Kenneth Odunze (Conservatives) 12.43%; ▌Ada Echedom (Conservatives) 12.33%; ▌Olesea Pasat (Reform) 10.83%; ▌ Herbert Munangatire (Liberal Democrats) 7.44%
Whalebone	Andrew Achilleos	Labour	2018	Incumbent re-elected.	▌ ✓ Rubina Siddiqui (Labour) 42.04%; ▌ ✓ Andrew Achilleos (Labour) 40.90%; ▌ ✓ Mukhtar Yusuf (Labour) 36.66%; ▌Nazrul Islam (Green) 26.65%; ▌Dixant Patel (Conservatives) 26.65%; ▌Adrian Gregory-Brown (Reform) 25.96%; ▌Ramesh Boddukola (Reform) 25.70%; ▌Kenneth Odunze (Conservatives) 12.43%; ▌Ada Echedom (Conservatives) 12.33%; ▌Olesea Pasat (Reform) 10.83%; ▌ Herbert Munangatire (Liberal Democrats) 7.44%
Whalebone	Mukhtar Yusuf	Labour	2022	Incumbent re-elected.	▌ ✓ Rubina Siddiqui (Labour) 42.04%; ▌ ✓ Andrew Achilleos (Labour) 40.90%; ▌ ✓ Mukhtar Yusuf (Labour) 36.66%; ▌Nazrul Islam (Green) 26.65%; ▌Dixant Patel (Conservatives) 26.65%; ▌Adrian Gregory-Brown (Reform) 25.96%; ▌Ramesh Boddukola (Reform) 25.70%; ▌Kenneth Odunze (Conservatives) 12.43%; ▌Ada Echedom (Conservatives) 12.33%; ▌Olesea Pasat (Reform) 10.83%; ▌ Herbert Munangatire (Liberal Democrats) 7.44%

=== Results by party ===
Council composition after the 2022 election

Council composition after the 2026 election

2026 Barking and Dagenham London Borough Council election
Party	Seats	Gains	Losses	Net gain/loss	Seats %	Votes %	Votes	+/−
Labour	38	0	13	▼13	74.5	37.8	50,156	▼43.2
Reform	9	9	0	▲9	17.6	26.8	35,634	N/A
Green	4	4	0	▲4	7.8	20.5	27,282	▲19.2
Conservative	0	0	0	Steady	0.0	11.2	14,931	▼5.9
Liberal Democrats	0	0	0	Steady	0.0	2.3	3,025	▲1.9
Independent	0	0	0	Steady	0.0	1.1	1,396	▲0.6
Workers Party	0	0	0	Steady	0.0	0.2	214	N/A
CPA	0	0	0	Steady	0.0	0.1	184	0.0

=== Close races ===
The party named after the vote margin is the party which came closest to winning the seat.

Seats where the margin of victory was under 1 percentage point (5 seats):

1. Northbury 3rd, 0.36% (10 votes) - Green
2. Valence 2nd, 0.86% (29 votes) - Reform
3. Barking Riverside 3rd, 0.93% (22 votes) - Green
4. Alibon 2nd, 0.96% (11 votes) - Reform
5. Eastbury 3rd, 0.97% (34 votes) - Green

Seats where the margin of victory was between 1 and 5 percentage points (11 seats):

1. Mayesbrook 3rd, 2.19% (72 votes) - Reform
2. Valence 3rd, 2.19% (74 votes) - Labour
3. Longbridge 3rd, 2.32% (94 votes) - Labour
4. Gascoigne 2nd, 3.12% (78 votes) - Labour
5. Mayesbrook 2nd, 3.23% (106 votes) - Reform
6. Abbey 2nd, 3.46% (43 votes) - Green
7. Parsloes 3rd, 3.63% (134 votes) - Labour
8. Gascoigne 3rd, 3.80% (95 votes) - Green
9. Northbury 2nd, 4.14% (114 votes) - Green
10. Eastbury 2nd, 4.63% (180 votes) - Reform
11. Mayesbrook 1st, 4.84% (159 votes) - Reform

The tipping point seat was Village 3rd, which had a 15.46% margin for Labour over Reform.

== Ward results ==
6 incumbents lost re-election

Victoria Hornby (Green, Barking Riverside), first elected as Labour in 2022 lost to Marion Lesley Hull

Princess Bright (Labour, Eastbrook and Rush Green, first elected in 2018 lost to Ron Emin

Irma Freeborn (Labour, Goresbrook), first elected in 2014 lost to George Miller

Paul Robinson (Labour, Goresbrook), first elected in 2018 lost to Caleb Van Ryneveld

Lynda Rice (Conservative, Longbridge), first elected as Labour in 2010 lost to Faruk Choudhury

Elizabeth Kangethe (Labour, Parsloes), first elected in 2010 lost to Billy Edmunds

=== Abbey ===
Abbey (2)
Party	Candidate	Votes	%	±%
Labour	Manzoor Hussain*	478	38.4	−24.4
Labour	Regina Rahman*	457	36.7	−30.5
Green	Shazia Majeed	414	33.3	N/A
Green	Verinder Singh	406	32.6	N/A
Reform	Natasha Caulfield	166	13.3	N/A
Conservative	Eshan Attiq	158	12.7	N/A
Reform	Craig Pullen	141	11.3	N/A
Conservative	Kazi Reza	138	11.1	N/A
Liberal Democrats	Malik Rabbani	52	4.2	N/A
Turnout		1,244	31.9	+5.3
Registered electors		3,900		
Labour hold		Swing	-21.7	
Labour hold		Swing	-19.8	

=== Alibon ===
Alibon (2)
Party	Candidate	Votes	%	±%
Labour	Dorothy Akwaboah*	981	42.9	−19.3
Labour	Muazzam Sandhu^	894	39.1	N/A
Reform	Tracey Sullivan-Sparks	883	38.6	N/A
Reform	Nick Vandyke	828	36.2	N/A
Conservative	Ikem Chinedu	284	12.4	N/A
Conservative	Abul Khayer	267	11.7	N/A
Liberal Democrats	Brianne Wooding	219	9.6	N/A
Turnout		2,289	32.3	+9.3
Registered electors		7,087		
Labour hold		Swing	-32.0	
Labour hold		Swing	-30.9	

^Elected in Beam ward in 2022

=== Barking Riverside ===
Barking Riverside (3)
Party	Candidate	Votes	%	±%
Labour	Josie Channer*	930	39.5	−22.4
Labour	Cameron Geddes*	918	39.0	−20.9
Labour	Marion Lesley Hull	823	35.0	N/A
Green	Victoria Hornby^	801	34.0	−25.7
Green	Mizanur Rahman	789	33.5	N/A
Green	Godfrey Kizito Sekisonge	668	28.4	N/A
Reform	Jim Holland	395	16.8	N/A
Reform	Ion Talambuta	329	14.0	N/A
Reform	Ion Uraschi	324	13.8	N/A
Conservative	Mohammad Gias Uddin	179	7.6	N/A
Conservative	Helal Talukder	169	7.2	N/A
Conservative	Musammat Meherun Nessa Khanam	146	6.2	N/A
CPA	Gabriel Abe	143	6.1	N/A
Liberal Democrats	Syed I Kazmi	86	3.6	N/A
Turnout		2,353	28.3	+3.8
Registered electors		8,300		
Labour hold		Swing	-25.4	
Labour hold		Swing	-27.2	
Labour hold		Swing	-29.4	

^Incumbent, elected as Labour in 2022

=== Beam ===
Beam (3)
Party	Candidate	Votes	%	±%
Labour	Muhib Chowdhury*	826	47.0	−14.4
Labour	Donna Lumsden*	771	43.9	−21.1
Labour	Glen Spoor	690	39.3	N/A
Reform	Anish Samuel	429	24.4	N/A
Reform	Nina Sontea	413	23.5	N/A
Green	Ionel Popa	400	22.8	N/A
Reform	Mariana Suciu	400	22.8	N/A
Liberal Democrats	George Elebiju	226	12.9	N/A
Conservative	Mehreen Iqbal	189	10.8	N/A
Conservative	Taye Ishola	186	10.6	N/A
Conservative	Joseph Omorere	161	9.2	N/A
Turnout		1,757	29.7	+3.5
Registered electors		5,922		
Labour hold		Swing	-20.4	
Labour hold		Swing	-20.5	
Labour hold		Swing	-22.2	

=== Becontree ===
Becontree (2)
Party	Candidate	Votes	%	±%
Labour	Edna Fergus*	879	37.6	−37.7
Labour	Muhammad Saleem*	817	34.9	−32.4
Reform	Ann Clark	621	26.5	N/A
Reform	Dave Godfrey	600	25.6	N/A
Green	Masood Pasha	496	21.2	N/A
Green	Mary-Ann Murphy	404	17.3	N/A
Independent	Muhammad Ahmadzai	280	12.0	N/A
Conservative	Mohammed Islam	161	6.9	N/A
Conservative	Minhaz Khan	148	6.0	N/A
Liberal Democrats	Mohammad Yaqoob	54	2.3	N/A
Turnout		2,340	40.5	+17.3
Registered electors		5,776		
Labour hold		Swing		
Labour hold		Swing		

=== Chadwell Heath ===
Chadwell Heath (3)
Party	Candidate	Votes	%	±%
Labour	Sade Bright*	1,137	37.4	−35.2
Labour	Simon Perry*	1,135	37.4	−33.9
Labour	Michel Pongo*	994	32.7	−29.9
Reform	Paul Hewson	838	27.6	N/A
Green	Vivian Ebal	800	26.3	N/A
Green	Debbie Rosaman	766	25.2	N/A
Reform	Fuad Ashraf	730	24.0	N/A
Reform	Muhammad Hamza	706	23.2	N/A
Conservative	Kamini Sharma	364	12.0	N/A
Conservative	Arinze Nwanna	306	10.1	N/A
Liberal Democrats	Mohib Shah	290	9.5	N/A
Conservative	Anonta Sutradhar	281	9.2	N/A
Turnout		3,037	31.6	+5.4
Registered electors		9,605		
Labour hold		Swing	-30.2	
Labour hold		Swing	-30.1	
Labour hold		Swing	-28.8	

=== Eastbrook and Rush Green ===
Eastbrook and Rush Green (2)
Party	Candidate	Votes	%	±%
Reform	Ron Emin	973	38.2	N/A
Reform	Ben Suter	951	37.3	N/A
Labour	Princess Bright*	782	30.7	−20.8
Labour	Amimul Tanim	731	28.7	N/A
Green	Djena Balde	424	16.6	N/A
Green	Sheikh Nadeem	400	15.7	N/A
Conservative	Neil Hallewell	224	8.8	N/A
Conservative	James Tyler	215	8.4	N/A
Independent	Lewis Holmes	143	5.6	N/A
Independent	Ashlea Wane	78	3.1	N/A
Liberal Democrats	Nomsa Munangatire	72	2.8	N/A
Turnout		2,549	40.5	+13.3
Registered electors		6,292		
Reform gain from Labour		Swing	+29.2	
Reform gain from Labour		Swing	+29.1	

=== Eastbury ===
Eastbury (3)
Party	Candidate	Votes	%	±%
Labour	Mohammed Khan*	1,112	31.6	−32.9
Labour	Dominic Twomey^	1,067	30.3	N/A
Labour	Maureen Worby"	1,028	29.2	N/A
Green	Mohammod Uddin	994	28.7	N/A
Reform	Costel Filipescu	904	25.7	N/A
Reform	Zinaida Birlea	887	25.2	N/A
Green	Romas Bugaitis	877	24.9	N/A
Reform	Sisir Das	861	24.5	N/A
Green	Pinar Polat	813	23.1	N/A
Conservative	Monzour Ahamed	411	11.7	N/A
Conservative	Joshua Yousaf	401	11.4	N/A
Conservative	Azizur Rahman	325	9.2	N/A
Liberal Democrats	Elizabeth Makinde	227	6.4	N/A
Turnout		3,517	33.7	+12.6
Registered electors		10,442		
Labour hold		Swing		
Labour hold		Swing		
Labour hold		Swing		

^ Elected in Gascoigne ward in 2022
" Elected in Valence ward in 2022

=== Gascoigne ===
Gascoigne (3)
Party	Candidate	Votes	%	±%
Green	Moin Quadri^	964	38.5	N/A
Green	Nazrul Kazi	940	37.5	N/A
Labour	Alison Cormack*	864	34.5	−46.2
Labour	Ashwin Balluck	862	34.4	N/A
Labour	Kaied Ghiyatha	791	31.6	N/A
Green	Silvia Rotaru	769	30.7	N/A
Conservative	Abedin Kazi	317	12.7	N/A
Reform	Vera Botnari	255	10.2	N/A
Conservative	Adriana Saldana	240	9.6	N/A
Reform	Mihaela Melinte	236	9.4	N/A
Conservative	Lilufar Begum	234	9.3	N/A
Reform	Tadas Karkauskas	225	9.0	N/A
Workers Party	Qasim Tahir	214	8.5	N/A
Liberal Democrats	Ayfer Cebi	84	3.4	N/A
Turnout		2,503	30.5	+6.3
Registered electors		8,193		
Green gain from Labour		Swing		
Green gain from Labour		Swing		
Labour hold		Swing		

^Elected as Labour in Gorsebrook in 2022

=== Goresbrook ===
Goresbrook (3)
Party	Candidate	Votes	%	±%
Reform	George Miller	1,309	42.0	N/A
Reform	Caleb Van Ryneveld	1,170	37.6	N/A
Reform	Manjeet Nandra	1,149	36.9	N/A
Labour	Irma Freeborn*	874	28.1	−34.3
Labour	Paul Robinson*	818	26.3	−39.1
Labour	Nassaba Guiba	772	24.8	N/A
Green	Sheikh Ahmed	664	21.3	N/A
Green	Poly Ara	560	18.0	N/A
Conservative	Colin Bowman	444	14.3	N/A
Conservative	Mohammed Islam	370	11.9	N/A
Conservative	Sharfaraz Raj	330	10.6	−16.5
Liberal Democrats	Muhammad Awan	170	5.5	N/A
Turnout		3,114	35.1	+10.4
Registered electors		8,859		
Reform gain from Labour		Swing		
Reform gain from Labour		Swing		
Reform gain from Labour		Swing		

=== Heath ===
Heath (2)
Party	Candidate	Votes	%	±%
Labour	Ingrid Robinson*	959	48.1	−19.1
Labour	Harriet Spoor^	883	44.3	N/A
Reform	Lee Willoughby	662	33.2	N/A
Reform	Sunil Idiculla	603	30.2	N/A
Conservative	Abdullah Alam	250	12.5	N/A
Liberal Democrats	Naveed Akbar	225	11.3	N/A
Conservative	Corine Mengalle	167	8.4	N/A
Turnout		1,994	32.9	+9.8
Registered electors		6,059		
Labour hold		Swing		
Labour hold		Swing		

^Elected in a 2023 by-election

=== Longbridge ===
Longbridge (3)
Party	Candidate	Votes	%	±%
Green	Faruk Choudhury^	1,630	40.3	N/A
Labour	Rocky Gill*	1,439	35.6	−34.8
Green	Mashkura Mazid	1,250	30.9	N/A
Labour	Emran Chowdhury	1,156	28.6	N/A
Green	Tim Hunt	1,117	27.6	N/A
Labour	Val Masson	936	23.1	N/A
Independent	Mohammed Hussain	895	22.1	N/A
Conservative	Shah Rahman	849	21.0	−16.4
Reform	Marin Adam	449	11.1	N/A
Reform	Chris Fennessy	416	10.3	N/A
Conservative	Lynda Jane Rice^	408	10.1	N/A
Reform	Alexandru Suciu	359	8.9	N/A
Conservative	Joe McNicholl	355	8.8	N/A
Liberal Democrats	Ghulam Rasool	101	2.5	N/A
Turnout		4,046	43.6	+9.2
Registered electors		9,271		
Green gain from Labour		Swing		
Labour hold		Swing		
Green gain from Labour		Swing		

^Elected as Labour in 2022

=== Mayesbrook ===
Mayesbrook (3)
Party	Candidate	Votes	%	±%
Labour	Shamsul Azam	1,182	36.0	N/A
Labour	Kashif Haroon*	1,129	34.4	−28.5
Labour	Faiza Noreen	1,105	33.7	N/A
Reform	Andy McNab	1,033	31.5	N/A
Reform	Ray Anderson	1,023	31.2	N/A
Reform	Bijoy Johnson	1,023	31.2	N/A
Green	Raju Ahamad	758	23.1	N/A
Green	Juliano Nunes	719	21.9	N/A
Green	Syed Roomy	637	19.4	N/A
Conservative	Shahana Choudhury	247	7.5	N/A
Conservative	Tamanna Mirza	224	6.8	N/A
Conservative	Mizanur Rahman	195	5.9	N/A
Liberal Democrats	Waheed Nazir	128	3.9	N/A
Turnout		3,283	33.2	+12.6
Registered electors		9,889		
Labour hold		Swing		
Labour hold		Swing		
Labour hold		Swing		

=== Northbury ===
Northbury (3)
Party	Candidate	Votes	%	±%
Labour	Saima Ashraf*	1,146	41.6	−32.5
Labour	Giasuddin Miah*	1,003	36.4	−31.0
Labour	Summya Sohaib^	950	34.5	N/A
Green	Curtis Cooper	940	34.1	N/A
Green	Khawar Nasim	889	32.3	N/A
Green	Aiden Nicholls	868	31.5	N/A
Conservative	Shibli Rahman	342	12.4	N/A
Reform	Scott Cleaver	328	11.91	N/A
Conservative	Ahad Hossain	326	11.8	N/A
Conservative	Rasel Miha	309	11.2	N/A
Reform	Paul Mateiu	289	10.5	N/A
Reform	Lesley McNab	276	10.0	N/A
Liberal Democrats	Mehnaz Ali	129	4.7	N/A
Turnout		2,754	30.3	+6.7
Registered electors		9,089		
Labour hold		Swing		
Labour hold		Swing		
Labour hold		Swing		

^Elected in a 2023 by-election

=== Parsloes ===
Parsloes (3)
Party	Candidate	Votes	%	±%
Reform	Billy Edmunds	1,308	35.5	N/A
Reform	Alexandra Arnautu	1,286	34.9	N/A
Reform	Ripon Sheikh	1,149	31.2	N/A
Labour	Robert Jones	1,015	27.5	N/A
Labour	Jeorgina Soares	991	26.9	N/A
Green	Taiwo Bodunrin	945	25.6	N/A
Labour	Elizabeth Kangethe*	945	25.6	−43.0
Green	Syful Islam	924	25.1	N/A
Green	Marzia Khatun	821	22.3	N/A
Conservative	Sonjoy Roy	312	8.5	N/A
Conservative	Chika Nwokorie	287	7.8	N/A
Conservative	Md Meraj Hossain	281	7.6	N/A
Liberal Democrats	Zulifqar Khan	132	3.6	N/A
Turnout		3,687	36.5	+14.6
Registered electors		10,093		
Reform gain from Labour		Swing		
Reform gain from Labour		Swing		
Reform gain from Labour		Swing		

=== Thames View ===
Thames View (2)
Party	Candidate	Votes	%	±%
Labour	Lucy Lee^	567	42.3	N/A
Labour	Sabbir Zamee*	551	41.1	−21.4
Green	Emma Grove	392	29.2	N/A
Green	Paul Powlesland	336	25.1	N/A
Reform	Ion Adam	201	15.0	N/A
Reform	Karen Staddon	195	14.5	N/A
Conservative	Andrew Boff	125	9.3	−16.7
Conservative	Comfort Adegbulugbe	114	8.5	N/A
CPA	Lucy Baiye-Gaman	41	3.1	−5.9
Liberal Democrats	Mine Mayda	34	2.5	N/A
Turnout		1,340	34.8	+6.4
Registered electors		3,848		
Labour hold		Swing		
Labour hold		Swing		

^Elected in a 2025 by-election

=== Valence ===
Valence (3)
Party	Candidate	Votes	%	±%
Labour	Syed Ghani*	1,270	37.6	−26.8
Labour	Jane Jones*	1,189	35.2	−36.6
Reform	Kim Barti	1,186	35.1	N/A
Reform	Barb Gibbs	1,160	34.3	N/A
Labour	Laura Iosifescu	1,112	32.9	N/A
Reform	Mavis Oti Boakye	1,075	31.8	N/A
Green	Saqib Bashir	880	26.0	N/A
Conservative	Mark Akindeko	348	10.30	N/A
Liberal Democrats	Amber Ijaz	309	9.1	N/A
Conservative	Vivien Ojo	277	8.2	N/A
Conservative	Goodluck Uba	230	6.8	N/A
Turnout		3,378	32.8	+11.5
Registered electors		10,296		
Labour hold		Swing		
Labour hold		Swing		
Reform gain from Labour		Swing		

=== Village ===
Village (3)
Party	Candidate	Votes	%	±%
Labour	Ajanta Roy^	1,542	49.0	N/A
Labour	Phil Waker*	1,495	47.5	−26.7
Labour	Julia Williams^	1,493	47.5	N/A
Reform	Del Hunter	1,007	32.0	N/A
Reform	Michael Smith	1,007	32.0	N/A
Reform	Marina Sanduleac	960	30.5	N/A
Conservative	Sheikh Ahmed	407	12.9	N/A
Conservative	Graham Gosling	334	10.6	N/A
Conservative	Arinola Araba	320	10.2	N/A
Liberal Democrats	Olumide Adeyefa	309	9.8	N/A
Turnout		3,144	36.8	+10.6
Registered electors		8,539		
Labour hold		Swing		
Labour hold		Swing		
Labour hold		Swing		

^Elected in a 2024 by-election

=== Whalebone ===
Whalebone (3)
Party	Candidate	Votes	%	±%
Labour	Rubina Siddiqui^	1,289	42.0	N/A
Labour	Andrew Achilleos*	1,254	40.9	−28.8
Labour	Mukhtar Yusuf*	1,124	36.7	−22.8
Green	Nazrul Islam	817	26.6	N/A
Conservative	Dixant Patel	817	26.6	N/A
Reform	Adrian Gregory-Brown	796	26.0	N/A
Reform	Ramesh Boddukola	788	25.7	N/A
Conservative	Kenneth Odunze	381	12.4	N/A
Conservative	Ada Echedom	378	12.3	N/A
Reform	Olesea Pasat	332	10.8	N/A
Liberal Democrats	Herbert Munangatire	228	7.4	N/A
Turnout		3,066	33.2	+6.0
Registered electors		9,238		
Labour hold		Swing		
Labour hold		Swing		
Labour hold		Swing		

^Elected in a 2025 by-election

== By-elections between 2026 and 2030 ==
None yet
