= 2022 Barking and Dagenham London Borough Council election =

2022 local election in Barking and Dagenham

2022 Barking and Dagenham Council election
- 5 May 2022

All 51 seats on Barking and Dagenham Council 26 seats needed for a majority
- Registered: 140,993
- Turnout: 34,525; 24.49%
| | First party | Second party |
|---|---|---|
| Leader | Darren Rodwell |
| Party | Labour | Conservative |
| Leader since | 17 May 2014 |
| Last election | 51 seats, 74.4% | 0 seats, 23.6% |
| Seats won | 51 | 0 |
| Seat change | Steady | Steady |
| Popular vote | 64,034 | 13,980 |
| Percentage | 79.7 | 17.4 |
- Map of the results of the 2022 Barking and Dagenham council election. Labour in red.

Council control before election
Labour
Subsequent council control
Labour

The 2022 Barking and Dagenham London Borough Council election took place on 5 May 2022. All 51 members of Barking and Dagenham London Borough Council were elected. The elections took place alongside local elections in the other London boroughs and elections to local authorities across the United Kingdom.

In the previous election in 2018, the Labour Party maintained its longstanding control of the council, winning all fifty-one seats. The 2022 election took place under new election boundaries with the Labour Party once again winning all seats.

On 15th September 2025, three Labour Councillors resigned from the party and joined the Green Party. They formed the first opposition group on the Council since 2006.

== Background ==
=== History ===
Result of the 2018 borough election

The thirty-two London boroughs were established in 1965 by the London Government Act 1963. They are the principal authorities in Greater London and have responsibilities including education, housing, planning, highways, social services, libraries, recreation, waste, environmental health and revenue collection. Some of the powers are shared with the Greater London Authority, which also manages passenger transport, police and fire.

Barking and Dagenham has been controlled by the Labour Party since its establishment. The Conservatives, Liberal Democrats, independents and residents associations have also held seats on the borough. The 2006 election saw the British National Party winning twelve of the fifty-one seats, none of which they held in the 2010 election, in which every seat was won by Labour. In the 2014 election and the most recent election in 2018 all fifty-one seats continued to be won by the Labour Party. The party won 74.4% of the vote across the borough. The Conservatives won 23.6% of the vote and no seats. The incumbent leader of the council is the Labour councillor Darren Rodwell, who had held that position since 2014.

=== Council term ===
Bill Turner, a councillor for Thames ward, resigned in 2021. A by-election to replace him was held in 2021 alongside that year's mayoral election and London Assembly election. The London Assembly member Andrew Boff was selected as the Conservative candidate. He called the election a "referendum on democracy", expressing his opposition to the Labour council's introduction of a Controlled Parking Zone in the ward. The Labour candidate Fatuma Nalule won the election, with Boff coming second.

Along with most other London boroughs, Barking and Dagenham was subject to a boundary review ahead of the 2022 election. The Local Government Boundary Commission for England concluded that the council should maintain fifty-one seats, but produced new election boundaries following a period of consultation. The plans will see two additional wards, resulting in six of the nineteen new wards being represented by two councillors and the rest being represented by three councillors. Boundaries changed for every ward except for Longbridge.

== Electoral process ==
Barking and Dagenham, as is the case all other London borough councils, elects all of its councillors at once every four years, with the previous election having taken place in 2018. The election took place by multi-member first-past-the-post voting, with each ward being represented by two or three councillors. Electors will have as many votes as there are councillors to be elected in their ward, with the top two or three being elected.

All registered electors (British, Irish, Commonwealth and European Union citizens) living in London aged 18 or over were entitled to vote in the election. People who lived at two addresses in different councils, such as university students with different term-time and holiday addresses, were entitled to be registered for and vote in elections in both local authorities. Voting in-person at polling stations took place from 7:00 to 22:00 on election day, and voters were able to apply for postal votes or proxy votes in advance of the election.

== Previous council composition ==
Council composition following the 2018 election, as well as ahead of and following the 2022 election

| After 2018 election | | Before 2022 election | | After 2022 election | |
| Party | Seats | Party | Seats | Party | Seats |
|---|---|---|---|---|---|
| Labour | 51 | Labour | 51 | Labour | 51 |

== Results summary ==
2022 Barking and Dagenham London Borough Council election
| Party | Seats | Gains | Losses | Net gain/loss | Seats % | Votes % | Votes | +/− |
|---|---|---|---|---|---|---|---|---|
| Labour | 51 | 0 | 0 | Steady | 100.0 | 79.7 | 64,034 | ▲5.3 |
| Conservative | 0 | 0 | 0 | Steady | 0.0 | 17.4 | 13,980 | ▼6.2 |
| Green | 0 | 0 | 0 | Steady | 0.0 | 1.3 | 1,030 | ▲0.5 |
| TUSC | 0 | 0 | 0 | Steady | 0.0 | 0.6 | 462 | N/A |
| Independent | 0 | 0 | 0 | Steady | 0.0 | 0.5 | 398 | ▼0.4 |
| Liberal Democrats | 0 | 0 | 0 | Steady | 0.0 | 0.5 | 373 | N/A |
| CPA | 0 | 0 | 0 | Steady | 0.0 | 0.1 | 91 | N/A |

== Ward results ==
Statements of persons nominated were published on 6 April 2022. Incumbent councillors are marked with an asterisk (*).

=== Abbey ===
Abbey (2)
| Party | Candidate | Votes | % | ±% |
|---|---|---|---|---|
| Labour | Regina Rahman | 503 | 67.2 | N/A |
| Labour | Manzoor Hussain | 470 | 62.8 | N/A |
| Green | Annabel Allam | 148 | 19.8 | N/A |
| Green | Michael Gold | 135 | 18.0 | N/A |
| Conservative | Ada Echedom | 110 | 14.7 | N/A |
| Turnout | | 749 | 26.6 | N/A |
| Registered electors | | 2,802 | | |
| Labour hold | | Swing | | |
| Labour hold | | Swing | | |

=== Alibon ===
Alibon (2)
| Party | Candidate | Votes | % | ±% |
|---|---|---|---|---|
| Labour | John Dulwich* | 1,060 | 70.7 | N/A |
| Labour | Dorothy Akwaboah* | 932 | 62.2 | N/A |
| Conservative | Arjun Singh Jaiya | 415 | 27.7 | N/A |
| Turnout | | 1,499 | 22.7 | N/A |
| Registered electors | | 6,524 | | |
| Labour hold | | Swing | | |
| Labour hold | | Swing | | |

=== Barking Riverside ===
Barking Riverside (3)
| Party | Candidate | Votes | % | ±% |
|---|---|---|---|---|
| Labour | Josie Channer* | 923 | 61.9 | N/A |
| Labour | Cameron Geddes* | 893 | 59.9 | N/A |
| Labour | Victoria Hornby | 890 | 59.7 | N/A |
| Conservative | Mizanur Rahman | 381 | 25.6 | N/A |
| Conservative | Mohammad Bhuyan | 292 | 19.6 | N/A |
| Conservative | Anthony Oladimeji | 291 | 19.5 | N/A |
| TUSC | Pete Mason | 233 | 15.6 | N/A |
| Turnout | | 1,491 | 24.5 | N/A |
| Registered electors | | 6,037 | | |
| Labour win (new seat) | | | | |
| Labour win (new seat) | | | | |
| Labour win (new seat) | | | | |

=== Beam ===
Beam (3)
| Party | Candidate | Votes | % | ±% |
|---|---|---|---|---|
| Labour | Donna Lumsden* | 904 | 65.0 | N/A |
| Labour | Muhib Chowdhury | 854 | 61.4 | N/A |
| Labour | Muazzam Sandhu | 825 | 59.3 | N/A |
| Conservative | Karen Whittaker | 433 | 31.1 | N/A |
| Conservative | Mark Smith | 426 | 30.6 | N/A |
| Conservative | Manvindra Jaiya | 417 | 30.0 | N/A |
| Turnout | | 1,391 | 26.2 | N/A |
| Registered electors | | 5,277 | | |
| Labour win (new seat) | | | | |
| Labour win (new seat) | | | | |
| Labour win (new seat) | | | | |

=== Becontree ===
Becontree (2)
| Party | Candidate | Votes | % | ±% |
|---|---|---|---|---|
| Labour | Edna Fergus* | 1,121 | 75.3 | N/A |
| Labour | Muhammad Saleem* | 1,002 | 67.3 | N/A |
| Conservative | Anthony Egbuhuzor | 334 | 22.4 | N/A |
| Turnout | | 1,489 | 23.2 | N/A |
| Registered electors | | 6,365 | | |
| Labour hold | | Swing | | |
| Labour hold | | Swing | | |

=== Chadwell Heath ===
Chadwell Heath (3)
| Party | Candidate | Votes | % | ±% |
|---|---|---|---|---|
| Labour | Sade Bright* | 1,723 | 72.6 | N/A |
| Labour | Simon Perry* | 1,693 | 71.3 | N/A |
| Labour | Michael Pongo | 1,486 | 62.6 | N/A |
| Conservative | Martin Lynch | 672 | 28.3 | N/A |
| Turnout | | 2,374 | 26.2 | N/A |
| Registered electors | | 7,454 | | |
| Labour hold | | Swing | | |
| Labour hold | | Swing | | |
| Labour hold | | Swing | | |

=== Eastbrook and Rush Green ===
Eastbrook and Rush Green (2)
| Party | Candidate | Votes | % | ±% |
|---|---|---|---|---|
| Labour | Princess Bright* | 859 | 51.5 | N/A |
| Labour | Tony Ramsay* | 816 | 48.9 | N/A |
| Conservative | Sue Connelly | 591 | 35.4 | N/A |
| Conservative | Emma Lynch | 525 | 31.5 | N/A |
| Independent | Ron Emin | 238 | 14.3 | N/A |
| Independent | Dean Hillyard | 160 | 9.6 | N/A |
| Turnout | | 1,669 | 27.2 | N/A |
| Registered electors | | 6,130 | | |
| Labour win (new seat) | | | | |
| Labour win (new seat) | | | | |

=== Eastbury ===
Eastbury (3)
| Party | Candidate | Votes | % | ±% |
|---|---|---|---|---|
| Labour | Emily Rodwell* | 1,494 | 69.8 | N/A |
| Labour | Mohammed Khan* | 1,381 | 64.6 | N/A |
| Labour | Faraaz Shaukat* | 1,321 | 61.8 | N/A |
| Conservative | Eunice Acheampomaa | 500 | 23.4 | N/A |
| Conservative | Poli Begum | 483 | 22.6 | N/A |
| Conservative | Costel Filipescu | 469 | 21.9 | N/A |
| Turnout | | 2,139 | 21.1 | N/A |
| Registered electors | | 10,041 | | |
| Labour hold | | Swing | | |
| Labour hold | | Swing | | |
| Labour hold | | Swing | | |

=== Gascoigne ===
Gascoigne (3)
| Party | Candidate | Votes | % | ±% |
|---|---|---|---|---|
| Labour | Alison Cormack | 1,272 | 80.7 | N/A |
| Labour | Jack Shaw | 1,146 | 72.7 | N/A |
| Labour | Dominic Twomey* | 1,121 | 71.1 | N/A |
| Conservative | Roma Tahir | 283 | 18.0 | N/A |
| TUSC | Ruth Mason | 154 | 9.8 | N/A |
| Turnout | | 1,576 | 24.2 | N/A |
| Registered electors | | 6,448 | | |
| Labour hold | | Swing | | |
| Labour hold | | Swing | | |
| Labour hold | | Swing | | |

=== Goresbrook ===
Goresbrook (3)
| Party | Candidate | Votes | % | ±% |
|---|---|---|---|---|
| Labour | Paul Robinson* | 1,292 | 65.4 | N/A |
| Labour | Irma Freeborn* | 1,233 | 62.4 | N/A |
| Labour | Moin Quadri* | 1,119 | 56.6 | N/A |
| Conservative | Sharfaraz Raj | 535 | 27.1 | N/A |
| Conservative | Mehreen Zahid Iqbal | 489 | 27.1 | N/A |
| Turnout | | 1,977 | 24.7 | N/A |
| Registered electors | | 8,858 | | |
| Labour hold | | Swing | | |
| Labour hold | | Swing | | |
| Labour hold | | Swing | | |

=== Heath ===
Heath (2)
| Party | Candidate | Votes | % | ±% |
|---|---|---|---|---|
| Labour | Olawale Martins* | 952 | 68.8 | N/A |
| Labour | Ingrid Robinson* | 930 | 67.2 | N/A |
| Conservative | Martynas Cekavicius | 338 | 24.4 | N/A |
| Conservative | Angelica Olawepo | 338 | 24.4 | N/A |
| Turnout | | 1,383 | 23.1 | N/A |
| Registered electors | | 5,901 | | |
| Labour hold | | Swing | | |
| Labour hold | | Swing | | |

=== Longbridge ===
Longbridge (3)
| Party | Candidate | Votes | % | ±% |
|---|---|---|---|---|
| Labour | Rocky Gill* | 2,164 | 70.4 | N/A |
| Labour | Faruk Choudhury* | 2,038 | 66.3 | N/A |
| Labour | Lynda Rice* | 1,746 | 56.8 | N/A |
| Conservative | Shah Rahman | 1,150 | 37.4 | N/A |
| Liberal Democrats | Zygimantas Adomavicius | 373 | 12.1 | N/A |
| Turnout | | 3,076 | 34.4 | −6.2 |
| Registered electors | | 8,922 | | |
| Labour hold | | Swing | | |
| Labour hold | | Swing | | |
| Labour hold | | Swing | | |

=== Mayesbrook ===
Mayesbrook (3)
| Party | Candidate | Votes | % | ±% |
|---|---|---|---|---|
| Labour | Nashitha Choudhury | 1,301 | 65.0 | N/A |
| Labour | Kashif Haroon* | 1,259 | 62.9 | N/A |
| Labour | Ade Oluwole* | 1,242 | 62.0 | N/A |
| Conservative | Andy McNab | 565 | 28.2 | N/A |
| Conservative | Florin Lazar | 559 | 27.9 | N/A |
| Turnout | | 2,002 | 20.6 | N/A |
| Registered electors | | 9,594 | | |
| Labour hold | | Swing | | |
| Labour hold | | Swing | | |
| Labour hold | | Swing | | |

=== Northbury ===
Northbury (3)
| Party | Candidate | Votes | % | ±% |
|---|---|---|---|---|
| Labour | Saima Ashraf* | 1,500 | 74.1 | N/A |
| Labour | Darren Rodwell* | 1,398 | 69.0 | N/A |
| Labour | Giasuddin Miah* | 1,364 | 67.4 | N/A |
| Conservative | Tariq Saeed | 363 | 17.9 | N/A |
| Green | Simon Anthony | 317 | 15.7 | N/A |
| Green | Alex Hollis | 221 | 10.9 | N/A |
| Green | Jon Wright | 209 | 10.3 | N/A |
| Turnout | | 2,025 | 23.6 | N/A |
| Registered electors | | 8,545 | | |
| Labour win (new seat) | | | | |
| Labour win (new seat) | | | | |
| Labour win (new seat) | | | | |

=== Parsloes ===
Parsloes (3)
| Party | Candidate | Votes | % | ±% |
|---|---|---|---|---|
| Labour | Chris Rice* | 1,558 | 71.0 | N/A |
| Labour | Elizabeth Kangethe* | 1,506 | 68.6 | N/A |
| Labour | Hardial Rai | 1,296 | 59.1 | N/A |
| Conservative | Tilly Wijesuriya | 577 | 26.3 | N/A |
| Turnout | | 2,194 | 21.9 | N/A |
| Registered electors | | 6,956 | | |
| Labour hold | | Swing | | |
| Labour hold | | Swing | | |
| Labour hold | | Swing | | |

=== Thames View ===
Thames View (2)
| Party | Candidate | Votes | % | ±% |
|---|---|---|---|---|
| Labour | Fatuma Nalule* | 701 | 69.3 | N/A |
| Labour | Sabbir Zamee | 633 | 62.5 | N/A |
| Conservative | Andrew Boff | 263 | 26.0 | N/A |
| CPA | Lucy Baiye-Gaman | 91 | 9.0 | N/A |
| TUSC | Akhter Khan | 75 | 7.4 | N/A |
| Turnout | | 1,013 | 28.4 | N/A |
| Registered electors | | 3,558 | | |
| Labour win (new seat) | | | | |
| Labour win (new seat) | | | | |

=== Valence ===
Valence (3)
| Party | Candidate | Votes | % | ±% |
|---|---|---|---|---|
| Labour | Jane Jones* | 1,514 | 71.8 | N/A |
| Labour | Maureen Worby* | 1,403 | 66.6 | N/A |
| Labour | Syed Ghani* | 1,358 | 64.4 | N/A |
| Conservative | Kevin Londeno | 570 | 27.0 | N/A |
| Turnout | | 2,108 | 21.3 | N/A |
| Registered electors | | 9,811 | | |
| Labour hold | | Swing | | |
| Labour hold | | Swing | | |
| Labour hold | | Swing | | |

=== Village ===
Village (3)
| Party | Candidate | Votes | % | ±% |
|---|---|---|---|---|
| Labour | Margaret Mullane* | 1,690 | 76.2 | N/A |
| Labour | Lee Waker* | 1,675 | 75.5 | N/A |
| Labour | Phil Waker* | 1,647 | 74.2 | N/A |
| Conservative | James Beris | 471 | 21.2 | N/A |
| Conservative | Vincent Williams | 431 | 19.4 | N/A |
| Turnout | | 2,219 | 26.2 | N/A |
| Registered electors | | 8,429 | | |
| Labour hold | | Swing | | |
| Labour hold | | Swing | | |
| Labour hold | | Swing | | |

=== Whalebone ===
Whalebone (3)
| Party | Candidate | Votes | % | ±% |
|---|---|---|---|---|
| Labour | Glenda Paddle* | 1,698 | 70.1 | N/A |
| Labour | Andrew Achilleos* | 1,687 | 69.7 | N/A |
| Labour | Mukhtar Yusuf | 1,441 | 59.5 | N/A |
| Conservative | Subhash Nair | 709 | 29.3 | N/A |
| Turnout | | 2,421 | 27.2 | N/A |
| Registered electors | | 8,830 | | |
| Labour hold | | Swing | | |
| Labour hold | | Swing | | |
| Labour hold | | Swing | | |

== Post-election ==
=== Affiliation changes ===
| Affiliation | Councillors | | |
| Affiliation | Elected in 2022 | Current | Difference |
|---|---|---|---|
| Labour | 51 | 47 | ▼4 |
| Green | 0 | 3 | ▲3 |
| Independent | 0 | 1 (Note: Councillor Lynda Rice was elected as a Labour candidate and changed to Independent.) | ▲1 |
| Total | 51 | 51 | Steady |

== By-elections between 2022 and 2026 ==
Heath by-election, 30 March 2023 (1 seat)
| Party | Candidate | Votes | % | ±% |
|---|---|---|---|---|
| Labour | Harriet Spoor | 777 | 62.1 | −11.7 |
| Conservative | Joe Lynch | 408 | 32.6 | +6.4 |
| Green | Kim Arrowsmith | 41 | 3.3 | +3.3 |
| Liberal Democrats | Zygimantas Adomavicius | 26 | 2.1 | +2.1 |
| Majority | | 369 | 29.5 | |
| Turnout | | 1,252 | 21.8 | −1.3 |
| Registered electors | | 5,774 | | |
| Labour hold | | Swing | | |

The by-election was called following the death of Cllr Olawale Martins.

Mayesbrook by-election, 14 September 2023 (1 seat)
| Party | Candidate | Votes | % | ±% |
|---|---|---|---|---|
| Labour | Summya Sohaib | 632 | 46.8 | −22.9 |
| Conservative | Sharfaraz Raj | 444 | 32.9 | +2.6 |
| Green | Simon Anthony | 192 | 14.2 | +14.2 |
| Liberal Democrats | Olumide Adeyefa | 81 | 6.0 | +6.0 |
| Majority | | 188 | 13.9 | |
| Turnout | | 1,349 | 14.2 | −6.4 |
| Registered electors | | 9,542 | | |
| Labour hold | | Swing | | |

The by-election was called following the resignation of Cllr Nashitha Choudhury.

Northbury by-election, 28 November 2024 (1 seat)
| Party | Candidate | Votes | % | ±% |
|---|---|---|---|---|
| Labour | Val Masson | 561 | 57.7 | −11.1 |
| Green | Simon Anthony | 161 | 16.6 | +2.1 |
| Reform | Ryan Edwards | 101 | 10.4 | +10.4 |
| Conservative | Angelica Olawepo | 100 | 10.3 | −6.4 |
| Liberal Democrats | Olumide Adeyefa | 49 | 5.0 | +5.0 |
| Majority | | 400 | 41.2 | |
| Turnout | | 972 | | |
| Labour hold | | Swing | | |

The by-election was called following the resignation of Cllr Darren Rodwell.

Village by-election, 28 November 2024 (2 seats)
| Party | Candidate | Votes | % | ±% |
|---|---|---|---|---|
| Labour | Julia Williams | 776 | | |
| Labour | Ajanta Roy | 774 | | |
| Conservative | Ben Suter | 580 | | |
| Conservative | Graham Gosling | 571 | | |
| Green | Kim Arrowsmith | 103 | | |
| Green | Tope Olawoyin | 97 | | |
| Liberal Democrats | George Elebiju | 70 | | |
| Liberal Democrats | Herbert Munangatire | 37 | | |
| Labour hold | | Swing | | |
| Labour hold | | Swing | | |

The by-election was called following the resignation of Cllr Margaret Mullane and the death of Cllr Lee Waker.

Whalebone by-election, 20 February 2025 (1 seat)
| Party | Candidate | Votes | % | ±% |
|---|---|---|---|---|
| Labour | Rubina Siddiqui | 625 | 54.9 | |
| Conservative | Angelica Olawepo | 287 | 25.2 | |
| Green | Tope Olawoyin | 117 | 10.3 | |
| Liberal Democrats | Herbert Munangatire | 109 | 9.6 | |
| Majority | | 338 | 29.7 | |
| Turnout | | 1,138 | | |
| Labour hold | | Swing | | |

The by-election was called following the death of Cllr Glenda Paddle.

Thames View by-election, 31 July 2025 (1 seat)
| Party | Candidate | Votes | % | ±% |
|---|---|---|---|---|
| Labour | Lucy Lee | 334 | 36.1 | −25.9 |
| Green | Paul Powlesland | 277 | 29.9 | +29.9 |
| Reform | Lewis Holmes | 197 | 21.3 | +21.3 |
| Conservative | Andrew Boff | 117 | 12.6 | −10.7 |
| Majority | | 57 | 6.2 | |
| Turnout | | 925 | | |
| Labour hold | | Swing | | |

The by-election was called following the resignation of Cllr Fatuma Nalule.
