= Barking Riverside (ward) =

Electoral ward in the London Borough of Barking and Dagenham, England

- Electoral ward for the Barking and Dagenham London Borough Council
- Barking Riverside ward boundaries since 2022
- Borough: Barking and Dagenham
- County: Greater London
- Population: 9,955 (2021) (Note: 2021 Census data reported for 2022 ward boundaries)
- Electorate: 6,037 (2022)
- Major settlements: Barking Riverside
- Area: 5.039 square kilometres (1.946 sq mi)

Current electoral ward
- Created: 2022
- Number of members: 3
- Councillors: Josie Channer; Cameron Geddes; Marion Hull
- Created from: Thames
- GSS code: E05014055

Barking Riverside is an electoral ward in the London Borough of Barking and Dagenham. The ward was first used in the 2022 elections. It returns three councillors to Barking and Dagenham London Borough Council.

== List of councillors ==
Term	Councillor	Party
2022–present	Josie Channer	Labour
2022–present	Cameron Geddes	Labour
2022–2026	Victoria Hornby (Note: Victoria Hornby changed parties in 2025)	Labour
2022–2026	Victoria Hornby	Green
2026–present	Marion Hull	Labour

== Barking and Dagenham council elections ==
=== 2026 election ===
The election took place on 7 May 2026.

2026 Barking and Dagenham London Borough Council election: Barking Riverside
Party	Candidate	Votes	%	±%
Labour	Josie Channer	930	39.5	
Labour	Cameron Geddes	918	39.0	
Labour	Marion Hull	823	35.0	
Green	Victoria Hornby	801	34.0	
Green	Mizanur Rahman	789	33.5	
Green	Godfrey Sekisonge	668	28.4	
Reform	Jim Holland	395	16.8	
Reform	Ion Talambuta	329	14.0	
Reform	Ion Uraschi	324	13.8	
Conservative	Mohammad Uddin	179	7.6	
Conservative	Helal Talukder	169	7.2	
Conservative	Musammat Khanam	146	6.2	
CPA	Gabriel Abe	143	6.1	
Liberal Democrats	Syed Kazmi	86	3.6	
Turnout		2,353	28.3	+3.8
Registered electors		8,300		
Labour hold		Swing		
Labour hold		Swing		
Labour hold		Swing		

=== 2022 election ===
The election took place on 5 May 2022.

2022 Barking and Dagenham London Borough Council election: Barking Riverside (3)
Party	Candidate	Votes	%	±%
Labour	Josie Channer	923	23.7	N/A
Labour	Cameron Geddes	893	22.9	N/A
Labour	Victoria Hornby	890	22.8	N/A
Conservative	Mizanur Rahman	381	9.8	N/A
Conservative	Mohammad Bhuyan	292	7.5	N/A
Conservative	Anthony Oladimeji	291	7.5	N/A
TUSC	Pete Mason	233	6.0	N/A
Turnout		1,491	24.5	N/A
Registered electors		6,037		
Labour win (new seat)				
Labour win (new seat)				
Labour win (new seat)				
