= Eastbrook and Rush Green =

- Electoral ward for the Barking and Dagenham London Borough Council
- Eastbrook and Rush Green ward boundaries since 2022
- Borough: Barking and Dagenham
- County: Greater London
- Population: 7,691 (2021) (Note: 2021 Census data reported for 2022 ward boundaries)
- Electorate: 6,130 (2022)
- Area: 2.845 square kilometres (1.098 sq mi)

Current electoral ward
- Created: 2022
- Number of members: 2
- Councillors: Ron Emin; Ben Suter
- Created from: Eastbrook, Heath
- GSS code: E05014059

Eastbrook and Rush Green is an electoral ward in the London Borough of Barking and Dagenham. The ward was first used in the 2022 elections. It returns two councillors to Barking and Dagenham London Borough Council.

== List of councillors ==
Seat	Councillor	Took office	Left office	Party	Election
1	Princess Bright	2022	2026	Labour	2022
2	Tony Ramsay	2022	2026	Labour	2022
1	Ron Emin	2026	Incumbent	Reform	2026
2	Ben Suter	2026	Incumbent	Reform	2026

== Barking and Dagenham council elections ==
=== 2026 election ===
The election took place on 7 May 2026.

2026 Barking and Dagenham London Borough Council election: Eastbrook and Rush Green
Party	Candidate	Votes	%	±%
Reform	Ron Emin	973	38.2	N/A
Reform	Ben Suter	951	37.3	N/A
Labour	Princess Bright	782	30.7	−20.8
Labour	Amimul Tanim	731	28.7	−20.2
Green	Djena Balde	424	16.6	N/A
Green	Sheikh Nadeem	400	15.7	N/A
Conservative	Neil Hallewell	224	8.8	−26.6
Conservative	James Tyler	215	8.4	−23.1
Independent	Lewis Holmes	143	5.6	N/A
Independent	Ashlea Wane	78	3.0	N/A
Liberal Democrats	Nomsa Munangatire	72	2.8	N/A
Turnout		2,549	40.5	+13.3
Registered electors		6,292		
Reform gain from Labour		Swing	+48.6	
Reform gain from Labour		Swing	+47.4	

=== 2022 election ===
The election took place on 5 May 2022.

2022 Barking and Dagenham London Borough Council election: Eastbrook and Rush Green
Party	Candidate	Votes	%	±%
Labour	Princess Bright	859	26.9	N/A
Labour	Tony Ramsay	816	25.6	N/A
Conservative	Sue Connelly	591	18.5	N/A
Conservative	Emma Lynch	525	16.5	N/A
Independent	Ron Emin	238	7.5	N/A
Independent	Dean Hillyard	160	5.0	N/A
Turnout		1,669	27.2	N/A
Registered electors		6,130		
Labour win (new seat)				
Labour win (new seat)				
