= Thames View (ward) =

- Electoral ward for the Barking and Dagenham London Borough Council
- Thames View ward boundaries since 2022
- Borough: Barking and Dagenham
- County: Greater London
- Population: 6,005 (2021) (Note: 2021 Census data reported for 2022 ward boundaries)
- Electorate: 3,558 (2022)
- Major settlements: Thames View Estate
- Area: 1.587 square kilometres (0.613 sq mi)

Current electoral ward
- Created: 2022
- Number of members: 2
- Councillors: Sabbir Zamee; Lucy Lee
- Created from: Thames
- GSS code: E05014068

Thames View is an electoral ward in the London Borough of Barking and Dagenham. The ward was first used in the 2022 elections. It returns two councillors to Barking and Dagenham London Borough Council.

== List of councillors ==
Term	Councillor	Party
2022–2025	Fatuma Nalule	Labour
2022–present	Sabbir Zamee	Labour
2025–present	Lucy Lee	Labour

== Barking and Dagenham council elections ==
=== 2026 election ===
The election took place on 7 May 2026.

2026 Barking and Dagenham London Borough Council election: Thames View
Party	Candidate	Votes	%	±%
Labour	Lucy Lee	567	42.3	
Labour	Sabbir Zamee	551	41.1	
Green	Emma Grove	392	29.2	
Green	Paul Powlesland	336	25.1	
Reform	Ion Adam	201	15.0	
Reform	Karen Staddon	195	14.5	
Conservative	Andrew Boff	125	9.3	
Conservative	Comfort Adegbulugbe	114	8.5	
CPA	Lucy Baiye-Gaman	41	3.1	
Liberal Democrats	Mine Mayda	34	2.5	
Turnout		1,340	34.8	+6.4
Registered electors		3,848		
Labour hold		Swing		
Labour hold		Swing		

=== 2025 by-election ===
The by-election took place on 31 July 2025, following the resignation of Fatuma Nalule.

2025 Thames View by-election
Party	Candidate	Votes	%	±%
Labour	Lucy Lee	334	36.1	−25.9
Green	Paul Powlesland	277	29.9	New
Reform	Lewis Holmes	197	21.3	New
Conservative	Andrew Boff	117	12.6	−10.7
Turnout		930	23	
Registered electors		3,888		
Labour hold		Swing		

=== 2022 election ===
The election took place on 5 May 2022.

2022 Barking and Dagenham London Borough Council election: Thames View (2)
Party	Candidate	Votes	%	±%
Labour	Fatuma Nalule	701	39.8	N/A
Labour	Sabbir Zamee	633	35.9	N/A
Conservative	Andrew Boff	263	14.9	N/A
CPA	Lucy Baiye-Gaman	91	5.2	N/A
TUSC	Akhter Khan	75	4.3	N/A
Turnout		1,013	28.4	N/A
Registered electors		3,558		
Labour win (new seat)				
Labour win (new seat)				
