= Abbey (Barking and Dagenham ward) =

Electoral ward in London, England

Coordinates: 51.538°N 0.079°E

- Electoral ward for the Barking and Dagenham London Borough Council
- Abbey ward boundaries since 2022
- Borough: Barking and Dagenham
- County: Greater London
- Population: 10,783 (2021) (Note: 2021 Census data reported for 2022 ward boundaries)
- Electorate: 2,802 (2022)
- Major settlements: Barking
- Area: 3.993 km^{2} (1.542 sq mi)

Current electoral ward
- Created: 1965
- Number of members: 1965–1978: 4; 1978–2022: 3; 2022–present: 2
- Councillors: Regina Rahman; Manzoor Hussain
- GSS code: E05000026 (2002–2022); E05013050 (2022–present)
- Name origin: Barking Abbey

Abbey is an electoral ward in the London Borough of Barking and Dagenham. The ward has existed since the creation of the borough on 1 April 1965 and was first used in the 1964 elections. It returns councillors to Barking and Dagenham London Borough Council. The boundaries of the ward were subject to revision in May 1978, April 1994, May 2002 and May 2022.

== Barking and Dagenham council elections since 2022 ==
There was a revision of ward boundaries in Barking and Dagenham in 2022.

=== 2026 election ===
The election took place on 7 May 2026.

2026 Barking and Dagenham London Borough Council election: Abbey (2)
Party	Candidate	Votes	%	±%
Labour	Manzoor Hussain	478	38.42	
Labour	Regina Rahman	457	36.73	
Green	Shazia Majeed	414	33.28	
Green	Verinder Singh	406	32.64	
Reform	Natasha Caulfield	166	13.34	
Conservative	Eshan Attiq	158	12.70	
Reform	Craig Pullen	141	11.33	
Conservative	Kazi Reza	138	11.09	
Liberal Democrats	Malik Rabbani	52	4.18	
Turnout		1,244	31.91	
Labour hold		Swing		
Labour hold		Swing		

=== 2022 election ===
The election took place on 5 May 2022.

2022 Barking and Dagenham London Borough Council election: Abbey (2)
Party	Candidate	Votes	%	±%
Labour	Regina Rahman	503	36.8	N/A
Labour	Manzoor Hussain	470	34.4	N/A
Green	Annabel Allam	148	10.8	N/A
Green	Michael Gold	135	9.9	N/A
Conservative	Ada Echedom	110	8.1	N/A
Turnout		749	26.6	N/A
Registered electors		2,802		
Labour win (new boundaries)				
Labour win (new boundaries)				

== 2002–2022 Barking and Dagenham council elections ==
Abbey ward boundaries from 2002 to 2022

There was a revision of ward boundaries in Barking and Dagenham in 2002.

=== 2018 election ===
At the 2018 election, Laila Butt, Darren Rodwell and Giasuddin Miah, all of the Labour Party, were elected for a four-year term in office; Rodwell is the leader of the council. The election took place on 3 May 2018.

2018 Barking and Dagenham London Borough Council election: Abbey (3)
Party	Candidate	Votes	%	±%
Labour	Laila Butt	2,169	29.3	+3.1
Labour	Darren Rodwell	2,086	28.2	N/A
Labour	Giasuddin Miah	2,043	27.6	+4.7
Conservative	Archana Wankhade	382	5.2	N/A
Conservative	Syed Naqvi	360	4.9	N/A
Conservative	Kresan Panchardacharam	353	4.8	N/A
Turnout		2,773	30.0	−6.9
Registered electors		9,257		
Labour hold		Swing		
Labour hold		Swing		
Labour hold		Swing		

=== 2014 election ===
The election took place on 22 May 2014.

2014 Barking and Dagenham London Borough Council election: Abbey (3)
Party	Candidate	Votes	%	±%
Labour	Laila Butt	2,252	26.2	N/A
Labour	Danielle Doyle	2,072	24.1	N/A
Labour	Giasuddin Miah	1,966	22.9	N/A
UKIP	Tariq Saeed	947	7.5	N/A
Conservative	Modoris Ali	410	4.8	N/A
Conservative	Emran Chowdhury	323	3.8	N/A
Green	Natalija Kitkovska	307	3.6	N/A
Conservative	Amaniampong Ampomah	292	3.4	N/A
Liberal Democrats	Ryan Edwards	221	2.6	N/A
Independent	Ostafe Marius-Alexandru	94	1.1	N/A
Turnout		3,193	36.8	−21.2
Registered electors		8,672		
Labour hold		Swing		
Labour hold		Swing		
Labour hold		Swing		

=== 2010 election ===
The election on 6 May 2010 took place on the same day as the United Kingdom general election.

2010 Barking and Dagenham London Borough Council election: Abbey (3)
Party	Candidate	Votes	%	±%
Labour	Laila Butt	3,412	67.1	+2.8
Labour	Manzoor Hussain	3,139		
Labour	Tariq Saeed	3,122		
Conservative	John Taylor	671	13.2	−22.5
Conservative	Mohammed Iqbal	650		
Liberal Democrats	Anthony Gomes	603	11.9	N/A
Conservative	Shahidur Rahman	546		
BNP	Brian John Tunney	326	6.4	N/A
Independent	Zakir Parvaj	72	1.4	N/A
Turnout		4,712	58.0	+28.1
Registered electors		8,110		
Labour hold		Swing		
Labour hold		Swing		
Labour hold		Swing		

=== 2006 election ===
The election took place on 4 May 2006.

2006 Barking and Dagenham London Borough Council election: Abbey (3)
Party	Candidate	Votes	%	±%
Labour	Jeanne Alexander	1,367	64.3	−5.8
Labour	Mohammed Fani	1,275		
Labour	Graham Bramley	1,241		
Conservative	Foyzur Rahman	765	35.7	N/A
Turnout		2,203	29.9	+7.0
Registered electors		7,379		
Labour hold		Swing		
Labour hold		Swing		
Labour hold		Swing		

=== 2002 election ===
The election took place on 2 May 2002.

2002 Barking and Dagenham London Borough Council election: Abbey (3)
Party	Candidate	Votes	%	±%
Labour	Jeanne Alexander	997	70.1	−1.1
Labour	Graham Bramley	921		
Labour	Mohammed Fani	895		
Liberal Democrats	Brian Beadle	426	29.9	+1.1
Liberal Democrats	June Griffin	387		
Liberal Democrats	Margaret Tester	354		
Turnout		1,536	22.9	−4.4
Registered electors		3,580		
Labour win (new boundaries)				
Labour win (new boundaries)				
Labour win (new boundaries)				

== 1978–2002 Barking and Dagenham council elections ==
Abbey ward boundaries from 1978 to 1994

There was a revision of ward boundaries in Barking in 1978. The name of the borough and council changed from Barking to Barking and Dagenham on 1 January 1980. There was a minor adjustment of the ward and the Newham/Redbridge borough boundaries on 1 April 1994. The most significant change transferred a mostly unpopulated area from Little Ilford and Wall End wards in Newham to the Abbey ward in Barking and Dagenham and realigned the western boundary to the North Circular Road.

=== 1998 election ===
The election took place on 7 May 1998.

1998 Barking and Dagenham London Borough Council election: Abbey (3)
Party	Candidate	Votes	%	±%
Labour	Jeannette Alexander	1,223	71.2	+9.9
Labour	Graham Bramley	1,054		
Labour	Mohammed Fani	976		
Liberal Democrats	Brian Beadle	495	28.8	+26.7
Liberal Democrats	Sheila Clay	453		
Liberal Democrats	Siobhan Jebb	349		
Turnout		1,901	27.3	+12.4
Registered electors		6,958		
Labour hold		Swing		
Labour hold		Swing		
Labour hold		Swing		

=== 1994 election ===
The election took place on 5 May 1994.

1994 Barking and Dagenham London Borough Council election: Abbey (3)
Party	Candidate	Votes	%	±%
Labour	Jeannette L. Alexander	1,601	61.3	−4.5
Labour	Graham J. Bramley	1,562		
Labour	Mohammed A. R. Fani	1,403		
Independent	Narain C. Kaul	476	18.2	N/A
Liberal Democrats	Claire D. Stepton	317	12.1	−4.3
Liberal Democrats	Anthony D. Stepton	310		
Liberal Democrats	Margaret L. Tester	273		
Conservative	John J. Stavers	217	8.3	−9.5
Conservative	Danielle Whitton	202		
Conservative	Robert D. Whitton	183		
Turnout		2,662	39.7	+4.5
Registered electors		6,700		
Labour hold		Swing		
Labour hold		Swing		
Labour hold		Swing		

=== 1990 election ===
The election took place on 3 May 1990.

1990 Barking and Dagenham London Borough Council election: Abbey (3)
Party	Candidate	Votes	%	±%
Labour	Terence M. Bird	1,678	65.8	+10.9
Labour	Graham J. Bramley	1,581		
Labour	Mohammed A. R. Fani	1,449		
Conservative	Danielle Flynn	454	17.8	+1.3
Liberal Democrats	Robert F. Porter	417	16.4	−3.7
Turnout		2,455	35.2	−1.9
Registered electors		6,983		
Labour hold		Swing		
Labour hold		Swing		
Labour hold		Swing		

=== 1986 election ===
The election took place on 8 May 1986.

1986 Barking and Dagenham London Borough Council election: Abbey (3)
Party	Candidate	Votes	%	±%
Labour	Terence M. Bird	1,330	54.9	+2.7
Labour	Graham J. Bramley	1,329		
Labour	Abdul M. Khokhar	1,155		
Alliance	Brian B. Beadle	488	20.1	−4.2
Alliance	Martin F. Taylor	421		
Conservative	Reginald D. Knowles	399	16.5	−7.0
Alliance	Charlotte R. Winters	368		
Independent	Derek C. Newcombe	207	8.5	N/A
Independent	Barbara E. C. Newcombe	204		
Turnout			37.1	−2.4
Registered electors		6,661		
Labour hold		Swing		
Labour hold		Swing		
Labour hold		Swing		

=== 1982 election ===
The election took place on 6 May 1982.

1982 Barking and Dagenham London Borough Council election: Abbey (3)
Party	Candidate	Votes	%	±%
Labour	Jean E. M. Bruce	1,210	52.2	−1.5
Labour	Horace J. Howie	1,199		
Labour	Graham J. Bramley	1,109		
Alliance	Frederick C. Edgecombe	563	24.3	+9.9
Alliance	Terence P. Power	548		
Conservative	Malcolm A. Maugey	545	23.5	+4.8
Conservative	Frederick J. Tisdell	541		
Conservative	Olive E. Tisdell	482		
Turnout			39.5	−2.1
Registered electors		6,535		
Labour hold		Swing		
Labour hold		Swing		
Labour hold		Swing		

=== 1978 election ===
The election took place on 4 May 1978.

1978 Barking London Borough Council election: Abbey (3)
Party	Candidate	Votes	%	±%
Labour	Jean E. Bruce	1,474	53.7	−2.0
Labour	Sydney Hamilton	1,470		N/A
Labour	Horace J. Howie	1,447		N/A
Conservative	Brian Cook	776	28.3	+10.4
Liberal	Ronwen R. Beadle	312	11.4	−15.0
Liberal	Angela E. Bush	297		N/A
National Front	Keith R. Taylor	182	6.6	N/A
National Front	Sandra Hatchman	160		N/A
National Front	Stanley W. Pulfer	153		N/A
Turnout			41.6	+9.8
Registered electors		6,827		
Labour win (new boundaries)				
Labour win (new boundaries)				
Labour win (new boundaries)				

== 1964–1978 Barking council elections ==
External image
- Map showing Abbey ward boundaries from 1965 to 1978

=== 1974 election ===
The election took place on 2 May 1974.

1974 Barking London Borough Council election: Abbey (4)
Party	Candidate	Votes	%	±%
Labour	J Bruce	1,959	55.7	−0.2
Labour	H Howie	1,956		N/A
Labour	J Longden	1,899		N/A
Labour	A Puddefoot	1,891		N/A
Liberal	A Beadle	926	26.4	+17.6
Liberal	M Taylor	905		N/A
Liberal	D Keenan	820		N/A
Liberal	M Staines	817		N/A
Conservative	C Martin	629	17.9	−4.5
Conservative	A Gray	623		N/A
Conservative	J Barnett	594		N/A
Conservative	W Williamson	575		N/A
Turnout			31.8	−4.2
Registered electors		10,691		
Labour hold		Swing		
Labour hold		Swing		
Labour hold		Swing		
Labour hold		Swing		

=== 1971 election ===
The election took place on 13 May 1971.

1971 Barking London Borough Council election: Abbey (4)
Party	Candidate	Votes	%	±%
Labour	M Bredo	2,459	55.9	+23.9
Labour	A Howie	2,434		N/A
Labour	J Tweed	2,317		N/A
Labour	J Longden	2,278		N/A
Conservative	E Lacey	984	22.4	−31.4
Conservative	E Reed	829		N/A
Conservative	R Trew	824		N/A
Conservative	J Willmott	822		N/A
Conservative Party (Unofficial)	T Woodcock	567	12.9	N/A
Liberal	A Beadle	386	8.8	−5.4
Liberal	D Wade	328		N/A
Liberal	G Poole	258		N/A
Liberal	M Taylor	254		N/A
Turnout			36.0	−0.3
Registered electors		10,248		
Labour gain from Conservative		Swing		
Labour gain from Conservative		Swing		
Labour gain from Conservative		Swing		
Labour gain from Conservative		Swing		

=== 1968 election ===
The election took place on 9 May 1968.

1968 Barking London Borough Council election: Abbey (4)
Party	Candidate	Votes	%	±%
Conservative	T Woodcock	1,749	53.8	+18.2
Conservative	E Eden	1,746		N/A
Conservative	J Willmott	1,732		N/A
Conservative	R Hawken	1,685		N/A
Labour	L Henstock	1,042	32.0	−15.9
Labour	M Bredo	1,038		N/A
Labour	S Silvell	948		N/A
Labour	J Ward	884		N/A
Liberal	D Wade	462	14.2	−2.2
Liberal	J Tyrell	400		N/A
Liberal	R Litchfield	361		N/A
Liberal	B Nicholls	329		N/A
Turnout			35.7	−1.4
Registered electors		9,275		
Conservative gain from Labour		Swing		
Conservative gain from Labour		Swing		
Conservative gain from Labour		Swing		
Conservative gain from Labour		Swing		

=== 1964 election ===
The election took place on 7 May 1964.

1964 Barking London Borough Council election: Abbey (4)
Party	Candidate	Votes	%	±%
Labour	M. Bredo	1,838	47.9	N/A
Labour	L. F. Henstock	1,835		N/A
Labour	S. C. Sivell	1,759		N/A
Labour	J. Callan	1,741		N/A
Conservative	V. H. Pool	1,366	35.6	N/A
Conservative	H. Hamshere	1,357		N/A
Conservative	A. Gray	1,331		N/A
Conservative	M. Taylor	1,292		N/A
Liberal	A. R. Beadle	630	16.4	N/A
Liberal	H. Claxton	582		N/A
Liberal	J. D. Tyrrell	568		N/A
Liberal	W. Duckworth	466		N/A
Turnout		3,864	37.1	N/A
Registered electors		10,428		
Labour win (new seat)				
Labour win (new seat)				
Labour win (new seat)				
Labour win (new seat)				
