= Andrew Boff =

British politician (born 1958)

Councillor Andrew Boff AM
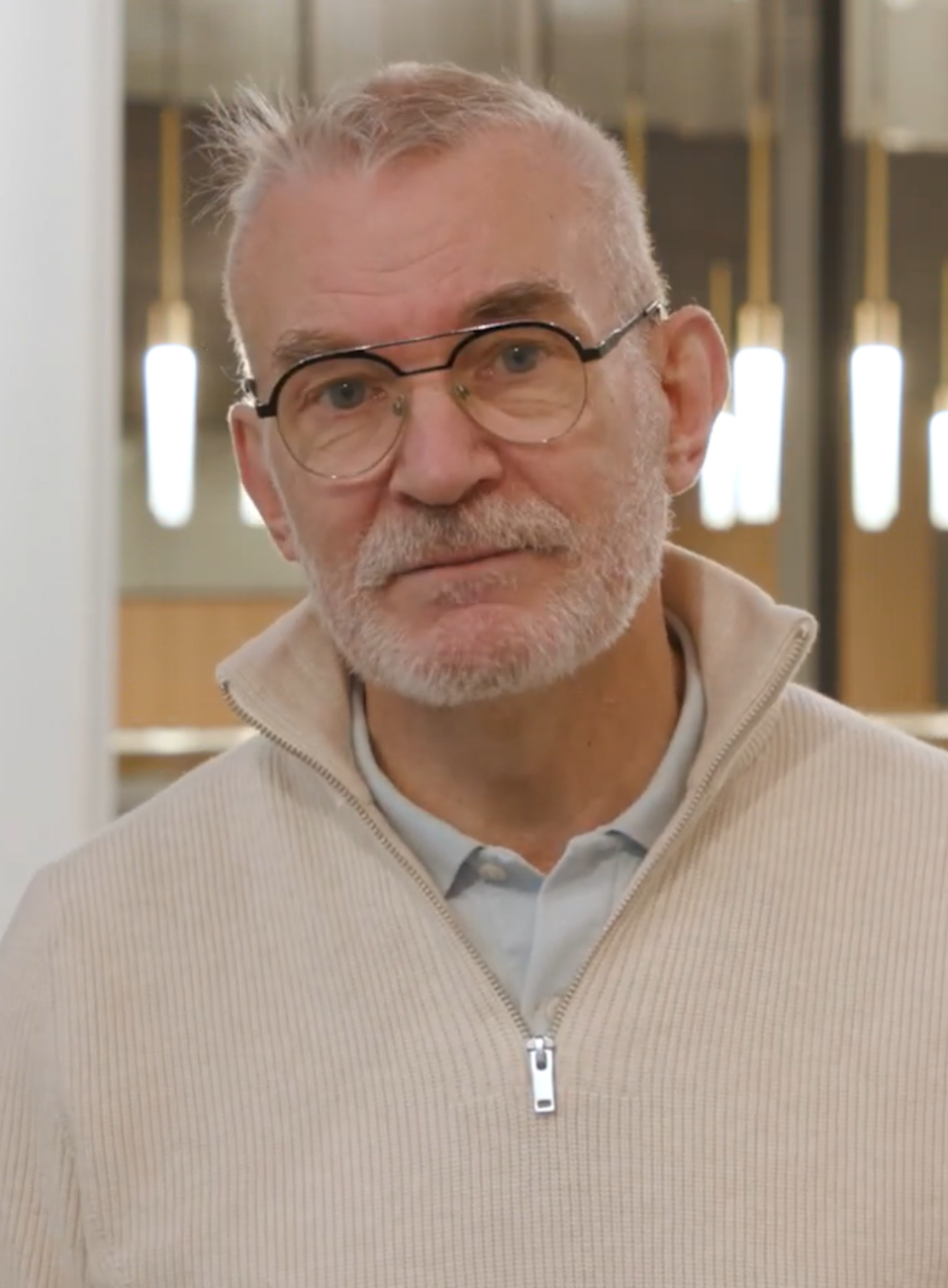
- Boff in 2025

Chair of the London Assembly
- Incumbent
- Assumed office 11 May 2026
- Deputy: Len Duvall
- Preceded by: Len Duvall
- In office 4 May 2023 – 6 May 2025
- Deputy: Onkar Sahota; Len Duvall
- Preceded by: Onkar Sahota
- Succeeded by: Len Duvall
- In office 18 May 2021 – 9 May 2022
- Deputy: Keith Prince
- Preceded by: Navin Shah
- Succeeded by: Onkar Sahota

Deputy Chair of the London Assembly
- In office 6 May 2025 – 11 May 2026
- Preceded by: Len Duvall
- Succeeded by: Len Duvall
- In office 9 May 2022 – 4 May 2023
- Preceded by: Keith Prince
- Succeeded by: Onkar Sahota

Leader of the Conservative Party in the London Assembly
- In office 14 June 2012 – October 2015
- Preceded by: James Cleverly
- Succeeded by: Gareth Bacon

Member of the London Assembly as an additional member
- Incumbent
- Assumed office 1 May 2008

Personal details
- Born: 14 April 1958 (age 68) Uxbridge, Middlesex, England
- Party: Conservative (until 2026) Independent (since 2026)
- Domestic partner: Gareth Carey
- Occupation: Politician
- Profession: IT consultant
- Website: Andrew Boff official website

Andrew Boff (born 14 April 1958) is a British politician who has been chair of the London Assembly since May 2026. Boff was previously chair of the London Assembly between May 2023 and 2025, and from 2021 to 2022. A member of the Conservative Party until 2026, he has served as a London-wide Assembly Member (AM) since the 2008 election. Boff served as Leader of the Conservatives in the London Assembly from June 2012 to October 2015.

Andrew Boff was a supporter of the "Yes! To fairer votes" campaign in the 2011 UK Alternative Vote referendum. He was the Conservative representative at a "Yes!" event in London on 3 May 2011. Boff has unsuccessfully sought to become the Conservative candidate for Mayor of London on six occasions, most recently failing to gain the nomination for the 2024 election. He sought the nomination again for the 2028 election, but was blocked by the Conservative party due to his support for the European Court of Human Rights, leading him to resign from the party in October 2026 to sit as an independent.

== Political career ==
=== Early career ===
Born in Uxbridge in 1958 and active in politics since the 1970s, Boff was a Young Conservative branch founder whilst still at school; in 1976 he proposed the legalisation of cannabis at a Young Conservative national conference. His mother Elsie was already a councillor when he was elected a councillor in Hillingdon in 1982. He later served as Leader of the Council between 1990 and 1992. In 1992, he stepped down to stand for Parliament, defending the marginal Hornsey and Wood Green constituency. He lost the seat to Labour's Barbara Roche with 39.2% of the vote.

Boff stood in the safe Labour seat of London South Inner in the 1994 election to the European Parliament. He was placed seventh on the Conservative list in London in the 1999 European Parliament election. He failed to be elected both times.

=== London Assembly ===
Boff became known in London politics after he contested the Conservative nomination for the London mayoral elections in 2000, 2004 and 2008. He came second in 2000 behind Steven Norris. He came second again in 2008. In summer 2018, Boff launched another campaign to be the Conservative candidate for Mayor of London in 2021. He was shortlisted along with Joy Morrissey and fellow London Assembly Member Shaun Bailey. Boff finished once again in second place with 35% of first round votes, an increase of 31 percentage points on his run for the nomination in 2015 for the 2016 election.

Boff was placed first on the Conservative top-up list for the London Assembly in 2008, comfortably winning a seat. He was re-elected in 2012, 2016 and 2021. He ran for the chairmanship of the assembly in 2010, with the backing of the eleven Conservative members, but lost to Liberal Democrat Dee Doocey, who received the backing of the fourteen other members, including Richard Barnbrook. After his first re-election to the London Assembly, Boff was elected as the GLA Conservative Group Leader. He was succeeded by Gareth Bacon in October 2015.

In September 2015, Boff called for a managed street prostitution zone to be set up in East London in order to protect sex workers from harm.

In 2019, Boff became Chairman of the Confirmation Hearings Committee and the Planning Committee. In May 2021, he was elected Chairman of the London Assembly. In May 2022, he became Deputy Chairman of the London Assembly.

=== Hackney politics ===
He has stood for office numerous times in Hackney, where he lived. He received the Conservative nomination for the elections in 2002 and 2006 to elect the Mayor of Hackney, but came second both times. He was the Conservatives' London Assembly candidate for the North East constituency in 2004, but came third, behind the candidates from both Labour and the Liberal Democrats.

He achieved success in Hackney in 2005, when he won the supposedly safe Labour seat of Queensbridge in a council by-election, before losing it at the 2006 Hackney Council election, albeit with a vote tripled from the previous borough election.

Boff stood for Mayor of Hackney for a third time in 2010. A booklet containing election statements from every candidate except him was distributed to every voter in the borough. It excluded Boff owing to the council's confusion over whether the statements he made about the cost of the mayoralty were legally admissible. By the time they decided that they were, it was too late to print, and the council compounded the problem by telling voters who enquired that Boff was not running. In the contest, Boff fell to third place, behind the Labour incumbent and the Liberal Democrats.

=== Barking and Dagenham politics ===
Boff unsuccessfully stood for the ward of Thames at the 2014 Barking and Dagenham elections and for the ward of Longbridge at the 2018 elections. He unsuccessfully stood at the 2021 Thames by-election. He stood unsuccessfully for the ward of Thames View at the 2022 elections and the 2025 Thames View by-election.

=== Mayoral runs and departure from the Conservatives ===
Boff has unsuccessfully sought to become the Conservative candidate for Mayor of London on six occasions, most recently failing to gain the nomination for the 2024 election. He was again seeking the nomination for the 2028 election. His candidacy was rejected by the party due to his support of the UK remaining in the European Court of Human Rights. He left the party on 20 October 2026 in response and now sits in the Assembly as an independent member.

== Controversies ==
On 3 October 2023, Boff was marched out of the Conservative Party Conference by Greater Manchester Police after vocally expressing his disapproval of a speech by then Home Secretary, Suella Braverman, which he reportedly referred to as a "homophobic rant" and "tripe".

He was wearing a T-shirt reading "Trans Rights Are Human Rights," Boff interrupted the session, calling it "one-sided" and "curated hatred" for failing to include any trans speakers or opposing viewpoints. He challenged the panel’s framing of trans issues, asking "Where are the trans people?" before being escorted out of the room.

At the 2025 conference, Boff publicly protested during a panel discussion on gender identity, which featured former Olympian Sharron Davies. He later went on to criticise Kemi Badenoch's leadership of the party, describing it as "awful" and "the most dreadful leader the party has ever had."

== Personal life ==
He is an information technology consultant.

Boff is openly gay. He has stated that his 2005 same-sex civil partnership was "register number 000001", although it was not the first finalised because the 15-day waiting period was waived for a terminally ill man in Worthing.

Boff is a libertarian, and an outspoken proponent of direct democracy, having prominently publicised the issue at London mayoral hustings and on ConservativeHome.

An atheist and a humanist, Boff is a member of Humanists UK. He helped to launch the Conservative Humanist Association, a Conservative Party ginger group, at an event in London in 2008.

On 10 June 2019, Boff ran into a burning tower block in Barking Riverside to help people escape a fire that had broken out.
