= 2018 Barking and Dagenham London Borough Council election =

2018 local election in England

2018 Barking and Dagenham Council election
- 3 May 2018

All 51 council seats
	First party
	Lab
Leader	Darren Rodwell
Party	Labour
Leader since	17 May 2014
Leader's seat	Abbey
Last election	51 seats, 52.0%
Seats won	51
Seat change	Steady
Popular vote	28,974
Percentage	74.4
Swing	▲22.4%
- Map of the results of the 2018 Barking and Dagenham council election. Labour in red.
Leader of Largest Party before election
Labour
Subsequent Leader of Largest Party
Labour

The 2018 Barking and Dagenham Council election took place on 3 May 2018 to elect members of Barking and Dagenham Council in London. This was on the same day as other local elections. The Labour Party won every available council seat for the third election in a row, winning 74% of the popular vote. The Conservatives saw their vote share rise by 13 percentage points, but failed to win any seats.

== Background ==
At the last election in May 2014, Labour won 52% of the vote share, and all 51 seats, but due to defections were reduced to 49 seats. Both Labour and the Conservatives stood candidates in all 17 wards, contesting all 51 seats. The BNP and the Greens were the only two other parties to field candidates, two and one respectively. An independent candidate also stood in Eastbrook. Despite gaining over 26% of the vote and coming second in all wards except Longbridge at the previous election, UKIP did not field any candidates.

== Election results ==
Party	Councillors				Votes		
Party		Of total	Net			Of total	Net
Labour Party	51	100.0%	0	51 / 51	28,974	74.4%	+22.4%
Conservative Party	0	0.0%	0	0 / 51	9,195	23.6%	+13.3%
British National Party	0	0.0%	0	0 / 51	404	1.0%	-0.7%
Independent	0	0.0%	0	0 / 51	372	0.9%	0.0%
Green	0	0.0%	0	0 / 51	317	0.8%	-2.1%

== Ward results ==
=== Abbey ===
Abbey (3 seats)
Party	Candidate	Votes	%	±%
Labour	Laila Butt*	2,169	29.3	+3.1
Labour	Darren Rodwell	2,086	28.2	N/A
Labour	Giasuddin Miah*	2,043	27.6	+4.7
Conservative	Archana Manish Wankhade	382	5.2	N/A
Conservative	Syed Nasir Rara Naqvi	360	4.9	N/A
Conservative	Kresan Panchardacharam	353	4.8	N/A
Turnout		2,773	30.0	−6.9
Registered electors		9,257		
Labour hold		Swing		
Labour hold		Swing		
Labour hold		Swing		

Cllr Butt was suspended by the Labour Party two weeks after the election, but was reinstated after apologising for not declaring an interest in two properties whilst she was responsible for punishing rogue landlords.

=== Alibon ===
Alibon (3 seats)
Party	Candidate	Votes	%	±%
Labour	John Dulwich	1,350	26.1	N/A
Labour	Paul Robinson	1,306	25.2	N/A
Labour	Sanchia Alasia*	1,281	24.7	+3.0
Conservative	Keith Syers	480	9.3	N/A
Conservative	Tariq Saeed	386	7.4	N/A
Conservative	Roma Tahir	377	7.3	N/A
Turnout		1,896	25.6	−8.6
Registered electors		7,397		
Labour hold		Swing		
Labour hold		Swing		
Labour hold		Swing		

=== Becontree ===
Becontree (3 seats)
Party	Candidate	Votes	%	±%
Labour	Evelyn Carpenter*	2,161	29.1	+3.9
Labour	Edna Fergus	2,047	27.5	N/A
Labour	Muhammad Saleem	1,854	25.0	N/A
Conservative	Richard Hall	625	8.4	N/A
Conservative	Mahammad Sajid Khalifa	378	5.1	N/A
Conservative	Syed Baqar Raza Naqvi	364	4.9	N/A
Turnout		2,750	28.3	−8.5
Registered electors		9,707		
Labour hold		Swing		
Labour hold		Swing		
Labour hold		Swing		

=== Chadwell Heath ===
Chadwell Heath (3 seats)
Party	Candidate	Votes	%	±%
Labour	Sade Bright*	1,528	23.4	+3.7
Labour	Simon Perry	1,510	23.1	N/A
Labour	Mohammed Khan	1,447	22.1	N/A
Conservative	Terry Justice	746	11.4	N/A
Conservative	Monica Mohan	653	10.0	N/A
Conservative	Glyn Lewis	651	10.0	N/A
Turnout		2,378	31.9	−4.6
Registered electors		7,454		
Labour hold		Swing		
Labour hold		Swing		
Labour hold		Swing		

=== Eastbrook ===
Eastbrook (3 seats)
Party	Candidate	Votes	%	±%
Labour	Michael McCarthy*	1,586	21.3	−0.4
Labour	Princess Bright	1,418	19.0	N/A
Labour	Tony Ramsay*	1,391	18.6	+0.5
Conservative	Sue Connelly	938	12.6	+5.1
Conservative	Peter Harris	868	11.6	N/A
Conservative	Dewan Chowdhury Mahdi	728	9.8	N/A
Independent	Ron Emin	372	5.0	N/A
BNP	Tony McKay	158	2.1	N/A
Turnout		2,704	33.4	−3.1
Registered electors		8,084		
Labour hold		Swing		
Labour hold		Swing		
Labour hold		Swing		

=== Eastbury ===
Eastbury (3 seats)
Party	Candidate	Votes	%	±%
Labour	Emily Rodwell	1,678	27.4	N/A
Labour	Foyzur Rahman	1,550	25.3	N/A
Labour	Faraaz Shaukat*	1,474	24.1	+2.64
Conservative	David Perry	564	9.2	N/A
Conservative	Alejandro Delos Santos	488	8.0	N/A
Conservative	Manish Wankhade	371	6.1	N/A
Turnout		2,319	28.8	−5.8
Registered electors		8,043		
Labour hold		Swing		
Labour hold		Swing		
Labour hold		Swing		

=== Gascoigne ===
Gascoigne (3 seats)
Party	Candidate	Votes	%	±%
Labour	Saima Ashraf*	1,560	27.6	+0.4
Labour	Abdul Aziz*	1,538	27.2	+3.0
Labour	Dominic Twomey*	1,525	27.0	+0.9
Conservative	Dean Talbot-Wallis	345	6.1	N/A
Conservative	Kirsty Talbot-Wallis	342	6.1	N/A
Conservative	Imran Khan	338	6.0	N/A
Turnout		2,074	29.9	−7.7
Registered electors		6,945		
Labour hold		Swing		
Labour hold		Swing		
Labour hold		Swing		

=== Goresbrook ===
Goresbrook (3 seats)
Party	Candidate	Votes	%	±%
Labour	Simon Bremner*	1,450	25.9	+2.7
Labour	Irma Freeborn*	1,346	24.0	+1.6
Labour	Moin Ali Quadri*	1,250	22.3	+2.6
Conservative	Paul Williams	586	10.5	N/A
Conservative	Md Abu Noman	361	6.4	N/A
Conservative	Nadia Yasin	358	6.4	N/A
BNP	Bede Smith	246	4.4	−8.0
Turnout		2,128	26.4	−8.3
Registered electors		8,047		
Labour hold		Swing		
Labour hold		Swing		
Labour hold		Swing		

=== Heath ===
Heath (3 seats)
Party	Candidate	Votes	%	±%
Labour	Dave Miles*	1,326	24.56	−0.3
Labour	Olawale Martins	1,253	23.2	N/A
Labour	Ingrid Robinson	1,206	22.3	N/A
Conservative	Stephen Beal	486	9.0	N/A
Conservative	Sue Benjamins	423	7.8	N/A
Conservative	Martynas Cekavicius	389	7.2	N/A
Green	Matthew Crowley	317	5.9	N/A
Turnout		2,026	26.0	−8.91
Registered electors		7,779		
Labour hold		Swing		
Labour hold		Swing		
Labour hold		Swing		

=== Longbridge ===
Longbridge (3 seats)
Party	Candidate	Votes	%	±%
Labour	Rocky Gill*	2,724	28.3	+4.3
Labour	Faruk Choudhury	2,582	26.9	N/A
Labour	Lynda Rice*	2,356	24.5	+6.1
Conservative	Andrew Boff	711	7.4	N/A
Conservative	Tilly Wijesuriya	633	6.6	N/A
Conservative	Tamkeen Shaikh	607	6.3	N/A
Turnout		3,549	40.6	−3.1
Registered electors		8,736		
Labour hold		Swing		
Labour hold		Swing		
Labour hold		Swing		

On 24 May 2019 Cllr Gill was suspended from the Labour Party after social media posts indicated he supported The Brexit Party in the 2019 European Elections. He was later reinstated.

=== Mayesbrook ===
Mayesbrook (3 seats)
Party	Candidate	Votes	%	±%
Labour	Toni Bankole	1,352	26.0	N/A
Labour	Kashif Haroon*	1,251	24.1	+4.71
Labour	Ade Oluwole	1,241	23.9	+5.08
Conservative	Andy McNab	541	10.4	N/A
Conservative	Munish Khanna	413	7.9	N/A
Conservative	Cynthia Wijesuriya	395	7.6	N/A
Turnout		1,931	26.9	−7.4
Registered electors		7,175		
Labour hold		Swing		
Labour hold		Swing		
Labour hold		Swing		

=== Parsloes ===
Parsloes (3 seats)
Party	Candidate	Votes	%	±%
Labour	Chris Rice*	1,287	26.4	+1.2
Labour	Elizabeth Kangethe*	1,240	25.4	+1.4
Labour	Dorothy Akwaboah	1,197	24.5	N/A
Conservative	John Gletherow	488	10.0	N/A
Conservative	Farhanaz Mansuri	337	6.9	N/A
Conservative	Syed Naqvi	334	6.8	N/A
Turnout		1,805	25.9	7.2
Registered electors		6,956		
Labour hold		Swing		
Labour hold		Swing		
Labour hold		Swing		

=== River ===
River (3 seats)
Party	Candidate	Votes	%	±%
Labour	Eileen Keller*	1,525	26.8	−0.9
Labour	Peter Chand*	1,513	26.6	−1.1
Labour	Donna Lumsden	1,431	25.2	N/A
Conservative	Robert Baillie	429	7.5	N/A
Conservative	Richard Burleton	420	7.4	N/A
Conservative	Ada Echedom	366	6.4	N/A
Turnout		2,068	28.2	−7.5
Registered electors		7,335		
Labour hold		Swing		
Labour hold		Swing		
Labour hold		Swing		

=== Thames ===
Thames (3 seats)
Party	Candidate	Votes	%	±%
Labour	Josie Channer*	2,020	29.2	+5.1
Labour	Cameron Geddes*	1,930	27.9	+5.2
Labour	Bill Turner*	1,911	27.6	+5.6
Conservative	Amanda Gletherow	413	6.0	N/A
Conservative	Isaac Mukasa	343	5.0	N/A
Conservative	Akhterrasul Shaikh	311	4.5	N/A
Turnout		2,491	28.4	−9.0
Registered electors		8,768		
Labour hold		Swing		
Labour hold		Swing		
Labour hold		Swing		

=== Valence ===
Valence (3 seats)
Party	Candidate	Votes	%	±%
Labour	Jane Jones*	1,579	28.9	+4.9
Labour	Maureen Worby*	1,502	27.5	+4.6
Labour	Syed Feroz Ghani*	1,352	24.7	+4.5
Conservative	Rozeena Zafar	368	19.0	N/A
Conservative	Sumaiyabanu Khalifa	345	6.3	N/A
Conservative	Imran Zahoor	324	6.0	N/A
Turnout		2,003	26.4	−8.4
Registered electors		7,591		
Labour hold		Swing		
Labour hold		Swing		
Labour hold		Swing		

=== Village ===
Village (3 seats)
Party	Candidate	Votes	%	±%
Labour	Margaret Mullane*	1,829	27.70	−3.8
Labour	Lee Waker*	1,767	26.8	−7.1
Labour	Phil Waker*	1,687	25.55	−6.0
Conservative	Vivian Patten	462	7.0	N/A
Conservative	Neil Connelly	439	6.6	N/A
Conservative	Lorraine Harris	420	6.4	N/A
Turnout		2,375	31.2	−8.7
Registered electors		7,606		
Labour hold		Swing		
Labour hold		Swing		
Labour hold		Swing		

=== Whalebone ===
Whalebone (3 seats)
Party	Candidate	Votes	%	±%
Labour	Glenda Paddle	1,850	25.7	N/A
Labour	Andrew Achilleos	1,804	25.1	N/A
Labour	Amardeep Jamu	1,768	24.6	N/A
Conservative	Maire Justice	631	8.8	N/A
Conservative	Richard Kelly	577	8.0	N/A
Conservative	Sunaina Mohan	557	7.7	N/A
Turnout		2,598	32.1	−5.5
Registered electors		8,085		
Labour hold		Swing		
Labour hold		Swing		
Labour hold		Swing		

== By-elections between 2018 and 2022 ==
=== Thames ===
Thames by-election, 6 May 2021
Party	Candidate	Votes	%	±%
Labour	Fatuma Nalule	1,545	44.3	−38.7
Conservative	Andrew Boff	939	27.0	+10.0
Green	Sabbir Zameer	574	15.8	N/A
TUSC	Pete Mason	345	9.5	N/A
CPA	Lucy Baiye-Gaman	158	4.3	N/A
Liberal Democrats	Afzal Munna	81	2.2	N/A
Turnout		3,642	36.3	+7.9
Registered electors		10,075		
Labour hold		Swing		

The by-election was called following the resignation of Councillor Bill Turner.
