= Barking and Dagenham London Borough Council =

Local authority for the London Borough of Barking and Dagenham

Barking and Dagenham Council
- Coat of arms

- Council logo

Type
- Type: London borough council of the London Borough of Barking and Dagenham
- Houses: Unicameral

History
- Founded: 1 April 1965

Leadership
- Mayor: Manzoor Hussain, Labour since 22 May 2026
- Leader: Dominic Twomey, Labour since 18 September 2024
- Chief Executive: Fiona Taylor since April 2022

Structure
- Seats: 51 councillors
- Political groups: Administration (38) Labour (38) Other parties (13) Reform (9) Green (4)
- Joint committees: East London Waste Authority; Thames Chase Joint Committee; Thames Gateway London Partnership; London Councils

Elections
- Voting system: Plurality
- Last election: 7 May 2026
- Next election: May 2030

Meeting place
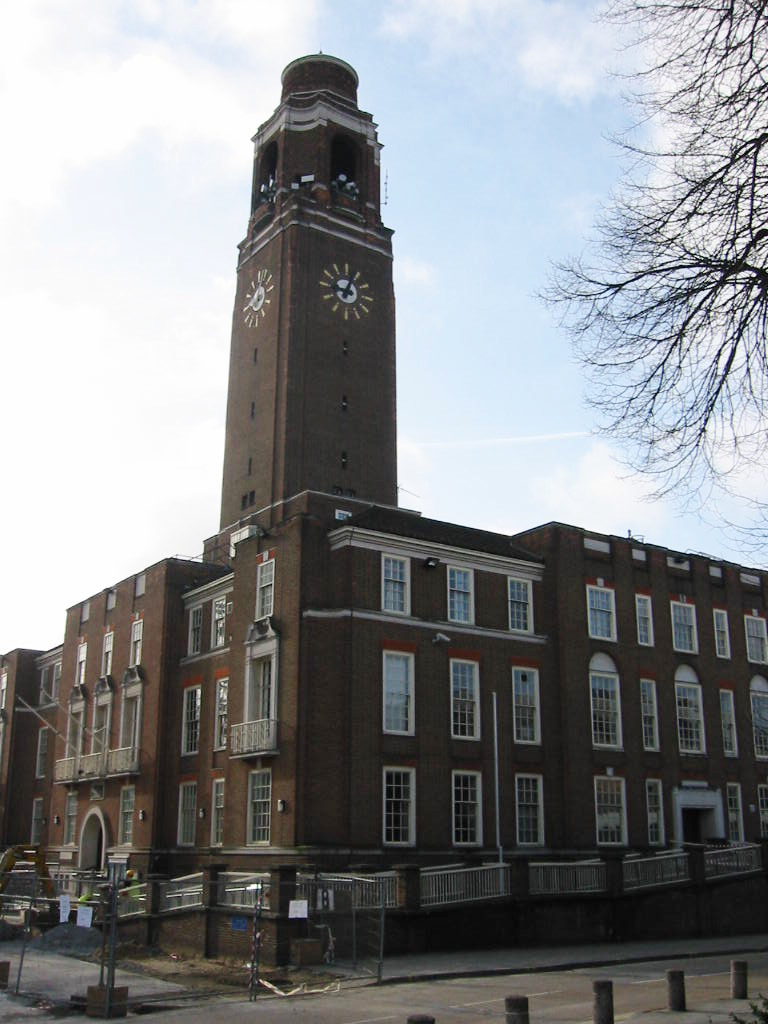
- Town Hall, 1 Town Square, Barking, IG11 7LU

Website
- www.lbbd.gov.uk

Constitution
- The Council Constitution

Barking and Dagenham London Borough Council, also known as Barking and Dagenham Council, is the local authority for the London Borough of Barking and Dagenham in Greater London, England. It is a local education authority, it sets and collects council tax, and provides a range of services in the borough. The council has been under Labour majority control since its creation in 1965. The council was created by the London Government Act 1963 as the Barking London Borough Council and replaced two local authorities: Barking Borough Council and Dagenham Borough Council. The council was renamed on 1 January 1980. It is based at Barking Town Hall in the centre of Barking.

== History ==
The London Borough of Barking (as it was originally named) and its council were created under the London Government Act 1963, with the first election held in 1964. For its first year the council acted as a shadow authority alongside the area's two outgoing authorities, being the borough councils of Dagenham and Barking. The new council formally came into its powers on 1 April 1965, at which point the old districts and their councils were abolished.

The pre-1965 borough of Barking had evolved from the Barking Town local government district, which had been created in 1882 covering the central part of the parish of Barking. The district was governed by an elected local board. Such districts were reconstituted as urban districts under the Local Government Act 1894, which saw the board replaced by an urban district council. The Barking Town Urban District was incorporated to become a municipal borough in 1931, at which point the name was changed from Barking Town to Barking. Neighbouring Dagenham was a rural parish with a parish council from 1894, subordinate to the Romford Rural District Council. In 1926 the parish council was replaced when Dagenham was made an urban district; it was made a municipal borough in 1938.

The council changed the London borough's name from 'Barking' to 'Barking and Dagenham' with effect from 1 January 1980. Since then the council's full legal name has been 'The Mayor and Burgesses of the London Borough of Barking and Dagenham'.

From 1965 until 1986 the council was a lower-tier authority, with upper-tier functions provided by the Greater London Council. The split of powers and functions meant that the Greater London Council was responsible for "wide area" services such as fire, ambulance, flood prevention, and refuse disposal; with the borough councils (including Barking and Dagenham) responsible for "personal" services such as social care, libraries, cemeteries and refuse collection. As an outer London borough council Barking and Dagenham has been a local education authority since 1965. The Greater London Council was abolished in 1986 and its functions passed to the London Boroughs, with some services provided through joint committees.

Since 2000 the Greater London Authority has taken some responsibility for highways and planning control from the council, but within the English local government system the council remains a "most purpose" authority in terms of the available range of powers and functions.

== Powers and functions ==
The local authority derives its powers and functions from the London Government Act 1963 and subsequent legislation, and has the powers and functions of a London borough council. It sets council tax and as a billing authority it also collects precepts for Greater London Authority functions and business rates. It sets planning policies which complement Greater London Authority and national policies, and decides on almost all planning applications accordingly. It is also the local education authority.

== Political control ==
The first election was held in 1964, initially operating as a shadow authority alongside the outgoing authorities until it came into its powers on 1 April 1965. Labour have held a majority of the seats on the council since its creation.

Party in control	Years
Labour	1965–present

=== Leadership ===
Political leadership is provided by the leader of the council. The role of mayor is largely ceremonial in Barking and Dagenham. The leaders since 1965 have been:

Councillor	Party	From	To
Ted Ball	Labour	1965	1972
Joe Butler	Labour	1972	1986
George Brooker	Labour	1986	1998
Charles Fairbrass	Labour	1998	May 2009
Liam Smith	Labour	13 May 2009	May 2014
Darren Rodwell	Labour	12 Jun 2014	Sep 2024
Dominic Twomey	Labour	18 Sep 2024	

== Elections ==
Since the last boundary changes in 2022 the council has comprised 51 councillors representing 19 wards, with each ward electing two or three councillors. Elections are held every four years.

Following the 2026 election, the composition of the council is:

Party	Councillors
Labour	38
Reform	9
Green	4
Total	51

The next full election is due in May 2030.

== Premises ==
The council is based at Barking Town Hall in Town Square. The building was purpose-built for the old Barking Borough Council and was completed in 1958.

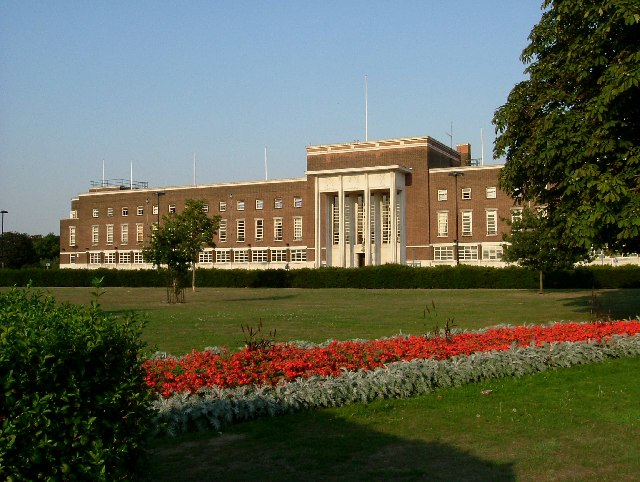
Civic Centre, Dagenham: Council's offices until 2017

The council also inherited from the old Dagenham Borough Council the Civic Centre, which had been built in 1936, in the Becontree Heath area of Dagenham. After the council consolidated its functions at Barking Town Hall, the Dagenham building was disused by the council in 2017 and converted to become a campus of CU London, a higher education institute run by Coventry University.
