= Dagenham and Rainham =

UK Parliament constituency (since 2010)

Coordinates: 51.53°N 0.17°E

- Borough constituency for the House of Commons
- Interactive map of boundaries from 2024
- Location within Greater London
- County: Greater London
- Electorate: 73,627 (March 2020)
- Borough: London Borough of Barking and Dagenham; London Borough of Havering

Current constituency
- Created: 2010
- Member of Parliament: Margaret Mullane (Labour Party)
- Seats: 1
- Created from: Dagenham; Hornchurch; Barking

Dagenham and Rainham is a parliamentary constituency (Note: A borough constituency (for the purposes of election expenses and type of returning officer)) in Greater London that was created in 2010. It has been represented in the House of Commons of the United Kingdom since 2024 by Margaret Mullane and was previously represented from 2010 by Jon Cruddas, both members of the Labour Party.

== Constituency profile ==
Dagenham and Rainham is a mostly suburban constituency located on the outskirts of Greater London. It contains part of the town of Dagenham and the neighbourhoods of Rainham, Becontree Heath and South Hornchurch. The area has an industrial heritage and the population grew rapidly in the interwar period. The Ford Dagenham automotive factory located in the constituency once employed over 40,000 people. High levels of deprivation are present in the constituency, particularly in Dagenham and Becontree Heath.

Residents of the constituency have low levels of education and professional employment compared to the rest of the country. Average income and house prices are similar to nationwide figures but considerably lower than London averages. At the 2021 census, White people made up 58% of the population, similar to the London average. Asians and Black people were 18% each. The increase in ethnic diversity in the area is recent; the proportion of White British people in the Borough of Barking and Dagenham fell by 31.4 percentage points between the 2001 and 2011 censuses, the largest change in the country. At the local borough council level, Dagenham and Becontree Heath are represented by Labour Party councillors, Rainham by Conservatives and South Hornchurch by a local residents' association. Voters in the constituency overwhelmingly supported leaving the European Union in the 2016 referendum; an estimated 70% voted in favour of Brexit, making it one of the top 25 most Brexit-supporting constituencies out of 650 nationwide.

== History ==
Before 1945 the Dagenham area was part of the Romford constituency. The MP for the latter seat since 1935, Labour's John Parker, continued to represent Dagenham until 1983. Parker was the last serving MP to have been elected before the Second World War, and with 48 years in Parliament, was the longest-serving Labour MP in history, a record he held until December 2017. The seat was first contested in the 2010 general election which resulted from the Boundary Commission's report that recommended merging the majority of the former constituencies of Dagenham and Hornchurch and added to existing electoral wards a small part of River ward was also transferred from Barking.

In 2010 Labour's Jon Cruddas took the seat gaining a marginal 5.9% win, facing a strong nominal (ward-by-ward) Lab–Con swing measured against the previous forerunner seats and candidates. BNP candidate Michael Barnbrook came third with 11.2% of the vote, his party's second-best showing in the election. In 2015, Cruddas, incumbent won an 11.6% majority; the runner-up party changed to being UKIP closely followed by the Conservative candidate.

In 2019, Cruddas' majority was cut to just 293 votes, the lowest Labour majority in Dagenham ever, which has been represented by Labour MPs since 1945.

The electoral wards in both boroughs were redrawn in 2022 and subsequently the constituency no longer aligns with ward boundaries.

== Boundaries ==
Map of boundaries 2010–2024

=== 2010–2024 ===
The London Borough of Barking and Dagenham wards of Chadwell Heath, Eastbrook, Heath, River, Village, and Whalebone, and the London Borough of Havering wards of Elm Park, Rainham and Wennington, and South Hornchurch.

=== Current ===
Further to the 2023 review of Westminster constituencies (which was based on ward boundaries in place on 1 December 2020), the Chadwell Heath ward was moved to Ilford South. To compensate, the Barking and Dagenham ward of Valence and parts of the Havering wards of St Andrew's and Hacton (mainly to the west of Abbs Cross Lane and South End Road) were transferred in from the Barking and Hornchurch and Upminster constituencies respectively.

Following these changes, as well as reflecting the 2022 local government reviews, the constituency now comprises the following:

- The London Borough of Barking and Dagenham wards of Alibon (small part), Beam, Chadwell Heath (small part), Eastbrook & Rush Green, Goresbrook (small part), Heath, Parsloes (most), Valence (most), Village, and Whalebone; and
- The London Borough of Havering wards of Beam Park, Elm Park, Hacton (small part), Rainham & Wennington, and South Hornchurch.

== Members of Parliament ==
Election	Member	Party
2010	Jon Cruddas	Labour
2024	Margaret Mullane	Labour

== Election results ==
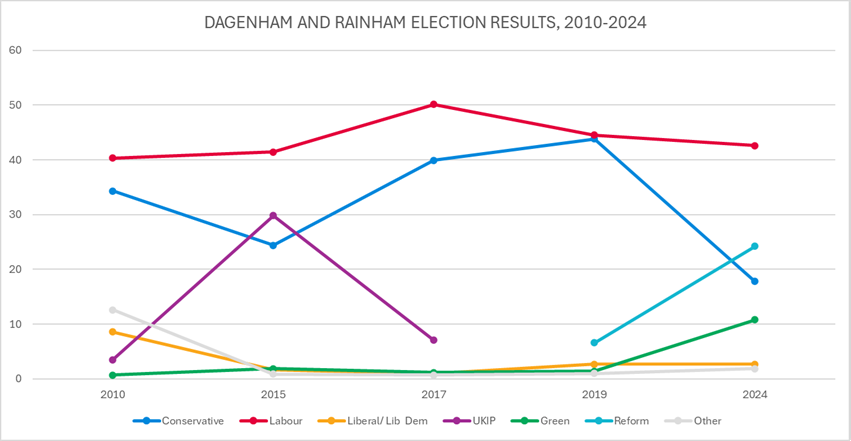
Election results 2010–2024

=== Elections in the 2020s ===
General election 2024: Dagenham and Rainham
Party	Candidate	Votes	%	±%
Labour	Margaret Mullane	16,571	42.6	−2.1
Reform	Kevin Godfrey	9,398	24.2	+17.6
Conservative	Sam Holland	6,926	17.8	−25.3
Green	Kim Arrowsmith	4,184	10.8	+9.2
Liberal Democrats	Francesca Flack	1,033	2.7	−0.4
Independent	Terence London	755	1.9	+1.4
Majority		7,173	18.5	+16.9
Turnout		38,867	50.8	−8.9
Registered electors		76,478		
Labour hold		Swing	−9.8	

=== Elections in the 2010s ===
2019 notional result
Party	Vote	%
Labour	19,676	44.7
Conservative	18,970	43.1
Brexit Party	2,913	6.6
Liberal Democrats	1,338	3.0
Green	674	1.5
Others	421	1.0
Turnout	43,992	59.7
Electorate	73,627	

General election 2019: Dagenham and Rainham
Party	Candidate	Votes	%	±%
Labour	Jon Cruddas	19,468	44.5	−5.6
Conservative	Damian White	19,175	43.8	+3.9
Brexit Party	Tom Bewick	2,887	6.6	N/A
Liberal Democrats	Sam Fisk	1,182	2.7	+1.7
Green	Azzees Minott	602	1.4	+0.2
Independent	Ron Emin	212	0.5	N/A
Independent	Terry London	209	0.5	+0.3
Majority		293	0.7	−9.5
Turnout		43,735	61.6	−3.4
Registered electors		71,045		
Labour hold		Swing	−4.7	

General election 2017: Dagenham and Rainham
Party	Candidate	Votes	%	±%
Labour	Jon Cruddas	22,958	50.1	+8.7
Conservative	Julie Marson	18,306	39.9	+15.6
UKIP	Peter Harris	3,246	7.1	−22.8
Green	Denis Breading	544	1.2	−0.7
Liberal Democrats	Jonathan Fryer	465	1.0	−0.7
BNP	Paul Sturdy	239	0.5	+0.2
Concordia	Terence London	85	0.2	N/A
Majority		4,652	10.1	−1.4
Turnout		45,843	64.9	+2.6
Registered electors		70,616		
Labour hold		Swing	−3.4	

General election 2015: Dagenham and Rainham
Party	Candidate	Votes	%	±%
Labour	Jon Cruddas	17,830	41.4	+1.1
UKIP	Peter Harris	12,850	29.8	+26.3
Conservative	Julie Marson	10,492	24.4	−10.0
Green	Kate Simpson	806	1.9	+1.2
Liberal Democrats	Denise Capstick	717	1.7	−6.9
BNP	Tess Culnane	151	0.4	−10.8
Independent	Terry London	133	0.3	N/A
English Democrat	Kim Gandy	71	0.2	N/A
Majority		4,980	11.6	+5.6
Turnout		43,050	62.3	−1.1
Registered electors		69,128		
Labour hold		Swing	−12.6	

General election 2010: Dagenham and Rainham
Party	Candidate	Votes	%	±%
Labour	Jon Cruddas*	17,813	40.3	−9.3
Conservative	Simon Jones	15,183	34.3	−0.3
BNP	Michael Barnbrook	4,952	11.2	+6.0
Liberal Democrats	Joseph Bourke	3,806	8.6	+1.0
UKIP	Craig Litwin	1,569	3.5	+0.7
Independent	Gordon Kennedy	308	0.7	N/A
Christian	Paula Watson	305	0.7	N/A
Green	Debbie Rosaman	296	0.7	N/A
Majority		2,630	5.9	−9.0
Turnout		44,232	63.4	+7.1
Registered electors		69,764		
Labour hold		Swing	−4.5	

* Served as MP for Dagenham in the 2005–2010 Parliament

2005 notional result
Party	Vote	%
Labour	19,756	49.6
Conservative	13,802	34.7
Liberal Democrats	3,036	7.6
Others	3,226	8.1
Turnout	39,820	56.3
Electorate	70,745	

== See also ==
- List of parliamentary constituencies in London
