= Becontree (ward) =

Electoral ward in the London borough of Barking and Dagenham

Coordinates: 51.553°N 0.1229°E

- Electoral ward for the Barking and Dagenham London Borough Council
- Becontree ward boundaries since 2022
- Borough: Barking and Dagenham
- County: Greater London
- Population: 9,799 (2021) (Note: 2021 Census data reported for 2022 ward boundaries)
- Major settlements: Becontree
- Area: 0.9130 square kilometres (0.3525 sq mi)

Current electoral ward
- Created: 1994
- Number of members: 1994–2002: 2; 2002–2022: 3; 2022–present: 2
- Councillors: Edna Fergus; Muhammad Saleem
- GSS code: E05000028 (2002–2022); E05014057 (2022–present)

Becontree is an electoral ward in the London Borough of Barking and Dagenham. It returns councillors to Barking and Dagenham London Borough Council. The ward was created on 1 April 1994 from territory that had previously formed part of the Goodmayes ward in the London Borough of Redbridge. The ward was first used in the 1994 elections.

== List of councillors ==
Term	Councillor	Party
1994–2006	Edith Bradley	Labour
1994–2006	John Wainwright	Labour
2002–2006	Cameron Geddes	Labour
2006–2010	Alok Agrawal	Labour
2006–2022	Evelyn Carpenter	Labour
2006–2010	Emmanuel Obasohan	Labour
2010–2014	Rob Douglas	Labour
2010–2018	James Ogungbose	Labour
2014–2018	Faruk Choudhury	Labour
2018–present	Edna Fergus	Labour
2018–present	Muhammad Saleem	Labour

== Barking and Dagenham council elections since 2022 ==
There was a revision of ward boundaries in Barking and Dagenham in 2022. Becontree lost territory south of Longbridge Road to the Mayesbrook ward.

=== 2022 election ===
The election took place on 5 May 2022.

2022 Barking and Dagenham London Borough Council election: Becontree
Party	Candidate	Votes	%	±%
Labour	Edna Fergus	1,121	45.6	N/A
Labour	Muhammad Saleem	1,002	40.8	N/A
Conservative	Anthony Egbuhuzor	334	13.6	N/A
Turnout		1,489	23.2	N/A
Registered electors		6,365		
Labour win (new boundaries)				
Labour win (new boundaries)				

== 2002–2022 Barking and Dagenham council elections ==
Becontree ward boundaries from 2002 to 2022

There was a revision of ward boundaries in Barking and Dagenham in 2002.

=== 2018 election ===
The election took place on 3 May 2018.

2018 Barking and Dagenham London Borough Council election: Becontree
Party	Candidate	Votes	%	±%
Labour	Evelyn Carpenter	2,161	29.1	+3.9
Labour	Edna Fergus	2,047	27.5	N/A
Labour	Muhammad Saleem	1,854	25.0	N/A
Conservative	Richard Hall	625	8.4	N/A
Conservative	Mahammad Sajid Khalifa	378	5.1	N/A
Conservative	Syed Baqar Raza Naqvi	364	4.9	N/A
Turnout		2,750	28.3	−8.5
Registered electors		9,707		
Labour hold		Swing		
Labour hold		Swing		
Labour hold		Swing		

=== 2014 election ===
The election took place on 22 May 2014.

2014 Barking and Dagenham London Borough Council election: Becontree
Party	Candidate	Votes	%	±%
Labour	Evelyn Carpenter	2,098	25.2	N/A
Labour	Faruk Choudhury	1,885	22.7	N/A
Labour	James Ogungbose	1,784	21.5	N/A
UKIP	Robert Douglas	858	10.3	N/A
UKIP	Yvonne Douglas	826	10.0	N/A
Conservative	Lorraine Larner	294	3.5	N/A
Conservative	Mohammed Hosain	211	2.5	N/A
Conservative	Ricci Smith	208	2.5	N/A
Liberal Democrats	David De Cruz	151	1.8	N/A
Turnout		3,169	36.8	−23.4
Registered electors		8,601		
Labour hold		Swing		
Labour hold		Swing		
Labour hold		Swing		

=== 2010 election ===
The election on 6 May 2010 took place on the same day as the United Kingdom general election.

2010 Barking and Dagenham London Borough Council election: Becontree
Party	Candidate	Votes	%	±%
Labour	Evelyn Carpenter	2,444	45.3	−2.0
Labour	Rob Douglas	2,387		
Labour	James Ogungbose	2,171		
BNP	Terence Matthews	1,038	19.3	N/A
Conservative	Patrice King	759	14.1	−10.4
Conservative	Roshan Arawwawala	614		
Liberal Democrats	Chris Watson	584	10.8	N/A
Independent	Alok Agrawal	375	7.0	N/A
Independent	Corinne Angela Lowe	268		
Independent	Rick Lowe	252		
Christian	Paula Denise Watson	192	3.6	N/A
Christian	Robert Ralph	191		
Christian	Benjamin David Conway	179		
Turnout		4,538	60.2	+27.8
Registered electors		7,535		
Labour hold		Swing		
Labour hold		Swing		
Labour hold		Swing		

=== 2006 election ===
The election took place on 4 May 2006.

2006 Barking and Dagenham London Borough Council election: Becontree
Party	Candidate	Votes	%	±%
Labour	Alok Agrawal	1,268	47.3	−18.5
Labour	Evelyn Carpenter	1,240		
Labour	Emmanuel Obasohan	1,058		
UKIP	Daphne Jordon	749	28.1	N/A
Conservative	Claire Barker	653	24.5	N/A
Conservative	Malcolm Barker	607		
Turnout		2,454	32.4	+15.4
Registered electors		7,578		
Labour hold		Swing		
Labour hold		Swing		
Labour hold		Swing		

=== 2002 election ===
The election took place on 2 May 2002.

2002 Barking and Dagenham London Borough Council election: Becontree
Party	Candidate	Votes	%	±%
Labour	Edith Bradley	841	65.8	−10.0
Labour	John Wainwright	686		
Labour	Cameron Geddes	684		
Liberal Democrats	Rosemary Roberts	438	34.2	+10.0
Turnout		1,229	17.0	−2.8
Registered electors		7,212		
Labour win (new boundaries)				
Labour win (new boundaries)				
Labour win (new boundaries)				

== 1994–2002 Barking and Dagenham council elections ==
The ward was created on 1 April 1994 and consisted of territory that had been part of the Goodmayes ward in the London Borough of Redbridge. The purpose of the transfer was to unite the whole of the Becontree estate in Barking and Dagenham. From 1 April 1994 until after the first election the new ward was represented by Triptons ward councillors.

=== 1998 election ===
The election took place on 7 May 1998.

1998 Barking and Dagenham London Borough Council election: Becontree
Party	Candidate	Votes	%	±%
Labour	Edith Bradley	754	75.8	−5.4
Labour	John Wainwright	610		
Liberal Democrats	Anthony Stepton	241	24.2	+5.6
Turnout		1,027	19.8	−14.1
Registered electors		5,190		
Labour hold		Swing		
Labour hold		Swing		

=== 1994 election ===
The election took place on 5 May 1994.

1994 Barking and Dagenham London Borough Council election: Becontree
Party	Candidate	Votes	%	±%
Labour	Edith Bradley	1,354	81.2	N/A
Labour	John Wainwright	1,292		
Liberal Democrats	Clifford Evans	313	18.8	N/A
Liberal Democrats	Linda McGuinness	294		
Turnout		1,760	33.9	N/A
Registered electors		5,183		
Labour win (new seat)				
Labour win (new seat)				
