= Hornchurch Marshes =

Coordinates: 51.518°N 0.167°E

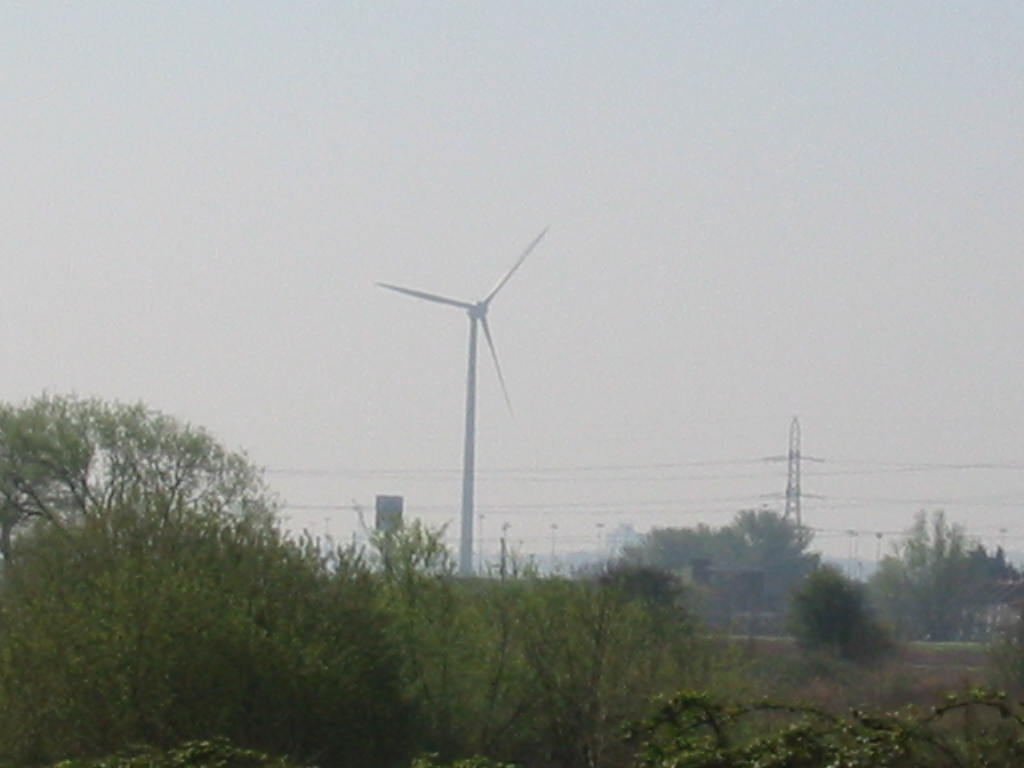
- Turbine 2

- Location within Greater London
- Population: 8,831 (Hornchurch Marshes MSOA, E02000491, 2011 Census)
- OS grid reference: TQ 504821
  - Charing Cross: 13.6 mi (21.9 km) W
- London borough: Havering
- Ceremonial county: Greater London
- Region: London
- Country: England
- Sovereign state: United Kingdom
- Post town: RAINHAM
- Postcode district: RM13
- Dialling code: 020
- Police: Metropolitan
- Fire: London
- Ambulance: London
- UK Parliament: Dagenham and Rainham
- London Assembly: Havering and Redbridge

Hornchurch Marshes is an area of the London Borough of Havering, adjacent to the north bank of the River Thames in London, England. Susceptible to flooding from three adjacent rivers, it was the southernmost marshland section of the ancient parish of Hornchurch. It was used for cattle grazing from the 16th to the 19th century and became industrialised by the 20th century. The eastern part of the Ford Dagenham estate extended into the Hornchurch Marshes and it is now an area of regeneration that includes Beam Reach and part of Beam Park. Two of the Dagenham wind turbines are located there and the Centre for Engineering and Manufacturing Excellence.

== History ==
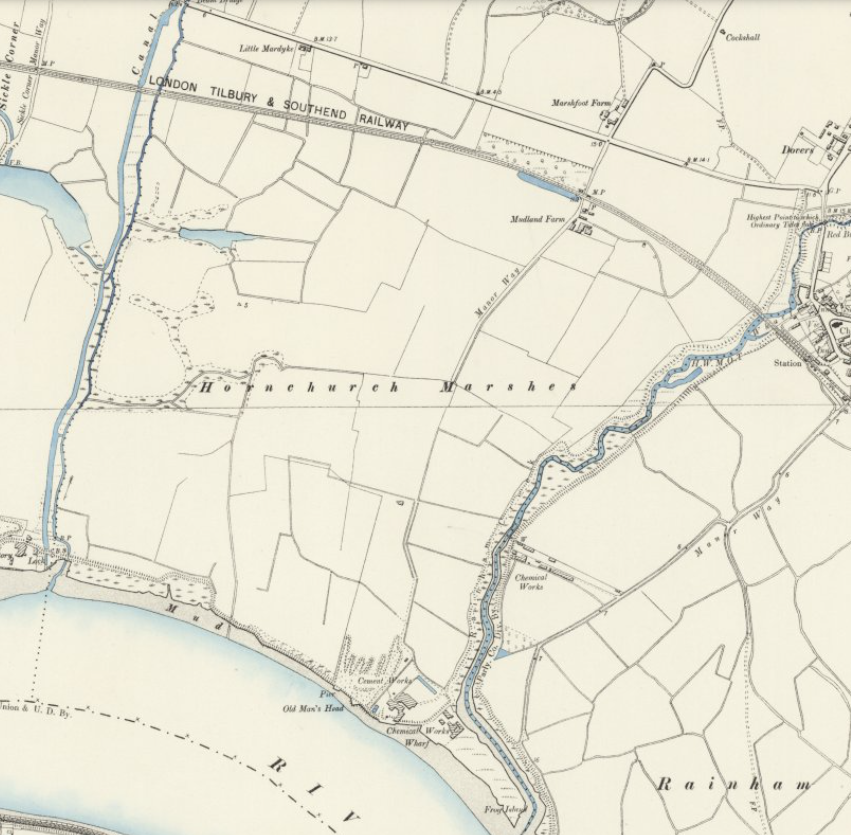
Mostly unpopulated at the turn of the 19th century

The prehistoric vegetation was alnus carr woodland, sedge and grass swamp.

The name is recorded as 'Markedich' around 1260 in Hornchurch Priory documents. Hornchurch Marshes were also known as Havering Marsh, reflecting Havering and Hornchurch occupying the same area from an early time.

By the 16th century there were 500 or 600 acres of marshland adjacent to the River Thames in the south of the parish of Hornchurch, with around 100 acres as common land and the rest privately owned. The marsh was used for cattle grazing and became popular with butchers, inn owners and others in the City of London and by the 19th century it had become famous for the quality of the cattle sent to the London meat market.

It was bounded by three rivers and required constant attention to keep it from flooding. Increasing ownership of the land by people who lived outside of Havering meant that the costs of maintenance of drainage systems and marsh walls fell to those who were locally resident. Flooding of the marsh in 1591 caused by the negligence of William Ayloffe caused a protracted dispute. Repairs following flooding in September 1621 were supervised by Dutch engineer Cornelius Vermuyden.

New Road was built towards the northern limit of the marshes in 1810 by the Tilbury Turnpike Trust, to shorten the distance troops would have to travel to the Tilbury Fort during the Napoleonic War. The London, Tilbury and Southend Railway was built through the north of the area in 1854 with a level crossing at Manor Way and the nearest station at Rainham. Waste arriving by barge from central London and dredging of the River Thames in the late 19th and early 20th centuries was disposed in the marshland and consequently the land is at risk of contamination.

Romford Rural District Council was the local authority for the area from 1894. The council built the Riverside Sewage Treatment Works in 1924 to deal with sewage from Dagenham. Ownership passed to Dagenham Urban District Council when Hornchurch and Dagenham were split off from the rural district in 1926. The works were expanded in the 1960s by Dagenham Borough Council. Hornchurch Marshes were part of Hornchurch Urban District from 1926 to 1965.

In the 1950s a foundry was built as part of the Ford Dagenham plant land in Hornchurch, covering 200 acres. The area was flooded during the North Sea flood of 1953. Land ownership consolidated as the marshes industrialised, with the Ford Motor Company and the Greater London Council, who now operated the sewage works, owning most of the land in the early 1970s. It became an area of regeneration by the early 21st century and was included in the London Riverside section of the Thames Gateway redevelopment zone. Local planning powers were held by the London Thames Gateway Development Corporation from 2004 to 2013.

== Geography ==
The area is bounded by the River Ingrebourne to the east, the River Thames to the south and River Beam to the west. In the north the A1306 New Road marks the beginning of the residential area of South Hornchurch. It is the location of two of the Dagenham wind turbines. Frog Island is located at the southeastern extremity.

Extending into Dagenham is the new residential neighbourhood of Beam Park to the northwest. South of there is the Beam Reach commercial regeneration area and the Centre for Engineering and Manufacturing Excellence (CEME). To the east is the town of Rainham and the Rainham Marshes. The Hornchurch Marshes and most of South Hornchurch form part of the Rainham post town for postal addresses. There is a Hornchurch Marshes Middle Layer Super Output Area (MSOA) for Census recording. It extends some distance north of the New Road. The population of this area at the 2011 United Kingdom census was 8,831 in 3,604 households.

The area is vulnerable to tidal flooding from the River Thames should an extreme flood event occur. Aside from the boundary rivers there are a number of smaller watercourses, including Pooles Sewer and the Havering New Sewer, that ultimately flow into the Thames at Havering Sluice. The Beam and Ingrebourne are also protected from tidal flooding by Beam Sluice and Frog Island Sluice at their outfall. Sections of Thames tidal defence walls also provide flood mitigation.

== Economy ==
The Greater London Authority has designated the whole area as a strategic industrial location, where proposals for development should not compromise accommodating industrial activities. The Fairview Industrial Estate is occupied by over 100 businesses. The area, with the exception of land owned by the Ford Motor Company, is part of the London Riverside business improvement district.
