= Mayesbrook (ward) =

- Electoral ward for the Barking and Dagenham London Borough Council
- Mayesbrook ward boundaries since 2022
- Borough: Barking and Dagenham
- County: Greater London
- Population: 15,922 (2021) (Note: 2021 Census data reported for 2022 ward boundaries)
- Electorate: 9,594 (2022)
- Major settlements: Becontree
- Area: 1.715 square kilometres (0.662 sq mi)

Current electoral ward
- Created: 2002
- Number of members: 3
- Councillors: Shamsul Azam; AKashif Haroon; Faiza Noreen
- GSS code: E05000036 (2002–2022); E05014065 (2022–present)

Mayesbrook is an electoral ward in the London Borough of Barking and Dagenham. The ward was first used in the 2002 elections. It returns three councillors to Barking and Dagenham London Borough Council. The boundaries of the ward were altered in May 2022.

== Barking and Dagenham council elections since 2022 ==
There was a revision of ward boundaries in Barking and Dagenham in 2022. Some territory was lost to Becontree and some was gained from Goresbrook and Parsloes.

=== 2026 election ===
The election took place on 7 May 2026.

2026 Barking and Dagenham London Borough Council election: Mayesbrook
Party	Candidate	Votes	%	±%
Labour	Shamsul Azam	1,182	36.0	N/A
Labour	Kashif Haroon	1,129	34.4	−28.5
Labour	Faiza Noreen	1,105	33.7	N/A
Reform	Andy McNab	1,033	31.5	N/A
Reform	Ray Anderson	1,023	31.2	N/A
Reform	Bijoy Johnson	1,023	31.2	N/A
Green	Raju Ahamad	758	23.1	N/A
Green	Juliano Nunes	719	21.9	N/A
Green	Syed Roomy	637	19.4	N/A
Conservative	Shahana Choudhury	247	7.5	N/A
Conservative	Tamanna Mirza	224	6.8	N/A
Conservative	Mizanur Rahman	195	5.9	N/A
Liberal Democrats	Waheed Nazir	128	3.9	N/A
Turnout		3,283	33.2	+12.6
Registered electors		9,889		
Labour hold		Swing		
Labour hold		Swing		
Labour hold		Swing		

=== 2023 by-election ===
The by-election took place on 14 September 2023, following the resignation of Nashitha Choudhury.

2023 Mayesbrook by-election
Party	Candidate	Votes	%	±%
Labour	Summya Sohaib	632		
Conservative	Sharfaraz Raj	444		
Green	Simon Anthony	192		
Liberal Democrats	Olumide Adeyefa	81		
Turnout			14	
Labour hold		Swing		

=== 2022 election ===
The election took place on 5 May 2022.

2022 Barking and Dagenham London Borough Council election: Mayesbrook
Party	Candidate	Votes	%	±%
Labour	Nashitha Choudhury	1,301	26.4	N/A
Labour	Kashif Haroon	1,259	25.6	N/A
Labour	Ade Oluwole	1,242	25.2	N/A
Conservative	Andy McNab	565	11.5	N/A
Conservative	Florin Lazar	559	11.4	N/A
Turnout		2,002	20.6	N/A
Registered electors		9,594		
Labour hold		Swing		
Labour hold		Swing		
Labour hold		Swing		

== 2002–2022 Barking and Dagenham council elections ==
Mayesbrook ward boundaries from 2002 to 2022

There electoral ward was created in 2002.

=== 2018 election ===
The election took place on 3 May 2018.

2018 Barking and Dagenham London Borough Council election: Mayesbrook
Party	Candidate	Votes	%	±%
Labour	Toni Bankole	1,352	26.0	N/A
Labour	Kashif Haroon	1,251	24.1	+4.71
Labour	Ade Oluwole	1,241	23.9	+5.08
Conservative	Andy McNab	541	10.4	N/A
Conservative	Munish Khanna	413	7.9	N/A
Conservative	Cynthia Wijesuriya	395	7.6	N/A
Turnout		1,931	26.9	−7.4
Registered electors		7,175		
Labour hold		Swing		
Labour hold		Swing		
Labour hold		Swing		

=== 2014 election ===
The election took place on 22 May 2014.

2014 Barking and Dagenham London Borough Council election: Mayesbrook
Party	Candidate	Votes	%	±%
Labour	Danielle Smith	1,217	21.3	N/A
Labour	Kashif Haroon	1,105	19.4	N/A
Labour	Adegboyega Oloyede	1,073	18.8	N/A
UKIP	Dorothy Hunt	1,061	18.6	N/A
Green	Antony Rablen	353	6.2	N/A
BNP	Giuseppe De Santis	280	4.9	N/A
Conservative	Sufia Begum	252	4.4	N/A
Conservative	Md. Foyzur Rahman	196	3.4	N/A
Conservative	Ahmed Shahjahan	166	2.9	N/A
Turnout		2,432	34.3	−25.2
Registered electors		7,093		
Labour hold		Swing		
Labour hold		Swing		
Labour hold		Swing		

=== 2010 election ===
The election on 6 May 2010 took place on the same day as the United Kingdom general election.

:

2010 Barking and Dagenham London Borough Council election: Mayesbrook
Party	Candidate	Votes	%	±%
Labour	Dee Hunt	1,908	39.5	+11.1
Labour	Ralph Baldwin	1,777		
Labour	George Barratt	1,705		
BNP	Tracy Anne Lansdown	1,123	23.2	−15.2
BNP	Robert John Anthony Buckley	1,109		
BNP	Mandy Matthews	1,024		
Conservative	Tom O'Brien	778	16.1	+7.7
Liberal Democrats	Funke Adesanoye	528	10.9	N/A
UKIP	Bert Bedwell	496	10.3	−14.6
Turnout		3,991	59.5	+19.1
Registered electors		6,713		
Labour gain from BNP		Swing		
Labour gain from BNP		Swing		
Labour hold		Swing		

=== 2006 election ===
The election took place on 4 May 2006.

2006 Barking and Dagenham London Borough Council election: Mayesbrook
Party	Candidate	Votes	%	±%
BNP	Robert Buckley	1,145	38.4	N/A
BNP	Christine Knight	1,070		
Labour	Dee Hunt	845	28.4	−24.0
UKIP	Vivian Patten	741	24.9	N/A
UKIP	Kerry Smith	733		
UKIP	John Bolton	697		
Labour	Dominic Twomey	695		
Labour	Ahmed Choudhury	679		
Conservative	Christopher Newton	249	8.4	N/A
Turnout		2,782	40.4	+19.6
Registered electors		6,886		
BNP gain from Labour		Swing		
BNP gain from Labour		Swing		
Labour hold		Swing		

=== 2002 election ===
The election took place on 2 May 2002.

2002 Barking and Dagenham London Borough Council election: Mayesbrook
Party	Candidate	Votes	%	±%
Labour	Jean Blake	648	52.4	N/A
Labour	Dee Hunt	619		
Labour	June Conyard	605		
Liberal Democrats	John Dias-Broughton	589	47.6	N/A
Liberal Democrats	Raymond Little	589		
Liberal Democrats	Jonathon Lopez-Real	533		
Turnout		1,383	20.8	N/A
Registered electors		6,655		
Labour win (new seat)				
Labour win (new seat)				
Labour win (new seat)				
