= Safeguarded wharf =

Wharves in London, England, with special status

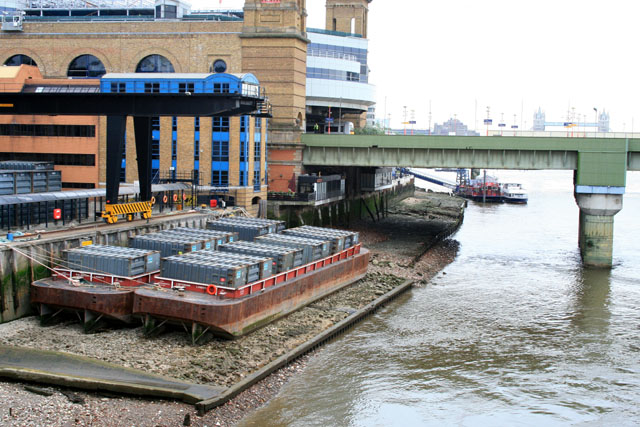
Barges at Walbrook Wharf, the only safeguarded wharf in central London

Safeguarded wharves are those wharves in London which have been given special status by the Mayor of London and the Port of London Authority (PLA) which ensures they are retained as working wharves and are protected from redevelopment into non-port use.

A 2011 report found that of the 28 wharves then designated as safeguarded, a total of 25 are still usable for or could be easily renovated for the handling of cargo shipments, but three are no longer useful and should be de-registered. The report also considered some 45 proposed new safeguarded wharves and found only 25 would be able to serve cargo.

== List of safeguarded wharves ==
=== Upper Reaches ===
- Hurlingham Wharf
- Swedish Wharf
- Comley’s Wharf (RMC Fulham)
- Western Riverside (waste transfer station)
- Pier Wharf
- Cremorne Wharf
- Cringle Dock
- Metro Greenham (RMC Battersea)
- Middle Wharf (RMC Vauxhall)

=== Central London ===
- Walbrook Wharf, City of London (waste transfer station)

=== London Docklands ===
See London Docks, Shadwell Basin, Limehouse Basin, Surrey Commercial Docks, West India Docks, Millwall Dock, East India Docks and the Royal Docks (which remains in use for boat exhibitioning) for the dock systems containing a great multitude of docks (some of which no longer exist) which were in commercial port operation until the 1970s/early 1980s.

- Convoy's Wharf
- Brewery Wharf
- Tunnel Glucose
- Victoria Deep Water Terminal
- Northumberland Wharf
- Orchard Wharf
- Priors Wharf (Lower Lea Valley/Bow Creek)
- Mayer Parry Wharf (EMR Canning Town) (Lower Lea Valley/Bow Creek)
- Thames Wharf
- Peruvian Wharf
- Manhattan Wharf
- Sunshine Wharf
- Angerstein Wharf
- Murphy’s Wharf (major existing aggregates terminal)
- Riverside Wharf
- Thames Refinery/(Tate & Lyle Jetty) (Cairn Mills; sugar)

=== Barking Creek ===
The following wharfs are located on the lower section of the River Roding, at Creekmouth.

- Welbeck Wharf
- Pinns Wharf
- Kierbeck & Steel Wharves
- Debden Wharf
- Rippleway Wharf
- Docklands Wharf
- Victoria Stone Wharf
- DePass Wharf

=== Dagenham Dock ===
- RMC Roadstone
- Pinnacle Terminal
- White Mountain Roadstone
- Hunts Wharf (Van Dalen)
- Hanson Aggregates
- Ford Dagenham Terminal

=== Erith Reach ===
- Borax Wharf/Manor Wharf
- Phoenix Wharf, Frog Island
- Halfway Wharf (Tilda Rice)
- Mulberry Wharf
- Pioneer Wharf
- Albion Wharf
- RMC Erith
- Railway Wharf (RMC)
- Mayer Parry Wharf (EMR Erith/Mayer Parry Recycling)
- Standard Wharf

== See also ==
- List of locations in the Port of London
