= Mayesbrook =

Mayesbrook could refer to:

- Mayesbrook, a tributary of the River Roding
- Mayesbrook (ward), Barking and Dagenham
- Mayesbrook Park
