= City of London Coroner's Court =

Coordinates: 51.5104°N 0.0915°W

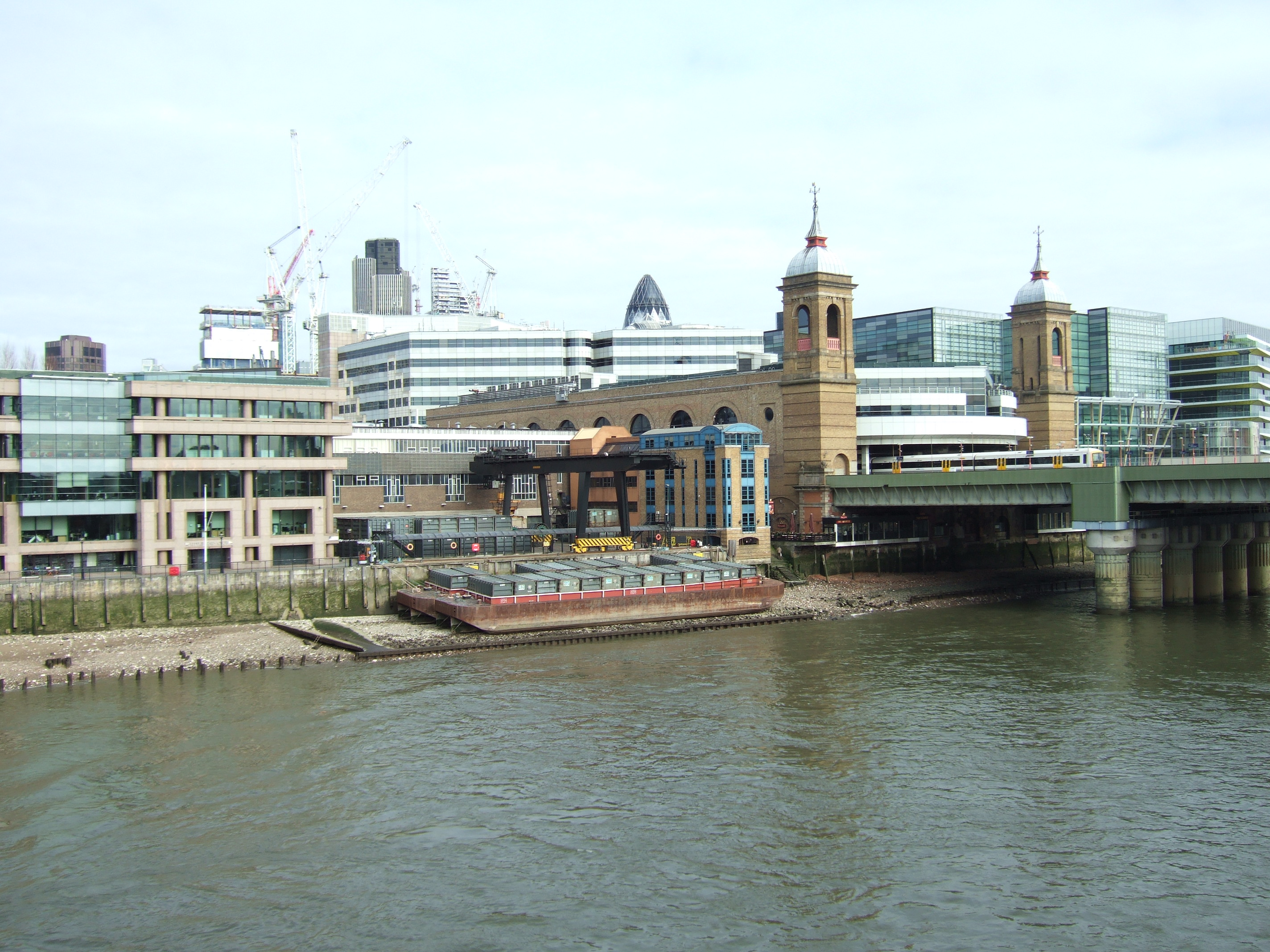
Walbrook Wharf from the River Thames.

The Coroner's Court for the City of London is located at Walbrook Wharf, 78-83 Upper Thames Street.

== History ==
The coroner was originally the King's Butler and Chamberlain.

In 1478, Edward IV granted the City of London Corporation the right to appoint the coroner. Later, in 1550, Edward VI granted the city the right to appoint the coroner for the Borough of Southwark, resulting in the City Coroner generally also being appointed as coroner for the borough as well.
