= Walbrook (disambiguation) =

Walbrook is a ward, a street and a subterranean river in the City of London.

Walbrook may also refer to:

Places

- Walbrook, Baltimore, a neighborhood in Baltimore, Maryland, USA
- Walbrook High School, a high school in Baltimore, Maryland, USA

People

- Louise Walbrook, pen name of novelist Edith Templeton (1916–2006)
- Anton Walbrook (1896–1967), Austrian actor

== See also ==
- Walbrook Rowing Club
- Walbrook Wharf
- River Walbrook
- Wallbrook (disambiguation)
- St Stephen Walbrook
- St John the Baptist upon Walbrook
