= Margaret Mullane =

British politician

Margaret Mullane MP
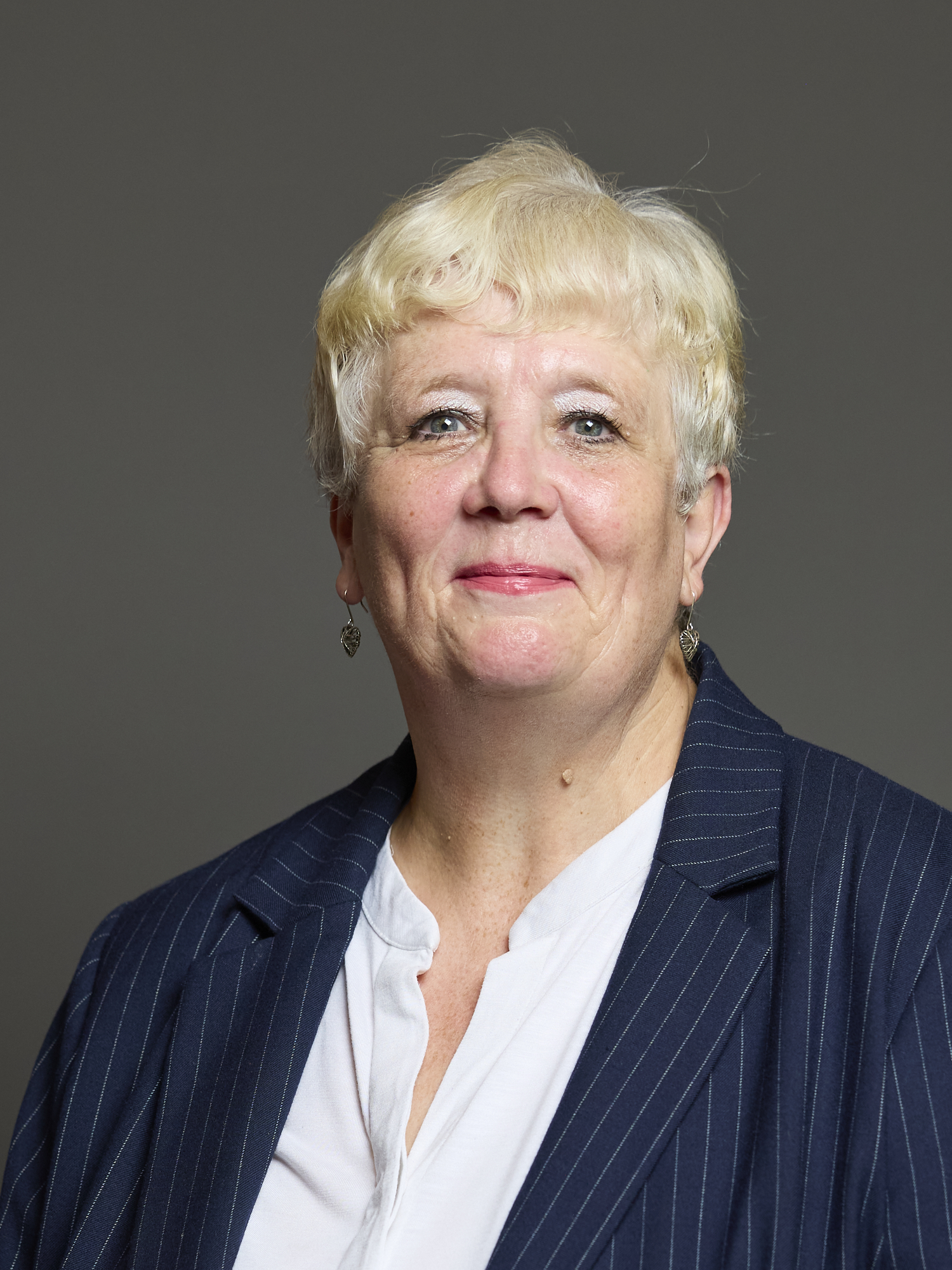
- Official portrait, 2024

Member of Parliament for Dagenham and Rainham
- Incumbent
- Assumed office 4 July 2024
- Preceded by: Jon Cruddas
- Majority: 7,173 (18.4%)

Member of Barking and Dagenham London Borough Council for Village
- In office 6 May 2010 – 28 November 2024

Personal details
- Party: Labour
- Website: margaretmullane.co.uk

Margaret Mullane is a British Labour Party politician who has served as the Member of Parliament (MP) for Dagenham and Rainham since 2024. She succeeded Jon Cruddas who decided not to run for re-election in 2022, whom she worked for as office manager. She has also served as a councillor for the Village ward in the Barking and Dagenham London Borough Council since 2010 and previously served as Cabinet Member for Enforcement and Community Safety.

== Early life ==
Margaret Mullane was raised in council houses in Dagenham, attending St Peter's School, and has described herself as working class. She studied Humanities and Politics at Birkbeck, University of London.

== Political career ==
Mullane unsuccessfully stood as a Labour Party candidate in the Mawneys ward of Havering at the 2002 local election and in the Eastbrook ward of Barking and Dagenham at the 2006 election.

She was first elected to the Barking and Dagenham London Borough Council at the 2010 election. She successfully campaigned to protect residents of Wennington from paying the Community Infrastructure Levy on rebuilding homes lost in a 2022 wildfire. In the 2024 United Kingdom general election, she won the Dagenham and Rainham constituency with a slightly reduced share of the vote. Mullane has served as a member of the Home Affairs Select Committee since October 2024.
