= Village (Barking and Dagenham ward) =

Electoral ward in London, England

- Electoral ward for the Barking and Dagenham London Borough Council
- Village ward boundaries since 2022
- Borough: Barking and Dagenham
- County: Greater London
- Population: 12,540 (2021) (Note: 2021 Census data reported for 2022 ward boundaries)
- Area: 2.191 square kilometres (0.846 sq mi)

Current electoral ward
- Created: 1965
- Number of members: 1965–1978: 4; 1978–present: 3
- Councillors: Phil Waker; Julia Williams; Ajanta Deb Roy
- GSS code: E05000041 (2002–2022); E05014070 (2022–present)

Village is an electoral ward in the London Borough of Barking and Dagenham. The ward has existed since the creation of the borough on 1 April 1965 and was first used in the 1964 elections. It returns councillors to Barking and Dagenham London Borough Council.

== List of councillors ==
Term	Councillor	Party
1964–1968	Charles Prendergast	Labour
1964–1978	Vic Rusha	Labour
1964–1968	L Todd	Labour
1964–1968	R Foster	Labour
1968–1971; 1974–1982	Matthew Spencer	Labour
1968–1974	R Coster	Labour
1968–1986	Harry Tindell	Labour
1971–1978	L Bryant	Labour
1978–1990	Peter Bradley	Labour
1982–1990	Ronald Whitbread	Labour
1986–1990	Alfred Rusha	Labour
1990–2004	Darrin Best	Labour
1990–2002	Katherine Golden	Labour
1990–2006	Bill Dale	Labour
2002–2024	Lee Waker	Labour
2004–present	Phil Waker	Labour
2006–2010	Jamie Jarvis	BNP
2010–2024	Margaret Mullane	Labour
2024–present	Julia Williams	Labour
2024–present	Ajanta Deb Roy	Labour

== Barking and Dagenham council elections since 2022 ==
There was a revision of ward boundaries in Barking and Dagenham in 2022.

=== 2026 election ===
The election took place on 7 May 2026.

2026 Barking and Dagenham London Borough Council election: Village
Party	Candidate	Votes	%	±%
Labour	Ajanta Deb Roy	1,542	49.0	N/A
Labour	Phil Waker	1,495	47.5	−26.7
Labour	Julia Williams	1,493	47.5	N/A
Reform	Del Hunter	1,007	32.0	N/A
Reform	Michael Smith	1,007	32.0	N/A
Reform	Marina Sanduleac	960	30.5	N/A
Conservative	Sheikh Ahmed	407	12.9	N/A
Conservative	Graham Gosling	334	10.6	N/A
Conservative	Arinola Araba	320	10.2	N/A
Liberal Democrats	Olumide Adeyefa	309	9.8	N/A
Turnout		3,144	36.8	+10.6
Registered electors		8,539		
Labour hold		Swing		
Labour hold		Swing		
Labour hold		Swing		

=== 2024 by-election ===
The by-election took place on 28 November 2024, following the death of Lee Waker and resignation of Margaret Mullane.

2024 Village by-election
Party	Candidate	Votes	%	±%
Labour	Julia Williams	776	49.1	− 27.0
Labour	Ajanta Deb-Roy	774	49.0	
Conservative	Ben Suter	580	36.7	+ 15.5
Conservative	Graham Gosling	571	36.1	
Green	Kim Arrowsmith	103	6.5	+ 6.5
Green	Tope Olawoyin	97	6.1	
Liberal Democrats	George Elebiju	70	4.4	+ 4.4
Liberal Democrats	Herbert Munangatire	37	2.3	
Turnout		1,579	19.03	− 7.17
Labour hold		Swing		
Labour hold		Swing		

=== 2022 election ===
The election took place on 5 May 2022.

2022 Barking and Dagenham London Borough Council election: Village
Party	Candidate	Votes	%	±%
Labour	Margaret Mullane	1,690	28.6	N/A
Labour	Lee Waker	1,675	28.3	N/A
Labour	Phil Waker	1,647	27.9	N/A
Conservative	James Beris	471	8.0	N/A
Conservative	Vincent Williams	431	7.3	N/A
Turnout		2,219	26.2	N/A
Registered electors		8,429		
Labour win (new boundaries)				
Labour win (new boundaries)				
Labour win (new boundaries)				

== 2002–2022 Barking and Dagenham council elections ==
Village ward boundaries from 2002 to 2022

There was a revision of ward boundaries in Barking and Dagenham in 2002.

=== 2018 election ===
The election took place on 3 May 2018.

2018 Barking and Dagenham London Borough Council election: Village
Party	Candidate	Votes	%	±%
Labour	Margaret Mullane	1,829	27.70	−3.8
Labour	Lee Waker	1,767	26.8	−7.1
Labour	Phil Waker	1,687	25.55	−6.0
Conservative	Vivian Patten	462	7.0	N/A
Conservative	Neil Connelly	439	6.6	N/A
Conservative	Lorraine Harris	420	6.4	N/A
Turnout		2,375	31.2	−8.7
Registered electors		7,606		
Labour hold		Swing		
Labour hold		Swing		
Labour hold		Swing		

=== 2014 election ===
The election took place on 22 May 2014.

2014 Barking and Dagenham London Borough Council election: Village
Party	Candidate	Votes	%	±%
Labour	Lee Waker	2,031	33.8	N/A
Labour	Phil Waker	1,892	31.5	N/A
Labour	Margaret Mullane	1,889	31.5	N/A
Liberal Democrats	Christine Watson	190	3.2	N/A
Turnout		2,956	39.9	−19.1
Registered electors		7,409		
Labour hold		Swing		
Labour hold		Swing		
Labour hold		Swing		

=== 2010 election ===
The election on 6 May 2010 took place on the same day as the United Kingdom general election.

2010 Barking and Dagenham London Borough Council election: Village
Party	Candidate	Votes	%	±%
Labour	Lee Waker	2,454	49.4	+12.2
Labour	Phil Waker	2,303		
Labour	Margaret Mullane	2,259		
BNP	Len Bird	1,049	21.1	−14.7
Conservative	Malcolm Beatty	906	18.3	+7.5
Conservative	Roy Alan Zelkin	654		
Conservative	Sammy Omosule	587		
Liberal Democrats	Robert Graham Hills	555	11.2	+2.8
Turnout		4,239	59.0	+16.8
Registered electors		7,185		
Labour hold		Swing		
Labour hold		Swing		
Labour gain from BNP		Swing		

=== 2006 election ===
The election took place on 4 May 2006.

2006 Barking and Dagenham London Borough Council election: Village
Party	Candidate	Votes	%	±%
Labour	Phil Waker	1,276	37.2	−18.0
Labour	Lee Waker	1,269		
BNP	Jamie Jarvis	1,227	35.8	N/A
Labour	Bill Dale	1,209		
BNP	James Webb	1,208		
Conservative	Kenneth Coombs	370	10.8	−12.5
Liberal Democrats	Fredrick Tindling	287	8.4	−13.1
UKIP	Leslie Parsons	272	7.9	N/A
Turnout		2,990	42.2	+19.8
Registered electors		7,089		
Labour hold		Swing		
Labour hold		Swing		
BNP gain from Labour		Swing		

=== 2004 by-election ===
The by-election took place on 7 October 2004, following the resignation of Darrin Best.

2004 Village by-election
Party	Candidate	Votes	%	±%
Labour	Phil Waker	1,085	44.7	−10.5
BNP	Lawrence Rustem	934	38.5	N/A
Conservative	Kerry Smith	410	16.9	−6.4
Majority		151	6.2	N/A
Turnout			35.0	+12.6
Registered electors				
Labour hold		Swing		

=== 2002 election ===
The election took place on 2 May 2002.

2002 Barking and Dagenham London Borough Council election: Village
Party	Candidate	Votes	%	±%
Labour	Lee Waker	981	55.2	−14.9
Labour	Darrin Best	946		
Labour	Bill Dale	890		
Conservative	Neil Connelly	414	23.3	+6.2
Liberal Democrats	Frederick Tindling	383	21.5	+8.7
Turnout		1,552	22.4	−1.1
Registered electors		6,941		
Labour win (new boundaries)				
Labour win (new boundaries)				
Labour win (new boundaries)				

== 1978–2002 Barking and Dagenham council elections ==
There was a revision of ward boundaries in Barking in 1978. Councillors representing Village decreased from four to three. The name of the borough and council changed from Barking to Barking and Dagenham on 1 January 1980.

=== 1998 election ===
The election took place on 7 May 1998.

1998 Barking and Dagenham London Borough Council election: Village
Party	Candidate	Votes	%	±%
Labour	Katherine Golden	1,146	70.1	−8.8
Labour	Darrin Best	1,112		
Labour	Bill Dale	1,041		
Conservative	Kenneth Coombs	280	17.1	+7.1
Conservative	Susan Hallewell	262		
Liberal Democrats	Anthony Pickford	209	12.8	+1.7
Liberal Democrats	Trevor Johnson	184		
Turnout		1,681	23.5	−13.4
Registered electors		7,166		
Labour hold		Swing		
Labour hold		Swing		
Labour hold		Swing		

=== 1994 election ===
The election took place on 5 May 1994.

1994 Barking and Dagenham London Borough Council election: Village
Party	Candidate	Votes	%	±%
Labour	Katherine Golden	1,968	78.9	+4.7
Labour	Darrin Best	1,872		
Labour	Bill Dale	1,849		
Liberal Democrats	Peter Lepley	276	11.1	+2.6
Liberal Democrats	Linda Holmes	264		
Conservative	Kenneth Coombs	250	10.0	−7.3
Liberal Democrats	Samuel Hodge	248		
Conservative	Terence Mallindine	205		
Conservative	William Preston	195		
Turnout		2,630	36.9	+1.3
Registered electors		7,134		
Labour hold		Swing		
Labour hold		Swing		
Labour hold		Swing		

=== 1990 election ===
The election took place on 3 May 1990.

1990 Barking and Dagenham London Borough Council election: Village
Party	Candidate	Votes	%	±%
Labour	Darrin Best	1,956	75.36	
Labour	Katherine Golden	1,920		
Labour	Bill Dale	1,914		
Conservative	Kenneth Coombs	457	15.89	
Conservative	Terence Mallindine	396		
Conservative	Royston Oliver	367		
Liberal Democrats	Carole Sparrow	224	8.75	
Registered electors		7,448		
Turnout		2,652	35.61	
Rejected ballots		5	0.2	N/A
Labour hold		Swing		
Labour hold		Swing		
Labour hold		Swing		

=== 1986 election ===
The election took place on 8 May 1986.

1986 Barking and Dagenham London Borough Council election: Village
Party	Candidate	Votes	%	±%
Labour	Peter Bradley	1,498	72.7	+30.5
Labour	Alfred Rusha	1,414		
Labour	Ronald Whitbread	1,371		
Conservative	Leonard Johnson	563	27.3	−3.7
Conservative	Michael Ross	522		
Conservative	Terence Mallindine	500		
Turnout			30.8	−0.4
Registered electors		7,649		
Labour hold		Swing		
Labour hold		Swing		
Labour hold		Swing		

=== 1982 election ===
The election took place on 6 May 1982.

1982 Barking and Dagenham London Borough Council election: Village
Party	Candidate	Votes	%	±%
Labour	Peter Bradley	946	42.2	−6.1
Labour	Harry Tindell	918		
Labour	Ronald Whitbread	891		
Conservative	Terence Mallindine	695	31.0	−1.8
Conservative	Vera Ellis	667		
Conservative	James Harding	657		
Independent	George Monk	540	24.1	N/A
Independent	Michael Timothy	523		
Independent	Stanley Simmons	521		
Communist	Daniel Connor	59	2.6	−1.2
Turnout			31.2	−0.8
Registered electors		7,815		
Labour hold		Swing		
Labour hold		Swing		
Labour hold		Swing		

=== 1978 election ===
The election took place on 4 May 1978.

1978 Barking London Borough Council election: Village
Party	Candidate	Votes	%	±%
Labour	Matthew Spencer	1,256	48.3	−16.1
Labour	Harry Tindell	1,161		N/A
Labour	Peter Bradley	1,156		N/A
Conservative	Terence Mallindine	851	32.8	+22.8
Conservative	John Kinnie	839		N/A
Liberal	George Poole	392	15.1	−1.3
Communist	Paul Greenaway	99	3.8	−0.6
Turnout			32.0	+10.4
Registered electors		7,614		
Labour win (new boundaries)				
Labour win (new boundaries)				
Labour win (new boundaries)				

== 1964–1978 Barking council elections ==
=== 1974 election ===
The election took place on 2 May 1974.

1974 Barking London Borough Council election: Village
Party	Candidate	Votes	%	±%
Labour	Vic Rusha	1,652	64.4	−16.7
Labour	L Bryant	1,610		N/A
Labour	Matthew Spencer	1,595		N/A
Labour	Harry Tindell	1,544		N/A
Liberal	G Poole	421	16.4	N/A
Liberal	P Northover	318		N/A
Liberal	G Andrews	301		N/A
Conservative	W Russell	257	10.0	−3.0
Conservative	W Whiter	235		N/A
Conservative	A Wilkens	213		N/A
Free Socialist	W Metcalfe	122	4.8	N/A
Communist	T Keyworth	114	4.4	−1.5
Turnout			21.6	−3.8
Registered electors		9,694		
Labour hold		Swing		
Labour hold		Swing		
Labour hold		Swing		
Labour hold		Swing		

=== 1971 election ===
The election took place on 13 May 1971.

1971 Barking London Borough Council election: Village
Party	Candidate	Votes	%	±%
Labour	Vic Rusha	2,125	81.1	+45.2
Labour	L Bryant	2,066		N/A
Labour	R Coster	2,047		N/A
Labour	Harry Tindell	2,022		N/A
Conservative	W Attridge	341	13.0	−10.1
Conservative	J Calver	337		N/A
Conservative	A Wilkens	325		N/A
Conservative	R Johnson	312		N/A
Communist	R Shannon	154	5.9	−1.5
Turnout			25.4	−1.3
Registered electors		9,572		
Labour hold		Swing		
Labour hold		Swing		
Labour hold		Swing		
Labour hold		Swing		

=== 1968 election ===
The election took place on 9 May 1968.

1968 Barking London Borough Council election: Village
Party	Candidate	Votes	%	±%
Labour	Vic Rusha	1,048	35.9	−33.5
Labour	Matthew Spencer	992		N/A
Labour	R Coster	961		N/A
Labour	Harry Tindell	948		N/A
Independent	A Fry	681	23.3	N/A
Conservative	T Edwards	675	23.1	+7.7
Conservative	J Calver	640		N/A
Conservative	J Symes	597		N/A
Conservative	C Wilkens	555		N/A
Liberal	G Poole	389	13.3	+0.6
Liberal	T Moody	268		N/A
Liberal	R Burlinson	212		N/A
Liberal	F Shaw	186		N/A
Communist	R Shannon	129	4.4	+1.9
Turnout			26.7	−4.2
Registered electors		9,012		
Labour hold		Swing		
Labour hold		Swing		
Labour hold		Swing		
Labour hold		Swing		

=== 1964 election ===
The election took place on 7 May 1964.

1964 Barking London Borough Council election: Village
Party	Candidate	Votes	%	±%
Labour	Charles Prendergast	1,980	69.4	N/A
Labour	Vic Rusha	1,929		N/A
Labour	L Todd	1,874		N/A
Labour	R Foster	1,772		N/A
Conservative	W Russell	439	15.4	N/A
Conservative	P Steele	390		N/A
Conservative	A Sabourin	386		N/A
Conservative	T Edwards	381		N/A
Liberal	G Poole	362	12.7	N/A
Liberal	T Moody	290		N/A
Liberal	R Burlinson	264		N/A
Liberal	G Bisney	254		N/A
Communist	Helena Ott	71	2.5	N/A
Turnout		2,761	30.9	N/A
Registered electors		8,933		
Labour win (new seat)				
Labour win (new seat)				
Labour win (new seat)				
Labour win (new seat)				
