= Wallbrook =

Wallbrook may refer to:

- Wallbrook, Dudley, an area of Coseley, West Midlands, England
- Wallbrook, a fictitious mental institution in the 1988 American drama film Rain Man

== See also ==
- Walbrook (disambiguation)
