= Triptons (ward) =

Former electoral ward in the London Borough of Barking and Dagenham

Coordinates: 51.563°N 0.135°E

- Former electoral ward for the Barking and Dagenham London Borough Council
- Triptons ward boundaries from 1978 to 1994
- Borough: Barking and Dagenham
- County: Greater London
- Electorate: 6,414 (1998)
- Major settlements: Dagenham

Former electoral ward
- Created: 1978
- Abolished: 2002
- Councillors: 3
- ONS code: 02AQFS
- Name origin: Triptons farm

Triptons was an electoral ward in the London Borough of Barking and Dagenham from 1978 to 2002. It returned three councillors to Barking and Dagenham London Borough Council. The ward was subject to a minor boundary revision in 1994.

== List of councillors ==
Term	Councillor	Party
1978–1998	George Brooker	Labour
1978–2002	John Davis	Labour
1978–1980	William Bellamy	Labour
1980–1982	Alan Stevens	Labour
1982–1986	Leonard Collins	Labour
1986–2002	Cameron Geddes	Labour
1998–2002	Margaret West	Labour

== Barking and Dagenham council elections ==
The name of the borough and council changed from Barking to Barking and Dagenham on 1 January 1980. Part of the ward northwest of Burnside Road was transferred to Goodmayes in the London Borough of Redbridge on 1 April 1994.

=== 1998 election ===
The election on 7 May 1998 took place on the same day as the 1998 Greater London Authority referendum.

1998 Barking and Dagenham London Borough Council election: Triptons
Party	Candidate	Votes	%	±%
Labour	John Davis	1,167	79.7	−3.6
Labour	Margaret West	1,011		
Labour	Cameron Geddes	920		
Liberal Democrats	June Griffin	297	20.3	+3.6
Liberal Democrats	Paul South	275		
Turnout		1,521	23.7	+12.1
Registered electors		6,414		
Labour hold		Swing		
Labour hold		Swing		
Labour hold		Swing		

=== 1994 election ===
The election took place on 5 May 1994.

1994 Barking and Dagenham London Borough Council election: Triptons
Party	Candidate	Votes	%	±%
Labour	George Brooker	1,804	83.49	▲8.07
Labour	John Davis	1,749		
Labour	Cameron Geddes	1,560		
Liberal Democrats	Kenneth Barker	362	16.51	▲4.95
Liberal Democrats	June Griffin	327		
Liberal Democrats	Anthony Walker	322		
Registered electors		6,628		▼365
Turnout		2,371	35.77	▼2.88
Rejected ballots		21	0.89	▲0.89
Labour hold		Swing		
Labour hold		Swing		
Labour hold		Swing		

=== 1990 election ===
The election took place on 3 May 1990. From 1 April 1994 until after the 5 May 1994 election, the new ward of Becontree was represented by the Triptons ward councillors.

1990 Barking and Dagenham London Borough Council election: Triptons
Party	Candidate	Votes	%	±%
Labour	George Brooker	2,052	71.56	
Labour	John Davis	1,885		
Labour	Cameron Geddes	1,672		
Conservative	Leonard Dutton	441	16.88	
Liberal Democrats	David Evans	302	11.56	
Registered electors		6,993		
Turnout		2,703	38.65	
Rejected ballots		0	0.00	
Labour hold		Swing		
Labour hold		Swing		
Labour hold		Swing		

=== 1986 election ===
The election took place on 8 May 1986.

1986 Barking and Dagenham London Borough Council election: Triptons
Party	Candidate	Votes	%	±%
Labour	George Brooker	1,421	71.1	+8.6
Labour	John Davis	1,417		
Labour	Cameron Geddes	1,144		
Alliance	Mark Kingswood	577	28.9	−5.0
Turnout			30.6	+4.6
Registered electors		7,046		
Labour hold		Swing		
Labour hold		Swing		
Labour hold		Swing		

=== 1982 election ===
The election took place on 6 May 1982.

1982 Barking and Dagenham London Borough Council election: Triptons
Party	Candidate	Votes	%	±%
Labour	George Brooker	1,032	62.5	−3.4
Labour	John Davis	963		
Labour	Leonard Collins	921		
Alliance	John Bell	559	33.9	N/A
Alliance	Sylvia Hayward	498		
Alliance	Paul Hitchings	486		
Communist	Jean Burke	60	3.6	−2.0
Turnout			26.0	−1.5
Registered electors		7,184		
Labour hold		Swing		
Labour hold		Swing		
Labour hold		Swing		

=== 1980 by-election ===
The by-election took place on 4 December 1980, following the death of William Bellamy.

1980 Triptons by-election
Party	Candidate	Votes	%	±%
Labour	Alan Stevens	859	68.3	+2.4
Liberal	Edward Bullock	234	18.6	N/A
Conservative	Sylvia Jones	120	9.5	−19.0
National Front	Ronald Ferrett	44	3.5	N/A
Majority		625	49.7	N/A
Turnout			17.4	−10.1
Registered electors		7,244		
Labour hold		Swing		

=== 1978 election ===
The election took place on 4 May 1978.

1978 Barking London Borough Council election: Triptons
Party	Candidate	Votes	%	±%
Labour	George Brooker	1,185	65.9	N/A
Labour	John Davis	1,152		N/A
Labour	William Bellamy	1,077		N/A
Conservative	Alan Sears	513	28.5	N/A
Conservative	George Winch	391		N/A
Communist	Danny Marshall	100	5.6	N/A
Turnout			27.5	N/A
Registered electors		7,213		
Labour win (new seat)				
Labour win (new seat)				
Labour win (new seat)				
