= Dagenham wind turbines =

Wind turbines in East London, England

Dagenham Wind Farm
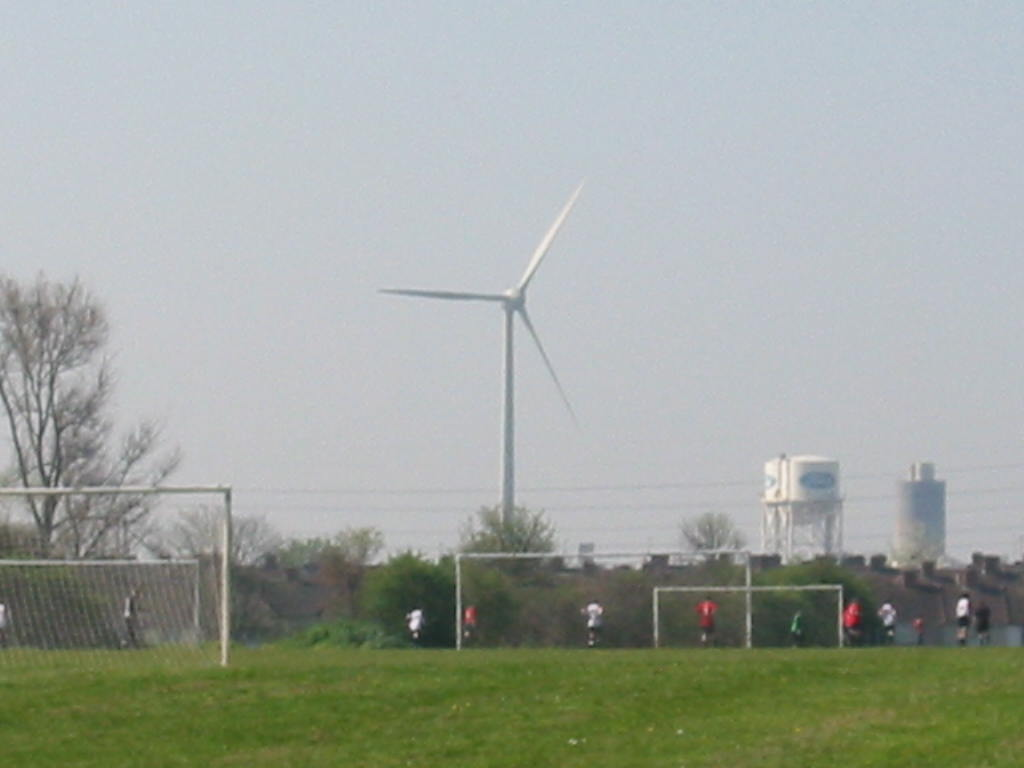
- Country: England
- Location: Dagenham, London
- Coordinates: 51°31′19″N 0°9′4″E
- Commission date: 2004
- Owner: Ford Motor Company

Power generation
- Units operational: 3 Enercon turbines
- Nameplate capacity: 5.9 MW

The Dagenham wind turbines are three 85-metre (279 ft) high Enercon E-66 and one E-82 wind turbines located on the Dagenham estate of the Ford Motor Company in East London, England. The first two turbines were completed in April 2004 and the third was installed in 2011. They are landmarks of the skyline and the first wind farm to be built in London.

== Planning and building ==
One turbine is located in the London Borough of Barking and Dagenham (Turbine 1), the second in the Hornchurch Marshes area of the London Borough of Havering (Turbine 2). Planning consent was received from both boroughs. The Mayor of London gave approval for the project in August 2003.

The turbines were constructed by the green energy company Ecotricity. Planning consent was also given for a third 65-metre (213 ft) high turbine (Turbine 3) in Havering, with a viewing platform which was not constructed. The planned operating date for the third wind turbine was by the first quarter of 2009, and it was eventually installed in 2011.

== Specifications ==
The turbines are located 10 miles (16 km) east of the City of London at OS grid reference TQ492824 and TQ502818. They are 85 metres (279 ft) high to the hub, have a rotor diameter of 70 metres (230 ft) and a combined capacity of 5.9 MW. The total height to the top of the rotors is 120 metres (390 ft).

== Location ==
Point	Coordinates (links to map & photo sources)	Notes
Turbine 1	51.5220°N 0.1510°E	1.8 MW
Turbine 2	51.5160°N 0.1648°E	1.8 MW
Turbine 3	51.5125°N 0.1656°E	2.3 MW

== Gallery ==
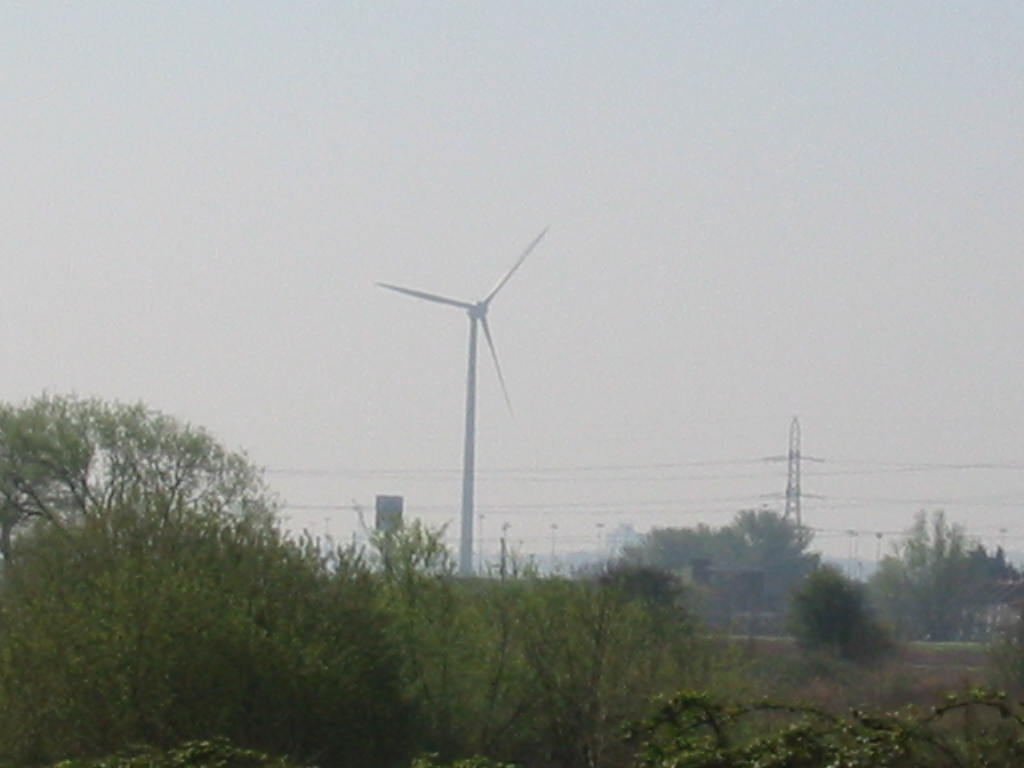
Turbine 2

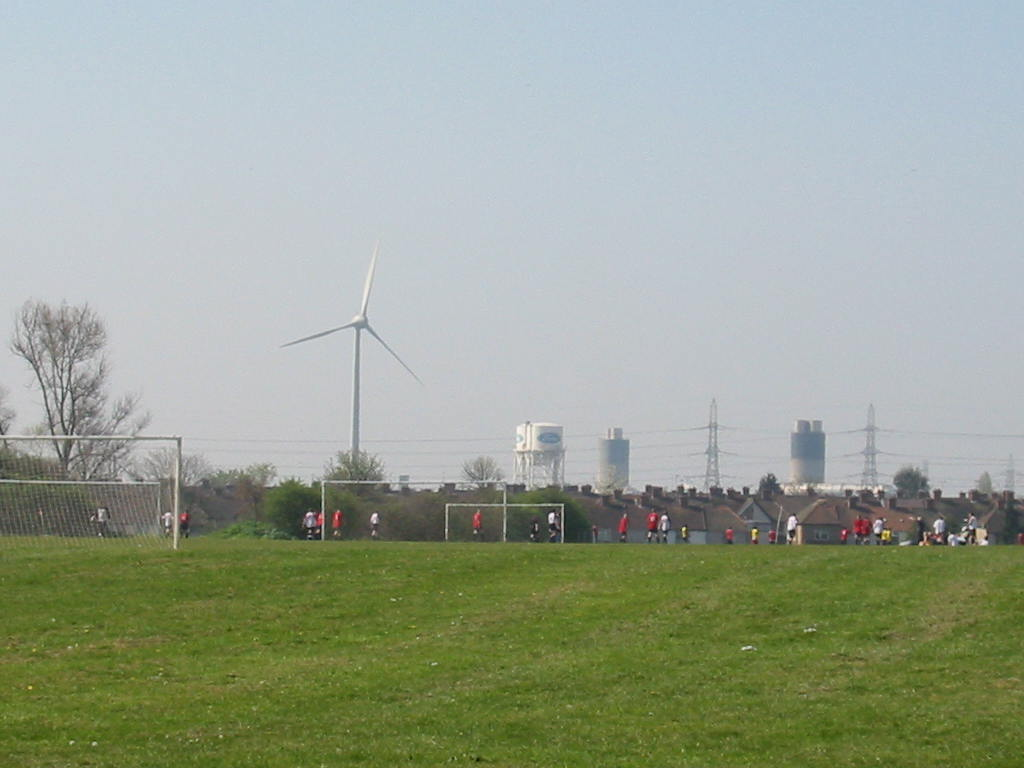
Turbine 1 and several structures of the Ford plant

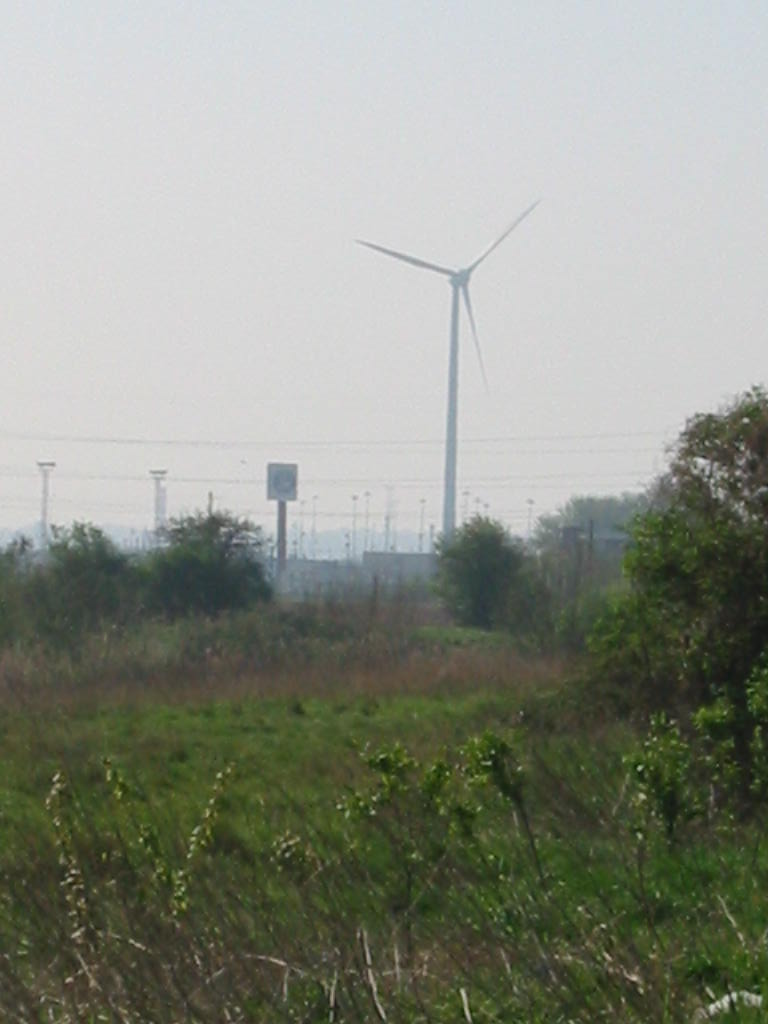
Beam valley and turbine 2

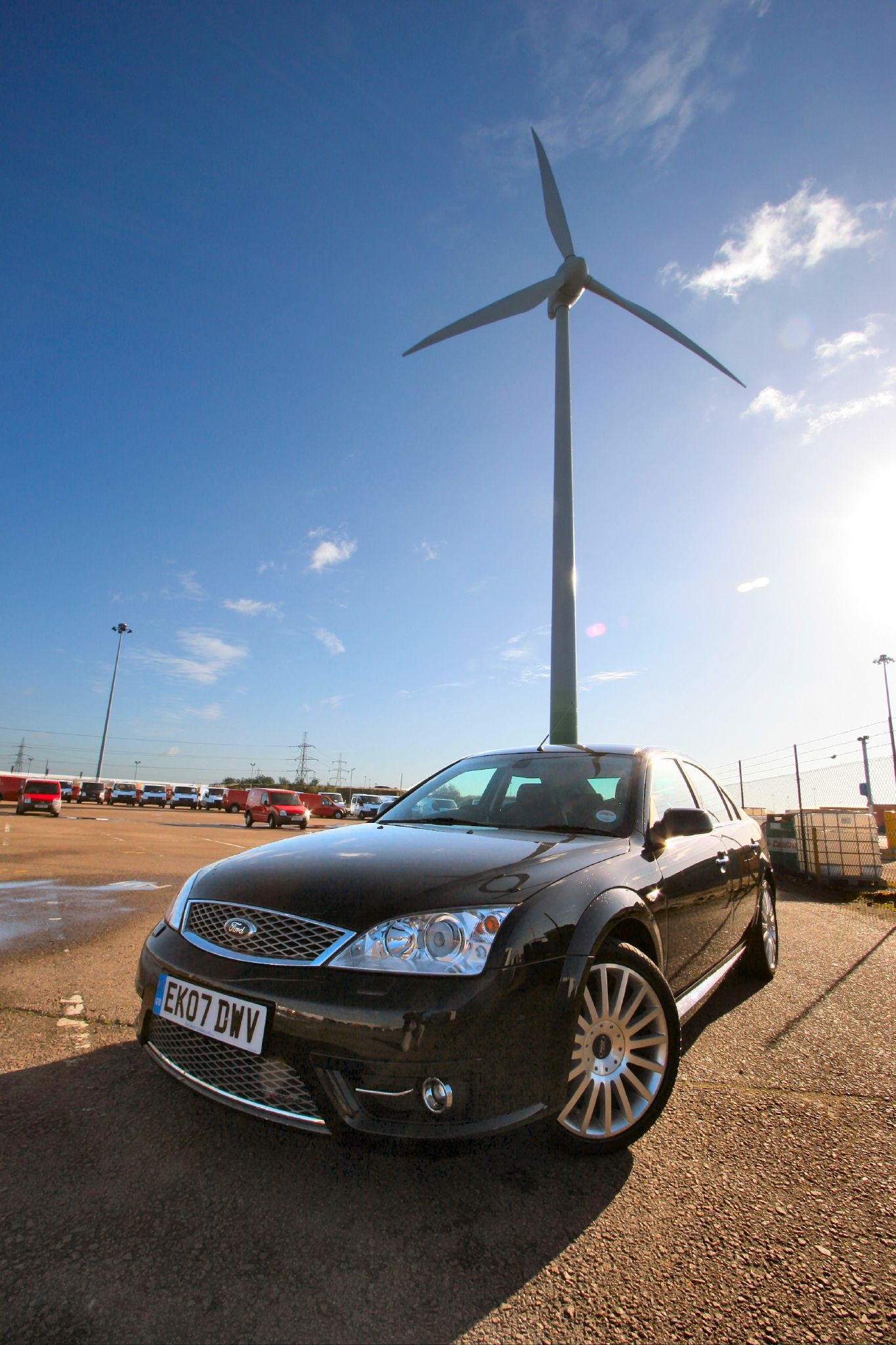
A Ford Mondeo before one of the turbines
