= Frog Island, London =

Peninsula on the River Thames in London

Coordinates: 51.5066322°N 0.1773248°E

Frog Island
- Interactive map of Frog Island

Frog Island is a peninsula on the north bank of the River Thames in Rainham, London. It is the location of the mechanical biological treatment works building of the East London Waste Authority.

== History ==
Frog Island formed the southeastern tip of the Hornchurch Marshes. The peninsula was owned by the Phoenix Timber company who operated a timber yard. In 1980, Rainham Creek was damned in works associated with the Thames Barrier. The course of the River Ingrebourne was diverted and culverted. This created a section of drained creek that was susceptible to pooling of stagnant water. Infilling of the creek took place up to 1988 and a road connection to Rainham was made over the infilling.

== Geography ==
Frog Island is located to the west of the drained and partially infilled Rainham Creek. The River Ingrebourne discharges into the River Thames through a culvert and tidal sluice. There is a radar station located at the mouth of Rainham Creek, used to monitor shipping for the Thames Barrier.

== Economy ==
The mechanical biological treatment of the East London Waste Authority, sited here, turns 50% of processed waste into refuse-derived fuel, and recovers metals and glass.

Part of Frog Island, also known as Phoenix Wharf, has safeguarded wharf status. The whole of Frog Island is included in the London Riverside Business Improvement District area.

== See also ==
- Islands in the River Thames#List of former islands
