= Beam (Barking and Dagenham ward) =

Electoral ward in Barking and Dangenham

- Electoral ward for the Barking and Dagenham London Borough Council
- Beam ward boundaries since 2022
- Borough: Barking and Dagenham
- County: Greater London
- Population: 8,610 (2021) (Note: 2021 Census data reported for 2022 ward boundaries)
- Electorate: 5,277 (2022)
- Major settlements: Beam Park
- Area: 2.825 square kilometres (1.091 sq mi)

Current electoral ward
- Created: 2022
- Number of members: 3
- Councillors: Donna Lumsden; Muhibul Chowdhury; Glen Spoor
- Created from: River
- GSS code: E05014056

Beam is an electoral ward in the London Borough of Barking and Dagenham. The ward was first used in the 2022 elections. It returns three councillors to Barking and Dagenham London Borough Council.

The ward includes the new neighbourhood of Dagenham Green and the western part of Beam Park.

Prior to 2022 the area was part of River ward.

== List of councillors ==
Term	Councillor	Party
2022–present	Donna Lumsden	Labour
2022–present	Muhibul Chowdhury	Labour
2022–2026	Muazzam Sandhu	Labour
2026–present	Glen Spoor	Labour

== Barking and Dagenham council elections ==
=== 2026 election ===
The election took place on 7 May 2026.

2026 Barking and Dagenham London Borough Council election: Beam (3)
Party	Candidate	Votes	%	±%
Labour	Muhib Chowdhury	826	47.01	−14.4
Labour	Donna Lumsden	771	43.88	−21.1
Labour	Glen Spoor	690	39.27	N/A
Reform	Anish Samuel	429	24.42	N/A
Reform	Nina Sontea	413	23.51	N/A
Green	Ionel Popa	400	22.77	N/A
Reform	Mariana Suciu	400	22.27	N/A
Liberal Democrats	George Elebiju	226	12.86	N/A
Conservative	Mehreen Iqbal	189	10.76	N/A
Conservative	Taye Ishola	186	10.59	N/A
Conservative	Joseph Omorere	161	9.16	N/A
Turnout		1,757	29.67	+3.3
Registered electors		5,922		
Labour hold		Swing		
Labour hold		Swing		
Labour hold		Swing		

=== 2022 election ===
The election took place on 5 May 2022.

2022 Barking and Dagenham London Borough Council election: Beam (3)
Party	Candidate	Votes	%	±%
Labour	Donna Lumsden	904	23.4	N/A
Labour	Muhibul Chowdhury	854	22.1	N/A
Labour	Muazzam Sandhu	825	21.4	N/A
Conservative	Karen Whittaker	433	11.2	N/A
Conservative	Mark Smith	426	11.0	N/A
Conservative	Manvindra Jaiya	417	10.8	N/A
Turnout		1,391	26.2	N/A
Registered electors		5,277		
Labour win (new seat)				
Labour win (new seat)				
Labour win (new seat)				
