= Parsloes =

Electoral ward in London, England

Coordinates: 51.545°N 0.1396°E

- Electoral ward for the Barking and Dagenham London Borough Council
- Parsloes ward boundaries since 2022
- Borough: Barking and Dagenham
- County: Greater London
- Population: 15,251 (2021) (Note: 2021 Census data reported for 2022 ward boundaries)
- Electorate: 9,936 (2022)
- Area: 2.188 square kilometres (0.845 sq mi)

Current electoral ward
- Created: 1978
- Councillors: Billy Edmunds; Alexandra Arnautu; Ripon Sheikh
- GSS code: E05000037 (2002–2022); E05014067 (2022–present)

Parsloes is an electoral ward in the London Borough of Barking and Dagenham.

== Barking and Dagenham council elections since 2022 ==
There was a revision of ward boundaries in Barking and Dagenham in 2022.

=== 2026 election ===
The election took place on 7 May 2026.

2026 Barking and Dagenham London Borough Council election: Parsloes
Party	Candidate	Votes	%	±%
Reform	Billy Edmunds	1,308	35.5	N/A
Reform	Alexandra Arnautu	1,286	34.9	N/A
Reform	Ripon Sheikh	1,149	31.2	N/A
Labour	Robert Jones	1,015	27.5	N/A
Labour	Jeorgina Soares	991	26.9	N/A
Green	Taiwo Bodunrin	945	25.6	N/A
Labour	Elizabeth Kangethe	945	25.6	−43.0
Green	Syful Islam	924	25.1	N/A
Green	Marzia Khatun	821	22.3	N/A
Conservative	Sonjoy Roy	312	8.5	N/A
Conservative	Chika Nwokorie	287	7.8	N/A
Conservative	Md Meraj Hossain	281	7.6	N/A
Liberal Democrats	Zulifqar Khan	132	3.6	N/A
Turnout		3,687	36.5	+14.6
Registered electors		10,093		
Reform gain from Labour		Swing		
Reform gain from Labour		Swing		
Reform gain from Labour		Swing		

=== 2022 election ===
The election took place on 5 May 2022.

2022 Barking and Dagenham London Borough Council election: Parsloes
Party	Candidate	Votes	%	±%
Labour	Chris Rice	1,558	31.6	N/A
Labour	Elizabeth Kangethe	1,506	30.5	N/A
Labour	Hardial Singh Rai	1,296	26.3	N/A
Conservative	Tilly Wijesuriya	577	11.7	N/A
Turnout		2,194	21.9	N/A
Registered electors		6,956		
Labour win (new boundaries)				
Labour win (new boundaries)				
Labour win (new boundaries)				

== 2002–2022 Barking and Dagenham council elections ==
There was a revision of ward boundaries in Barking and Dagenham in 2002.

=== 2018 election ===
The election took place on 3 May 2018.

=== 2014 election ===
The election took place on 22 May 2014.

=== 2010 election ===
The election on 6 May 2010 took place on the same day as the United Kingdom general election.

=== 2006 election ===
The election took place on 4 May 2006.

=== 2002 election ===
The election took place on 2 May 2002.

== 1978–2002 Barking and Dagenham council elections ==
The name of the borough and council changed from Barking to Barking and Dagenham on 1 January 1980.

=== 1998 election ===
The election took place on 7 May 1998.

=== 1995 by-election ===
The by-election took place on 9 November 1995, following the death of Joseph Butler.

1995 Parsloes by-election
Party	Candidate	Votes	%	±%
Labour	Steven Gill	604	57.1	+8.0
Independent Labour	John Broughton	360	34.1	−2.9
Liberal Democrats	Alan Cooper	93	8.8	−5.1
Majority		244	23.0	N/A
Turnout			22.3	−16.5
Registered electors				
Labour hold		Swing		

=== 1994 election ===
The election took place on 5 May 1994.

=== 1990 election ===
The election took place on 3 May 1990.

=== 1986 election ===
The election took place on 8 May 1986.

=== 1982 election ===
The election took place on 6 May 1982.

=== 1978 election ===
The election took place on 4 May 1978.

1978 Barking London Borough Council election: Parsloes
Party	Candidate	Votes	%	±%
Labour	Mabel Arnold	1,092	61.1	N/A
Labour	Millicent Preston	1,057		N/A
Conservative	Janet Barnett	486	27.2	N/A
Liberal	Daniel Felton	209	11.7	N/A
Turnout			32.5	N/A
Registered electors		5,307		
Labour win (new seat)				
Labour win (new seat)				
