= Walbrook Wharf =

Freight wharf in the City of London

Coordinates: 51.510°N 0.092°W

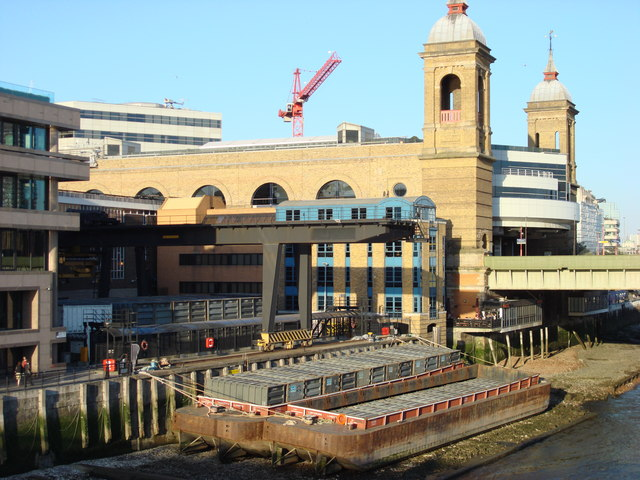
Walbrook Wharf and Cannon Street railway station

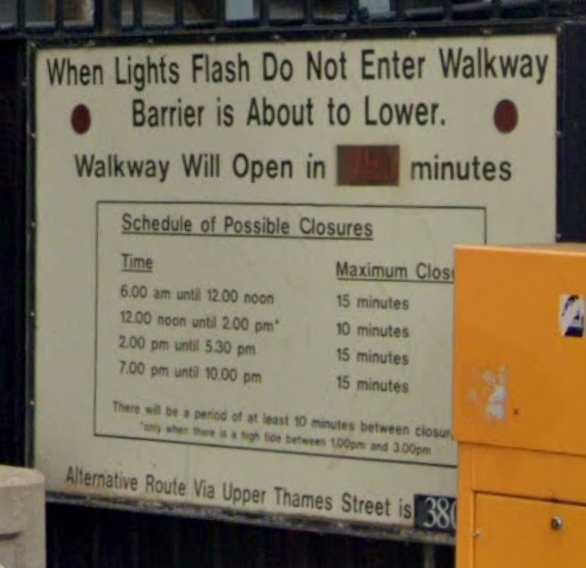
Sign showing walkway closures

Walbrook Wharf is an operating freight wharf in the Port of London located in the City of London adjacent to Cannon Street station. It has been given safeguarded wharf status by the Mayor of London and the Port of London Authority (PLA).

The wharf is used as a waste transfer station owned by the City of London Corporation and operated by Cory Environmental. Refuse from central London is transferred onto barges for transport to the Belvedere Incinerator in the London Borough of Bexley.

Walbrook Wharf was formerly arranged as a dock, but modern containerised loading has resulted in the infilling of the dock. The wharf is the point where the ancient stream, the Walbrook fed into the Thames, a location also known as Dowgate.

The riverside walk runs along Walbrook Wharf and is closed to pedestrians at this point only when waste is being transferred onto barges.
