= 2010 Barking and Dagenham London Borough Council election =

2010 local election in England

2010 Barking and Dagenham Council election
- 6 May 2010

All 51 council seats
	First party	Second party
	Lab	BNP
Party	Labour	BNP
Last election	38 seats, 41.2%	12 seats, 17.2%
Seats won	51	0
Seat change	▲13	▼12
Popular vote	39,925	15,092
Percentage	47.2	17.8
Swing	▲6.0%	▲0.6%
- Map of the results of the 2010 Barking and Dagenham council election. Labour in red.
Leader of Largest Party before election
Labour
Subsequent Leader of Largest Party
Labour

The 2010 Barking and Dagenham Council election took place on 6 May 2010 to elect members of Barking and Dagenham London Borough Council in London, England.

The whole council was up for election, and the Labour Party retained control of the council winning all of the seats. The British National Party lost all the seats they had gained in 2006. The Conservatives lost their only remaining seat, and the Liberal Democrats failed to regain any seats they had lost four years earlier.

The 2010 general election was held on the same day, which increased turnout. The elections took place on the same day as other local elections in 2010.

At the 2006 election, Labour Party had won 38 seats, the British National Party 12 and the Conservatives 1.

== Background ==
188 candidates were nominated in total. Labour Party again ran a full slate (51) and was the only party to do so. By contrast, the Conservatives ran 41 candidates, the Liberal Democrats ran 20, and the British National Party ran 34, whilst there were 20 Independent candidates.

== Election results ==
Barking and Dagenham local election results 2010
Party	Seats	Gains	Losses	Net gain/loss	Seats %	Votes %	Votes	+/−
Labour	51	13	0	+13	100.0	47.2	39,925	+6.0
BNP	0	0	12	-12	0.0	17.8	15,092	+0.6
Conservative	0	0	1	-1	0.0	16.1	13,641	-2.5
Liberal Democrats	0	0	0	±0.0	0.0	11.1	9,385	+9.5
Independent	0	0	0	±0.0	0.0	3.4	2,917	-1.3
UKIP	0	0	0	±0.0	0.0	3.4	2,898	-9.8
Christian	0	0	0	±0.0	0.0	0.7	571	N/A
Green	0	0	0	±0.0	0.0	0.3	213	-3.2

== Ward results ==
=== Abbey ===
Abbey
Party	Candidate	Votes	%	±%
Labour	Laila Butt	3,412	67.1	+2.8
Labour	Manzoor Hussain	3,139		
Labour	Tariq Saeed	3,122		
Conservative	John William Taylor	671	13.2	−22.5
Conservative	Mohammed Chaudhry Iqbal	650		
Liberal Democrats	Anthony Gomes	603	11.9	N/A
Conservative	Shahidur Rahman	546		
BNP	Brian John Tunney	326	6.4	N/A
Independent	Zakir Parvaj	72	1.4	N/A
Turnout		4,712	58.0	+28.1
Registered electors		8,110		
Labour hold		Swing		
Labour hold		Swing		
Labour hold		Swing		

=== Alibon ===
Alibon
Party	Candidate	Votes	%	±%
Labour	Darren Rodwell	2,245	48.1	+13.5
Labour	John Davis	2,135		
Labour	Sanchia Alasia	1,995		
BNP	Robert William Bailey	1,209	25.9	−15.8
BNP	Gavin Cardy	1,111		
BNP	Giuseppe Di Santis	977		
Conservative	Vivian Patten	687	14.7	+2.4
Liberal Democrats	Richard David Ryder	529	11.3	N/A
Turnout		4,127	59.0	+17.9
Registered electors		6,971		
Labour gain from BNP		Swing		
Labour gain from BNP		Swing		
Labour hold		Swing		

=== Becontree ===
Becontree
Party	Candidate	Votes	%	±%
Labour	Evelyn Carpenter	2,444	45.3	−2.0
Labour	Rob Douglas	2,387		
Labour	James Ogungbose	2,171		
BNP	Terence Matthews	1,038	19.3	N/A
Conservative	Patrice King	759	14.1	−10.4
Conservative	Roshan Arawwawala	614		
Liberal Democrats	Chris Watson	584	10.8	N/A
Independent	Alok Agrawal	375	7.0	N/A
Independent	Corinne Angela Lowe	268		
Independent	Rick Lowe	252		
Christian	Paula Denise Watson	192	3.6	N/A
Christian	Robert Ralph	191		
Christian	Benjamin David Conway	179		
Turnout		4,538	60.2	+27.8
Registered electors		7,535		
Labour hold		Swing		
Labour hold		Swing		
Labour hold		Swing		

=== Chadwell Heath ===
Chadwell Heath
Party	Candidate	Votes	%	±%
Labour	Milton McKenzie	1,984	39.3	+1.6
Labour	Jeff Wade	1,818		
Labour	Sam Tarry	1,785		
Conservative	Terry Justice	1,411	27.9	+2.0
Conservative	Maire Justice	1,306		
Conservative	Cathal Gough	1,121		
BNP	George Wilfred Woodward	594	11.8	N/A
Liberal Democrats	Gina Tracy Probert	481	9.5	N/A
UKIP	Kerry James Daryl Luke Smith	369	7.3	−5.9
Green	Debbie Ann Rosaman	213	4.2	N/A
Green	Angie Cooke	201		
Green	Mike Ridout	159		
Turnout		4,210	61.4	+29.2
Registered electors		6,859		
Labour hold		Swing		
Labour hold		Swing		
Labour hold		Swing		

=== Eastbrook ===
Eastbrook
Party	Candidate	Votes	%	±%
Labour	Mick McCarthy	2,295	44.1	−6.2
Labour	Pam Burgon	2,026		
Labour	Tony Ramsay	1,854		
Conservative	Neil Stuart Connelly	1,232	23.7	−26.0
Conservative	Sue Connelly	1,201		
Conservative	Daniel Jonathon Sunley-Smith	1,066		
BNP	Tony Knight	903	17.5	N/A
BNP	Christine Anne Knight	900		
BNP	John David Lillywhite	794		
Liberal Democrats	Oluwole Alabi Taiwo	392	7.5	N/A
UKIP	Leslie Richard Chapman	378	7.3	N/A
Turnout		4,706	63.0	+8.9
Registered electors		7,466		
Labour hold		Swing		
Labour gain from Conservative		Swing		
Labour hold		Swing		

=== Eastbury ===
Eastbury
Party	Candidate	Votes	%	±%
Labour	Jeanne Alexander	2,104	44.3	+16.0
Labour	Jim McDermott	1,958		
Labour	Hardial Singh Rai	1,824		
BNP	Jeffrey Christopher Marshall	942	19.8	−12.6
BNP	Trevor Thomas William Wade	742		
Liberal Democrats	Mohammed Riaz	684	14.4	−1.0
Liberal Democrats	Terry London	633		
Liberal Democrats	David Lawrence De Cruz	567		
Conservative	Danny Searle	457	9.6	N/A
Conservative	Hasan Gul	432		
UKIP	Ronald Dennis Chapman	430	9.1	−7.0
Conservative	Richard Semitego	357		
Independent	Dianne Challis	134	2.8	N/A
Independent	Danny Munroe	70		
Turnout		4,380	59.4	+20.0
Registered electors		7,374		
Labour gain from BNP		Swing		
Labour hold		Swing		
Labour hold		Swing		

=== Gascoigne ===
Gascoigne
Party	Candidate	Votes	%	±%
Labour	Saima Ashraf	2,725	56.2	−2.6
Labour	Abdul Aziz	2,668		
Labour	Dominic Twomey	2,576		
BNP	John Craig Fergie	536	11.1	N/A
Conservative	Sherry Baig	499	10.3	−11.5
Liberal Democrats	Chukwuma Okoruwe	456	9.4	N/A
Independent	Val Rush	436	9.1	N/A
Conservative	Kizito Godfrey Sekisonge	390		
Conservative	Slava Ibelgauptas	357		
Independent	Maggie Mitchell	311		
Independent	Colin Nigel Ward	219		
Christian	Frank Ezebuenyi	196	4.0	N/A
Christian	Patrick Oronsaye	175		
Turnout		4,217	58.4	+25.4
Registered electors		7,222		
Labour hold		Swing		
Labour hold		Swing		
Labour hold		Swing		

=== Goresbrook ===
Goresbrook
Party	Candidate	Votes	%	±%
Labour	Graham Letchford	2,142	43.6	+8.0
Labour	Louise Couling	1,963		
Labour	Jim Clee	1,872		
BNP	Richard Barnbrook	1,340	27.2	−15.2
BNP	Edward Mark Butler	1,146		
BNP	Shell Brunt	1,128		
Conservative	George Daniel Naylor	644	13.1	+2.1
Conservative	Christopher Newton	533		
Liberal Democrats	Felicia Taiwo	457	9.3	N/A
Liberal Democrats	Nzingha Talibah Shukura	432		
Independent	Warren William Northover	335	6.8	N/A
Turnout		4,323	57.8	+16.4
Registered electors		7,482		
Labour gain from BNP		Swing		
Labour gain from BNP		Swing		
Labour hold		Swing		

=== Heath ===
Heath
Party	Candidate	Votes	%	±%
Labour	Linda Ann Reason	2,286	48.5	−0.1
Labour	Dave Miles	2,241		
Labour	Gerry Vincent	1,952		
BNP	Sally Lister	969	20.6	N/A
BNP	Paul Leslie William Sturdy	844		
BNP	Robert Michael Taylor	802		
Conservative	Neil Edgar Hallewell	676	14.3	−7.5
Conservative	Richard James Smith	585		
Conservative	Barbara Ann Towler	522		
Liberal Democrats	Angela London	447	9.5	N/A
UKIP	Yvonne Philippa Litwin	337	7.1	−22.6
Turnout		4,173	58.9	+24.6
Registered electors		7,083		
Labour hold		Swing		
Labour hold		Swing		
Labour hold		Swing		

=== Longbridge ===
Longbridge
Party	Candidate	Votes	%	±%
Labour	Rocky Gill	3,292	45.3	+19.1
Labour	Nirmal Gill	2,900		
Labour	Lynda Rice	2,559		
Liberal Democrats	Mohammod Jalal Uddin	1,239	17.1	N/A
Conservative	Paul Ayer	1,221	16.8	−8.4
Conservative	Foyzur Rahman	1,109		
BNP	Bede Ewing Smith	677	9.3	N/A
Independent	Edward Leigh Gosling	452	6.2	−15.9
Independent	Eileen Mary Gosling	388		
UKIP	John Walter Dias-Broughton	383	5.3	−9.1
Independent	Tony Richards	369		
Conservative	Komel Bajwe	316		
Independent	Julie Munroe	167		
Turnout		5,493	69.1	+20.6
Registered electors		7,950		
Labour hold		Swing		
Labour hold		Swing		
Labour hold		Swing		

=== Mayesbrook ===
Mayesbrook
Party	Candidate	Votes	%	±%
Labour	Dee Hunt	1,908	39.5	+11.1
Labour	Ralph Baldwin	1,777		
Labour	George Barratt	1,705		
BNP	Tracy Anne Lansdown	1,123	23.2	−15.2
BNP	Robert John Anthony Buckley	1,109		
BNP	Mandy Matthews	1,024		
Conservative	Tom O'Brien	778	16.1	+7.7
Liberal Democrats	Funke Adesanoye	528	10.9	N/A
UKIP	Bert Bedwell	496	10.3	−14.6
Turnout		3,991	59.5	+19.1
Registered electors		6,713		
Labour gain from BNP		Swing		
Labour gain from BNP		Swing		
Labour hold		Swing		

=== Parsloes ===
Parsloes
Party	Candidate	Votes	%	±%
Labour	Bert Collins	2,158	47.8	+7.3
Labour	Elizabeth Kangethe	1,935		
Labour	Chris Ric	1,913		
BNP	Leigh Friend	1,022	22.6	−20.6
BNP	Christopher Walter Charles Forster	941		
BNP	Anthony Stephen McKay	867		
Conservative	Ronald Armstrong	763	16.9	N/A
Liberal Democrats	Frederick Egbeson	575	12.7	N/A
Turnout		3,848	57.8	+20.7
Registered electors		6,662		
Labour gain from BNP		Swing		
Labour gain from BNP		Swing		
Labour hold		Swing		

=== River ===
River
Party	Candidate	Votes	%	±%
Labour	Liam Anthony Smith	2,406	48.4	−2.5
Labour	Eileen Sandra Keller	2,308		
Labour	Inder Singh Jamu	2,284		
BNP	Scott Jones	933	18.8	N/A
BNP	Victoria Jane Pengelly	853		
Conservative	Jean Margaret Cockling	576	11.6	−8.9
UKIP	Nobby Manning	505	10.2	−18.4
Conservative	Ronald Cole Bairstow	493		
Conservative	Chris Nwokebuife	404		
Liberal Democrats	Martha Nosa Ogbonmwan	367	7.4	N/A
Christian	Arinola Araba	183	3.7	N/A
Turnout		4,265	61.2	+25.5
Registered electors		6,971		
Labour hold		Swing		
Labour hold		Swing		
Labour hold		Swing		

=== Thames ===
Thames
Party	Candidate	Votes	%	±%
Labour	Josephine Channer	2,067	49.4	−2.1
Labour	Barry Poulton	2,042		
Labour	Cameron Geddes	1,978		
BNP	Roy Evans	716	17.1	N/A
BNP	Andrew James Todd	661		
Independent	Fred Barns	610	14.6	−14.8
Conservative	Mark Victor Courtier	422	10.1	−9.0
Liberal Democrats	Saifur Rahman	366	8.8	N/A
Conservative	Moin Ali Quadri	347		
Conservative	Lauretta Ifeanyi Onochie	322		
Independent	Pam Dumbleton	307		
Independent	Terry Wade	268		
Turnout		3,745	60.6	+29.8
Registered electors		6,179		
Labour hold		Swing		
Labour hold		Swing		
Labour hold		Swing		

=== Valence ===
Valence
Party	Candidate	Votes	%	±%
Labour	Maureen Worby	1,803	40.8	+5.4
Labour	Emmanuel Obasohan	1,723		
Labour	Abdus Salam	1,610		
BNP	Christopher Roberts	1,112	25.2	−15.1
BNP	Lawrence Rustem	995		
BNP	Kara Michelle Walker	963		
Conservative	Neil Joseph Robert Butcher	827	18.7	N/A
Liberal Democrats	Alan Albert Blood	672	15.2	N/A
Turnout		3,803	57.4	+17.6
Registered electors		6,622		
Labour gain from BNP		Swing		
Labour gain from BNP		Swing		
Labour hold		Swing		

=== Village ===
Village
Party	Candidate	Votes	%	±%
Labour	Lee Walker	2,454	49.4	+12.2
Labour	Phil Waker	2,303		
Labour	Margaret Mullane	2,259		
BNP	Len Bird	1,049	21.1	−14.7
Conservative	Malcolm Beatty	906	18.3	+7.5
Conservative	Roy Alan Zelkin	654		
Conservative	Sammy Omosule	587		
Liberal Democrats	Robert Graham Hills	555	11.2	+2.8
Turnout		4,239	59.0	+16.8
Registered electors		7,185		
Labour hold		Swing		
Labour hold		Swing		
Labour gain from BNP		Swing		

=== Whalebone ===
Whalebone
Party	Candidate	Votes	%	±%
Labour	Tony Harry Perry	2,200	45.2	−10.9
Labour	Amardeep Singh Jamu	2,103		
Labour	John Robert White	2,085		
Conservative	Christine Mary Naylor	1,112	22.8	+21.1
Conservative	Emran Uddin	794		
Conservative	Wale Oguntona	788		
BNP	Robin Lee Lillywhite	603	12.4	N/A
Independent	John Robert Denyer	503	10.3	N/A
Liberal Democrats	Maxine Lisa London	450	9.2	N/A
Independent	Ingrid Robinson	350		
Independent	Zac Robinson	276		
Turnout		4,545	64.2	+38.0
Registered electors		7,076		
Labour hold		Swing		
Labour hold		Swing		
Labour hold		Swing		

== By-elections between 2010 and 2014 ==
=== Goresbrook ===
Goresbrook by-election, 8 July 2010
Party	Candidate	Votes	%	±%
Labour	Louise Couling	881	46.6	+3.0
BNP	Richard Barnbrook	642	34.0	+6.8
Liberal Democrats	Felicia Taiwo	136	7.2	−2.1
Conservative	Paul Ayer	108	5.7	−7.4
Independent	Warren Northover	63	3.9	−2.9
UKIP	Nobby Manning	50	2.6	+2.6
Independent	Faruk Ahmed Choudhury	11	0.1	−2.9
Majority		239	12.6	−3.8
Turnout		1,841	25.3	−32.5
Registered electors		7,482		
Labour hold		Swing		

The by-election was called following the voiding of the election of Cllr Louise Couling as she was ruled ineligible.

Goresbrook by-election, 19 April 2012
Party	Candidate	Votes	%	±%
Labour	Simon Brenner	1,113	57.8	+14.2
BNP	Bob Taylor	593	30.8	+3.5
UKIP	John Dias-Broughton	91	4.7	+4.7
Conservative	Mohammed Riaz	81	4.2	−8.9
Liberal Democrats	Robert Hills	48	2.5	−6.8
Majority		520	20.0	+10.7
Turnout		1,926	25.6	−32.2
Registered electors				
Labour hold		Swing		

The by-election was called following the resignation of Cllr Louise Couling for reasons of ill health.

=== Longbridge ===
Longbridge by-election, 9 May 2013
Party	Candidate	Votes	%	±%
Labour	Syed Ahammad	1,555	64.3	+24.1
UKIP	Albert Bedwell	466	19.3	+14.6
Conservative	Paul Ayer	284	11.7	−3.2
Liberal Democrats	David Croft	78	3.2	−11.9
BNP	Giuseppe De Santis	37	1.5	−6.7
Majority		1,089	45.0	
Turnout		2,420	29.8	−39.3
Registered electors				
Labour hold		Swing		

The by-election was called following the death of Cllr Nirmal Gill.
