= Ford Dagenham =

Automotive factory in London

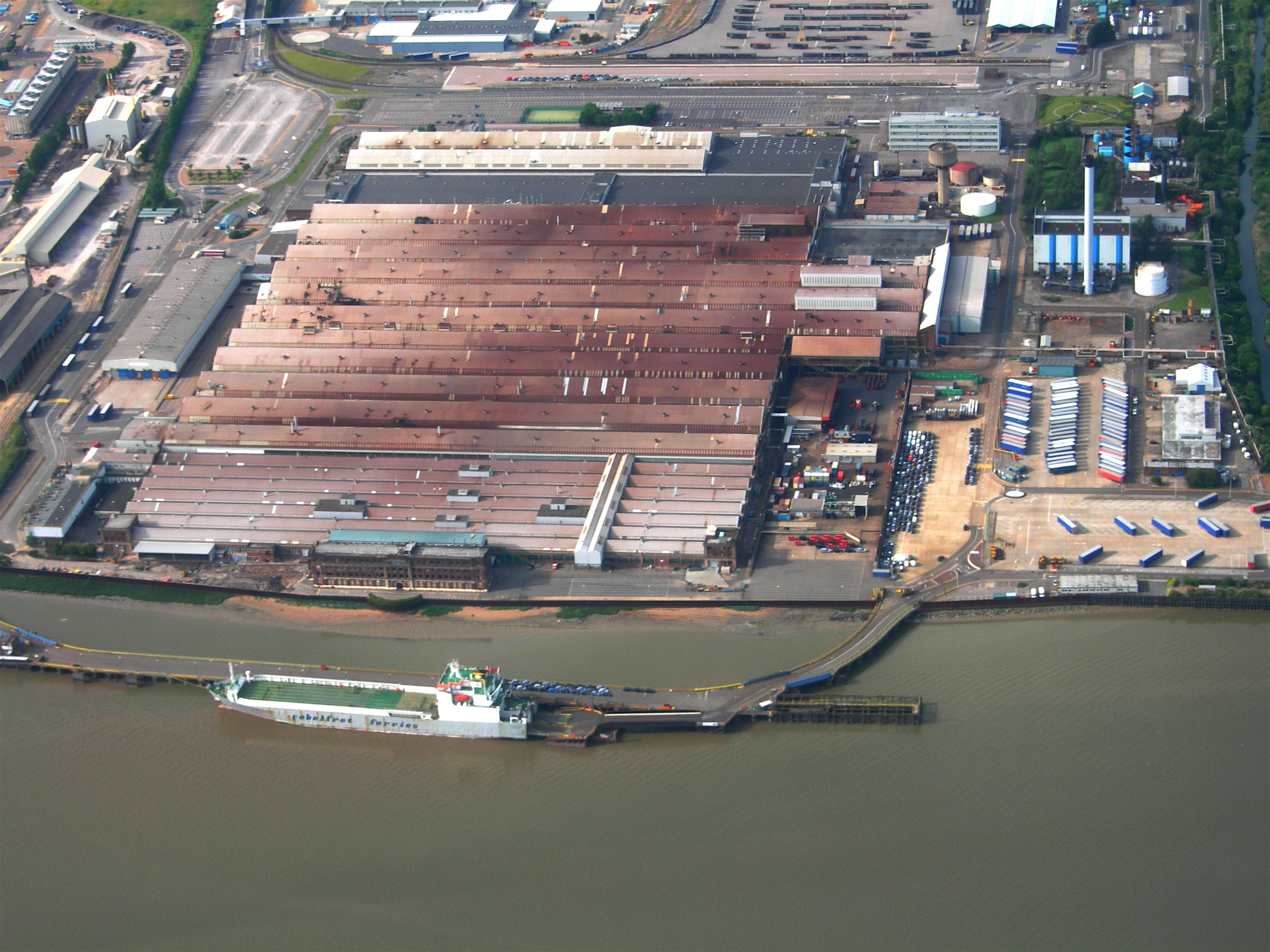
- Operated: 1931–present
- Location: Dagenham, London, England
- Coordinates: 51°30′54″N 0°9′11″E
- Industry: Automotive
- Products: Engines
- Employees: 2,000 (approx.)
- Area: 475 acres (192 ha)

Ford Dagenham is a major automotive factory located in Dagenham, London, operated by the Ford of Britain subsidiary of Ford Motor Company. The plant opened in 1931 and has produced 10,980,368 cars and more than 39,000,000 engines in its history. It covers around 475 acres and has received over £800 million of capital investment since 2000.

Vehicle assembly ceased at the plant in 2002, but it continues as a major production site with capacity to assemble 1.4 million engines a year. In 2008, the plant produced around 1,050,000 engines and was the largest producer of Ford diesel engines globally. Ford announced in October 2012 that the stamping plant at Dagenham would close in summer 2013 with the loss of 1,000 jobs. Employment at the plant peaked at around 40,000 workers in 1953.

Following the change to only building engines, it now employs around 2,000 people.

== History ==
=== Origins to 1945 ===
Planning of the Dagenham plant began in the early 1920s, a time when lorries were small and road networks little developed. In the UK, bulk supplies were still delivered by water transport, so the Dagenham plant, like the Ford Trafford Park plant which it would replace, needed good water access. Dagenham on the southern estuarial edge of Essex offered the prospect of a deepwater port which would allow for bulk deliveries of coal and steel on a far larger scale than the barges of the Manchester Ship Canal could manage at the old plant. In 1924, Ford Motor Company purchased land in the Dagenham marshes for £167,700.

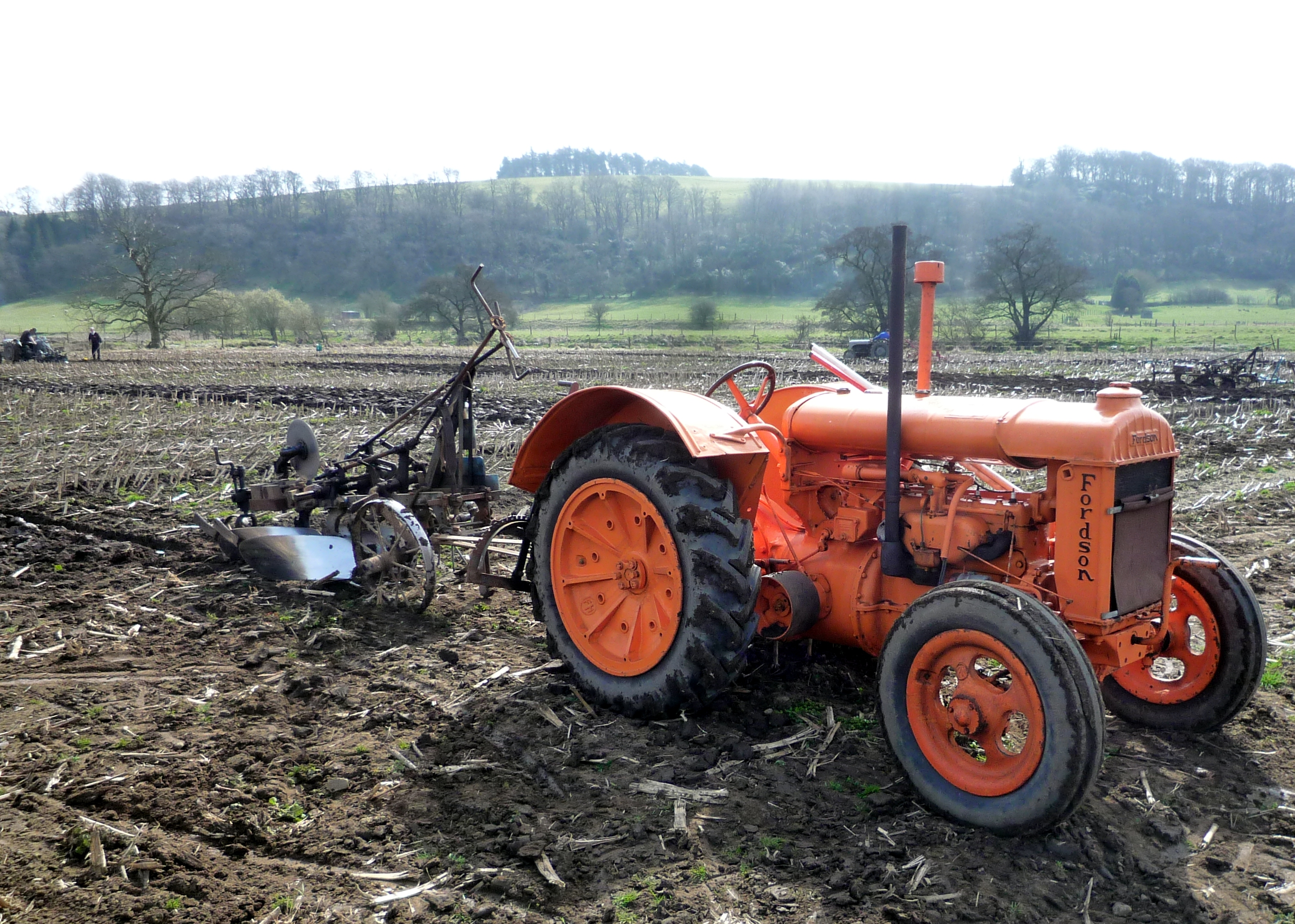
Production of Fordson tractors for the British market in the Dagenham plant began in 1933, following the imposition of an import tariff by the British government on the break-away Irish Free State, where Fordson tractors had been produced in Cork City, Ireland.

The Dagenham plant began producing Fordson tractors in 1933. This was originally the task of the plant in Cork City, Ireland (the first purpose-built Ford manufacturing plant to be located outside of the United States), however, following the establishment of the Irish Free State (which broke away from the United Kingdom) in December 1922, the British government imposed a tariff on the import of Free State manufactured goods into Great Britain. This made the production cost of Ford machinery for the British tractor market largely un-economical. All tractors assembled in Cork City were instead shipped to the US for distribution, with production of tractors suspended in this plant from 1923 to 1928. While production of Fordson tractors resumed in Cork City in 1928, this function was moved permanently from the Cork City plant to the Dagenham plant in Greater London, England, in 1933.

On 17 May 1929, Edsel Ford marked the start of construction on the site by cutting the first turf in the marshes. Construction on the site continued for 28 months and required around 22,000 concrete piles to be driven down through the clay of the marshland site to adequately support a factory that from the start was planned to incorporate its own steel foundry and coal-fired power station.

At the time when the plant was planned, western governments were increasingly responding to economic depression with protectionist policies. This was the context in which Henry Ford’s policy of setting up relatively autonomous car-manufacturing businesses in principal overseas markets can be seen. The drive for self-reliance implicit in including within the Dagenham plant its own steel foundry and power station nevertheless went beyond anything attempted by other European mass-production automakers such as Morris in England, Opel in Germany, or Citroën in France. Inspiration for Ford's Dagenham plant came more directly from Ford's own Rouge River plant on the edge of Detroit. The once iconic powerplant was a late addition to the site planning and as a result was on 'difficult' ground on the edge of the one-time marsh. In his autobiography, Sir Harold Harding gave an account of the sobering lessons it taught him early in his long and influential career.

The first vehicle out of the Dagenham plant was a Ford AA van, produced in October 1931. However, the British economy was in a depressed condition at this time, and the surviving local market for light trucks was dominated by Morris Commercial products. Production at Ford's Dagenham plant got off to a slow start, but picked up as the British economy recovered, so that by 1937, the plant produced 37,000 vehicles, an annual total that would not be exceeded until 1953. Most of the output of the Dagenham plant during the 1930s consisted of various editions of the Ford 8, a successful model first built at Dagenham in 1932, which probably inspired the even more successful Morris 8, first produced at Cowley in 1935 by the UK market leader of the late 1930s.

Wartime production included large numbers of vans and trucks along with Bren gun carriers. The plant produced numerous 'special purpose' engines. Agricultural vehicles were also an important element: at one point, the Fordson represented 95% of UK tractor production.

=== 1945 to 2000 ===
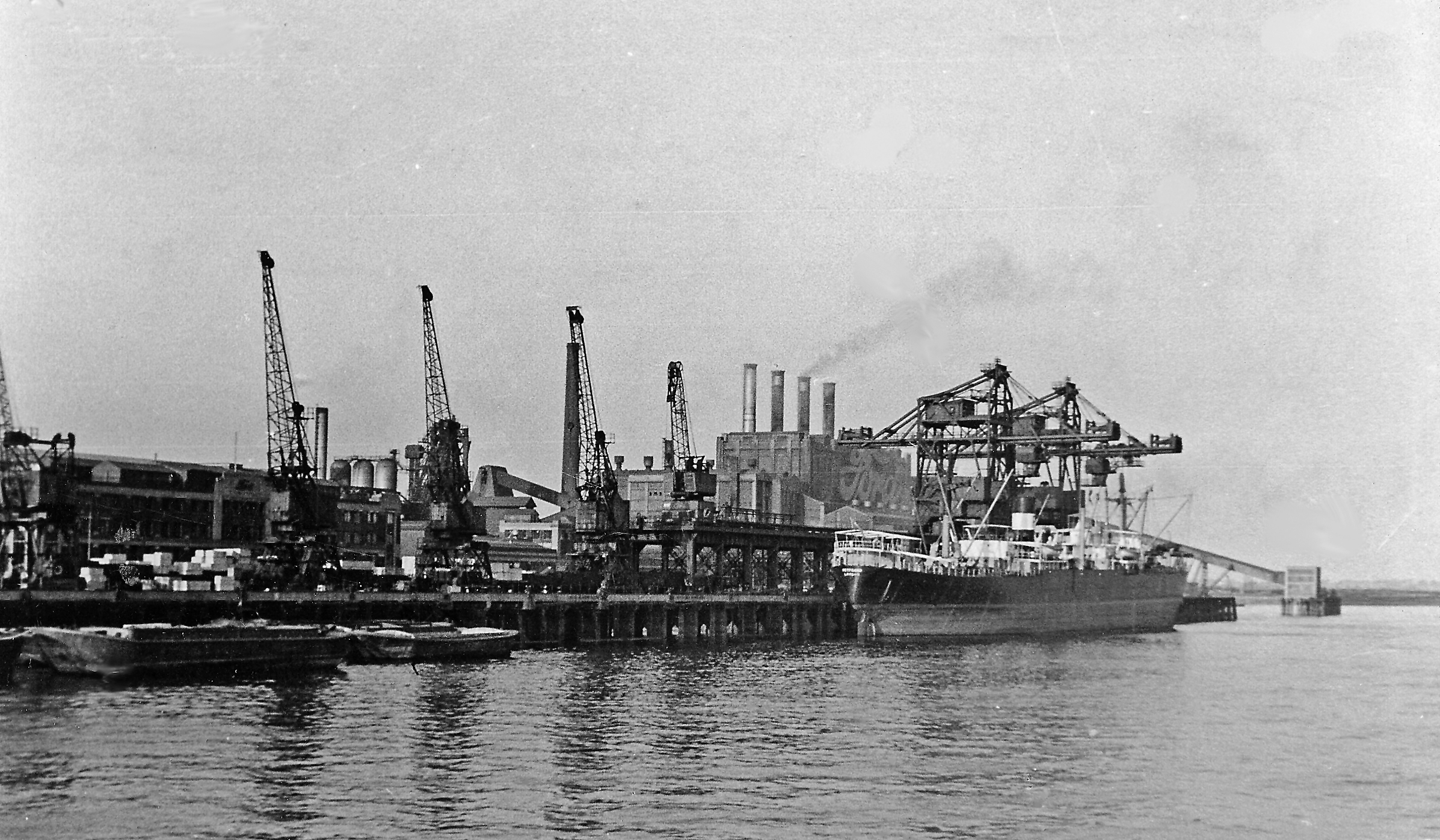
Jetty on Thames serving the works in 1950

After the Second World War, Ford's UK operation set the pace for the UK auto industry, and Dagenham products included models such as the Zephyr, Cortina, and (until production of Ford's smaller saloons transferred to Halewood), the Anglia. The 1950s was a decade of expansion: a £75 million plant redevelopment completed in 1959 increased floor space by 50% and doubled production capacity. This went hand-in-hand with the concentration in-house of car body assembly, following the acquisition in 1953 of the company's principal UK body supplier, Briggs Motor Bodies.

In the 1960s, Ford finally began to merge its previously competing British, German and the lesser competing Ford of Ireland subsidiaries, culminating in the creation of Ford of Europe in 1967 in Cork, Ireland. The new entity began to systematically merge the once-separate product lineups from Dagenham and Cologne. The 1960s saw several European automakers, including Ford, investing in new assembly plants on greenfield sites. Dagenham was, by 1970, becoming one of the Europe's older mass-production car plants. In 1970, production of the Ford Escort began at the new Saarlouis factory in West Germany.

By this time, the UK auto industry was gaining a reputation for poor industrial relations, with a particularly lengthy strike leading to a three-month shut-down at the Dagenham plant at the start of the summer of 1971. This savaged availability of the Ford Cortina Mk III during its crucial first year. By the time the Ford Cortina Mk IV was introduced to UK customers, the cars inherited several Ford UK engines but were, in other respects, virtually identical to those branded in left-hand drive European markets as Ford Taunus models. Saarlouis was joined in 1976 by another new European plant in Valencia, Spain, to produce the then-new Ford Fiesta concurrently with Dagenham. The same European strategy was followed by Ford's US rival General Motors, which in the 1970s, also merged the operations of its previously independent Opel and Vauxhall subsidiaries, with similar results.

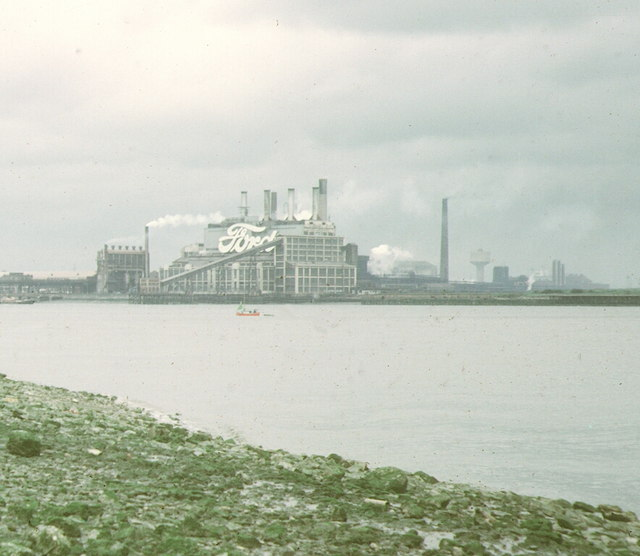
Ford Dagenham in 1973, displaying what was at the time the largest neon sign in Europe

This decision to concurrently manufacture the same models in other European plants reduced the company's vulnerability to further industrial disruption at Dagenham, and gave Ford a crucial advantage over strike-torn domestic rival British Leyland, which was often unable to fulfill customer orders during the all too frequent times of industrial unrest in the 1970s, and eventually ceded its long-standing UK market leadership to Ford, something from which it would never recover, but the duplication of production also made cost comparisons between the company's various European plants increasingly stark. During the closing decade of the 20th century, UK government policy and the country's status as a major oil producer left the UK with a currency which by several conventional criteria was significantly overvalued against the German Mark and the currencies that tracked it. This tended to exacerbate any cost penalties arising from relative inefficiencies in the Dagenham plant's operation, and new model investment decisions during the 1990s tended to favour mainland Europe. For instance, the Sierra for the European market had its right-hand drive models made at Dagenham and the left-hand drive models in Belgium; in 1990, though, all Sierra production was concentrated in Belgium, leaving the Fiesta as the only model being built at Dagenham. The Sierra's successor, the Mondeo (launched in early 1993), was also built in Belgium. However, Dagenham did become a two-model plant again in January 1996 with the introduction of the Mazda 121 - essentially a badge-engineered Fiesta - as part of a venture with Mazda until its demise four years later.

=== 2001 to present ===
By 2001, the only Ford produced at Dagenham was the Fiesta, itself competing in an increasingly crowded market sector. The lead plant for Fiesta production was in Spain, however. Faced with a cyclical downturn in car demand across Europe, Ford took the decision not to tool the Dagenham plant for the replacement Fiesta due for launch in 2002, which was the year in which the company produced its last Dagenham-built Ford Fiesta. Mindful of its image as a good corporate British citizen, the company stressed that the plant's engine-building capacity would be further developed to "help the UK to become the producer of one in every four Ford engines the world over".

The site has also been the location of the Dagenham wind turbines since 2004.

From May 2012 an area to the north east of the site, by then cleared of the vacant Ford buildings, was used as a secretive rehearsal site for the London 2012 Olympic opening and closing ceremonies. Two areas were marked out to the same scale as the stadium so two sections could be rehearsed at the same time, with a big tent erected as a base of operations for the production team and the hundreds of volunteer performers.

Ford announced in October 2012 that the stamping plant activities at Dagenham would cease in summer 2013. Some additional jobs would be created in the engine-assembly departments at Dagenham, but the GMB Union claimed that 1,000 jobs would be lost, saying, "This is devastating news for the workforce in Southampton and Dagenham. It's also devastating news for UK manufacturing," according to the BBC. The stamping plant was demolished between 2016 and 2020 to make way for housing. In 2022, it was announced that the Dagenham Green development of 3,500 homes will be built on the stamping plant site. The village will have a five-acre park at its centre.

The Engine Plant (the original building from 1931) and the Dagenham Diesel Centre (DDC) still produce close to 1 million diesel engines a year which are shipped worldwide.

== See also ==
- Ford sewing machinists strike of 1968
