= 2006 Barking and Dagenham London Borough Council election =

2006 local election in England

2006 Barking and Dagenham Council election
- 4 May 2006

All 51 council seats to Barking and Dagenham Council 26 seats needed for a majority
	First party	Second party	Third party
	Lab	BNP	Con
Party	Labour	BNP	Conservative
Last election	42 seats, 55.6%	Did not stand	2 seats, 13.8%
Seats won	38	12	1
Seat change	▼4	▲12	▼1
Popular vote	20,611	8,576	9,315
Percentage	41.2	17.2	18.6
Swing	▼14.4%	New party	▲4.8%
- Map of the results of the 2006 Barking and Dagenham council election. Labour in red, British National Party in dark blue and Conservatives in blue.
Leader of Largest Party before election
Labour
Subsequent Leader of Largest Party
Labour

Elections for Barking and Dagenham London Borough Council were held on Thursday 4 May 2006. The whole council was up for election. Barking and Dagenham is split up into 17 wards, each electing 3 councillors, so a total of 51 seats were up for election.

The Labour Party retained control of the council winning 38 seats and 41% of the popular vote. The British National Party won 12 seats in a rare electoral breakthrough for a far-right party, and formed the official opposition winning 17% of the popular vote. The Conservatives won 1 seat. This was the last election until 2026 that non-Labour councillors were elected and this is the last election that a Conservative councillor was elected.

== Background ==
In the lead up and aftermath of the election, Barking and Dagenham underwent significant demographic change causing a massive rise in support for the British National Party. In the 2001 census, the white British and Irish percent of the borough's population was 82%.

From 2000 to 2011, Barking and Dagenham underwent one of the biggest demographic change in London's history, the proportion of White British residents decreased from 82% to 49%, the largest decrease of White British residents in any unitary authority across Britain, and the second largest proportional decrease, just behind neighboring Newham. A significant amount of White British residents, mainly who were displeased with the massive surge of immigration to the borough, moved out to the home counties, particularly neighbouring Essex, for instance, Cavney Island, a town in Essex, became a hotspot for those moving out of nor only Barking and Dagenham, but also East London boroughs. This trend started in the 80s, mainly in the inner East London boroughs (Tower Hamlets,) Newham and Hackney, with Barking and Dagenham and neigbhbouring Havering actually being a source of destination for many moving, this trend rapidly accelerated in the 2000s and a significant amount of Essex's population can trace their family links to East London.

The proportion of foreign born residences soared by 205%, the black population increased from 6% to 20%, the Asian population went from 4% to 15% and other white went from 3% to 9%. In 2006 estimates placed the White British percent of the borough at around 65-70%. This rapid demographic change caused a surge in support for the BNP, a far right political party whose main focus was on immigration and demographic change. Many White British residents, most who had lived in the borough for generations, found themselves drawn to the BNP solely by the concern of immigration and demographic change.

Whilst the White British population only comprised 57% of their 2001 share, their numerical population declined by around 30% down from

	2001	2011
White British:	139,667	108,386
% of population	82.03%	49.46%

132,566

As stated by the Labour MP for Barking at the time, Margaret Hodge, she said "8 out of 10 of my (White British) constituents were considering or plan to vote for the BNP. Between 2001-2011 she tried to balance the new realities facing the borough and the growing resentment of many long term residents. However, her stance was wildly criticized by both sides, both who saw her trying to appeal excessively to the other side. In the run up to the election, numerous other political figures within the borough accused her of "giving" the BNP votes.

115 candidates were nominated in total. Labour again ran a full slate (51) and was the only party to do so. By contrast the Conservative Party ran only 23 candidates, whilst the Liberal Democrats ran 4 and the BNP ran 13.

== Election results ==
2006 Barking and Dagenham London Borough Council election
Party	Seats	Gains	Losses	Net gain/loss	Seats %	Votes %	Votes	+/−
Labour	38	8	12	–4	74.5	41.2	20,611	-14.4
Conservative	1	1	2	–1	2.0	18.6	9,315	+4.8
BNP	12	12	0	+12	23.5	17.2	8,576	N/A
UKIP	0	0	0	±0	0.0	13.2	6,598	N/A
Independent	0	0	0	±0	0.0	4.7	2,353	+3.9
Green	0	0	0	±0	0.0	3.5	1,730	+2.3
Liberal Democrats	0	0	3	–3	0.0	1.6	810	-21.6
Chadwell Heath RA	0	0	4	–4	0.0	0.0	0	-5.5

== Ward results ==
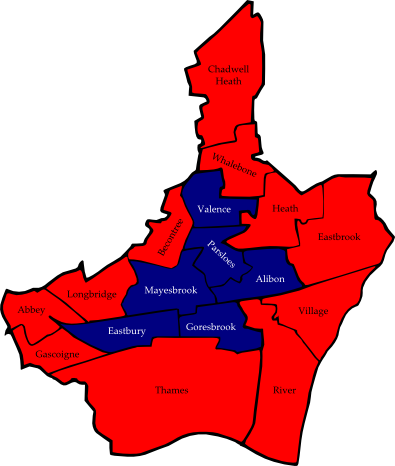
Map of the results of the 2006 Barking and Dagenham council election with ward names. Coloured by party which topped the poll in each ward. Labour in red and British National Party in dark blue.

=== Abbey ===
Abbey (3)
Party	Candidate	Votes	%	±%
Labour	Jeanne Alexander	1,367	64.3	−5.8
Labour	Mohammed Fani	1,275		
Labour	Graham Bramley	1,241		
Conservative	Foyzur Rahman	765	35.7	N/A
Turnout		2,203	29.9	+7.0
Registered electors		7,379		
Labour hold		Swing		
Labour hold		Swing		
Labour hold		Swing		

=== Alibon ===
Alibon (3)
Party	Candidate	Votes	%	±%
BNP	William Bailey	1,329	41.7	N/A
BNP	Claire Doncaster	1,323		
Labour	John Davis	1,071	33.6	−33.8
Labour	Terry Wade	1,018		
Labour	Dave Miles	957		
UKIP	Margaret Whitson	394	12.4	N/A
Conservative	Lucy East	393	12.3	−20.3
Turnout		2,759	41.1	+22.0
Registered electors		6,721		
BNP gain from Labour		Swing		
BNP gain from Labour		Swing		
Labour hold		Swing		

=== Becontree ===
Becontree (3)
Party	Candidate	Votes	%	±%
Labour	Alok Agrawal	1,268	47.3	−18.5
Labour	Evelyn Carpenter	1,240		
Labour	Emmanuel Obasohan	1,058		
UKIP	Daphne Jordon	749	28.1	N/A
Conservative	Claire Barker	653	24.5	N/A
Conservative	Malcolm Barker	607		
Turnout		2,454	32.4	+15.4
Registered electors		7,578		
Labour hold		Swing		
Labour hold		Swing		
Labour hold		Swing		

=== Chadwell Heath ===
Chadwell Heath (3)
Party	Candidate	Votes	%	±%
Labour	Sarah Baillie	1,101	37.7	+6.7
Labour	Nadine Smith	999		
Labour	Shaun Carroll	987		
Conservative	Terry Justice	873	29.9	−3.6
Conservative	Maire Justice	734		
Conservative	Sharron Chytry	583		
Independent	Ronald Curtis	560	19.2	−16.4
UKIP	Doreen Tucker	385	13.2	N/A
UKIP	Ronald Long	376		
Turnout		2,523	36.2	+9.5
Registered electors		6,972		
Labour gain from Residents		Swing		
Labour gain from Residents		Swing		
Labour gain from Conservative		Swing		

=== Eastbrook ===
Eastbrook (3)
Party	Candidate	Votes	%	±%
Labour	Mick McCarthy	1,151	50.3	−1.5
Conservative	Neil Connelly	1,139	49.7	+12.3
Labour	Bob Little	1,126		
Conservative	Sue Connelly	1,101		
Conservative	Susan Smith	1,067		
Labour	Margaret Mullane	1,036		
Turnout		4,070	54.1	+28.5
Registered electors		7,523		
Labour hold		Swing		
Conservative gain from Labour		Swing		
Labour hold		Swing		

=== Eastbury ===
Eastbury (3)
Party	Candidate	Votes	%	±%
BNP	Jeffrey Steed	1,102	32.4	N/A
Labour	James McDermott	965	28.4	−15.2
Labour	Patricia Northover	944		
Labour	Hardial Rai	852		
UKIP	Patrick Manley	546	16.1	N/A
Liberal Democrats	Diane Challis	523	15.4	−41.0
UKIP	Ashley McIlroy	455		
Liberal Democrats	Ryan Edwards	451		
UKIP	Dorien McIlroy	425		
Green	Geoff Sheridan	260	7.7	N/A
Liberal Democrats	Claire Stepton	131		
Turnout		3,031	39.4	+13.6
Registered electors		7,967		
BNP gain from Liberal Democrats		Swing		
Labour gain from Liberal Democrats		Swing		
Labour gain from Liberal Democrats		Swing		

=== Gascoigne ===
Gascoigne (3)
Party	Candidate	Votes	%	±%
Labour	Kathleen Flint	1,579	58.8	−5.9
Labour	Milton McKenzie	1,346		
Labour	Valerie Rush	1,278		
Conservative	Alison Grey	586	21.8	N/A
Green	Hidir Yildirim	522	19.4	+9.1
Turnout		2,361	33.0	+8.8
Registered electors		7,146		
Labour hold		Swing		
Labour hold		Swing		
Labour hold		Swing		

=== Goresbrook ===
Goresbrook (3)
Party	Candidate	Votes	%	±%
BNP	Richard Barnbrook	1,434	42.4	N/A
BNP	Tracy Lansdown	1,357		
Labour	Warren Northover	1,204	35.6	−36.4
Labour	Edna Fergus	1,162		
Labour	Jeffrey Porter	1,135		
Conservative	George Naylor	373	11.0	N/A
UKIP	Terence Jones	367	10.9	N/A
Turnout		3,021	41.4	+21.1
Registered electors		7,298		
BNP gain from Labour		Swing		
BNP gain from Labour		Swing		
Labour hold		Swing		

=== Heath ===
Heath (3)
Party	Candidate	Votes	%	±%
Labour	Charles Fairbrass	1,293	48.6	−9.0
Labour	Linda Reason	1,282		
Labour	Sidney Kallar	1,229		
UKIP	Christine Smith	790	29.7	N/A
Conservative	Harry East	579	21.8	+0.0
Conservative	Margaret White	535		
Turnout		2,534	34.3	+12.5
Registered electors		7,396		
Labour hold		Swing		
Labour hold		Swing		
Labour hold		Swing		

=== Longbridge ===
Longbridge (3)
Party	Candidate	Votes	%	±%
Labour	Sukhninder Gill	1,272	26.2	−16.0
Labour	Nirmal Gill	1,253		
Labour	Gerald Vincent	1,233		
Conservative	Brian Cook	1,227	25.2	−14.2
Conservative	Margaret Cook	1,111		
Independent	Anthony Richards	1,072	22.1	N/A
Conservative	Anthony Chytry	910		
UKIP	James Burchill	701	14.4	N/A
Green	Laurence Cleeland	588	12.1	N/A
Turnout		3,661	48.5	+18.9
Registered electors		7,543		
Labour hold		Swing		
Labour hold		Swing		
Labour gain from Conservative		Swing		

=== Mayesbrook ===
Mayesbrook (3)
Party	Candidate	Votes	%	±%
BNP	Robert Buckley	1,145	38.4	N/A
BNP	Christine Knight	1,070		
Labour	Dee Hunt	845	28.4	−24.0
UKIP	Vivian Patten	741	24.9	N/A
UKIP	Kerry Smith	733		
UKIP	John Bolton	697		
Labour	Dominic Twomey	695		
Labour	Ahmed Choudhury	679		
Conservative	Christopher Newton	249	8.4	N/A
Turnout		2,782	40.4	+19.6
Registered electors		6,886		
BNP gain from Labour		Swing		
BNP gain from Labour		Swing		
Labour hold		Swing		

=== Parsloes ===
Parsloes (3)
Party	Candidate	Votes	%	±%
BNP	Ronald Doncaster	1,120	43.2	N/A
BNP	Darren Tuffs	1,052		
Labour	Herbert Collins	1,050	40.5	−22.2
Labour	Frederick Jones	1,026		
Labour	Catherine Osborn	948		
UKIP	Peter Compobassi	423	16.3	N/A
Turnout		2,465	37.1	+17.2
Registered electors		6,643		
BNP gain from Labour		Swing		
BNP gain from Labour		Swing		
Labour hold		Swing		

=== River ===
River (3)
Party	Candidate	Votes	%	±%
Labour	Liam Smith	1,529	50.9	−18.5
Labour	Patricia Twomey	1,406		
Labour	Inder Jamu	1,304		
UKIP	Betty Parsons	858	28.6	N/A
Conservative	Herbert White	617	20.5	N/A
Turnout		2,649	35.7	+15.3
Registered electors		7,419		
Labour hold		Swing		
Labour hold		Swing		
Labour hold		Swing		

=== Thames ===
Thames (3)
Party	Candidate	Votes	%	±%
Labour	Fred Barns	1,264	51.5	−16.1
Labour	Joan Rawlinson	1,157		
Labour	Barry Poulton	1,127		
Independent	John Dias-Broughton	721	29.4	N/A
Conservative	Thomas Grey	470	19.1	N/A
Turnout		2,224	30.8	+7.1
Registered electors		7,223		
Labour hold		Swing		
Labour hold		Swing		
Labour hold		Swing		

=== Valence ===
Valence (3)
Party	Candidate	Votes	%	±%
BNP	Sandra Doncaster	1,219	40.3	N/A
BNP	Lawrence Rustem	1,203		
Labour	Donald Hemmett	1,071	35.4	−32.2
Labour	Dennis O'Brien	1,005		
Labour	Bryan Osborn	915		
UKIP	Angela Lambart	372	12.3	N/A
Green	Maria Sentivani	360	11.9	N/A
Turnout		2,649	39.8	+19.5
Registered electors		6,662		
BNP gain from Labour		Swing		
BNP gain from Labour		Swing		
Labour hold		Swing		

=== Village ===
Village (3)
Party	Candidate	Votes	%	±%
Labour	Philip Waker	1,276	37.2	−18.0
Labour	Lee Waker	1,269		
BNP	Jamie Jarvis	1,227	35.8	N/A
Labour	Bill Dale	1,209		
BNP	James Webb	1,208		
Conservative	Kenneth Coombs	370	10.8	−12.5
Liberal Democrats	Fredrick Tindling	287	8.4	−13.1
UKIP	Leslie Parsons	272	7.9	N/A
Turnout		2,990	42.2	+19.8
Registered electors		7,089		
Labour hold		Swing		
Labour hold		Swing		
BNP gain from Labour		Swing		

=== Whalebone ===
Whalebone (3)
Party	Candidate	Votes	%	±%
Labour	John Denyer	1,304	56.1	+15.5
Labour	Marie West	1,208		
Labour	John White	1,159		
Conservative	Paul Taylor	1,021	43.9	+26.2
Conservative	Christine Naylor	1,014		
Turnout		2,530	26.2	±0
Registered electors		6,922		
Labour gain from Residents		Swing		
Labour gain from Residents		Swing		
Labour hold		Swing		

== By-elections between 2006 and 2010 ==
=== Chadwell Heath ===
Chadwell Heath by-election, 3 July 2008
Party	Candidate	Votes	%	±%
Conservative	Terry Justice	842	37.4	+7.5
Labour	Margaret Mullane	691	30.7	−7.0
BNP	James Webb	564	25.1	+25.1
UKIP	Kerry Smith	142	6.3	−6.9
Independent	Dorien Mcilroy	11	0.5	−18.7
Majority		151	6.7	N/A
Turnout			33.1	−3.1
Registered electors				
Conservative gain from Labour		Swing		

The by-election was called following the resignation of Cllr Sarah Baillie. It was the last time a non Labour councillor was elected until 2026, and it is the last time a Conservative was elected to Barking and Dagenham Council
