= River (Barking and Dagenham ward) =

Electoral ward in London, England

Coordinates: 51.525°N 0.154°E

- Former electoral ward for the Barking and Dagenham London Borough Council
- River ward boundaries from 2002 to 2022
- Borough: Barking and Dagenham
- County: Greater London
- Electorate: 7,335 (2018)

Former electoral ward
- Created: 1965
- Abolished: 2022
- Councillors: 1965–1978: 4; 1978–2002: 2; 2002–2022: 3
- Replaced by: Beam, Goresbrook, Village
- GSS code: E05000038 (2002–2022)

River was an electoral ward in the London Borough of Barking and Dagenham from 1965 to 2022. It returned four until 1978, two until 2002 and then three councillors to Barking and Dagenham London Borough Council. The boundaries of the ward were revised in 1978 and 2002.

== 2002–2022 Barking and Dagenham council elections ==
There was a revision of ward boundaries in Barking and Dagenham in 2002.

=== 2018 election ===
The election took place on 3 May 2018.

2018 Barking and Dagenham London Borough Council election: River (3)
Party	Candidate	Votes	%	±%
Labour	Eileen Keller	1,525	26.8	−0.9
Labour	Peter Chand	1,513	26.6	−1.1
Labour	Donna Lumsden	1,431	25.2	N/A
Conservative	Robert Baillie	429	7.5	N/A
Conservative	Richard Burleton	420	7.4	N/A
Conservative	Ada Echedom	366	6.4	N/A
Turnout		2,068	28.2	−7.5
Registered electors		7,335		
Labour hold		Swing		
Labour hold		Swing		
Labour hold		Swing		

=== 2014 election ===
The election took place on 22 May 2014.

2014 Barking and Dagenham London Borough Council election: River (3)
Party	Candidate	Votes	%	±%
Labour	Peter Chand	1,668	27.7	N/A
Labour	Eileen Keller	1,668	27.7	N/A
Labour	Amardeep Singh Jamu	1,491	24.8	N/A
UKIP	Lorraine Harris	875	14.5	N/A
Conservative	Husneara Majid	317	5.3	N/A
Turnout		2,622	35.7	−25.4
Registered electors		7,339		
Labour hold		Swing		
Labour hold		Swing		
Labour hold		Swing		

=== 2010 election ===
The election on 6 May 2010 took place on the same day as the United Kingdom general election.

2010 Barking and Dagenham London Borough Council election: River (3)
Party	Candidate	Votes	%	±%
Labour	Liam Anthony Smith	2,406	48.4	−2.5
Labour	Eileen Sandra Keller	2,308		
Labour	Inder Singh Jamu	2,284		
BNP	Scott Jones	933	18.8	N/A
BNP	Victoria Jane Pengelly	853		
Conservative	Jean Margaret Cockling	576	11.6	−8.9
UKIP	Nobby Manning	505	10.2	−18.4
Conservative	Ronald Cole Bairstow	493		
Conservative	Chris Nwokebuife	404		
Liberal Democrats	Martha Nosa Ogbonmwan	367	7.4	N/A
Christian	Arinola Araba	183	3.7	N/A
Turnout		4,265	61.2	+25.5
Registered electors		6,971		
Labour hold		Swing		
Labour hold		Swing		
Labour hold		Swing		

=== 2006 election ===
The election took place on 4 May 2006.

2006 Barking and Dagenham London Borough Council election: River (3)
Party	Candidate	Votes	%	±%
Labour	Liam Smith	1,529	50.9	−18.5
Labour	Patricia Twomey	1,406		
Labour	Inder Jamu	1,304		
UKIP	Betty Parsons	858	28.6	N/A
Conservative	Herbert White	617	20.5	N/A
Turnout		2,649	35.7	+15.3
Registered electors		7,419		
Labour hold		Swing		
Labour hold		Swing		
Labour hold		Swing		

=== 2002 election ===
The election took place on 2 May 2002.

2002 Barking and Dagenham London Borough Council election: River (3)
Party	Candidate	Votes	%	±%
Labour	Liam Smith	1,018	69.4	−6.5
Labour	Patricia Twomey	987		
Labour	Inder Jamu	827		
Liberal Democrats	Rosemary McCulloch	449	30.6	+6.5
Turnout		1,462	20.4	−0.3
Registered electors		7,160		
Labour win (new boundaries)				
Labour win (new boundaries)				
Labour win (new boundaries)				

== 1978–2002 Barking and Dagenham council elections ==
There was a revision of ward boundaries in Barking in 1978. The name of the borough and council changed from Barking to Barking and Dagenham on 1 January 1980.

=== 1998 election ===
The election took place on 7 May 1998.

1998 Barking and Dagenham London Borough Council election: River (2)
Party	Candidate	Votes	%	±%
Labour	Patricia Twomey	768	75.9	−2.4
Labour	Inder Jamu	597		
Liberal Democrats	Hayley Downs	244	24.1	+2.4
Turnout		985	20.7	−12.9
Registered electors		4,754		
Labour hold		Swing		
Labour hold		Swing		

=== 1994 election ===
The election took place on 5 May 1994.

1994 Barking and Dagenham London Borough Council election: River (2)
Party	Candidate	Votes	%	±%
Labour	Patricia A. Twomey	1,200	78.3	−2.2
Labour	Inder S. Jamu	1,064		
Liberal Democrats	Robert R. Mansfield	332	21.7	N/A
Liberal Democrats	Leonard G. McGuinness	239		
Turnout		1,624	33.6	+1.1
Registered electors		4,828		
Labour hold		Swing		
Labour hold		Swing		

=== 1990 election ===
The election took place on 3 May 1990.

1990 Barking and Dagenham London Borough Council election: River (2)
Party	Candidate	Votes	%	±%
Labour	John P. Wainwright	1,224	80.5	+37.2
Labour	Inder S. Jamu	1,103		
Conservative	John C. Dutton	296	19.5	+7.4
Conservative	Peter J. Dutton	273		
Turnout		1,621	32.5	+1.1
Registered electors		4,885		
Labour hold		Swing		
Labour gain from Independent Resident				

=== 1988 by-election ===
A by-election took place on 3 November 1988, following the resignation of Patricia Twomey.

River by-election, 3 November 1988
Party	Candidate	Votes	%	±%
Labour	Inder S. Jamu	542	49.2	+5.9
Conservative	Marcus G. S. Needham	294	26.7	+14.6
Liberal Democrats	Susan J. Bertram	266	24.1	+11.7
Majority		248	22.5	N/A
Turnout			21.7	−9.7
Registered electors		5,073		
Labour hold		Swing		

=== 1986 election ===
The election took place on 8 May 1986.

1986 Barking and Dagenham London Borough Council election: River (2)
Party	Candidate	Votes	%	±%
Labour	John P. Wainwright	859	43.3	+1.2
Ind. Residents	Patricia A. Twomey	640	32.2	−7.0
Labour	Inder S. Jamu	621		
Alliance	Jean Key	247	12.4	N/A
Conservative	John M. Kinnie	240	12.1	−6.6
Turnout			31.4	−1.8
Registered electors		5,155		
Labour hold		Swing		
Ind. Residents hold		Swing		

=== 1982 election ===
The election took place on 6 May 1982.

1982 Barking and Dagenham London Borough Council election: River (2)
Party	Candidate	Votes	%	±%
Labour	John P. Wainwright	741	42.1	−24.9
Independent	Patricia A. Twomey	689	39.2	N/A
Independent	John C. Howard	636		
Labour	Inder S. Jamu	569		
Conservative	Mary F. Hawkins	329	18.7	−10.3
Turnout			33.2	+3.4
Registered electors		5,164		
Labour hold		Swing		
Independent gain from Labour		Swing		

=== 1978 election ===
The election took place on 4 May 1978.

1978 Barking London Borough Council election: River (2)
Party	Candidate	Votes	%	±%
Labour	Leonard J. Bryant	990	67.0	−13.9
Labour	James Morton	892		N/A
Conservative	Jane I Calver	429	29.0	+16.4
Conservative	William J. Whiter	376		N/A
Communist	Brian F. Nicholls	58	3.9	−2.6
Turnout			29.8	+10.4
Registered electors		5,243		
Labour win (new boundaries)				
Labour win (new boundaries)				

== 1964–1978 Barking council elections ==
=== 1974 election ===
The election took place on 2 May 1974.

1974 Barking London Borough Council election: River (4)
Party	Candidate	Votes	%	±%
Labour	J Morton	1,516	80.9	−1.3
Labour	P Bradley	1,508		N/A
Labour	E Bradley	1,504		N/A
Labour	E White	1,380		N/A
Conservative	V Nainby	236	12.6	±0.0
Conservative	J Patterson	208		N/A
Communist	G Wake	122	6.5	+1.2
Turnout			19.4	−5.4
Registered electors		8,322		
Labour hold		Swing		
Labour hold		Swing		
Labour hold		Swing		
Labour hold		Swing		

=== 1972 by-election ===
A by-election took place on 4 May 1972.

River by-election, 4 May 1972 (2)
Party	Candidate	Votes	%	±%
Labour	R. Blackburn	1,263		N/A
Labour	E. J. White	1,226		N/A
Conservative	Mrs. A. E. Horrell	209		N/A
Conservative	T. A. Woodcock	201		N/A
Majority		N/A	N/A	N/A
Turnout			17.4	N/A
Registered electors		8,589		
Labour hold		Swing		
Labour hold		Swing		

=== 1971 election ===
The election took place on 13 May 1971.

1971 Barking London Borough Council election: River (4)
Party	Candidate	Votes	%	±%
Labour	D Dodd	1,908	82.1	+30.4
Labour	D Linehan	1,895		N/A
Labour	E Bradley	1,863		N/A
Labour	L Thompson	1,814		N/A
Conservative	E Brown	292	12.6	+18.4
Conservative	A Horrell	251		N/A
Conservative	F Read	229		N/A
Conservative	M Whiter	226		N/A
Communist	G Wake	124	5.3	N/A
Turnout			24.8	+5.9
Registered electors		8,665		
Labour hold		Swing		
Labour hold		Swing		
Labour hold		Swing		
Labour hold		Swing		

=== 1968 election ===
The election took place on 9 May 1968.

1968 Barking London Borough Council election: River (4)
Party	Candidate	Votes	%	±%
Labour	D Dodd	856	51.7	−21.9
Labour	D Linehan	769		N/A
Labour	E Kitchen	751		N/A
Labour	F Spraggins	730		N/A
Conservative	T Fitzpatrick	641	38.7	+31.0
Conservative	J Anker	633		N/A
Conservative	M Whiter	602		N/A
Conservative	W Whiter	574		N/A
Communist	W Pocock	160	9.7	−6.2
Turnout		-6.6	18.9	−6.6
Registered electors		8,556		
Labour hold		Swing		
Labour hold		Swing		
Labour hold		Swing		
Labour hold		Swing		

=== 1964 election ===
The election took place on 7 May 1964.

1964 Barking London Borough Council election: River (4)
Party	Candidate	Votes	%	±%
Labour	D. A. Dodd	1,722	73.6	N/A
Labour	D. O'Dwyer	1,678		N/A
Labour	Daniel Linehan	1,643		N/A
Labour	David Linehan	1,620		N/A
Liberal	Miss H. Cadman	353	15.1	N/A
Liberal	Miss A. Burlinson	281		N/A
Liberal	J. R. Pritchard	272		N/A
Liberal	H. H. Sharman	268		N/A
Conservative	Mrs. A. Sabourin	181	7.7	N/A
Conservative	Mrs. E. M. Bloomfield	178		N/A
Conservative	Mrs. M. Whiter	177		N/A
Conservative	W. J. Whiter	167		N/A
Communist	A. F. Ott	83	3.5	N/A
Turnout		2,303	25.5	N/A
Registered electors		9,035		
Labour win (new seat)				
Labour win (new seat)				
Labour win (new seat)				
Labour win (new seat)				
