= Eastbrook (ward) =

Electoral ward in London, England

- Former electoral ward for the Barking and Dagenham London Borough Council
- Eastbrook ward boundaries from 2002 to 2022
- Borough: Barking and Dagenham
- County: Greater London

Former electoral ward
- Created: 1965
- Abolished: 2022
- GSS code: E05000030

Eastbrook was an electoral ward in the London Borough of Barking and Dagenham from 1965 to 2022.

== 2002–2022 Barking and Dagenham council elections ==
There was a revision of ward boundaries in Barking and Dagenham in 2002.

=== 2018 election ===
The election took place on 3 May 2018.

2018 Barking and Dagenham London Borough Council election: Eastbrook
Party	Candidate	Votes	%	±%
Labour	Michael Anthony McCarthy	1,586	21.3	−0.4
Labour	Princess Bright	1,418	19.0	N/A
Labour	Tony Ramsay	1,391	18.6	+0.5
Conservative	Sue Connelly	938	12.6	+5.1
Conservative	Peter Harris	868	11.6	N/A
Conservative	Dewan Chowdhury Mahdi	728	9.8	N/A
Independent	Ron Emin	372	5.0	N/A
BNP	Tony McKay	158	2.1	N/A
Turnout		2,704	33.4	−3.1
Registered electors		8,084		
Labour hold		Swing		
Labour hold		Swing		
Labour hold		Swing		

=== 2014 election ===
The election took place on 22 May 2014.

2014 Barking and Dagenham London Borough Council election: Eastbrook
Party	Candidate	Votes	%	±%
Labour	Michael McCarthy	1,581	21.7	N/A
Labour	Edna Fergus	1,397	19.1	N/A
Labour	Anthony Ramsay	1,326	18.8	N/A
UKIP	Richard Kelly	1,102	15.1	N/A
UKIP	Jonathan Gay	960	13.1	N/A
Conservative	Susan Connelly	544	7.5	N/A
BNP	Anthony McKay	222	3.0	N/A
BNP	Paul Sturdy	166	2.3	N/A
Turnout		2,833	36.5	−26.5
Registered electors		7,757		
Labour hold		Swing		
Labour hold		Swing		
Labour hold		Swing		

=== 2010 election ===
The election on 6 May 2010 took place on the same day as the United Kingdom general election.

2010 Barking and Dagenham London Borough Council election: Eastbrook
Party	Candidate	Votes	%	±%
Labour	Mick McCarthy	2,295	44.1	−6.2
Labour	Pam Burgon	2,026		
Labour	Tony Ramsay	1,854		
Conservative	Neil Stuart Connelly	1,232	23.7	−26.0
Conservative	Sue Connelly	1,201		
Conservative	Daniel Jonathon Sunley-Smith	1,066		
BNP	Tony Knight	903	17.5	N/A
BNP	Christine Anne Knight	900		
BNP	John David Lillywhite	794		
Liberal Democrats	Oluwole Alabi Taiwo	392	7.5	N/A
UKIP	Leslie Richard Chapman	378	7.3	N/A
Turnout		4,706	63.0	+8.9
Registered electors		7,466		
Labour hold		Swing		
Labour gain from Conservative		Swing		
Labour hold		Swing		

=== 2006 election ===
The election took place on 4 May 2006.

2006 Barking and Dagenham London Borough Council election: Eastbrook
Party	Candidate	Votes	%	±%
Labour	Mick McCarthy	1,151	50.3	−1.5
Conservative	Neil Connelly	1,139	49.7	+12.3
Labour	Bob Little	1,126		
Conservative	Sue Connelly	1,101		
Conservative	Susan Smith	1,067		
Labour	Margaret Mullane	1,036		
Turnout		4,070	54.1	+28.5
Registered electors		7,523		
Labour hold		Swing		
Conservative gain from Labour		Swing		
Labour hold		Swing		

=== 2002 election ===
The election took place on 2 May 2002.

2002 Barking and Dagenham London Borough Council election: Eastbrook
Party	Candidate	Votes	%	±%
Labour	Lawrence Bunn	1,003	51.8	−21.8
Labour	Leonard Collins	936		
Labour	Sidney Summerfield	893		
Conservative	Sue Connolly	725	37.4	N/A
Conservative	Kerry Smith	717		
Conservative	Vivian Patten	677		
Independent	Mike Butler	210	10.8	N/A
Turnout		1,897	25.6	+0.5
Registered electors		7,419		
Labour win (new boundaries)				
Labour win (new boundaries)				
Labour win (new boundaries)				

== 1978–2002 Barking and Dagenham council elections ==
There was a revision of ward boundaries in Barking in 1978. The name of the borough and council changed from Barking to Barking and Dagenham on 1 January 1980.

=== 1998 election ===
The election took place on 7 May 1998.

1998 Barking and Dagenham London Borough Council election: Eastbrook
Party	Candidate	Votes	%	±%
Labour	Lawrence Bunn	1,238	73.6	−8.5
Labour	Leonard A. Collins	1,089		
Labour	Sidney Summerfield	1,077		
Liberal Democrats	Graham E. Churchman	444	26.4	−8.5
Turnout		1,646	25.1	−10.0
Registered electors		6,551		
Labour hold		Swing		
Labour hold		Swing		
Labour hold		Swing		

=== 1994 election ===
The election took place on 5 May 1994.

1994 Barking and Dagenham London Borough Council election: Eastbrook
Party	Candidate	Votes	%	±%
Labour	Richard Blackburn	1,788	82.1	+2.8
Labour	Frederick Tibble	1,739		
Labour	Lawrence Bunn	1,682		
Liberal Democrats	Angela Lambart	390	17.9	N/A
Liberal Democrats	Donna Lewis	328		
Liberal Democrats	Jacqueline Williams	317		
Turnout		2,399	35.1	−0.5
Registered electors		6,837		
Labour hold		Swing		
Labour hold		Swing		
Labour hold		Swing		

=== 1990 election ===
The election took place on 3 May 1990.

1990 Barking and Dagenham London Borough Council election: Eastbrook
Party	Candidate	Votes	%	±%
Labour	Richard Blackburn*	1,860	80.1	+21.2
Labour	Frederick Tibble*	1,804		
Labour	Lawrence Bunn*	1,758		
Conservative	Malcolm Beatty	485	19.9	+2.6
Conservative	Reginald Williams	436		
Conservative	Charles McGinley	428		
Rejected ballots		4	0.2	N/A
Turnout		2,478	35.6	+3.0
Registered electors		6,963		
Labour hold		Swing		
Labour hold		Swing		
Labour hold		Swing		

=== 1986 election ===
The election took place on 8 May 1986.

1986 Barking and Dagenham London Borough Council election: Eastbrook
Party	Candidate	Votes	%	±%
Labour	Richard Blackburn	1,347	58.9	+18.5
Labour	Frederick Tibble	1,314		
Labour	Lawrence Bunn	1,232		
Conservative	Royston Oliver	514	22.5	−12.8
Conservative	Kenneth Coombs	513		
Conservative	William Preston	450		
Alliance	David Kingaby	424	18.6	−5.7
Turnout			32.6	−1.2
Registered electors		7,196		
Labour hold		Swing		
Labour hold		Swing		
Labour hold		Swing		

=== 1982 election ===
The election took place on 6 May 1982.

1982 Barking and Dagenham London Borough Council election: Eastbrook
Party	Candidate	Votes	%	±%
Labour	Frederick Tibble	895	40.4	−7.8
Labour	Lawrence Bunn	845		
Labour	Alan Stevens	815		
Conservative	Norman Houlder	782	35.3	−8.8
Conservative	Sydney Horrell	767		
Conservative	Ada Horrell	758		
Alliance	George Keegan	539	24.3	+16.6
Alliance	Edward Bullock	530		
Alliance	Joan Keegan	528		
Turnout			33.8	−3.3
Registered electors		7,174		
Labour hold		Swing		
Labour hold		Swing		
Labour hold		Swing		

=== 1978 election ===
The election took place on 4 May 1978.

1978 Barking London Borough Council election: Eastbrook
Party	Candidate	Votes	%	±%
Labour	Frederick Tibble	1,202	48.2	−32.1
Labour	Leonard Collins	1,197		N/A
Labour	George Crouch	1,176		N/A
Conservative	Alexander Owen	1,099	44.1	+30.9
Conservative	Sydney Horrell	1.094		N/A
Conservative	Ada Horrell	1.089		N/A
Liberal	Edward Bullock	192	7.7	N/A
Turnout			37.1	+17.8
Registered electors		7,364		
Labour hold		Swing		
Labour hold		Swing		
Labour hold		Swing		

== 1964–1978 Barking council elections ==
=== 1974 election ===
The election took place on 2 May 1974.

1974 Barking London Borough Council election: Eastbrook
Party	Candidate	Votes	%	±%
Labour	Frederick Tibble	1,824	80.3	−5.3
Labour	Leonard Collins	1,812		N/A
Labour	Arthur Biles	1,791		N/A
Labour	J Lawrence	1,772		N/A
Conservative	Reginald Johnson	301	13.2	+5.7
Conservative	William Maule	222		N/A
Communist	J Carter	147	6.5	−0.5
Turnout			19.3	−6.6
Registered electors		10,177		
Labour hold		Swing		
Labour hold		Swing		
Labour hold		Swing		
Labour hold		Swing		

=== 1971 election ===
The election took place on 13 May 1971.

1971 Barking London Borough Council election: Eastbrook
Party	Candidate	Votes	%	±%
Labour	Leonard Collins	2,663	85.6	+32.4
Labour	Frederick Tibble	2,648		N/A
Labour	F Coomber	2,583		N/A
Labour	J Morton	2,550		N/A
Conservative	W Whiter	232	7.5	−20.0
Communist	C Baker	217	7.0	−0.1
Turnout			25.9	+3.9
Registered electors		10,498		
Labour hold		Swing		
Labour hold		Swing		
Labour hold		Swing		
Labour hold		Swing		

=== 1968 election ===
The election took place on 9 May 1968.

1968 Barking London Borough Council election: Eastbrook
Party	Candidate	Votes	%	±%
Labour	Frederick Tibble	1,166	53.2	−13.9
Labour	Leonard Collins	1,157		N/A
Labour	Jack Thomas	1,122		N/A
Labour	J Lawrence	1,082		N/A
Conservative	R Johnson	602	27.5	+20.3
Conservative	A Middleton	569		N/A
Conservative	A Sabourin	554		N/A
Conservative	P Wilkins	537		N/A
Liberal	H Cooper	268	12.2	−9.5
Liberal	Y Dodman	231		N/A
Liberal	G Andrews	224		N/A
Communist	C King	156	7.1	+3.1
Turnout			22.0	−7.1
Registered electors		9,751		
Labour hold		Swing		
Labour hold		Swing		
Labour hold		Swing		
Labour hold		Swing		

=== 1964 election ===
The election took place on 7 May 1964.

1964 Barking London Borough Council election: Eastbrook
Party	Candidate	Votes	%	±%
Labour	G Crouch	1,975	67.1	N/A
Labour	J Hollidge	1,959		N/A
Labour	Frederick Tibble	1,903		N/A
Labour	J Thomas	1,873		N/A
Liberal	G Keegan	637	21.7	N/A
Liberal	G Atkin	619		N/A
Liberal	L Brendon	602		N/A
Liberal	A Newbury	577		N/A
Conservative	R Johnson	211	7.2	N/A
Conservative	A Middleton	199		N/A
Conservative	J Calver	198		N/A
Conservative	J Bradford	195		N/A
Communist	M Edwards	119	4.0	N/A
Communist	C King	64		N/A
Turnout		2,905	29.1	N/A
Registered electors		9,991		
Labour win (new seat)				
Labour win (new seat)				
Labour win (new seat)				
Labour win (new seat)				
