= Goresbrook (ward) =

Electoral ward in the London Borough of Barking and Dagenham

Coordinates: 51.537°N 0.1414°E

- Electoral ward for the Barking and Dagenham London Borough Council
- Goresbrook ward boundaries since 2022
- Borough: Barking and Dagenham
- County: Greater London
- Population: 13,070 (2021) (Note: 2021 Census data reported for 2022 ward boundaries)
- Electorate: 8,858 (2022)
- Area: 1.389 square kilometres (0.536 sq mi)

Current electoral ward
- Created: 1978
- Number of members: 3
- Councillors: George Miller; Caleb Van Ryneveld; Manjeet Nandra
- GSS code: E05000033 (2002–2022); E05014062 (2022–present)

Goresbrook is an electoral ward in the London Borough of Barking and Dagenham.

== Barking and Dagenham council elections since 2022 ==
There was a revision of ward boundaries in Barking and Dagenham in 2022.

=== 2026 election ===
The election took place on 7 May 2026.

2026 Barking and Dagenham London Borough Council election: Goresbrook
Party	Candidate	Votes	%	±%
Reform	George Miller	1,309	42.0	N/A
Reform	Caleb Van Ryneveld	1,170	37.6	N/A
Reform	Manjeet Nandra	1,149	36.9	N/A
Labour	Irma Freeborn	874	28.1	−34.3
Labour	Paul Robinson	818	26.3	−39.1
Labour	Nassaba Guiba	772	24.8	N/A
Green	Sheikh Ahmed	664	21.3	N/A
Green	Poly Ara	560	18.0	N/A
Conservative	Colin Bowman	444	14.3	N/A
Conservative	Mohammed Islam	370	11.9	N/A
Conservative	Sharfaraz Raj	330	10.6	−16.5
Liberal Democrats	Muhammad Awan	170	5.5	N/A
Turnout		3,114	35.1	+10.4
Registered electors		8,859		
Reform gain from Labour		Swing		
Reform gain from Labour		Swing		
Reform gain from Labour		Swing		

=== 2022 election ===
The election took place on 5 May 2022.

2022 Barking and Dagenham London Borough Council election: Goresbrook
Party	Candidate	Votes	%	±%
Labour	Paul Robinson	1,292	27.7	N/A
Labour	Irma Freeborn	1,233	26.4	N/A
Labour	Moin Quadri	1,119	24.0	N/A
Conservative	Sharfaraz Raj	535	11.5	N/A
Conservative	Mehreen Zahid Iqbal	489	10.5	N/A
Turnout		1,977	22.0	N/A
Registered electors		8,858		
Labour win (new boundaries)				
Labour win (new boundaries)				
Labour win (new boundaries)				

== 2002–2022 Barking and Dagenham council elections ==
Goresbrook ward boundaries from 2002 to 2022

There was a revision of ward boundaries in Barking and Dagenham in 2002. Councillors representing Goresbrook increased from two to three.

=== 2018 election ===
The election took place on 3 May 2018.

2018 Barking and Dagenham London Borough Council election: Goresbrook
Party	Candidate	Votes	%	±%
Labour	Simon Bremner	1,450	25.9	+2.7
Labour	Irma Freeborn	1,346	24.0	+1.6
Labour	Moin Quadri	1,250	22.3	+2.6
Conservative	Paul Williams	586	10.5	N/A
Conservative	Md Abu Noman	361	6.4	N/A
Conservative	Nadia Yasin	358	6.4	N/A
BNP	Bede Smith	246	4.4	−8.0
Turnout		2,128	26.4	−8.3
Registered electors		8,047		
Labour hold		Swing		
Labour hold		Swing		
Labour hold		Swing		

=== 2014 election ===
The election took place on 22 May 2014.

2014 Barking and Dagenham London Borough Council election: Goresbrook
Party	Candidate	Votes	%	±%
Labour	Simon Bremner	1,518	23.2	N/A
Labour	Irma Freeborn	1,471	22.4	N/A
Labour	Moin Quadri	1,290	19.7	N/A
UKIP	Alan Kiff	1,023	15.6	N/A
BNP	Robert Taylor	469	7.2	N/A
Conservative	Nadia Khatun	236	3.6	N/A
Conservative	Sultana Hussain	224	3.4	N/A
Conservative	Pearle Onochie	189	2.9	N/A
Liberal Democrats	Nzingha Shukura	131	2.0	N/A
Turnout		2,713	34.7	23.0
Registered electors		7,812		
Labour hold		Swing		
Labour hold		Swing		
Labour hold		Swing		

=== 2010 election ===
The election on 6 May 2010 took place on the same day as the United Kingdom general election.

2010 Barking and Dagenham London Borough Council election: Goresbrook
Party	Candidate	Votes	%	±%
Labour	Graham Letchford	2,142	43.6	+8.0
Labour	Louise Couling	1,963		
Labour	Jim Clee	1,872		
BNP	Richard Barnbrook	1,340	27.2	−15.2
BNP	Eddy Butler	1,146		
BNP	Shell Brunt	1,128		
Conservative	George Naylor	644	13.1	+2.1
Conservative	Christopher Newton	533		
Liberal Democrats	Felicia Taiwo	457	9.3	N/A
Liberal Democrats	Nzingha Shukura	432		
Independent	Warren Northover	335	6.8	N/A
Turnout		4,323	57.8	+16.4
Registered electors		7,482		
Labour gain from BNP		Swing		
Labour gain from BNP		Swing		
Labour hold		Swing		

=== 2006 election ===
The election took place on 4 May 2006.

2006 Barking and Dagenham London Borough Council election: Goresbrook
Party	Candidate	Votes	%	±%
BNP	Richard Barnbrook	1,434	42.4	N/A
BNP	Tracy Lansdown	1,357		
Labour	Warren Northover	1,204	35.6	−36.4
Labour	Edna Fergus	1,162		
Labour	Jeffrey Porter	1,135		
Conservative	George Naylor	373	11.0	N/A
UKIP	Terence Jones	367	10.9	N/A
Turnout		3,021	41.4	+21.1
Registered electors		7,298		
BNP gain from Labour		Swing		
BNP gain from Labour		Swing		
Labour hold		Swing		

=== 2005 by-election ===
The by-election took place on 23 July 2005, following the resignation of Daniel Kelly.

2005 Goresbrook by-election
Party	Candidate	Votes	%	±%
Labour	Warren Northover	1,227	51.0	+22.0
BNP	Lawrence Rustem	791	32.9	−19.0
UKIP	Kerry Smith	216	9.0	+2.4
Conservative	Christine Naylor	167	7.0	+1.6
Majority		436	17.1	N/A
Turnout			33.6	+13.3
Registered electors				
Labour gain from BNP		Swing		

=== 2004 by-election ===
The by-election took place on 16 September 2004, following the resignation of Matthew Huggins.

2004 Goresbrook by-election
Party	Candidate	Votes	%	±%
BNP	Daniel Kelly	1,072	51.9	N/A
Labour	Patricia Northover	602	29.1	−32.9
UKIP	Terence Jones	137	6.6	N/A
Conservative	Christine Naylor	111	5.4	N/A
Liberal Democrats	Frederick Tindling	85	4.1	−33.9
Green	Geoff Sheridan	59	2.9	N/A
Majority		470	22.8	N/A
Turnout			28.8	+8.5
Registered electors				
BNP gain from Labour		Swing		

=== 2002 election ===
The election took place on 2 May 2002.

2002 Barking and Dagenham London Borough Council election: Goresbrook
Party	Candidate	Votes	%	±%
Labour	Jeff Porter	847	62.0	−4.1
Labour	Matthew Huggins	842		
Labour	Alan Thomas	778		
Liberal Democrats	Kelly Gill	520	38.0	+4.1
Liberal Democrats	William Gill	509		
Turnout		1,443	20.3	−4.2
Registered electors		7,107		
Labour win (new boundaries)				
Labour win (new boundaries)				
Labour win (new boundaries)				

== 1978–2002 Barking and Dagenham council elections ==
The name of the borough and council changed from Barking to Barking and Dagenham on 1 January 1980.

=== 1998 election ===
The election took place on 7 May 1998.

1998 Barking and Dagenham London Borough Council election: Goresbrook
Party	Candidate	Votes	%	±%
Labour	Terence Power	805	66.1	−17.7
Labour	Alan Thomas	723		
Liberal Democrats	Liam Smith	413	33.9	+17.7
Liberal Democrats	Peter Downs	344		
Turnout		1,291	24.5	+13.8
Registered electors		5,265		
Labour hold		Swing		
Labour hold		Swing		

=== 1994 election ===
The election took place on 5 May 1994.

1994 Barking and Dagenham London Borough Council election: Goresbrook
Party	Candidate	Votes	%	±%
Labour	Terence Power	1,608	83.8	+5.5
Labour	Alan Thomas	1,566		
Liberal Democrats	Peter Downs	310	16.2	+5.9
Liberal Democrats	Hayley Downs	306		
Turnout		2,057	38.3	+0.5
Registered electors		5,364		
Labour hold		Swing		
Labour hold		Swing		

=== 1990 election ===
The election took place on 3 May 1990.

1990 Barking and Dagenham London Borough Council election: Goresbrook
Party	Candidate	Votes	%	
Labour	Alan Thomas	1,546	78.03	
Labour	Terence Power	1,507		
Conservative	Ivy Blanchard	226	11.55	
Liberal Democrats	Roger Sparrow	204	10.42	
Registered electors		4,950		
Turnout		1,869	37.76	
Rejected ballots		0	0.0	N/A
Labour hold				
Labour hold				

=== 1986 election ===
The election took place on 8 May 1986.

1986 Barking and Dagenham London Borough Council election: Goresbrook
Party	Candidate	Votes	%	±%
Labour	Alan Thomas	1,295	77.5	+13.3
Labour	Peter Robinson	1,235		
Alliance	Catherine Gavin	281	16.8	N/A
National Front	Jeannie Pearce	94	5.6	+1.1
National Front	Stephen Woodward	72		
Turnout			33.3	+5.1
Registered electors		5,018		
Labour hold		Swing		
Labour hold		Swing		

=== 1982 election ===
The election took place on 6 May 1982.

1982 Barking and Dagenham London Borough Council election: Goresbrook
Party	Candidate	Votes	%	±%
Labour	David Dodd	856	64.2	−2.2
Labour	Edith Bradley	852		
Conservative	Frank Allen	417	31.3	−2.6
Conservative	John Dutton	367		
National Front	Ronald Ferrett	60	4.5	N/A
National Front	Stephen Woodward	57		
Turnout			28.2	+2.4
Registered electors		5,099		
Labour hold		Swing		
Labour hold		Swing		

=== 1978 election ===
The election took place on 4 May 1978.

1978 Barking London Borough Council election: Goresbrook
Party	Candidate	Votes	%	±%
Labour	David Dodd	1,018	66.4	N/A
Labour	Edith Bradley	997		N/A
Conservative	Victor Reeves	440	28.7	N/A
Communist	Avis Greenway	76	5.0	N/A
Turnout			30.6	N/A
Registered electors		5,230		
Labour win (new seat)				
Labour win (new seat)				
