= Fanshawe (ward) =

Electoral ward in London, England

- Former electoral ward for the Barking and Dagenham London Borough Council
- Borough: Barking and Dagenham
- County: Greater London

Former electoral ward
- Created: 1965
- Abolished: 2002

Fanshawe was an electoral ward in the London Borough of Barking and Dagenham from 1965 to 2002.

== 1978–2002 Barking and Dagenham council elections ==
There was a revision of ward boundaries in Barking in 1978. The name of the borough and council changed from Barking to Barking and Dagenham on 1 January 1980.

=== 1998 election ===
The election took place on 7 May 1998.

1998 Barking and Dagenham London Borough Council election: Fanshawe
Party	Candidate	Votes	%	±%
Labour	Frederick Jones	1,092	73.7	−9.2
Labour	Herbert Collins	1,065		
Labour	Raymond Parkin	927		
Liberal Democrats	Winifred Chapman	390	26.3	+9.2
Turnout		1,521	24.7	−12.1
Registered electors		6,153		
Labour hold		Swing		
Labour hold		Swing		
Labour hold		Swing		

=== 1994 election ===
The election took place on 5 May 1994.

1994 Barking and Dagenham London Borough Council election: Fanshawe
Party	Candidate	Votes	%	±%
Labour	Frederick Jones	1,788	82.43	▼2.95
Labour	Raymond Parkin	1,696		
Labour	John Thomas	1,569		
Liberal Democrats	Margaret Deller	368	17.57	New
Liberal Democrats	Timothy Williams	350		
Registered electors		6,367		▼253
Turnout		2,383	37.43	▲1.48
Rejected ballots		9	0.38	▼0.08
Labour hold				
Labour hold				
Labour hold				

=== 1990 election ===
The election took place on 3 May 1990.

1990 Barking and Dagenham London Borough Council election: Fanshawe
Party	Candidate	Votes	%	±%
Labour	Frederick Jones	1,956	85.38	
Labour	Raymond Parkin	1,827		
Labour	John Thomas	1,799		
Conservative	Robert Brownless	277	11.59	
Conservative	Edward Holt	256		
Conservative	William Whiter	225		
Communist	Alfred Ott	66	3.03	
Registered electors		6,620		
Turnout		2,380	35.95	
Rejected ballots		11	0.46	
Labour hold		Swing		
Labour hold		Swing		
Labour hold		Swing		

=== 1988 by-election ===
The by-election took place on 10 March 1988, following the death of Ernest Turner.

1988 Fanshawe by-election
Party	Candidate	Votes	%	±%
Labour	Raymond Parkin	910	77.3	+6.3
Conservative	William Preston	247	21.0	+21.0
Communist	Alfred Ott	20	1.7	−2.9
Majority		663	56.3	N/A
Turnout			17.7	−11.6
Registered electors		6,666		
Labour hold		Swing		

=== 1986 election ===
The election took place on 8 May 1986.

1986 Barking and Dagenham London Borough Council election: Fanshawe
Party	Candidate	Votes	%	±%
Labour	Frederick Jones	1,498	71.0	−19.8
Labour	John Thomas	1,326		
Labour	Ernest Turner	1,287		
Alliance	Susan Watson	514	24.4	N/A
Communist	Jeffrey Porter	97	4.6	−4.6
Turnout			29.3	+5.0
Registered electors		6,811		
Labour hold		Swing		
Labour hold		Swing		
Labour hold		Swing		

=== 1982 election ===
The election took place on 6 May 1982.

1982 Barking and Dagenham London Borough Council election: Fanshawe
Party	Candidate	Votes	%	±%
Labour	Frederick Jones	1,272	90.8	+18.4
Labour	John Thomas	1,053		
Labour	Ernest Turner	1,042		
Communist	Keith Bird	129	9.2	+5.8
Turnout			24.3	−5.9
Registered electors		6,926		
Labour hold		Swing		
Labour hold		Swing		
Labour hold		Swing		

=== 1978 election ===
The election took place on 4 May 1978.

1978 Barking London Borough Council election: Fanshawe
Party	Candidate	Votes	%	±%
Labour	Frederick Jones	1,371	72.4	−8.9
Labour	John Thomas	1,244		N/A
Labour	Ernest Turner	1,221		N/A
Conservative	William Russell	459	24.2	+15.9
Conservative	Ronald Rands	428		N/A
Conservative	Alan Wiles	400		N/A
Communist	Keith Bird	64	3.4	−7.0
Turnout			30.2	+10.6
Registered electors		6,885		
Labour hold		Swing		
Labour hold		Swing		
Labour hold		Swing		

== 1964–1978 Barking council elections ==
External image
- Fanshawe ward boundaries from 1965 to 1978

=== 1974 election ===
The election took place on 2 May 1974.

1974 Barking London Borough Council election: Fanshawe
Party	Candidate	Votes	%	±%
Labour	Frederick Jones	1,823	81.3	−5.2
Labour	M Eales	1,736		N/A
Labour	B Walker	1,681		N/A
Labour	Ernest Turner	1,651		N/A
Communist	K Madden	233	10.4	+1.8
Conservative	M Whiter	187	8.3	+3.4
Conservative	W Whiter	168		N/A
Turnout			19.6	−10.0
Registered electors		9,553		
Labour hold		Swing		
Labour hold		Swing		
Labour hold		Swing		
Labour hold		Swing		

=== 1971 election ===
The election took place on 13 May 1971.

1971 Barking London Borough Council election: Fanshawe
Party	Candidate	Votes	%	±%
Labour	Frederick Jones	2,868	86.5	+23.1
Labour	J Blake	2,846		N/A
Labour	Ernest Turner	2,748		N/A
Labour	B Walker	2,666		N/A
Communist	K Madden	285	8.6	−6.8
Conservative	E Apps	163	4.9	−16.3
Turnout			29.6	+10.7
Registered electors		9,788		
Labour hold		Swing		
Labour hold		Swing		
Labour hold		Swing		
Labour hold		Swing		

=== 1968 election ===
The election took place on 9 May 1968.

1968 Barking London Borough Council election: Fanshawe
Party	Candidate	Votes	%	±%
Labour	M Warren	1,221	63.4	−7.0
Labour	Frederick Jones	1,214		N/A
Labour	J Fackerell	1,175		N/A
Labour	B Walker	1,174		N/A
Conservative	J Watts	408	21.2	−2.5
Communist	K Madden	296	15.4	+9.7
Turnout			18.9	−7.0
Registered electors		9,618		
Labour hold		Swing		
Labour hold		Swing		
Labour hold		Swing		
Labour hold		Swing		

=== 1964 election ===
The election took place on 7 May 1964.

1964 Barking London Borough Council election: Fanshawe
Party	Candidate	Votes	%	±%
Labour	F Brown	1,946	70.4	N/A
Labour	Frederick Jones	1,916		N/A
Labour	M Warren	1,908		N/A
Labour	W Milne	1,868		N/A
Liberal	R Muller	516	18.7	N/A
Liberal	J Goldner	349		N/A
Liberal	A Williams	306		N/A
Liberal	V Kettelty	300		N/A
Conservative	E Barrow	159	5.7	N/A
Communist	K Madden	145	5.2	N/A
Conservative	J Smith	133		N/A
Conservative	J Stonebank	133		N/A
Conservative	D Simms	118		N/A
Turnout		2,567	25.9	N/A
Registered electors		9,903		
Labour win (new seat)				
Labour win (new seat)				
Labour win (new seat)				
Labour win (new seat)				
