= 1998 Barking and Dagenham London Borough Council election =

1998 local election in England

1998 Barking and Dagenham Council election
- 7 May 1998

All 51 council seats to Barking and Dagenham London Borough Council 26 seats needed for a majority
- Registered: 112,374
- Turnout: 28,559, 25.41% (▼13.31)

	First party	Second party	Third party
Leader	Ray Parkin	Robert Jeyes	Stephen W. Churchman
Party	Labour	Residents	Liberal Democrats
Leader since	1998	1982	1994
Leader's seat	Fanshawe	Chadwell Heath	Eastbury
Last election	47 seats, 73.35%	3 seats, 3.91%	1 seats, 17.39%
Seats before	46	3	1
Seats won	47	3	1
Seat change	Steady	Steady	Steady
Popular vote	44,885	4,550	11,424
Percentage	72.40	7.34	18.42
Swing	▼0.95	▲3.43	▼1.03
Council control before election
Labour
Council control after election
Labour

The 1998 Barking and Dagenham London Borough Council election took place on 7 May 1998 to elect members of Barking and Dagenham London Borough Council in London, England. The whole council was up for election and the Labour Party stayed in overall control of the council.

== Background ==
In the years between this election and the last there were 2 by-elections to replace councillor who either resigned or died, however none of these elections resulted in the seats changing parties.

The election saw the Conservative Party only put up five candidates in the election, and they failed to win any seats on the council. The Labour leader of the council, George Brooker, stood down at the election after 51 years. He opposed the Greater London Authority referendum that took place at the same time as the election, however Barking and Dagenham saw 73.49% vote in favour and 26.51% against. Overall turnout in the election was 25.41%.

Shortly before the election a single Labour seat became vacant and there was not enough time to hold a by-election to replace them, meaning that the composition of the council just before the elections was as follows:

↓
46	1	3	1
Labour	Lib Dem	Resident	Vacant

== Election result ==
Barking and Dagenham local election result 1998
Party	Seats	Gains	Losses	Net gain/loss	Seats %	Votes %	Votes	+/−
Labour	47	0	0	Steady	92.16	72.40	44,885	▼0.95
Residents	3	0	0	Steady	5.88	7.34	4,550	▲3.43
Liberal Democrats	1	0	0	Steady	1.96	18.42	11,424	▼1.03
Conservative	0	0	0	Steady	0.00	1.84	1,140	▲2.06
Total	51						61,999	

After the election the composition of the council was as follows:

↓
47	1	3
Labour	Lib Dem	Resident

== Ward results ==
(*) - Indicates an incumbent candidate

(†) - Indicates an incumbent candidate standing in a different ward

=== Abbey ===
Abbey (3)
Party	Candidate	Votes	%	±%
Labour	Jeannette Alexander*	1,223	71.2	+9.9
Labour	Graham Bramley*	1,054		
Labour	Mohammed Fani*	976		
Liberal Democrats	Brian Beadle	495	28.8	+26.7
Liberal Democrats	Sheila Clay	453		
Liberal Democrats	Siobhan Jebb	349		
Turnout		1,901	27.3	+12.4
Registered electors		6,958		
Labour hold		Swing		
Labour hold		Swing		
Labour hold		Swing		

=== Alibon ===
Alibon (2)
Party	Candidate	Votes	%	±%
Labour	Terence Wade*	727	72.7	−11.7
Labour	Ernest White*	678		
Liberal Democrats	Catherine Kelly*	141	14.1	−1.5
Conservative	Malcolm Beatty	132	13.2	N/A
Turnout		996	24.5	−12.4
Registered electors		4,135		
Labour hold		Swing		
Labour hold		Swing		

=== Becontree ===
Becontree (2)
Party	Candidate	Votes	%	±%
Labour	Edith Bradley*	754	75.8	−5.4
Labour	John Wainwright*	610		
Liberal Democrats	Anthony Stepton	241	24.2	+5.6
Turnout		1,027	19.8	−14.1
Registered electors		5,190		
Labour hold		Swing		
Labour hold		Swing		

=== Cambell ===
Cambell (3)
Party	Candidate	Votes	%	±%
Labour	Joan Rawlinson*	1,074	78.8	+4.3
Labour	Jeffrey Porter	1,047		
Labour	June Van Roten*	1,041		
Liberal Democrats	Michael Mailey	289	21.2	+5.3
Liberal Democrats	John Kelly	250		
Turnout		1,510	23.4	−13.9
Registered electors		6,459		
Labour hold		Swing		
Labour hold		Swing		
Labour hold		Swing		

=== Chadwell Heath ===
Chadwell Heath (3)
Party	Candidate	Votes	%	±%
Residents	Ronald Curtis*	1,347	62.2	+13.7
Residents	Albert Gibbs*	1,344		
Residents	Robert Jeyes*	1,287		
Labour	Donna Beckett	619	28.6	−10.1
Labour	Peter Metia	593		
Labour	Nana-Aba Andah	537		
Conservative	Mary Justice	201	9.3	+2.4
Turnout		2,136	31.7	−8.9
Registered electors		6,738		
Residents hold		Swing		
Residents hold		Swing		
Residents hold		Swing		

=== Eastbrook ===
Eastbrook (3)
Party	Candidate	Votes	%	±%
Labour	Lawrence Bunn*	1,238	73.6	−8.5
Labour	Leonard Collins^{†} (Note: Collins was a sitting councillor representing the Valence ward)	1,089		
Labour	Sidney Summerfield	1,077		
Liberal Democrats	Graham E. Churchman	444	26.4	−8.5
Turnout		1,646	25.1	−10.0
Registered electors		6,551		
Labour hold		Swing		
Labour hold		Swing		
Labour hold		Swing		

=== Eastbury ===
Eastbury (2)
Party	Candidate	Votes	%	±%
Liberal Democrats	Stephen Churchman*	870	51.1	+1.1
Labour	Patrick Manley*	833	48.9	−1.1
Liberal Democrats	Daniel Felton	668		
Labour	David Miles	607		
Turnout		1,679	40.1	−16.0
Registered electors		4,190		
Liberal Democrats hold		Swing		
Labour hold		Swing		

=== Fanshawe ===
Fanshawe (3)
Party	Candidate	Votes	%	±%
Labour	Frederick Jones*	1,092	73.7	−9.2
Labour	Herbert Collins	1,065		
Labour	Raymond Parkin*	927		
Liberal Democrats	Winifred Chapman	390	26.3	+9.2
Turnout		1,521	24.7	−12.1
Registered electors		6,153		
Labour hold		Swing		
Labour hold		Swing		
Labour hold		Swing		

=== Gascoigne ===
Gascoigne (3)
Party	Candidate	Votes	%	±%
Labour	Kathleen Flint*	958	77.3	+15.8
Labour	Valerie Rush*	851		
Labour	Milton McKenzie	800		
Liberal Democrats	Claire Stepton	282	22.7	−15.8
Liberal Democrats	Bryan Tester	238		
Liberal Democrats	Robert Pembroke	229		
Turnout		1,277	23.4	−11.1
Registered electors		5,451		
Labour hold		Swing		
Labour hold		Swing		
Labour hold		Swing		

=== Goresbrook ===
Goresbrook (2)
Party	Candidate	Votes	%	±%
Labour	Terence Power*	805	66.1	−17.7
Labour	Alan Thomas*	723		
Liberal Democrats	Liam Smith	413	33.9	+17.7
Liberal Democrats	Peter Downs	344		
Turnout		1,291	24.5	+13.8
Registered electors		5,265		
Labour hold		Swing		
Labour hold		Swing		

=== Heath ===
Heath (3)
Party	Candidate	Votes	%	±%
Labour	Charles Fairbrass	1,150	69.0	−21.3
Labour	Sidney Kallar	1,075		
Labour	John Lawrence	1,002		
Conservative	Linda Hallewell	265	15.9	N/A
Liberal Democrats	Alison South	251	15.1	+5.4
Liberal Democrats	Margaret Tester	197		
Turnout		1,553	23.7	−13.1
Registered electors		6,556		
Labour hold		Swing		
Labour hold		Swing		
Labour hold		Swing		

=== Longbridge ===
Longbridge (3)
Party	Candidate	Votes	%	±%
Labour	Madeleine Baker	1,074	57.7	+8.7
Labour	Susan Bramley	1,069		
Labour	Nirmal Gill*	870		
Liberal Democrats	Alan Cooper	786	42.3	−16.8
Liberal Democrats	Jayne Cooper	778		
Liberal Democrats	Edith Downs	713		
Turnout		2,023	30.2	−15.1
Registered electors		6,707		
Labour hold		Swing		
Labour hold		Swing		
Labour hold		Swing		

=== Manor ===
Manor (2)
Party	Candidate	Votes	%	±%
Labour	June Conyard* (Note: Conyard was elected in a by-election triggered by the resignation of Cllr Alastair Hannah-Rogers)	803	77.5	−3.2
Labour	Rita Hannah-Rogers*	753		
Liberal Democrats	David Boorman	233	22.5	+3.2
Turnout		1,080	22.9	−15.4
Registered electors		4,710		
Labour hold		Swing		
Labour hold		Swing		

=== Marks Gate ===
Marks Gate (2)
Party	Candidate	Votes	%	±%
Labour	Maureen Worby*	651	79.6	+1.6
Labour	Colin Pond	524		
Liberal Democrats	Anthony Pace	167	20.4	−1.6
Turnout		896	25.0	−12.4
Registered electors		3,580		
Labour hold		Swing		
Labour hold		Swing		

=== Parsloes ===
Parsloes (2)
Party	Candidate	Votes	%	±%
Labour	Jean Blake	763	77.2	−0.8
Labour	Steven Gill* (Note: Gill was elected in a by-election triggered by the death of Cllr Joseph Butler in 1995)	700		
Liberal Democrats	Emma Smith	225	22.8	+0.8
Liberal Democrats	Wendy Churchman	220		
Turnout		1,091	23.5	−15.3
Registered electors		4,641		
Labour hold		Swing		
Labour hold		Swing		

=== River ===
River (2)
Party	Candidate	Votes	%	±%
Labour	Patricia Twomey*	768	75.9	−2.4
Labour	Inder Jamu*	597		
Liberal Democrats	Hayley Downs	244	24.1	+2.4
Turnout		985	20.7	−12.9
Registered electors		4,754		
Labour hold		Swing		
Labour hold		Swing		

=== Thames ===
Thames (2)
Party	Candidate	Votes	%	±%
Labour	George Shaw*	941	72.5	−4.4
Labour	Royston Patient*	914		
Thames View Environmental and Residents Association	Edward Mussett	287	22.1	N/A
Thames View Environmental and Residents Association	Charles Lambert	285		
Liberal Democrats	David Oram	70	5.4	−4.9
Turnout		1,345	30.8	−15.7
Registered electors		4,458		
Labour hold		Swing		
Labour hold		Swing		

=== Triptons ===
Triptons (3)
Party	Candidate	Votes	%	±%
Labour	John Davis*	1,167	79.7	−3.6
Labour	Margaret West	1,011		
Labour	Cameron Geddes*	920		
Liberal Democrats	June Griffin	297	20.3	+3.6
Liberal Democrats	Paul South	275		
Turnout		1,521	23.7	+12.1
Registered electors		6,414		
Labour hold		Swing		
Labour hold		Swing		
Labour hold		Swing		

=== Valence ===
Valence (3)
Party	Candidate	Votes	%	±%
Labour	Bryan Osborn*	939	74.6	−5.9
Labour	Jean Bruce*	915		
Labour	Vera Cridland	902		
Liberal Democrats	Sally Storer	320	25.4	+5.9
Turnout		1,400	22.2	−16.2
Registered electors		6,298		
Labour hold		Swing		
Labour hold		Swing		
Labour hold		Swing		

=== Village ===
Village (3)
Party	Candidate	Votes	%	±%
Labour	Katherine Golden*	1,146	70.1	−8.8
Labour	Darrin Best*	1,112		
Labour	William Dale*	1,041		
Conservative	Kenneth Coombs	280	17.1	+7.1
Conservative	Susan Hallewell	262		
Liberal Democrats	Anthony Pickford	209	12.8	+1.7
Liberal Democrats	Trevor Johnson	184		
Turnout		1,681	23.5	−13.4
Registered electors		7,166		
Labour hold		Swing		
Labour hold		Swing		
Labour hold		Swing		

== By-elections between 1998 and 2002 ==
=== Goresbrook ===
Goresbrook by-election, 13 May 1999
Party	Candidate	Votes	%	±%
Liberal Democrats	Liam Smith	834	56.3	+22.4
Labour	William Barns	646	43.7	−22.4
Majority		188	12.6	N/A
Turnout		1,485	27.8	+3.3
Registered electors		5,333		
Liberal Democrats gain from Labour		Swing		

The by-election was called following the resignation of Cllr. Terence Power.

=== Eastbury ===
Eastbury by-election, 14 October 1999
Party	Candidate	Votes	%	±%
Liberal Democrats	Alan Cooper	949	70.8	+19.7
Labour	David Miles	342	25.5	−23.4
Conservative	Brian Cook	50	3.7	+3.7
Majority		607	55.3	N/A
Turnout		1,345	31.8	−8.3
Registered electors		4,226		
Liberal Democrats hold		Swing		

The by-election was called following the resignation of Cllr. Stephen Churchman.

=== Marks Gate ===
Marks Gate by-election, 27 September 2001
Party	Candidate	Votes	%	±%
Labour	Michael McCarthy	443	56.6	+23.0
Conservative	Terence Justice	290	37.0	+37.0
Liberal Democrats	Jonathan Lopez-Real	27	3.4	−17.0
Green	Geoffrey Hunwicks	23	2.9	+2.9
Majority		153	19.6	N/A
Turnout			20.0	−5.0
Registered electors				
Labour hold		Swing		

The by-election was called following the death of Cllr. Colin Pond.
