= Valence (ward) =

Electoral ward in London, England

- Electoral ward for the Barking and Dagenham London Borough Council
- Valence ward boundaries since 2022
- Borough: Barking and Dagenham
- County: Greater London
- Population: 15,481 (2021) (Note: 2021 Census data reported for 2022 ward boundaries)
- Electorate: 9,811 (2022)
- Area: 1.539 square kilometres (0.594 sq mi)

Current electoral ward
- Created: 1965
- Councillors: Jane Jones; Syed Ghani; Kim Barti
- GSS code: E05000040 (2002–2022); E05014069 (2022–present)

Valence is an electoral ward in the London Borough of Barking and Dagenham.

== Barking and Dagenham council elections since 2022 ==
There was a revision of ward boundaries in Barking and Dagenham in 2022.

=== 2026 election ===
The election took place on 7 May 2026.

2026 Barking and Dagenham London Borough Council election: Valence
Party	Candidate	Votes	%	±%
Labour	Syed Ghani	1,270	37.6	−26.8
Labour	Jane Jones	1,189	35.2	−36.6
Reform	Kim Barti	1,186	35.1	N/A
Reform	Barb Gibbs	1,160	34.3	N/A
Labour	Laura Iosifescu	1,112	32.9	N/A
Reform	Mavis Oti Boakye	1,075	31.8	N/A
Green	Saqib Bashir	880	26.0	N/A
Conservative	Mark Akindeko	348	10.30	N/A
Liberal Democrats	Amber Ijaz	309	9.1	N/A
Conservative	Vivien Ojo	277	8.2	N/A
Conservative	Goodluck Uba	230	6.8	N/A
Turnout		3,378	32.8	+11.5
Registered electors		10,296		
Labour hold		Swing		
Labour hold		Swing		
Reform gain from Labour		Swing		

=== 2022 election ===
The election took place on 5 May 2022.

2022 Barking and Dagenham London Borough Council election: Valence
Party	Candidate	Votes	%	±%
Labour	Jane Jones	1,514	31.3	N/A
Labour	Maureen Worby	1,403	29.0	N/A
Labour	Syed Ghani	1,358	28.0	N/A
Conservative	Kevin Londeno	570	11.8	N/A
Turnout		2,108	21.3	N/A
Registered electors		9,811		
Labour win (new boundaries)				
Labour win (new boundaries)				
Labour win (new boundaries)				

== 2002–2022 Barking and Dagenham council elections ==
There was a revision of ward boundaries in Barking and Dagenham in 2002.

=== 2018 election ===
The election took place on 3 May 2018.

=== 2014 election ===
The election took place on 22 May 2014.

=== 2010 election ===
The election on 6 May 2010 took place on the same day as the United Kingdom general election.

=== 2006 election ===
The election took place on 4 May 2006.

=== 2002 election ===
The election took place on 2 May 2002.

== 1978–2002 Barking and Dagenham council elections ==
There was a revision of ward boundaries in Barking in 1978. The name of the borough and council changed from Barking to Barking and Dagenham on 1 January 1980.

=== 1998 election ===
The election took place on 7 May 1998.

1998 Barking and Dagenham London Borough Council election: Valence
Party	Candidate	Votes	%	±%
Labour	Bryan Osborn	939	74.6	−5.9
Labour	Jean Bruce	915		
Labour	Vera Cridland	902		
Liberal Democrats	Sally Storer	320	25.4	+5.9
Turnout		1,400	22.2	−16.2
Registered electors		6,298		
Labour hold		Swing		
Labour hold		Swing		
Labour hold		Swing		

=== 1994 election ===
The election took place on 5 May 1994.

1994 Barking and Dagenham London Borough Council election: Valence
Party	Candidate	Votes	%	±%
Labour	Jean Bruce	1,840	80.5	N/A
Labour	Leonard Collins	1,758		
Labour	Bryan Osborn	1,753		
Liberal Democrats	Irene Hilton	445	19.5	N/A
Liberal Democrats	Bryan Tester	339		
Turnout		2,497	38.4	N/A
Registered electors		6,502		
Labour hold		Swing		
Labour hold		Swing		
Labour hold		Swing		

=== 1990 election ===
The election took place on 3 May 1990.

=== 1986 election ===
The election took place on 8 May 1986.

=== 1982 election ===
The election took place on 6 May 1982.

1982 Barking and Dagenham London Borough Council election: Valence
Party	Candidate	Votes	%	±%
Labour	Richard Blackburn	1,215	90.6	+29.8
Labour	Matthew Eales	1,164		
Labour	Joan Foster	1,100		
Communist	Danny Marshall	126	9.4	+6.7
Turnout			23.6	−7.1
Registered electors		7,186		
Labour hold		Swing		
Labour hold		Swing		
Labour hold		Swing		

=== 1978 election ===
The election took place on 4 May 1978.

1978 Barking London Borough Council election: Valence
Party	Candidate	Votes	%	±%
Labour	Richard Blackburn	1,383	60.8	−9.6
Labour	Matthew Eales	1,267		N/A
Labour	Joanne Williams	1,249		N/A
Conservative	Terence McManus	432	19.0	+8.7
Conservative	William Middleton	358		N/A
Independent	Vera Cridland	213	9.4	N/A
National Front	John Benjafield	185	8.1	N/A
National Front	John Roberts	181		N/A
National Front	Michael Sowerby	168		N/A
Communist	Brian Corbett	62	2.7	−6.9
Turnout			30.7	+12.0
Registered electors		7,092		
Labour hold		Swing		
Labour hold		Swing		
Labour hold		Swing		

== 1964–1978 Barking council elections ==
=== 1974 election ===
The election took place on 2 May 1974.

1974 Barking London Borough Council election: Valence
Party	Candidate	Votes	%	±%
Labour	George Brooker	1,773	70.4	−12.3
Labour	John Davis	1,622		N/A
Labour	C Whitelock	1,581		N/A
Labour	R Wilkins	1,580		N/A
Conservative	S Barnard	259	10.3	−3.3
Ind. Labour Party	V Cridland	244	9.7	N/A
Communist	A Brooks	241	9.6	+3.2
Turnout			18.7	−8.1
Registered electors		9,770		
Labour hold		Swing		
Labour hold		Swing		
Labour hold		Swing		
Labour hold		Swing		

=== 1971 election ===
The election took place on 13 May 1971.

1971 Barking London Borough Council election: Valence
Party	Candidate	Votes	%	±%
Labour	George Brooker	2,612	82.7	+31.2
Labour	S Warr	2,549		N/A
Labour	E Kitchen	2,513		N/A
Labour	D Webb	2,480		N/A
Conservative	F Penfold	221	7.0	−14.6
Communist	L Evans	201	6.4	N/A
People's Democracy	H Bailey	124	3.9	N/A
Turnout			26.8	+6.1
Registered electors		9,966		
Labour hold		Swing		
Labour hold		Swing		
Labour hold		Swing		
Labour hold		Swing		

=== 1968 election ===
The election took place on 9 May 1968.

1968 Barking London Borough Council election: Valence
Party	Candidate	Votes	%	±%
Labour	George Brooker	1,159	51.5	−33.5
Labour	D Webb	1,146		N/A
Labour	S Warr	1,141		N/A
Labour	E Hennem	1,072		N/A
Conservative	J Harris	486	21.6	−10.7
Conservative	W Attridge	444		N/A
Conservative	A Sabourin	415		N/A
Conservative	S Herbert	377		N/A
Independent	Harold Larking	339	15.1	N/A
Communist	H Bailey	267	11.9	+7.8
Turnout			20.7	−2.4
Registered electors		9,637		
Labour hold		Swing		
Labour hold		Swing		
Labour hold		Swing		
Labour hold		Swing		

=== 1964 election ===
The election took place on 7 May 1964.

1964 Barking London Borough Council election: Valence
Party	Candidate	Votes	%	±%
Labour	H Larking	1,979	85.0	N/A
Labour	A Thomas	1,875		N/A
Labour	D Webb	1,871		N/A
Labour	F Woods	1,845		N/A
Conservative	R Denney	253	10.9	N/A
Conservative	M Penny	248		N/A
Conservative	J Denney	243		N/A
Conservative	A Edwards	236		N/A
Communist	W Hunt	95	4.1	N/A
Turnout		2,305	23.1	N/A
Registered electors		9,985		
Labour win (new seat)				
Labour win (new seat)				
Labour win (new seat)				
Labour win (new seat)				
