= 1968 Barking London Borough Council election =

English local election

The 1968 Barking Council election took place on 9 May 1968 to elect members of Barking London Borough Council in London, England. The whole council was up for election and the Labour Party stayed in overall control of the council.

== Background ==
This election was the second local election since the borough was formed in 1964. Thus, incumbent councillors were seeking re-election for the first time. Labour was the only party that ran a full slate of candidates.

== Results ==
Despite the Conservatives winning 13 additional councillors, the Labour Party maintained control electing 32 councillors to the Conservatives 13 and Resident Association 4.

== Results by ward ==
=== Abbey ===
Abbey (4)
Party	Candidate	Votes	%	±%
Conservative	T Woodcock	1,749	53.8	+18.2
Conservative	E Eden	1,746		N/A
Conservative	J Willmott	1,732		N/A
Conservative	R Hawken	1,685		N/A
Labour	Leonard Henstock	1,042	32.0	−15.9
Labour	Mary Bredo	1,038		N/A
Labour	Stan Sivell	948		N/A
Labour	John Ward	884		N/A
Liberal	D Wade	462	14.2	−2.2
Liberal	J Tyrell	400		N/A
Liberal	R Litchfield	361		N/A
Liberal	B Nicholls	329		N/A
Turnout			35.7	−1.4
Registered electors		9,275		
Conservative gain from Labour		Swing		
Conservative gain from Labour		Swing		
Conservative gain from Labour		Swing		
Conservative gain from Labour		Swing		

=== Cambell ===
Cambell (4)
Party	Candidate	Votes	%	±%
Labour	Joseph Butler	1,465	78.1	−14.1
Labour	Sidney Cole	1,342		N/A
Labour	Doris Jones	1,330		N/A
Labour	James Jones	1,293		N/A
Conservative	B Fuller	411	21.9	+14.1
Conservative	J Kelly	377		N/A
Conservative	L Ouzmann	377		N/A
Conservative	D Tanner	376		N/A
Turnout			21.2	−2.3
Registered electors		8,775		
Labour hold		Swing		
Labour hold		Swing		
Labour hold		Swing		
Labour hold		Swing		

=== Chadwell Heath ===
Chadwell Heath (4)
Party	Candidate	Votes	%	±%
Residents	D Grandison	2,054	74.8	+28.8
Residents	Peggy Miller	2,041		N/A
Residents	C Jillings	2,040		N/A
Residents	Cyril Ayres	2,032		N/A
Labour	E Bradley	506	18.4	−14.4
Labour	F Rusha	496		N/A
Labour	F Goodger	485		N/A
Labour	W Webb	481		N/A
Communist	D Connor	185	6.7	+3.8
Turnout			29.3	−2.1
Registered electors		9,276		
Residents hold		Swing		
Residents hold		Swing		
Residents hold		Swing		
Residents hold		Swing		

=== Eastbrook ===
Eastbrook (4)
Party	Candidate	Votes	%	±%
Labour	Frederick Tibble	1,166	53.2	−13.9
Labour	Leonard Collins	1,157		N/A
Labour	Jack Thomas	1,122		N/A
Labour	John Lawrence	1,082		N/A
Conservative	R Johnson	602	27.5	+20.3
Conservative	A Middleton	569		N/A
Conservative	A Sabourin	554		N/A
Conservative	P Wilkins	537		N/A
Liberal	H Cooper	268	12.2	−9.5
Liberal	Y Dodman	231		N/A
Liberal	G Andrews	224		N/A
Communist	C King	156	7.1	+3.1
Turnout			22.0	−7.1
Registered electors		9,751		
Labour hold		Swing		
Labour hold		Swing		
Labour hold		Swing		
Labour hold		Swing		

=== Fanshawe ===
Fanshawe (4)
Party	Candidate	Votes	%	±%
Labour	M Warren	1,221	63.4	−7.0
Labour	Frederick Jones	1,214		N/A
Labour	J Fackerell	1,175		N/A
Labour	Brian Walker	1,174		N/A
Conservative	J Watts	408	21.2	−2.5
Communist	K Madden	296	15.4	+9.7
Turnout			18.9	−7.0
Registered electors		9,618		
Labour hold		Swing		
Labour hold		Swing		
Labour hold		Swing		
Labour hold		Swing		

=== Gascoigne ===
Gascoigne (4)
Party	Candidate	Votes	%	±%
Labour	J Engwell	1,694	57.5	−19.0
Labour	Catherine Godfrey	1,662		N/A
Labour	Horace Howie	1,613		N/A
Labour	Douglas Waters	1,562		N/A
Conservative	R Pool	665	22.6	+13.2
Conservative	A Gray	655		N/A
Conservative	J Barnett	619		N/A
Conservative	B Woodcock	580		N/A
Liberal	Alan Beadle	393	13.3	N/A
Liberal	P Nicholls	336		N/A
Communist	G Wake	192	6.5	+1.9
Turnout			28.8	−0.1
Registered electors		9,763		
Labour hold		Swing		
Labour hold		Swing		
Labour hold		Swing		
Labour hold		Swing		

=== Heath ===
Heath (5)
Party	Candidate	Votes	%	±%
Conservative	D Attridge	1,189	49.6	+35.3
Conservative	A East	1,139		N/A
Conservative	E Woods	1,131		N/A
Conservative	L Rimington	1,124		N/A
Conservative	W Padington	1,111		N/A
Labour	Richard Blackburn	1,051	43.8	−19.9
Labour	William Noyce	1,013		N/A
Labour	Matthew Eales	996		N/A
Labour	H Powell	946		N/A
Labour	J Kendall	944		N/A
Communist	Helena Ott	159	6.6	+3.1
Turnout			22.5	−3.1
Registered electors		10,869		
Conservative gain from Labour		Swing		
Conservative gain from Labour		Swing		
Conservative gain from Labour		Swing		
Conservative gain from Labour		Swing		
Conservative gain from Labour		Swing		

=== Longbridge ===
Longbridge (4)
Party	Candidate	Votes	%	±%
Conservative	V Pool	2,341	64.1	+19.2
Conservative	C Pool	2,307		N/A
Conservative	J Dean	2,161		N/A
Conservative	D Barnett	2,088		N/A
Labour	F Butler	1,313	35.9	−19.2
Labour	L Senior	1,284		N/A
Labour	Eric Mansell	1,254		N/A
Labour	R Godfrey	1,248		N/A
Turnout			33.6	−5.1
Registered electors		10,671		
Conservative gain from Labour		Swing		
Conservative gain from Labour		Swing		
Conservative gain from Labour		Swing		
Conservative gain from Labour		Swing		

=== Manor ===
Manor (4)
Party	Candidate	Votes	%	±%
Labour	Maud Ball	1,600	76.6	−9.5
Labour	Gilbert Beane	1,551		N/A
Labour	Millicent Preston	1,509		N/A
Labour	L Blake	1,505		N/A
Conservative	A Beasley	489	23.4	+9.5
Conservative	I Fuller	401		N/A
Conservative	J Eden	399		N/A
Conservative	F Tisdell	392		N/A
Turnout			22.4	−0.8
Registered electors		9,231		
Labour hold		Swing		
Labour hold		Swing		
Labour hold		Swing		
Labour hold		Swing		

=== River ===
River (4)
Party	Candidate	Votes	%	±%
Labour	David Dodd	856	51.7	−21.9
Labour	D Linehan	769		N/A
Labour	E Kitchen	751		N/A
Labour	F Spraggins	730		N/A
Conservative	T Fitzpatrick	641	38.7	+31.0
Conservative	J Anker	633		N/A
Conservative	M Whiter	602		N/A
Conservative	W Whiter	574		N/A
Communist	W Pocock	160	9.7	−6.2
Turnout		-6.6	18.9	−6.6
Registered electors		8,556		
Labour hold		Swing		
Labour hold		Swing		
Labour hold		Swing		
Labour hold		Swing		

=== Valence ===
Valence (4)
Party	Candidate	Votes	%	±%
Labour	George Brooker	1,159	51.5	−33.5
Labour	D Webb	1,146		N/A
Labour	S Warr	1,141		N/A
Labour	E Hennem	1,072		N/A
Conservative	J Harris	486	21.6	−10.7
Conservative	W Attridge	444		N/A
Conservative	A Sabourin	415		N/A
Conservative	S Herbert	377		N/A
Independent	Harold Larking	339	15.1	N/A
Communist	H Bailey	267	11.9	+7.8
Turnout			20.7	−2.4
Registered electors		9,637		
Labour hold		Swing		
Labour hold		Swing		
Labour hold		Swing		
Labour hold		Swing		

=== Village ===
Village (4)
Party	Candidate	Votes	%	±%
Labour	Vic Rusha	1,048	35.9	−33.5
Labour	Matthew Spencer	992		N/A
Labour	R Coster	961		N/A
Labour	Harry Tindell	948		N/A
Independent	A Fry	681	23.3	N/A
Conservative	T Edwards	675	23.1	+7.7
Conservative	J Calver	640		N/A
Conservative	J Symes	597		N/A
Conservative	C Wilkens	555		N/A
Liberal	G Poole	389	13.3	+0.6
Liberal	T Moody	268		N/A
Liberal	R Burlinson	212		N/A
Liberal	F Shaw	186		N/A
Communist	R Shannon	129	4.4	+1.9
Turnout			26.7	−4.2
Registered electors		9,012		
Labour hold		Swing		
Labour hold		Swing		
Labour hold		Swing		
Labour hold		Swing		

== By-elections between 1968 and 1971 ==
There were no by-elections.
