= 1964 Barking London Borough Council election =

1964 local election in Barking

The 1964 Barking Borough Council election took place on 7 May 1964 to elect members of Barking London Borough Council in London, England. The whole council was up for election and the Labour Party gained control of the council.

== Background ==
These elections were the first to the newly formed borough. Previously elections had taken place in the Municipal Borough of Barking and Municipal Borough of Dagenham. These boroughs were joined to form the new London Borough of Barking by the London Government Act 1963.

A total of 130 candidates stood in the election for the 49 seats being contested across 12 wards. These included a full slate from the Labour Party, while the Conservative and Liberal parties stood 41 and 25 respectively. Other candidates included 10 from the Communist Party, 4 Residents and 1 Independent Liberal. There were 11 four-seat wards and 1 five-seat ward.

This election had aldermen as well as directly elected councillors. Labour got all 8 aldermen.

The council was elected in 1964 as a "shadow authority" but did not start operations until 1 April 1965.

== Results ==
The results saw Labour gain the new council with a majority of 41 after winning 45 of the 49 seats. Overall turnout in the election was 29.1%. This turnout included 228 postal votes.

== Results by ward ==
=== Abbey ===
Abbey (4)
Party	Candidate	Votes	%	±%
Labour	Mary Bredo	1,838	47.9	N/A
Labour	Leonard Henstock	1,835		N/A
Labour	Stan Sivell	1,759		N/A
Labour	Jessie Callan	1,741		N/A
Conservative	V Pool	1,366	35.6	N/A
Conservative	H Hamshere	1,357		N/A
Conservative	A Gray	1,331		N/A
Conservative	M Taylor	1,292		N/A
Liberal	Alan Beadle	630	16.4	N/A
Liberal	H Claxton	582		N/A
Liberal	J Tyrrell	568		N/A
Liberal	W Duckworth	466		N/A
Turnout		3,864	37.1	N/A
Registered electors		10,428		
Labour win (new seat)				
Labour win (new seat)				
Labour win (new seat)				
Labour win (new seat)				

=== Cambell ===
Cambell (4)
Party	Candidate	Votes	%	±%
Labour	Jack Sweetland	2,007	92.2	N/A
Labour	Bertie Roycraft	2,003		N/A
Labour	Sidney Cole	1,986		N/A
Labour	Joseph Butler	1,963		N/A
Conservative	B Woodcock	169	7.8	N/A
Turnout		2,161	23.5	N/A
Registered electors		9,212		
Labour win (new seat)				
Labour win (new seat)				
Labour win (new seat)				
Labour win (new seat)				

=== Chadwell Heath ===
Chadwell Heath (4)
Party	Candidate	Votes	%	±%
Residents	D Grandison	1,636	46.0	N/A
Residents	C Jillings	1,577		N/A
Residents	Cyril Ayres	1,560		N/A
Residents	H Jones	1,495		N/A
Labour	S Warr	1,168	32.8	N/A
Labour	J Moore	1,088		N/A
Labour	John Lawrence	1,088		N/A
Labour	C Ayrton	1,059		N/A
Conservative	R Holland	651	18.3	N/A
Conservative	A Cobban	606		N/A
Conservative	G Santry	606		N/A
Conservative	G Herer	583		N/A
Communist	D Connor	104	2.9	N/A
Turnout		3,391	31.4	N/A
Registered electors		9,076		
Residents win (new seat)				
Residents win (new seat)				
Residents win (new seat)				
Residents win (new seat)				

=== Eastbrook ===
Eastbrook (4)
Party	Candidate	Votes	%	±%
Labour	G Crouch	1,975	67.1	N/A
Labour	J Hollidge	1,959		N/A
Labour	Frederick Tibble	1,903		N/A
Labour	Jack Thomas	1,873		N/A
Liberal	G Keegan	637	21.7	N/A
Liberal	G Atkin	619		N/A
Liberal	L Brendon	602		N/A
Liberal	A Newbury	577		N/A
Conservative	R Johnson	211	7.2	N/A
Conservative	A Middleton	199		N/A
Conservative	J Calver	198		N/A
Conservative	J Bradford	195		N/A
Communist	M Edwards	119	4.0	N/A
Communist	C King	64		N/A
Turnout		2,905	29.1	N/A
Registered electors		9,991		
Labour win (new seat)				
Labour win (new seat)				
Labour win (new seat)				
Labour win (new seat)				

=== Fanshawe ===
Fanshawe (4)
Party	Candidate	Votes	%	±%
Labour	Fred Brown	1,946	70.4	N/A
Labour	Frederick Jones	1,916		N/A
Labour	M Warren	1,908		N/A
Labour	W Milne	1,868		N/A
Liberal	R Muller	516	18.7	N/A
Liberal	J Goldner	349		N/A
Liberal	A Williams	306		N/A
Liberal	V Kettelty	300		N/A
Conservative	E Barrow	159	5.7	N/A
Communist	K Madden	145	5.2	N/A
Conservative	J Smith	133		N/A
Conservative	J Stonebank	133		N/A
Conservative	D Simms	118		N/A
Turnout		2,567	25.9	N/A
Registered electors		9,903		
Labour win (new seat)				
Labour win (new seat)				
Labour win (new seat)				
Labour win (new seat)				

=== Gascoigne ===
Gascoigne (4)
Party	Candidate	Votes	%	±%
Labour	A Martin	2,349	76.5	N/A
Labour	R Godfrey	2,228		N/A
Labour	Catherine Godfrey	2,227		N/A
Labour	H Cleaver	2,195		N/A
Independent Liberal	A Hollis	292	9.5	N/A
Conservative	J Stubbs	288	9.4	N/A
Conservative	C Russell	264		N/A
Communist	G Wake	140	4.6	N/A
Turnout		2,848	28.9	N/A
Registered electors		9,849		
Labour win (new seat)				
Labour win (new seat)				
Labour win (new seat)				
Labour win (new seat)				

=== Heath ===
Heath (5)
Party	Candidate	Votes	%	±%
Labour	William Bellamy	1,897	63.7	N/A
Labour	William Noyce	1,857		N/A
Labour	Richard Blackburn	1,852		N/A
Labour	F Spraggins	1,808		N/A
Labour	H Powell	1,776		N/A
Liberal	G Andrews	553	18.6	N/A
Liberal	D Purdue	552		N/A
Liberal	W Chesney	540		N/A
Liberal	H Corcoran	528		N/A
Liberal	F Thompson	524		N/A
Conservative	R Pascoe	425	14.3	N/A
Conservative	A Morley	422		N/A
Conservative	K Coomber	421		N/A
Conservative	E Woods	405		N/A
Conservative	R Wells	400		N/A
Communist	A Bower	104	3.5	N/A
Communist	C Truefitt-Baker	26		N/A
Turnout		2,911	25.6	N/A
Registered electors		11,349		
Labour win (new seat)				
Labour win (new seat)				
Labour win (new seat)				
Labour win (new seat)				
Labour win (new seat)				

=== Longbridge ===
Longbridge (4)
Party	Candidate	Votes	%	±%
Labour	E McKee	2,280	55.1	N/A
Labour	John Ward	2,265		N/A
Labour	L Senior	2,240		N/A
Labour	F Edgecombe	2,222		N/A
Conservative	H Hills	1,861	44.9	N/A
Conservative	F Westbrook	1,845		N/A
Conservative	J Willmott	1,837		N/A
Conservative	C Pool	1,830		N/A
Turnout		4,229	38.7	N/A
Registered electors		10,920		
Labour win (new seat)				
Labour win (new seat)				
Labour win (new seat)				
Labour win (new seat)				

=== Manor ===
Manor (4)
Party	Candidate	Votes	%	±%
Labour	Albert Ball	1,893	86.1	N/A
Labour	Maud Ball	1,888		N/A
Labour	Gilbert Beane	1,748		N/A
Labour	Millicent Preston	1,678		N/A
Conservative	J Broadbridge	305	13.9	N/A
Turnout		2,221	23.2	N/A
Registered electors		9,582		
Labour win (new seat)				
Labour win (new seat)				
Labour win (new seat)				
Labour win (new seat)				

=== River ===
River (4)
Party	Candidate	Votes	%	±%
Labour	David Dodd	1,722	73.6	N/A
Labour	D O’Dwyer	1,678		N/A
Labour	Daniel Linehan	1,643		N/A
Labour	David Linehan	1,620		N/A
Liberal	H Cadman	353	15.1	N/A
Liberal	A Burlinson	281		N/A
Liberal	J Pritchard	272		N/A
Liberal	H Sharman	268		N/A
Conservative	A Sabourin	181	7.7	N/A
Conservative	E Bloomfield	178		N/A
Conservative	M Whiter	177		N/A
Conservative	W Whiter	167		N/A
Communist	Alfred Ott	83	3.5	N/A
Turnout		2,303	25.5	N/A
Registered electors		9,035		
Labour win (new seat)				
Labour win (new seat)				
Labour win (new seat)				
Labour win (new seat)				

=== Valence ===
Valence (4)
Party	Candidate	Votes	%	±%
Labour	Harold Larking	1,979	85.0	N/A
Labour	A Thomas	1,875		N/A
Labour	D Webb	1,871		N/A
Labour	F Woods	1,845		N/A
Conservative	R Denney	253	10.9	N/A
Conservative	M Penny	248		N/A
Conservative	J Denney	243		N/A
Conservative	A Edwards	236		N/A
Communist	W Hunt	95	4.1	N/A
Turnout		2,305	23.1	N/A
Registered electors		9,985		
Labour win (new seat)				
Labour win (new seat)				
Labour win (new seat)				
Labour win (new seat)				

=== Village ===
Village (4)
Party	Candidate	Votes	%	±%
Labour	Charles Prendergast	1,980	69.4	N/A
Labour	Vic Rusha	1,929		N/A
Labour	L Todd	1,874		N/A
Labour	R Foster	1,772		N/A
Conservative	W Russell	439	15.4	N/A
Conservative	P Steele	390		N/A
Conservative	A Sabourin	386		N/A
Conservative	T Edwards	381		N/A
Liberal	G Poole	362	12.7	N/A
Liberal	T Moody	290		N/A
Liberal	R Burlinson	264		N/A
Liberal	G Bisney	254		N/A
Communist	Helena Ott	71	2.5	N/A
Turnout		2,761	30.9	N/A
Registered electors		8,933		
Labour win (new seat)				
Labour win (new seat)				
Labour win (new seat)				
Labour win (new seat)				

== By-elections between 1964 and 1968 ==
There were no by-elections.
