= Heath (Barking and Dagenham ward) =

Electoral ward in London, England

- Electoral ward for the Barking and Dagenham London Borough Council
- Heath ward boundaries since 2022
- Borough: Barking and Dagenham
- County: Greater London
- Population: 8,994 (2021) (Note: 2021 Census data reported for 2022 ward boundaries)
- Electorate: 5,901 (2022)
- Area: 1.630 square kilometres (0.629 sq mi)

Current electoral ward
- Created: 1965
- Councillors: Ingrid Robinson; Harriet Spoor
- GSS code: E05000034 (2002–2022; E05014063 (2022–present)

Heath is an electoral ward in the London Borough of Barking and Dagenham.

== Barking and Dagenham council elections since 2022 ==
There was a revision of ward boundaries in Barking and Dagenham in 2022.

=== 2026 election ===
The election took place on 7 May 2026.

2026 Barking and Dagenham London Borough Council election: Heath
Party	Candidate	Votes	%	±%
Labour	Ingrid Robinson	959	48.1	−19.1
Labour	Harriet Spoor	883	44.3	N/A
Reform	Lee Willoughby	662	33.2	N/A
Reform	Sunil Idiculla	603	30.2	N/A
Conservative	Abdullah Alam	250	12.5	N/A
Liberal Democrats	Naveed Akbar	225	11.3	N/A
Conservative	Corine Mengalle	167	8.4	N/A
Turnout		1,994	32.9	+9.8
Registered electors		6,059		
Labour hold		Swing		
Labour hold		Swing		

=== 2023 by-election ===
The by-election took place on 30 March 2023, following the death of Olawale Martins.

2023 Heath by-election
Party	Candidate	Votes	%	±%
Labour	Harriet Spoor	777	62.1	N/A
Conservative	Joe Lynch	408	32.6	N/A
Green	Kim Arrowsmith	41	3.3	N/A
Liberal Democrats	Zygimantas Adomavicius	26	2.1	N/A
Majority		369	29.5	N/A
Turnout		1,252	21.8	−1.3
Registered electors		5,774		
Labour hold		Swing		

=== 2022 election ===
The election took place on 5 May 2022.

2022 Barking and Dagenham London Borough Council election: Heath
Party	Candidate	Votes	%	±%
Labour	Olawale Martins	952	37.2	N/A
Labour	Ingrid Robinson	930	36.4	N/A
Conservative	Martynas Cekavicius	338	13.2	N/A
Conservative	Angelica Olawepo	338	13.2	N/A
Turnout		1,383	23.1	N/A
Registered electors		5,901		
Labour win (new boundaries)				
Labour win (new boundaries)				

== 2002–2022 Barking and Dagenham council elections ==
There was a revision of ward boundaries in Barking and Dagenham in 2002.

=== 2018 election ===
The election took place on 3 May 2018.

=== 2014 election ===
The election took place on 22 May 2014.

=== 2010 election ===
The election on 6 May 2010 took place on the same day as the United Kingdom general election.

=== 2006 election ===
The election took place on 4 May 2006.

=== 2002 election ===
The election took place on 2 May 2002.

2002 Barking and Dagenham London Borough Council election: Heath
Party	Candidate	Votes	%	±%
Labour	Charles Fairbrass	966	57.6	+11.4
Labour	Bryan Osborn	918		
Labour	Sidney Kallar	904		
Conservative	George Woodward	362	21.6	+5.7
Liberal Democrats	Benjamin Whyte	349	20.8	+5.7
Liberal Democrats	Antony Stepton	328		
Turnout		1,514	21.8	−1.9
Registered electors		6,951		
Labour win (new boundaries)				
Labour win (new boundaries)				
Labour win (new boundaries)				

== 1978–2002 Barking and Dagenham council elections ==
There was a revision of ward boundaries in Barking in 1978. The name of the borough and council changed from Barking to Barking and Dagenham on 1 January 1980.

=== 1998 election ===
The election took place on 7 May 1998.

=== 1994 election ===
The election took place on 5 May 1994.

=== 1990 election ===
The election took place on 3 May 1990.

=== 1986 election ===
The election took place on 8 May 1986.

=== 1982 election ===
The election took place on 6 May 1982.

=== 1978 election ===
The election took place on 4 May 1978.

1978 Barking London Borough Council election: Heath
Party	Candidate	Votes	%	±%
Labour	Charles Fairbrass	1,502	64.8	−5.5
Labour	John Allam	1,442		N/A
Labour	Brian Wilkins	1,331		N/A
Conservative	Leonard Groves	681	29.4	−5.7
Conservative	Joan Preston	660		N/A
Communist	Helena Ott	135	5.8	−0.2
Turnout			30.4	+13.1
Registered electors		7,698		
Labour hold		Swing		
Labour hold		Swing		
Labour hold		Swing		

== 1964–1978 Barking council elections ==
=== 1974 election ===
The election took place on 2 May 1974.

1974 Barking London Borough Council election: Heath
Party	Candidate	Votes	%	±%
Labour	Charles Fairbrass	2,020	70.3	−8.5
Labour	J Thomas	1,947		N/A
Labour	Brian Wilkins	1,890		N/A
Labour	K Darby	1,794		N/A
Labour	Thomas Reynolds	1,668		N/A
Conservative	Ada Horrell	682	23.7	−7.0
Conservative	Sydney Horrell	659		N/A
Communist	Helena Ott	173	6.0	+1.4
Turnout			17.3	−8.0
Registered electors		12,548		
Labour hold		Swing		
Labour hold		Swing		
Labour hold		Swing		
Labour hold		Swing		
Labour hold		Swing		

=== 1971 election ===
The election took place on 13 May 1971.

1971 Barking London Borough Council election: Heath
Party	Candidate	Votes	%	±%
Labour	William Noyce	2,754	78.7	+34.9
Labour	John Davis	2,740		N/A
Labour	Charles Fairbrass	2,726		N/A
Labour	J Lawrence	2,648		N/A
Labour	Jack Thomas	2,625		N/A
Conservative	J Doyle	584	16.7	−32.9
Conservative	R Barrett	574		N/A
Conservative	C Barrett	570		N/A
Conservative	L Pyke	554		N/A
Conservative	A Sabourin	523		N/A
Communist	Helena Ott	161	4.6	−2.0
Turnout			25.3	+2.8
Registered electors		13,022		
Labour gain from Conservative		Swing		
Labour gain from Conservative		Swing		
Labour gain from Conservative		Swing		
Labour gain from Conservative		Swing		
Labour gain from Conservative		Swing		

=== 1968 election ===
The election took place on 9 May 1968.

1968 Barking London Borough Council election: Heath
Party	Candidate	Votes	%	±%
Conservative	D Attridge	1,189	49.6	+35.3
Conservative	A East	1,139		N/A
Conservative	E Woods	1,131		N/A
Conservative	L Rimington	1,124		N/A
Conservative	W Padington	1,111		N/A
Labour	Richard Blackburn	1,051	43.8	−19.9
Labour	William Noyce	1,013		N/A
Labour	Matthew Eales	996		N/A
Labour	H Powell	946		N/A
Labour	J Kendall	944		N/A
Communist	Helena Ott	159	6.6	+3.1
Turnout			22.5	−3.1
Registered electors		10,869		
Conservative gain from Labour		Swing		
Conservative gain from Labour		Swing		
Conservative gain from Labour		Swing		
Conservative gain from Labour		Swing		
Conservative gain from Labour		Swing		

=== 1964 election ===
The election took place on 7 May 1964.

1964 Barking London Borough Council election: Heath
Party	Candidate	Votes	%	±%
Labour	W Bellamy	1,897	63.7	N/A
Labour	William Noyce	1,857		N/A
Labour	R Blackburn	1,852		N/A
Labour	F Spraggins	1,808		N/A
Labour	H Powell	1,776		N/A
Liberal	G Andrews	553	18.6	N/A
Liberal	D Purdue	552		N/A
Liberal	W Chesney	540		N/A
Liberal	H Corcoran	528		N/A
Liberal	F Thompson	524		N/A
Conservative	R Pascoe	425	14.3	N/A
Conservative	A Morley	422		N/A
Conservative	K Coomber	421		N/A
Conservative	E Woods	405		N/A
Conservative	R Wells	400		N/A
Communist	A Bower	104	3.5	N/A
Communist	C Truefitt-Baker	26		N/A
Turnout		2,911	25.6	N/A
Registered electors		11,349		
Labour win (new seat)				
Labour win (new seat)				
Labour win (new seat)				
Labour win (new seat)				
Labour win (new seat)				
