= 1974 Barking London Borough Council election =

The 1974 Barking Borough Council election took place on 2 May 1974 to elect members of Barking London Borough Council in London, England. The whole council was up for election and the Labour Party stayed in overall control of the council.

== Background ==
100 Candidates across 7 parties ran. Labour was the only party that ran a full slate of candidates. The Conservative Party ran 25 candidates and the Liberal Party ran 11 candidates.

== Results ==
Labour comfortably maintained its majority holding all of its seats. The Residents Association held all 4 of its Councillors. Labour won 45 councillors to the Residents Association 4.

== Results by ward ==
=== Abbey ===
Abbey (4)
| Party | Candidate | Votes | % | ±% |
|---|---|---|---|---|
| Labour | Jean Bruce | 1,959 | 55.7 | −0.2 |
| Labour | Horace Howie | 1,956 | | N/A |
| Labour | J Longden | 1,899 | | N/A |
| Labour | A Puddefoot | 1,891 | | N/A |
| Liberal | Alan Beadle | 926 | 26.4 | +17.6 |
| Liberal | Martin Taylor | 905 | | N/A |
| Liberal | D Keenan | 820 | | N/A |
| Liberal | M Staines | 817 | | N/A |
| Conservative | C Martin | 629 | 17.9 | −4.5 |
| Conservative | A Gray | 623 | | N/A |
| Conservative | J Barnett | 594 | | N/A |
| Conservative | W Williamson | 575 | | N/A |
| Turnout | | | 31.8 | −4.2 |
| Registered electors | | 10,691 | | |
| Labour hold | | Swing | | |
| Labour hold | | Swing | | |
| Labour hold | | Swing | | |
| Labour hold | | Swing | | |

=== Cambell ===
Cambell (4)
| Party | Candidate | Votes | % | ±% |
|---|---|---|---|---|
| Labour | Joseph Butler | 1,884 | 90.2 | −2.8 |
| Labour | Sidney Cole | 1,877 | | N/A |
| Labour | Doris Jones | 1,788 | | N/A |
| Labour | James Jones | 1,679 | | N/A |
| Conservative | B Williamson | 205 | 9.8 | +2.8 |
| Turnout | | | 20.9 | −6.4 |
| Registered electors | | 8,849 | | |
| Labour hold | | Swing | | |
| Labour hold | | Swing | | |
| Labour hold | | Swing | | |
| Labour hold | | Swing | | |

=== Chadwell Heath ===
Chadwell Heath (4)
| Party | Candidate | Votes | % | ±% |
|---|---|---|---|---|
| Residents | D Grandison | 1,783 | 54.9 | +1.2 |
| Residents | Cyril Ayres | 1,763 | | N/A |
| Residents | Peggy Miller | 1,733 | | N/A |
| Residents | Joan Harper | 1,698 | | N/A |
| Labour | F Coomber | 898 | 27.7 | −13.9 |
| Labour | L Henstock | 872 | | N/A |
| Labour | J O'Donogue | 841 | | N/A |
| Labour | J Tweed | 817 | | N/A |
| Conservative | G Hyams | 413 | 12.7 | N/A |
| Conservative | L Hyams | 360 | | N/A |
| Communist | D Connor | 151 | 4.7 | −0.1 |
| Turnout | | | 29.9 | −0.9 |
| Registered electors | | 9,459 | | |
| Residents hold | | Swing | | |
| Residents hold | | Swing | | |
| Residents hold | | Swing | | |
| Residents hold | | Swing | | |

=== Eastbrook ===
Eastbrook (4)
| Party | Candidate | Votes | % | ±% |
|---|---|---|---|---|
| Labour | Frederick Tibble | 1,824 | 80.3 | −5.3 |
| Labour | Leonard Collins | 1,812 | | N/A |
| Labour | Arthur Biles | 1,791 | | N/A |
| Labour | John Lawrence | 1,772 | | N/A |
| Conservative | Reginald Johnson | 301 | 13.2 | +5.7 |
| Conservative | William Maule | 222 | | N/A |
| Communist | J Carter | 147 | 6.5 | −0.5 |
| Turnout | | | 19.3 | −6.6 |
| Registered electors | | 10,177 | | |
| Labour hold | | Swing | | |
| Labour hold | | Swing | | |
| Labour hold | | Swing | | |
| Labour hold | | Swing | | |

=== Fanshawe ===
Fanshawe (4)
| Party | Candidate | Votes | % | ±% |
|---|---|---|---|---|
| Labour | Frederick Jones | 1,823 | 81.3 | −5.2 |
| Labour | Matthew Eales | 1,736 | | N/A |
| Labour | Brian Walker | 1,681 | | N/A |
| Labour | Ernest Turner | 1,651 | | N/A |
| Communist | K Madden | 233 | 10.4 | +1.8 |
| Conservative | M Whiter | 187 | 8.3 | +3.4 |
| Conservative | William Whiter | 168 | | N/A |
| Turnout | | | 19.6 | −10.0 |
| Registered electors | | 9,553 | | |
| Labour hold | | Swing | | |
| Labour hold | | Swing | | |
| Labour hold | | Swing | | |
| Labour hold | | Swing | | |

=== Gascoigne ===
Gascoigne (4)
| Party | Candidate | Votes | % | ±% |
|---|---|---|---|---|
| Labour | Eric Harris | 2,640 | 82.8 | −8.3 |
| Labour | Catherine Godfrey | 2,591 | | N/A |
| Labour | George Shaw | 2,536 | | N/A |
| Labour | Douglas Waters | 2,536 | | N/A |
| Conservative | R Reed | 335 | 10.5 | +1.6 |
| Communist | Frederick Creamer | 215 | 6.7 | N/A |
| Turnout | | | 26.4 | −9.5 |
| Registered electors | | 10,277 | | |
| Labour hold | | Swing | | |
| Labour hold | | Swing | | |
| Labour hold | | Swing | | |
| Labour hold | | Swing | | |

=== Heath ===
Heath (5)
| Party | Candidate | Votes | % | ±% |
|---|---|---|---|---|
| Labour | Charles Fairbrass | 2,020 | 70.3 | −8.5 |
| Labour | Jack Thomas | 1,947 | | N/A |
| Labour | Brian Wilkins | 1,890 | | N/A |
| Labour | K Darby | 1,794 | | N/A |
| Labour | Thomas Reynolds | 1,668 | | N/A |
| Conservative | Ada Horrell | 682 | 23.7 | −7.0 |
| Conservative | Sydney Horrell | 659 | | N/A |
| Communist | Helena Ott | 173 | 6.0 | +1.4 |
| Turnout | | | 17.3 | −8.0 |
| Registered electors | | 12,548 | | |
| Labour hold | | Swing | | |
| Labour hold | | Swing | | |
| Labour hold | | Swing | | |
| Labour hold | | Swing | | |
| Labour hold | | Swing | | |

=== Longbridge ===
Longbridge (4)
| Party | Candidate | Votes | % | ±% |
|---|---|---|---|---|
| Labour | John Cavanagh | 1,649 | 49.2 | −12.5 |
| Labour | Marie Cole | 1,560 | | N/A |
| Labour | Michael O'Shea | 1,463 | | N/A |
| Labour | M Ness | 1,361 | | N/A |
| Conservative | C Pool | 1,067 | 31.8 | −6.5 |
| Conservative | V Pool | 998 | | N/A |
| Conservative | Dennis Barnett | 958 | | N/A |
| Conservative | Edward Reed | 947 | | N/A |
| Liberal | G Vernon | 635 | 18.9 | N/A |
| Liberal | R Keenan | 615 | | N/A |
| Liberal | D Felton | 611 | | N/A |
| Liberal | J James | 609 | | N/A |
| Turnout | | | 29.1 | −3.1 |
| Registered electors | | 10,724 | | |
| Labour hold | | Swing | | |
| Labour hold | | Swing | | |
| Labour hold | | Swing | | |
| Labour hold | | Swing | | |

=== Manor ===
Manor (4)
| Party | Candidate | Votes | % | ±% |
|---|---|---|---|---|
| Labour | Maud Ball | 796 | 80.8 | −6.6 |
| Labour | Eric Mansell | 648 | | N/A |
| Labour | Mabel Arnold | 623 | | N/A |
| Labour | Millicent Preston | 519 | | N/A |
| Conservative | R Pool | 189 | 19.2 | +6.6 |
| Turnout | | | 7.5 | −21.0 |
| Registered electors | | 9,230 | | |
| Labour hold | | Swing | | |
| Labour hold | | Swing | | |
| Labour hold | | Swing | | |
| Labour hold | | Swing | | |

=== River ===
River (4)
| Party | Candidate | Votes | % | ±% |
|---|---|---|---|---|
| Labour | James Morton | 1,516 | 80.9 | −1.3 |
| Labour | Peter Bradley | 1,508 | | N/A |
| Labour | Edith Bradley | 1,504 | | N/A |
| Labour | Ernest White | 1,380 | | N/A |
| Conservative | V Nainby | 236 | 12.6 | ±0.0 |
| Conservative | J Patterson | 208 | | N/A |
| Communist | G Wake | 122 | 6.5 | +1.2 |
| Turnout | | | 19.4 | −5.4 |
| Registered electors | | 8,322 | | |
| Labour hold | | Swing | | |
| Labour hold | | Swing | | |
| Labour hold | | Swing | | |
| Labour hold | | Swing | | |

=== Valence ===
Valence (4)
| Party | Candidate | Votes | % | ±% |
|---|---|---|---|---|
| Labour | George Brooker | 1,773 | 70.4 | −12.3 |
| Labour | John Davis | 1,622 | | N/A |
| Labour | C Whitelock | 1,581 | | N/A |
| Labour | R Wilkins | 1,580 | | N/A |
| Conservative | S Barnard | 259 | 10.3 | −3.3 |
| Ind. Labour Party | V Cridland | 244 | 9.7 | N/A |
| Communist | A Brooks | 241 | 9.6 | +3.2 |
| Turnout | | | 18.7 | −8.1 |
| Registered electors | | 9,770 | | |
| Labour hold | | Swing | | |
| Labour hold | | Swing | | |
| Labour hold | | Swing | | |
| Labour hold | | Swing | | |

=== Village ===
Village (4)
| Party | Candidate | Votes | % | ±% |
|---|---|---|---|---|
| Labour | Vic Rusha | 1,652 | 64.4 | −16.7 |
| Labour | Leonard Bryant | 1,610 | | N/A |
| Labour | Matthew Spencer | 1,595 | | N/A |
| Labour | Harry Tindell | 1,544 | | N/A |
| Liberal | G Poole | 421 | 16.4 | N/A |
| Liberal | P Northover | 318 | | N/A |
| Liberal | G Andrews | 301 | | N/A |
| Conservative | W Russell | 257 | 10.0 | −3.0 |
| Conservative | W Whiter | 235 | | N/A |
| Conservative | A Wilkens | 213 | | N/A |
| Free Socialist | W Metcalfe | 122 | 4.8 | N/A |
| Communist | T Keyworth | 114 | 4.4 | −1.5 |
| Turnout | | | 21.6 | −3.8 |
| Registered electors | | 9,694 | | |
| Labour hold | | Swing | | |
| Labour hold | | Swing | | |
| Labour hold | | Swing | | |
| Labour hold | | Swing | | |

== By-elections between 1974 and 1978 ==
There were no by-elections.
