= 1971 Barking London Borough Council election =

1971 local election in England

The 1971 Barking Borough Council election took place on 13 May 1971, to elect members of Barking London Borough Council in London, England. The whole council was up for election, and the Labour Party stayed in overall control of the council.

== Background ==
96 candidates across 6 parties ran. Labour was the only party that ran a full slate of candidates.

== Results ==
Labour comfortably maintained its majority. The Conservatives lost all 13 of its councillors to Labour whilst the Residents Association held all 4 of its Councillors. Labour won 45 councillors to the Residents Association 4.

== Results by ward ==
=== Abbey ===
Abbey (4)
Party	Candidate	Votes	%	±%
Labour	Mary Bredo	2,459	55.9	+23.9
Labour	A Howie	2,434		N/A
Labour	J Tweed	2,317		N/A
Labour	J Longden	2,278		N/A
Conservative	E Lacey	984	22.4	−31.4
Conservative	E Reed	829		N/A
Conservative	R Trew	824		N/A
Conservative	J Willmott	822		N/A
Conservative Party (Unofficial)	T Woodcock	567	12.9	N/A
Liberal	Alan Beadle	386	8.8	−5.4
Liberal	D Wade	328		N/A
Liberal	G Poole	258		N/A
Liberal	Martin Taylor	254		N/A
Turnout			36.0	−0.3
Registered electors		10,248		
Labour gain from Conservative		Swing		
Labour gain from Conservative		Swing		
Labour gain from Conservative		Swing		
Labour gain from Conservative		Swing		

=== Cambell ===
Cambell (4)
Party	Candidate	Votes	%	±%
Labour	Joseph Butler	2,594	93.0	+14.9
Labour	Sidney Cole	2,501		N/A
Labour	Doris Jones	2,494		N/A
Labour	James Jones	2,426		N/A
Conservative	D Reed	194	7.0	−14.9
Turnout			27.3	+6.1
Registered electors		9,364		
Labour hold		Swing		
Labour hold		Swing		
Labour hold		Swing		
Labour hold		Swing		

=== Chadwell Heath ===
Chadwell Heath (4)
Party	Candidate	Votes	%	±%
Residents	Peggy Miller	1,719	53.7	−21.1
Residents	H Jones	1,633		N/A
Residents	D Grandison	1,631		N/A
Residents	Cyril Ayres	1,575		N/A
Labour	H Pope	1,331	41.6	+23.2
Labour	W Webb	1,308		N/A
Labour	V Pope	1,292		N/A
Labour	Robert Crane	1,267		N/A
Communist	D Connor	153	4.8	−1.9
Turnout			30.8	+1.5
Registered electors		9,669		
Residents hold		Swing		
Residents hold		Swing		
Residents hold		Swing		
Residents hold		Swing		

=== Eastbrook ===
Eastbrook (4)
Party	Candidate	Votes	%	±%
Labour	Leonard Collins	2,663	85.6	+32.4
Labour	Frederick Tibble	2,648		N/A
Labour	F Coomber	2,583		N/A
Labour	James Morton	2,550		N/A
Conservative	W Whiter	232	7.5	−20.0
Communist	C Baker	217	7.0	−0.1
Turnout			25.9	+3.9
Registered electors		10,498		
Labour hold		Swing		
Labour hold		Swing		
Labour hold		Swing		
Labour hold		Swing		

=== Fanshawe ===
Fanshawe (4)
Party	Candidate	Votes	%	±%
Labour	Frederick Jones	2,868	86.5	+23.1
Labour	J Blake	2,846		N/A
Labour	Ernest Turner	2,748		N/A
Labour	Brian Walker	2,666		N/A
Communist	K Madden	285	8.6	−6.8
Conservative	E Apps	163	4.9	−16.3
Turnout			29.6	+10.7
Registered electors		9,788		
Labour hold		Swing		
Labour hold		Swing		
Labour hold		Swing		
Labour hold		Swing		

=== Gascoigne ===
Gascoigne (4)
Party	Candidate	Votes	%	±%
Labour	J Engwell	2,970	91.1	+33.6
Labour	Catherine Godfrey	2,913		N/A
Labour	Horace Howie	2,877		N/A
Labour	Douglas Waters	2,763		N/A
Conservative	J Barnett	290	8.9	−13.7
Conservative	G Pool	285		N/A
Conservative	S Smith	267		N/A
Conservative	R Pool	265		N/A
Turnout			35.9	+7.1
Registered electors		8,792		
Labour hold		Swing		
Labour hold		Swing		
Labour hold		Swing		
Labour hold		Swing		

=== Heath ===
Heath (5)
Party	Candidate	Votes	%	±%
Labour	William Noyce	2,754	78.7	+34.9
Labour	John Davis	2,740		N/A
Labour	Charles Fairbrass	2,726		N/A
Labour	John Lawrence	2,648		N/A
Labour	Jack Thomas	2,625		N/A
Conservative	J Doyle	584	16.7	−32.9
Conservative	R Barrett	574		N/A
Conservative	C Barrett	570		N/A
Conservative	L Pyke	554		N/A
Conservative	A Sabourin	523		N/A
Communist	Helena Ott	161	4.6	−2.0
Turnout			25.3	+2.8
Registered electors		13,022		
Labour gain from Conservative		Swing		
Labour gain from Conservative		Swing		
Labour gain from Conservative		Swing		
Labour gain from Conservative		Swing		
Labour gain from Conservative		Swing		

=== Longbridge ===
Longbridge (4)
Party	Candidate	Votes	%	±%
Labour	R Godfrey	2,233	61.7	+25.8
Labour	M Ness	2,229		N/A
Labour	Michael O'Shea	2,203		N/A
Labour	Matthew Spencer	2,193		N/A
Conservative	A Gray	1,386	38.3	−25.8
Conservative	V Pool	1,382		N/A
Conservative	C Pool	1,356		N/A
Conservative	D Barnett	1,309		N/A
Turnout			32.2	−1.4
Registered electors		11,091		
Labour gain from Conservative		Swing		
Labour gain from Conservative		Swing		
Labour gain from Conservative		Swing		
Labour gain from Conservative		Swing		

=== Manor ===
Manor (4)
Party	Candidate	Votes	%	±%
Labour	Maud Ball	2,747	87.4	+10.8
Labour	L Blake	2,656		N/A
Labour	Eric Mansell	2,656		N/A
Labour	Millicent Preston	2,466		N/A
Conservative	B Long	396	12.6	−10.8
Turnout			28.5	+6.1
Registered electors		9,573		
Labour hold		Swing		
Labour hold		Swing		
Labour hold		Swing		
Labour hold		Swing		

=== River ===
River (4)
Party	Candidate	Votes	%	±%
Labour	David Dodd	1,908	82.1	+30.4
Labour	D Linehan	1,895		N/A
Labour	Edith Bradley	1,863		N/A
Labour	L Thompson	1,814		N/A
Conservative	E Brown	292	12.6	+18.4
Conservative	Ada Horrell	251		N/A
Conservative	F Read	229		N/A
Conservative	M Whiter	226		N/A
Communist	G Wake	124	5.3	N/A
Turnout			24.8	+5.9
Registered electors		8,665		
Labour hold		Swing		
Labour hold		Swing		
Labour hold		Swing		
Labour hold		Swing		

=== Valence ===
Valence (4)
Party	Candidate	Votes	%	±%
Labour	George Brooker	2,612	82.7	+31.2
Labour	S Warr	2,549		N/A
Labour	E Kitchen	2,513		N/A
Labour	D Webb	2,480		N/A
Conservative	F Penfold	221	7.0	−14.6
Communist	L Evans	201	6.4	N/A
People's Democracy	H Bailey	124	3.9	N/A
Turnout			26.8	+6.1
Registered electors		9,966		
Labour hold		Swing		
Labour hold		Swing		
Labour hold		Swing		
Labour hold		Swing		

=== Village ===
Village (4)
Party	Candidate	Votes	%	±%
Labour	Vic Rusha	2,125	81.1	+45.2
Labour	Leonard Bryant	2,066		N/A
Labour	R Coster	2,047		N/A
Labour	Harry Tindell	2,022		N/A
Conservative	W Attridge	341	13.0	−10.1
Conservative	J Calver	337		N/A
Conservative	A Wilkens	325		N/A
Conservative	R Johnson	312		N/A
Communist	R Shannon	154	5.9	−1.5
Turnout			25.4	−1.3
Registered electors		9,572		
Labour hold		Swing		
Labour hold		Swing		
Labour hold		Swing		
Labour hold		Swing		

== By-elections between 1971 and 1974 ==
=== Chadwell Heath ===
Chadwell Heath by-election, 14 October 1971
Party	Candidate	Votes	%	±%
Residents	P Jarvis	1,108	68.4	+13.5
Labour	H Pope	492	30.4	+2.7
Communist	D Connor	20	1.2	−3.5
Majority		616	38.0	N/A
Turnout			16.6	−12.7
Registered electors		9,731		
Residents hold		Swing		

=== Gascoigne ===
Gascoigne by-election, 2 December 1971
Party	Candidate	Votes	%	±%
Labour	George Shaw	1,442	93.2	+10.4
Liberal	M Taylor	106	6.8	+6.8
Majority		1,336	86.4	N/A
Turnout			17.4	−18.5
Registered electors		8,882		
Labour hold		Swing		

=== River ===
River by-election, 4 May 1972 (2 seats)
Party	Candidate	Votes	%	±%
Labour	Richard Blackburn	1,263		N/A
Labour	Ernest White	1,226		N/A
Conservative	Ada Horrell	209		N/A
Conservative	T Woodcock	201		N/A
Majority		N/A	N/A	N/A
Turnout			17.4	N/A
Registered electors		8,589		
Labour hold		Swing		
Labour hold		Swing		
