= Gascoigne (ward) =

Electoral ward in London, England

- Electoral ward for the Barking and Dagenham London Borough Council
- Gascoigne ward boundaries since 2022
- Borough: Barking and Dagenham
- County: Greater London
- Population: 10,831 (2021) (Note: 2021 Census data reported for 2022 ward boundaries)
- Major settlements: Barking
- Area: 1.006 square kilometres (0.388 sq mi)

Current electoral ward
- Created: 1965
- Number of members: 3
- Councillors: Alison Cormack; Moin Quadri; Nazrul Kazi
- ONS code: 00ABGD
- GSS code: E05000032 (2002–2022); E05014061 (2022–present)

Gascoigne is an electoral ward in the London Borough of Barking and Dagenham.

== Councillors ==
Election	Councillors		
2002	Kathleen Flint (Labour Party)	Milton McKenzie (Labour Party)	Valerie Rush (Labour Party)
2006	Kathleen Flint (Labour Party)	Milton McKenzie (Labour Party)	Valerie Rush (Labour Party)
2010	Saima Ashraf (Labour Party)	Dominic Twomey (Labour Party)	Abdul Aziz (Labour Party)
2014	Saima Ashraf (Labour Party)	Dominic Twomey (Labour Party)	Abdul Aziz (Labour Party)
2018	Saima Ashraf (Labour Party)	Dominic Twomey (Labour Party)	Abdul Aziz (Labour Party)
2022	Jack Shaw (Labour Party)	Dominic Twomey (Labour Party)	Alison Cormack (Labour Party)
2026	Moin Quadri (Green Party)	Nazrul Kazi (Green Party)	Alison Cormack (Labour Party)

== Barking and Dagenham council elections since 2022 ==
There was a revision of ward boundaries in Barking and Dagenham in 2022.

=== 2026 election ===
The election took place on 7 May 2026.

2026 Barking and Dagenham London Borough Council election: Gascoigne
Party	Candidate	Votes	%	±%
Green	Moin Quadri	964	38.5	N/A
Green	Nazrul Kazi	940	37.5	N/A
Labour	Alison Cormack	864	34.5	−46.2
Labour	Ashwin Balluck	862	34.4	N/A
Labour	Kaied Ghiyatha	791	31.6	N/A
Green	Silvia Rotaru	769	30.7	N/A
Conservative	Abedin Kazi	317	12.7	N/A
Reform	Vera Botnari	255	10.2	N/A
Conservative	Adriana Saldana	240	9.6	N/A
Reform	Mihaela Melinte	236	9.4	N/A
Conservative	Lilufar Begum	234	9.3	N/A
Reform	Tadas Karkauskas	225	9.0	N/A
Workers Party	Qasim Tahir	214	8.5	N/A
Liberal Democrats	Ayfer Cebi	84	3.4	N/A
Turnout		2,503	30.5	+6.3
Registered electors		8,193		
Green gain from Labour		Swing		
Green gain from Labour		Swing		
Labour hold		Swing		

=== 2022 election ===
The election took place on 5 May 2022.

2022 Barking and Dagenham London Borough Council election: Gascoigne
Party	Candidate	Votes	%	±%
Labour	Alison Cormack	1,272	32.0	N/A
Labour	Jack Shaw	1,146	28.8	N/A
Labour	Dominic Twomey	1,121	28.2	N/A
Conservative	Roma Tahir	283	7.1	N/A
TUSC	Ruth Mason	154	3.9	N/A
Turnout		1,576	24.2	N/A
Registered electors		6,448		
Labour win (new boundaries)				
Labour win (new boundaries)				
Labour win (new boundaries)				

== 2002–2022 Barking and Dagenham council elections ==
There was a revision of ward boundaries in Barking and Dagenham in 2002.

=== 2018 election ===
The election took place on 3 May 2018.

=== 2014 election ===
The election took place on 22 May 2014.

=== 2010 election ===
The election on 6 May 2010 took place on the same day as the United Kingdom general election.

=== 2006 election ===
The election took place on 4 May 2006.

=== 2002 election ===
The election took place on 2 May 2002.

2002 Barking and Dagenham London Borough Council election : Gascoigne
Party	Candidate	Votes	%	±%
Labour	Kay Flint	992	64.7	−12.6
Labour	Valerie Rush	863		
Labour	Milton McKenzie	857		
Liberal Democrats	Alan Cornwell	383	25.0	+2.3
Liberal Democrats	Bryan Tester	324		
Liberal Democrats	Stephen Gower	317		
Green	Hidir Yildirim	158	10.3	N/A
Turnout		1,474	24.2	+0.8
Registered electors		6,086		
Labour win (new boundaries)				
Labour win (new boundaries)				
Labour win (new boundaries)				

== 1978–2002 Barking and Dagenham council elections ==
There was a revision of ward boundaries in Barking in 1978. The name of the borough and council changed from Barking to Barking and Dagenham on 1 January 1980.

=== 1998 election ===
The election took place on 7 May 1998.

=== 1994 election ===
The election took place on 5 May 1994.

=== 1990 election ===
The election took place on 3 May 1990.

=== 1986 election ===
The election took place on 8 May 1986.

=== 1982 election ===
The election took place on 6 May 1982.

=== 1979 by-election ===
The by-election took place on 3 May 1979, following the death of Julia Engwell.

1979 Gascoigne by-election
Party	Candidate	Votes	%	±%
Labour	James Jones	2,258	54.7	−9.3
Conservative	Stanley Bray	1,255	30.4	+11.5
Liberal	David Spender	614	14.9	+3.9
Majority		1,003	24.3	N/A
Turnout			60.6	+35.9
Registered electors		6,865		
Labour hold		Swing		

=== 1978 election ===
The election took place on 4 May 1978.

1978 Barking London Borough Council election: Gascoigne
Party	Candidate	Votes	%	±%
Labour	Julia Engwell	1,648	64.0	−18.8
Labour	John Lawrence	1,501		N/A
Labour	Brian Walker	1,498		N/A
Conservative	Audrey Beasley	486	18.9	−8.4
Liberal	David Spender	284	11.0	N/A
National Front	Colin London	155	6.0	N/A
National Front	Harold Nash	123		N/A
Turnout			34.7	+8.3
Registered electors		7,092		
Labour hold		Swing		
Labour hold		Swing		
Labour hold		Swing		

== 1964–1978 Barking council elections ==
=== 1974 election ===
The election took place on 2 May 1974.

1974 Barking London Borough Council election: Gascoigne
Party	Candidate	Votes	%	±%
Labour	Eric Harris	2,640	82.8	−8.3
Labour	C Godfrey	2,591		N/A
Labour	George Shaw	2,536		N/A
Labour	Douglas Waters	2,536		N/A
Conservative	R Reed	335	10.5	+1.6
Communist	Frederick Creamer	215	6.7	N/A
Turnout			26.4	−9.5
Registered electors		10,277		
Labour hold		Swing		
Labour hold		Swing		
Labour hold		Swing		
Labour hold		Swing		

=== 1971 by-election ===
The by-election was held on 2 December 1971.

1971 Gascoigne by-election
Party	Candidate	Votes	%	±%
Labour	George Shaw	1,442	93.2	+10.4
Liberal	M Taylor	106	6.8	+6.8
Majority		1,336	86.4	N/A
Turnout			17.4	−18.5
Registered electors		8,882		
Labour hold		Swing		

=== 1971 election ===
The election took place on 13 May 1971.

1971 Barking London Borough Council election: Gascoigne
Party	Candidate	Votes	%	±%
Labour	J Engwell	2,970	91.1	+33.6
Labour	C Godfrey	2,913		N/A
Labour	Horace Howie	2,877		N/A
Labour	Douglas Waters	2,763		N/A
Conservative	J Barnett	290	8.9	−13.7
Conservative	G Pool	285		N/A
Conservative	S Smith	267		N/A
Conservative	R Pool	265		N/A
Turnout			35.9	+7.1
Registered electors		8,792		
Labour hold		Swing		
Labour hold		Swing		
Labour hold		Swing		
Labour hold		Swing		

=== 1968 election ===
The election took place on 9 May 1968.

1968 Barking London Borough Council election: Gascoigne
Party	Candidate	Votes	%	±%
Labour	J Engwell	1,694	57.5	−19.0
Labour	C Godfrey	1,662		N/A
Labour	Horace Howie	1,613		N/A
Labour	Douglas Waters	1,562		N/A
Conservative	R Pool	665	22.6	+13.2
Conservative	A Gray	655		N/A
Conservative	J Barnett	619		N/A
Conservative	B Woodcock	580		N/A
Liberal	Alan Beadle	393	13.3	N/A
Liberal	P Nicholls	336		N/A
Communist	G Wake	192	6.5	+1.9
Turnout			28.8	−0.1
Registered electors		9,763		
Labour hold		Swing		
Labour hold		Swing		
Labour hold		Swing		
Labour hold		Swing		

=== 1964 election ===
The election took place on 7 May 1964.

1964 Barking London Borough Council election: Gascoigne
Party	Candidate	Votes	%	±%
Labour	A Martin	2,349	76.5	N/A
Labour	R Godfrey	2,228		N/A
Labour	C Godfrey	2,227		N/A
Labour	H Cleaver	2,195		N/A
Independent Liberal	A Hollis	292	9.5	N/A
Conservative	J Stubbs	288	9.4	N/A
Conservative	C Russell	264		N/A
Communist	G Wake	140	4.6	N/A
Turnout		2,848	28.9	N/A
Registered electors		9,849		
Labour win (new seat)				
Labour win (new seat)				
Labour win (new seat)				
Labour win (new seat)				
