= 1994 Barking and Dagenham London Borough Council election =

1994 local election in England

1994 Barking and Dagenham Council election
- 5 May 1994

All 51 council seats up for election to Barking and Dagenham London Borough Council 26 seats needed for a majority
- Registered: 114,450
- Turnout: 44,311, 38.72% (▲0.12)

	First party	Second party
Party	Labour	Residents
Last election	73.46%, 44 seats	4.53%, 3 seats
Seats before	43	3
Seats won	47	3
Seat change	▲3	Steady
Popular vote	74,808	3,990
Percentage	73.35	3.91
Swing	▼0.11%	▼0.62%
	Third party	Fourth party
Party	Liberal Democrats	Ind. Labour Party
Last election	7.82%, 1 seat	New
Seats before	1	1
Seats won	1	0
Seat change	Steady	▼1
Popular vote	17,730	753
Percentage	17.39	0.74
Swing	▲9.57%	New
Council control before election
Labour
Council control after election
Labour

The 1994 Barking and Dagenham Borough Council election took place on 5 May 1994 to elect members of Barking and Dagenham London Borough Council in London, England. The whole council was up for election and the Labour Party stayed in overall control of the council.

== Background ==
117 candidates nominated in total. Labour again ran a full slate (48) and was the only party to do so, whilst the Liberal Democrats ran 47. By contrast the Conservative Party ran only 12 candidates.

== Election result ==
Labour continued to win a large majority of seats - 47 out of 51. The Residents Association held their 3 seats. The Liberal Democrats won 1 seat.

1994 Barking and Dagenham London Borough local elections
Party	Seats	Gains	Losses	Net gain/loss	Seats %	Votes %	Votes	+/−
Labour	47	5	1	▲4	92.16	73.35	74,808	▼0.11
Residents	3	0	0	Steady	5.88	3.91	3,990	▼0.62
Liberal Democrats	1	1	1	Steady	1.96	17.39	17,730	▲9.57
Conservative	0	0	0	Steady	0.00	3.90	3,974	▼10.14
Ind. Labour Party	0	0	1	▼1	0.00	0.74	753	New
Independent	0	0	0	Steady	0.00	0.47	476	New
BNP	0	0	0	Steady	0.00	0.25	252	New
Total	51						101,983	

== Ward results ==
(*) - Indicates an incumbent councillor

(†) - Indicates an incumbent councillor standing in a different ward

=== Abbey ===
Abbey (3 seats)
Party	Candidate	Votes	%	±%
Labour	Jeannette Alexander^{†} (Note: Alexander was a sitting councillor representing the Gascoigne ward)	1,601	61.3	−4.5
Labour	Graham Bramley*	1,562		
Labour	Mohammed Fani*	1,403		
Independent	Narain Kaul	476	18.2	N/A
Liberal Democrats	Claire Stepton	317	12.1	−4.3
Liberal Democrats	Anthony Stepton	310		
Liberal Democrats	Margaret Tester	273		
Conservative	John Stavers	217	8.3	−9.5
Conservative	Danielle Whitton	202		
Conservative	Robert Whitton	183		
Turnout		2,662	39.7	+4.5
Registered electors		6,700		
Labour hold		Swing		
Labour hold		Swing		
Labour hold		Swing		

=== Alibon ===
Alibon (2 seats)
Party	Candidate	Votes	%	±%
Labour	Terence Wade	1,208	84.4	+5.3
Labour	Ernest White*	1,189		
Liberal Democrats	Joan Cooper	224	15.6	+7.8
Liberal Democrats	Linda Luby	203		
Turnout		1,569	36.9	−0.6
Registered electors		4,252		
Labour hold		Swing		
Labour hold		Swing		

=== Becontree ===
Becontree (2 seats)
Party	Candidate	Votes	%	±%
Labour	Edith Bradley	1,354	81.2	N/A
Labour	John Wainwright^{†} (Note: Wainright was a sitting councillor representing the River ward)	1,292		
Liberal Democrats	Clifford Evans	313	18.8	N/A
Liberal Democrats	Linda McGuinness	294		
Turnout		1,760	33.9	N/A
Registered electors		5,183		
Labour win (new seat)				
Labour win (new seat)				

=== Cambell ===
Cambell (3 seats)
Party	Candidate	Votes	%	±%
Labour	Mabel Arnold	1,896	83.1	−1.8
Labour	Joan Rawlinson	1,839		
Labour	June van Roten^{†} (Note: van Roten was a sitting councillor representing the Longbridge ward)	1,742		
Liberal Democrats	Heather Boorman	385	16.9	N/A
Liberal Democrats	David Boorman	369		
Liberal Democrats	Elizabeth Durrant	322		
Turnout		2,561	38.3	+1.5
Registered electors		6,683		
Labour hold		Swing		
Labour hold		Swing		
Labour hold		Swing		

=== Chadwell Heath ===
Chadwell Heath (3 seats)
Party	Candidate	Votes	%	±%
Residents	Albert Gibbs*	1,362	48.5	−1.2
Residents	Ronald Curtis* (Note: Curtis replaced Cllr Raymond Gowland after his death in 1992.)	1,359		
Residents	Robert Jeyes*	1,269		
Labour	Violet Gasson	1,089	38.7	−0.5
Labour	Vera Cridland	1,071		
Labour	Malcolm Murchie	956		
Conservative	Mark Gilding	193	6.9	−5.2
Conservative	John Graham	183		
Liberal Democrats	Anil Fernando	167	5.9	N/A
Conservative	Sharon Keefe	143		
Turnout		2,776	40.6	−1.7
Registered electors		6,835		
Residents hold		Swing		
Residents hold		Swing		
Residents hold		Swing		

=== Eastbrook ===
Eastbrook (3 seats)
Party	Candidate	Votes	%	±%
Labour	Richard Blackburn*	1,788	82.1	+2.8
Labour	Frederick Tibble*	1,739		
Labour	Lawrence Bunn*	1,682		
Liberal Democrats	Angela Lambart	390	17.9	N/A
Liberal Democrats	Donna Lewis	328		
Liberal Democrats	Jacqueline Williams	317		
Turnout		2,399	35.1	−0.5
Registered electors		6,837		
Labour hold		Swing		
Labour hold		Swing		
Labour hold		Swing		

=== Eastbury ===
Eastbury (2 seats)
Party	Candidate	Votes	%	±%
Labour	Patrick Manley*	1,188	50.0	−1.9
Liberal Democrats	Stephen Churchman	1,186	50.0	+11.4
Liberal Democrats	Deborah Richardson	1,086		
Labour	Gordon Mayor	1,013		
Turnout		2,456	56.1	+5.5
Registered electors		4,375		
Labour hold		Swing		
Liberal Democrats gain from Labour		Swing		

=== Fanshawe ===
Fanshawe (3 seats)
Party	Candidate	Votes	%	±%
Labour	Frederick Jones*	1,788	82.9	−2.2
Labour	Raymond Parkin*	1,696		
Labour	John Thomas*	1,569		
Liberal Democrats	Margaret Deller	368	17.1	N/A
Liberal Democrats	Timothy Williams	350		
Turnout		2,383	36.8	+0.8
Registered electors		6,367		
Labour hold		Swing		
Labour hold		Swing		
Labour hold		Swing		

=== Gascoigne ===
Gascoigne (3 seats)
Party	Candidate	Votes	%	±%
Labour	Kathleen Flint	1,214	61.5	+10.8
Labour	Suzanne Kelly	1,147		
Labour	Valerie Rush	1,107		
Liberal Democrats	Alan Copper	760	38.5	−10.8
Liberal Democrats	David Oram	732		
Liberal Democrats	Richard Colclough	700		
Turnout		2,054	34.5	−3.0
Registered electors		5,955		
Labour hold		Swing		
Labour gain from Liberal Democrats		Swing		
Labour hold		Swing		

=== Goresbrook ===
Goresbrook (2 seats)
Party	Candidate	Votes	%	±%
Labour	Terence Power*	1,608	83.8	+5.5
Labour	Alan Thomas*	1,566		
Liberal Democrats	Peter Downs	310	16.2	+5.9
Liberal Democrats	Hayley Downs	306		
Turnout		2,057	38.3	+0.5
Registered electors		5,364		
Labour hold		Swing		
Labour hold		Swing		

=== Heath ===
Heath (3 seats)
Party	Candidate	Votes	%	±%
Labour	Charles Fairbrass*	1,907	90.3	+10.1
Labour	Sidney Kallar*	1,801		
Labour	John Lawrence*	1,762		
Liberal Democrats	Sylivia Eddy	205	9.7	N/A
Liberal Democrats	Steven Payne	192		
Liberal Democrats	Jean Kemnitz	166		
Turnout		2,491	36.8	+0.7
Registered electors		6,765		
Labour hold		Swing		
Labour hold		Swing		
Labour hold		Swing		

=== Longbridge ===
Longbridge (3 seats)
Party	Candidate	Votes	%	±%
Labour	David Sterry	1,442	49.0	+5.7
Labour	Dennis Bomberg	1,376		
Labour	Nirmal Gill*	1,325		
Liberal Democrats	Brian Beadle	752	25.5	+17.3
Conservative	Brian Cook	750	25.5	−13.6
Conservative	Peter Burch	741		
Conservative	Valerie Burch	712		
Liberal Democrats	Daniel Felton	613		
Liberal Democrats	Nigel Meyer	583		
Turnout		3,031	45.3	−1.5
Registered electors		6,688		
Labour hold		Swing		
Labour hold		Swing		
Labour hold		Swing		

=== Manor ===
Manor (2 seats)
Party	Candidate	Votes	%	±%
Labour	Alastair Hannah-Rogers*	1,401	80.7	+0.3
Labour	Rita Hannah-Rogers*	1,364		
Liberal Democrats	Roy Gregory	335	19.3	+7.3
Liberal Democrats	Mildred Kenworthy	283		
Turnout		1,779	38.3	−2.2
Registered electors		4,650		
Labour hold		Swing		
Labour hold		Swing		

=== Marks Gate ===
Marks Gate (2 seats)
Party	Candidate	Votes	%	±%
Labour	Maureen Worby*	921	78.0	−5.3
Labour	Peter Melia	845		
Liberal Democrats	Winifred Chapman	260	22.0	N/A
Liberal Democrats	Roger Miller	248		
Turnout		1,322	37.4	−7.4
Registered electors		3,539		
Labour hold		Swing		
Labour hold		Swing		

=== Parsloes ===
Parsloes (2 seats)
Party	Candidate	Votes	%	±%
Labour	Joseph Butler	1,000	49.1	−23.4
Labour	Brian Walker*	947		
Independent Labour	John Dias-Broughton	753	37.0	N/A
Liberal Democrats	Wendy Churchman	282	13.9	+2.0
Liberal Democrats	John Richardson	252		
Turnout		1,890	38.8	+0.2
Registered electors		4,865		
Labour hold		Swing		
Labour hold		Swing		

=== River ===
River (2 seats)
Party	Candidate	Votes	%	±%
Labour	Patricia Twomey^{†} (Note: Twomey was a sitting councillor representing the Alibon ward. Twomey replaced Cllr Trevor Watson after his resignation in 1992)	1,200	78.3	−2.2
Labour	Inder Jamu*	1,064		
Liberal Democrats	Robert Mansfield	332	21.7	N/A
Liberal Democrats	Leonard McGuinness	239		
Turnout		1,624	33.6	+1.1
Registered electors		4,828		
Labour hold		Swing		
Labour hold		Swing		

=== Thames ===
Thames (2 seats)
Party	Candidate	Votes	%	±%
Labour	George Shaw*	1,517	76.9	−13.0
Labour	Royston Patient*	1,476		
BNP	Gary Hewitt*	252	12.8	N/A
Liberal Democrats	Catherine Kelly	204	10.3	+0.2
Liberal Democrats	John Kelly	191		
Turnout		1,999	46.5	+4.6
Registered electors		4,300		
Labour hold		Swing		
Labour hold		Swing		

=== Triptons ===
Triptons (3 seats)
Party	Candidate	Votes	%	±%
Labour	George Brooker*	1,804	83.3	+9.9
Labour	John Davis*	1,749		
Labour	Cameron Geddes*	1,560		
Liberal Democrats	Kenneth Barker	362	16.7	+5.9
Liberal Democrats	June Griffin	327		
Liberal Democrats	Anthony Walker	322		
Turnout		2,371	35.8	−2.9
Registered electors		6,628		
Labour hold		Swing		
Labour hold		Swing		
Labour hold		Swing		

=== Valence ===
Valence (3 seats)
Party	Candidate	Votes	%	±%
Labour	Jean Bruce*	1,840	80.5	N/A
Labour	Leonard Collins*	1,758		
Labour	Bryan Osborn*	1,753		
Liberal Democrats	Irene Hilton	445	19.5	N/A
Liberal Democrats	Bryan Tester	339		
Turnout		2,497	38.4	N/A
Registered electors		6,502		
Labour hold		Swing		
Labour hold		Swing		
Labour hold		Swing		

=== Village ===
Village (3 seats)
Party	Candidate	Votes	%	±%
Labour	Katherine Golden*	1,968	78.9	+4.7
Labour	Darrin Best*	1,872		
Labour	William Dale*	1,849		
Liberal Democrats	Peter Lepley	276	11.1	+2.6
Liberal Democrats	Linda Holmes	264		
Conservative	Kenneth Coombs	250	10.0	−7.3
Liberal Democrats	Samuel Hodge	248		
Conservative	Terence Mallindine	205		
Conservative	William Preston	195		
Turnout		2,630	36.9	+1.3
Registered electors		7,134		
Labour hold		Swing		
Labour hold		Swing		
Labour hold		Swing		

== By-elections between 1994 and 1998 ==
=== Manor ===
Manor by-election, 9 November 1995
Party	Candidate	Votes	%	±%
Labour	June Conyard	657	86.7	+6.0
Liberal Democrats	David Oram	101	13.3	−6.0
Majority		556	73.4	N/A
Turnout			16.6	−21.7
Registered electors				
Labour hold		Swing		

The by-election was called following the resignation of Cllr. Alastair Hannah-Rogers.

=== Parsloes ===
Parsloes by-election, 9 November 1995
Party	Candidate	Votes	%	±%
Labour	Steven Gill	604	57.1	+8.0
Independent Labour	John Broughton	360	34.1	−2.9
Liberal Democrats	Alan Cooper	93	8.8	−5.1
Majority		244	23.0	N/A
Turnout			22.3	−16.5
Registered electors				
Labour hold		Swing		

The by-election was called following the death of Cllr. Joseph Butler.
