= 2002 Barking and Dagenham London Borough Council election =

2002 local election in England

2002 Barking and Dagenham Council election
- 2 May 2002

All 51 council seats to Barking and Dagenham London Borough Council 26 seats needed for a majority
	First party	Second party
Party	Labour	Chadwell Heath RA
Last election	47 seats	3 seats
Seats won	42	4
Seat change	▼5	▲1
Popular vote	14,654	1,444
Percentage	55.6	5.5
Swing	-14.4	-1.0
	Third party	Fourth party
Party	Liberal Democrats	Conservative
Last election	1 seats	0 seats
Seats won	3	2
Seat change	▲2	▲2
Popular vote	6,115	3,638
Percentage	23.2	13.8
Swing	+21.6	-4.8
- Map of the results of the 2002 Barking and Dagenham council election. Labour in red, Chadwell Heath Residents Association in grey, Liberal Democrats in yellow and Conservatives in blue.
Council control before election
Labour
Council control after election
Labour

Elections for Barking and Dagenham London Borough Council were held on 2 May 2002 to elect members to the council. All seats were up for election following boundary changes since the last election in 1998. The Labour Party kept overall control of the council, but lost 5 seats. Overall turnout was 22.76%.

== Background ==
100 candidates were nominated in total. Labour again ran a full slate (51) and was the only party to do so. By contrast the Conservative Party ran only 12 candidates, whilst the Liberal Democrats ran 28.

== Election result ==
Barking and Dagenham local election results 2002 (Note: gains and losses do not include the winning of new seats)
Party	Seats	Gains	Losses	Net gain/loss	Seats %	Votes %	Votes	+/−
Labour	42	0	-2	-5	82.4	55.6	14,654	
Liberal Democrats	3	1	0	+2	5.9	23.2	6,115	
Conservative	2	2	0	+2	3.9	13.8	3,638	
Chadwell Heath RA	4	0	-1	+1	7.8	5.5	1,444	
Green	0	0	0	±0.0	0.0	1.2	306	
Independent	0	0	0	±0.0	0.0	0.8	210	

== Ward results ==
=== Abbey ===
Abbey (3)
Party	Candidate	Votes	%	±%
Labour	Jeanne Alexander	997	70.1	−1.1
Labour	Graham Bramley	921		
Labour	Mohammed Fani	895		
Liberal Democrats	Brian Beadle	426	29.9	+1.1
Liberal Democrats	June Griffin	387		
Liberal Democrats	Margaret Tester	354		
Turnout		1,536	22.9	−4.4
Registered electors		3,580		
Labour hold		Swing		
Labour hold		Swing		
Labour hold		Swing		

=== Alibon ===
Alibon (3)
Party	Candidate	Votes	%	±%
Labour	Terry Wade	743	67.4	−5.3
Labour	John Davis	724		
Labour	Mick McCarthy	632		
Conservative	Mary Justice	360	32.6	+19.4
Turnout		1,264	19.1	−5.4
Registered electors		6,631		
Labour hold		Swing		
Labour hold		Swing		
Labour win (new seat)				

=== Becontree ===
Becontree (3)
Party	Candidate	Votes	%	±%
Labour	Edith Bradley	841	65.8	−10.0
Labour	John Wainwright	686		
Labour	Cameron Geddes	684		
Liberal Democrats	Rosemary Roberts	438	34.2	+10.0
Turnout		1,229	17.0	−2.8
Registered electors		7,212		
Labour hold		Swing		
Labour hold		Swing		
Labour win (new seat)				

=== Chadwell Heath ===
Chadwell Heath (3)
Party	Candidate	Votes	%	±%
Residents	Ronald Curtis	682	35.6	−26.6
Residents	Robert Jeyes	667		
Conservative	Terry Justice	642	33.5	+24.2
Residents	Donna Lewis	624		
Labour	Patricia Northover	594	31.0	+2.4
Labour	Abdul Aziz	513		
Labour	Alok Agrawal	485		
Turnout		1,827	26.7	−5.0
Registered electors		6,855		
Residents hold		Swing		
Residents hold		Swing		
Conservative gain from Residents		Swing		

=== Eastbrook ===
Eastbrook (3)
Party	Candidate	Votes	%	±%
Labour	Lawrence Bunn	1,003	51.8	−21.8
Labour	Leonard Collins	936		
Labour	Sidney Summerfield	893		
Conservative	Sue Connolly	725	37.4	N/A
Conservative	Kerry Smith	717		
Conservative	Vivian Patten	677		
Independent	Mike Butler	210	10.8	N/A
Turnout		1,897	25.6	+0.5
Registered electors		7,419		
Labour hold		Swing		
Labour hold		Swing		
Labour hold		Swing		

=== Eastbury ===
Eastbury (3)
Party	Candidate	Votes	%	±%
Liberal Democrats	Alan Cooper	986	56.4	+5.3
Liberal Democrats	Jayne Cooper	930		
Liberal Democrats	Daniel Felton	885		
Labour	June Arnold	763	43.6	−5.3
Labour	Pat Manley	760		
Labour	Rocky Gill	648		
Turnout		1,873	25.8	−14.3
Registered electors		7,255		
Liberal Democrats hold		Swing		
Liberal Democrats gain from Labour		Swing		
Liberal Democrats win (new seat)				

=== Gascoigne ===
Gascoigne (3)
Party	Candidate	Votes	%	±%
Labour	Kay Flint	992	64.7	−12.6
Labour	Valerie Rush	863		
Labour	Milton McKenzie	857		
Liberal Democrats	Alan Cornwell	383	25.0	+2.3
Liberal Democrats	Bryan Tester	324		
Liberal Democrats	Stephen Gower	317		
Green	Hidir Yildirim	158	10.3	N/A
Turnout		1,474	24.2	+0.8
Registered electors		6,086		
Labour hold		Swing		
Labour hold		Swing		
Labour hold		Swing		

=== Goresbrook ===
Goresbrook (3)
Party	Candidate	Votes	%	±%
Labour	Jeff Porter	847	62.0	−4.1
Labour	Matthew Huggins	842		
Labour	Alan Thomas	778		
Liberal Democrats	Kelly Gill	520	38.0	+4.1
Liberal Democrats	William Gill	509		
Turnout		1,443	20.3	−4.2
Registered electors		7,107		
Labour hold		Swing		
Labour hold		Swing		
Labour win (new seat)				

=== Heath ===
Heath (3)
Party	Candidate	Votes	%	±%
Labour	Charles Fairbrass	966	57.6	+11.4
Labour	Bryan Osborn	918		
Labour	Sidney Kallar	904		
Conservative	George Woodward	362	21.6	+5.7
Liberal Democrats	Benjamin Whyte	349	20.8	+5.7
Liberal Democrats	Antony Stepton	328		
Turnout		1,514	21.8	−1.9
Registered electors		6,951		
Labour hold		Swing		
Labour hold		Swing		
Labour hold		Swing		

=== Longbridge ===
Longbridge (3)
Party	Candidate	Votes	%	±%
Labour	Sue Bramley	869	42.2	−15.5
Labour	Madeleine Baker	852		
Conservative	Brian Cook	811	39.4	N/A
Labour	Nirmal Gill	774		
Conservative	Anton Clark	757		
Conservative	Paul Cocklind	741		
Liberal Democrats	Lea Harding	379	18.4	−23.9
Liberal Democrats	Hazel Price	352		
Liberal Democrats	Shirley Felton	334		
Turnout		2,115	29.6	−0.6
Registered electors		7,153		
Labour hold		Swing		
Labour hold		Swing		
Conservative gain from Labour		Swing		

=== Mayesbrook ===
Mayesbrook (3)
Party	Candidate	Votes	%	±%
Labour	Jean Blake	648	52.4	N/A
Labour	Dee Hunt	619		
Labour	June Conyard	605		
Liberal Democrats	John Dias-Broughton	589	47.6	N/A
Liberal Democrats	Raymond Little	589		
Liberal Democrats	Jonathon Lopez-Real	533		
Turnout		1,383	20.8	N/A
Registered electors		6,655		
Labour win (new seat)				
Labour win (new seat)				
Labour win (new seat)				

=== Parsloes ===
Parsloes (3)
Party	Candidate	Votes	%	±%
Labour	Frederick Jones	775	62.7	−14.5
Labour	Herbert Collins	758		
Labour	Dennis O’Brien	647		
Liberal Democrats	Winifred Chapman	462	37.3	+14.5
Liberal Democrats	Tony Perry	446		
Turnout		1,295	19.9	−3.6
Registered electors		6,495		
Labour hold		Swing		
Labour hold		Swing		
Labour win (new seat)				

=== River ===
River (3)
Party	Candidate	Votes	%	±%
Labour	Liam Smith	1,018	69.4	−6.5
Labour	Patricia Twomey	987		
Labour	Inder Jamu	827		
Liberal Democrats	Rosemary McCulloch	449	30.6	+6.5
Turnout		1,462	20.4	−0.3
Registered electors		7,160		
Labour hold		Swing		
Labour hold		Swing		
Labour win (new seat)				

=== Thames ===
Thames (3)
Party	Candidate	Votes	%	±%
Labour	Fred Barns	980	67.6	−4.9
Labour	Joan Rawlinson	947		
Labour	David Miles	940		
Liberal Democrats	Juan Dias-Broughton	321	22.2	+16.8
Liberal Democrats	Mardell Dias	293		
Liberal Democrats	Lisa Dias-Broughton	293		
Green	Francis Koch-Krause	148	10.2	N/A
Turnout		1,457	23.7	−7.1
Registered electors		6,144		
Labour hold		Swing		
Labour hold		Swing		
Labour win (new seat)				

=== Valence ===
Valence (3)
Party	Candidate	Votes	%	±%
Labour	Vera Cridland	897	67.6	−7.0
Labour	Jean Bruce	811		
Labour	Catherine Osborne	741		
Liberal Democrats	Claire Stepton	430	32.4	+7.0
Turnout		1,333	20.3	−1.9
Registered electors		6,568		
Labour hold		Swing		
Labour hold		Swing		
Labour hold		Swing		

=== Village ===
Village (3)
Party	Candidate	Votes	%	±%
Labour	Lee Waker	981	55.2	−14.9
Labour	Darrin Best	946		
Labour	Bill Dale	890		
Conservative	Neil Connelly	414	23.3	+6.2
Liberal Democrats	Frederick Tindling	383	21.5	+8.7
Turnout		1,552	22.4	−1.1
Registered electors		6,941		
Labour hold		Swing		
Labour hold		Swing		
Labour hold		Swing		

=== Whalebone ===
Whalebone (3)
Party	Candidate	Votes	%	±%
Residents	Albert Gibbs	762	41.7	N/A
Residents	John Denyer	755		
Labour	Marie West	740	40.5	N/A
Labour	Raymond Parkin	701		
Residents	Keith Woodcock	675		
Labour	Maureen Worby	667		
Conservative	Philip Grimmer	324	17.7	N/A
Conservative	Sylvia Grimmer	279		
Turnout		1,811	26.2	N/A
Registered electors		6,922		
Residents win (new seat)				
Residents win (new seat)				
Labour win (new seat)				

== By-elections between 2002 and 2006 ==
=== Longbridge ===
Longbridge by-election, 6 February 2003
Party	Candidate	Votes	%	±%
Conservative	Anton Clark	1,186	61.0	+21.6
Labour	Simon Bremner	578	29.7	−12.5
Liberal Democrats	Jonathan Lopez-Real	180	9.3	−9.1
Majority		608	31.3	N/A
Turnout			26.8	−2.8
Registered electors				
Conservative gain from Labour		Swing		

The by-election was called following the death of Cllr Susan Bramley.

=== Eastbrook ===
Eastbrook by-election, 3 April 2003
Party	Candidate	Votes	%	±%
Labour	Robert Little	847	47.5	−4.3
Labour	Raymond Parkin	839		
Conservative	Susan Connelly	778	43.6	+6.2
Conservative	Kerry Smith	768		
Liberal Democrats	Karen Perry	110	6.7	+6.7
Liberal Democrats	Tony Perry	96		
Green	Melissa Serpico	50	2.8	+2.8
Green	Francis Koch-Krase	43		
Majority		69	3.9	N/A
Turnout			24.3	−1.3
Registered electors				
Labour hold		Swing		
Labour hold		Swing		

The by-election was called following the death of Cllr Lawrence Bunn and the resignation of Cllr Sidney Summerfield.

=== Eastbury ===
Eastbury by-election, 4 December 2003
Party	Candidate	Votes	%	±%
Liberal Democrats	Diane Challis	470	32.9	−23.5
Labour	James McDermott	466	32.6	−11.0
Conservative	Colin King	381	26.7	+26.7
Green	Geoff Sheridan	111	7.8	+7.8
Majority		4	0.3	N/A
Turnout			19.8	−7.0
Registered electors				
Liberal Democrats hold		Swing		

The by-election was called following the death of Cllr Daniel Felton

=== Chadwell Heath ===
Chadwell Heath by-election, 10 June 2004
Party	Candidate	Votes	%	±%
Labour	Nadine Smith	965	39.4	+8.4
Conservative	Mary Justice	899	36.7	+3.2
Residents	Elaine Matthews	468	19.1	−16.5
Green	Geoff Sheridan	117	4.8	+4.8
Majority		66	2.7	N/A
Turnout			35.5	+8.8
Registered electors				
Labour gain from Residents		Swing		

The by-election was called following the death of Cllr Robert Jeyes.

=== Valence ===
Valence by-election, 15 July 2004
Party	Candidate	Votes	%	±%
Labour	Donald Hemmett	761	41.6	−26.0
BNP	Lawrence Rustem	576	31.5	+31.5
Conservative	George Woodward	279	15.3	+15.3
Liberal Democrats	Angela Lambart	148	8.1	−24.3
Green	Laurence Cleeland	65	3.6	+3.6
Majority		185	10.1	N/A
Turnout			27.8	+7.5
Registered electors				
Labour hold		Swing		

The by-election was called following the death of Cllr Vera Cridland.

=== Goresbrook ===
Goresbrook by-election, 16 September 2004
Party	Candidate	Votes	%	±%
BNP	Daniel Kelly	1,072	51.9	N/A
Labour	Patricia Northover	602	29.1	−32.9
UKIP	Terence Jones	137	6.6	N/A
Conservative	Christine Naylor	111	5.4	N/A
Liberal Democrats	Frederick Tindling	85	4.1	−33.9
Green	Geoff Sheridan	59	2.9	N/A
Majority		470	22.8	N/A
Turnout			28.8	+8.5
Registered electors				
BNP gain from Labour		Swing		

The by-election was called following the resignation of Cllr Matthew Huggins.

=== Village ===
Village by-election, 7 October 2004
Party	Candidate	Votes	%	±%
Labour	Philip Waker	1,085	44.7	−10.5
BNP	Lawrence Rustem	934	38.5	+38.5
Conservative	Kerry Smith	410	16.9	−6.4
Majority		151	6.2	N/A
Turnout			35.0	+12.6
Registered electors				
Labour hold		Swing		

The by-election was called following the death of Cllr Darrin Best.

=== Becontree ===
Becontree by-election, 14 July 2005
Party	Candidate	Votes	%	±%
Labour	Alok Agrawal	1,171	59.8	−6.0
BNP	John Luisis	378	19.3	+19.3
Conservative	Anthony Chytry	283	14.4	+14.4
UKIP	John Bolton	125	6.4	+6.4
Majority		793	40.5	N/A
Turnout			25.9	+8.9
Registered electors				
Labour hold		Swing		

The by-election was called following the death of Cllr John Wainwright.

=== Goresbrook ===
Goresbrook by-election, 23 July 2005
Party	Candidate	Votes	%	±%
Labour	Warren Northover	1,227	51.0	+22.0
BNP	Lawrence Rustem	791	32.9	−19.0
UKIP	Kerry Smith	216	9.0	+2.4
Conservative	Christine Naylor	167	7.0	+1.6
Majority		436	17.1	N/A
Turnout			33.6	+13.3
Registered electors				
Labour gain from BNP		Swing		

The by-election was called following the resignation of Cllr Daniel Kelly.
