= Governance of Greater London (1986–2000) =

Governance of London without London-wide local government

The Greater London Council was abolished in 1986 leaving Greater London without a strategic local government authority until the establishment of the Greater London Authority fourteen years later in 2000.

== Fractured governance ==
In 1988, Michael Hebbert and Tony Travers reported that there were around 100 bodies delivering services in Greater London. In 1993, there were 272 organisations in London and of their 1,675 appointed members, very few were drawn from the 1,975 elected London borough councillors. They were spending a total budget of £6 billion.

In terms of strategic regional planning, RPG 3 (published by the government) replaced the Greater London Development Plan (published by the GLC).

=== List of bodies ===
In the absence of a London wide strategic authority, a number of joint committees, joint boards and quangos were established including the:

Body	Type	Notes	References
Association of London Government	London nominated body	Established in 1995 as a merger of the London Boroughs Association and the Association of London Authorities.	
Government Office for London	Central government office	Established in 1994.	
Greater London Arts Association	Central government appointed body	Established in 1966.	
Inner London Education Authority	Directly elected single-purpose body	Replaced a GLC committee in 1986. Abolished in 1990 and transferred to Inner London borough councils.	
London Boroughs Grants Committee	London nominated body	Established in 1986.	
London Ecology Committee	London nominated body	Established in 1986.	
London Fire and Civil Defence Authority	London nominated body	Established in 1986.	
London Pensions Fund Authority	Single-purpose body took over pensions from the London Residuary Body.	Established in 1990.	
London Planning Advisory Committee	London nominated body	Established in 1986.	
London Regional Transport	Central government appointed body	Established in 1984.	
London Research Centre	London nominated body	Established in 1986.	
London Residuary Body	Central government appointed body	Established in 1986.	
London Waste Regulation Authority	London nominated body	Established in 1986.	
Metropolitan Police Committee	Central government appointed body	Established in 1995.	
Minister for London	Government minister	Established in 1994. Inaugural minister was John Gummer.	
Minister for Transport in London	Government minister	Established in 1992. Inaugural minister was Steve Norris.	
East London Waste Authority	London nominated body	Established in 1986.	
North London Waste Authority	London nominated body	Established in 1986.	
West London Waste Authority	London nominated body	Established in 1986.	
Western Riverside Waste Authority	London nominated body	Established in 1986.	

== See also ==
- Minister for London
- History of local government in London
- Local Government Act 1985
- Symbols of Greater London
