= Environment of London =

The environment of the London consists of different aspects including biodiversity, climate, geology and animal welfare.

== Biodiversity ==
The first draft of the Greater London Authority biodiversity strategy was published in September 2001.

According to the Greater London Authority, in London, there are over 14,000 distinct species of plants, animal and fungi recorded.

Several species have become extinct in London due to habitat loss, poor management, pollution and the impact of foreign and invasive species.

== Municipal waste management ==
The first Greater London Authority municipal waste management strategy was published in September 2003.

Until 1986, waste disposal was a responsibility of the Greater London Council. Upon the abolition of the Greater London Council in 1986, waste disposal became a responsibility of the London boroughs and the City of London. In some cases, this is managed by joint committees of these local authorities.

The London Waste and Recycling Board was established in 2008, under the Greater London Authority Act 2007.

== Air quality ==
In December 1952, there was a severe air pollution event in London, known as the Great Smog.

The first Greater London Authority air quality strategy was published in February 2001, targeting the pollution from road vehicles.

The London Air Quality Network, part of Imperial College London, was founded in 1993, with the goal of coordinating the monitoring of air pollution. The network began collecting data on air quality in 2000.

Between the introduction of the congestion charge in 2003 and 2008, there was a significant reduction in air pollution in London. In the 5 years after the introduction of the London low emission zone, there was an average of a 13% reduction in PM10. Between the expansion of ULEZ in 2023 and 2025, PM2.5 from vehicle exhausts reduced by 31%, nitrogen dioxide reduced by 27% compared to what they would have been without the exxpansion ULEZ.

During the COVID-19 pandemic, air pollution fell to the lowest level since 2000.

In 2022, the air quality for the average London Underground line with 2.6 μg/m^{3} PM2.5 is worse than for a background site in London, with 0.3 μg/m^{3} PM2.5.

The proposed expansion of Heathrow has been criticised as potentially leading to an reduction in air quality.

== Water quality ==
London tap water contains a high level of chemicals such as PFOA and PFAS.

In March 2026, the first bathing site on the River Thames was designated at Ham In south west London. It was later found to have significant amounts of blue-green algae.

Thames Water recorded 464 pollution incidents in 2025, making it one of the water companies in England and Wales with the highest number of pollution incidents that year.

== Ambient noise ==
The firs draft of the Greater London Authority ambient noise strategy was published in 2003.

According to the charity Possible, the areas with greatest noise intensity are those near major roads such as the M25.

The proposed expansion of Heathrow has been criticised as potentially leading to an increase in noise pollution.

== Climate and climate change ==
According to the Environment Agency, the southeast of England (containing London), is one of the driest regions in the United Kingdom. London experiences up to 10% more in cloud cover each year, compared to its surrounding areas.

In London, 70% of carbon emissions come from existing workplaces' buildings.

The first Greater London Authority climate change adaptation strategy was published in 2008. The first climate change mitigation and energy strategy was published in 2010.

In 2021,Sadiq Khan, as Mayor of London, set a goal of reaching net zero emissions by 2030. In May 2026, he admitted that it would not be possible to meet the goal.

The Mayor of London, Sadiq Khan agreed to install air conditioning in all of London buses by the end of May 2027. Previously, most London buses were fitted with air-flow cooling systems rather than air conditioning.

== Urban green space ==
Approximately 47% of the land area of London is covered by green space. Several areas in London are common land, in some cases the land is governed by legislation passed in the 1800s, or became common land in the Roman era.

In 2017, Sadiq Khan announced the £9,000,000 Greener City Fund for London, supporting local groups to maintain green community areas and plant neighbourhood trees.

According to the Greater London Authority, there were 20,000 allotments within London in 2006. Since then, there has been a sharp increase in the rate at which allotments are being lost.

The London People's Assembly on Food, Nature and the Right to Grow has called for Greater London Authority to introduce a single scheme for individuals across London to turn unused public land into food gardens and allotments.

== Littering and fly-tipping ==
The enforcement of fixed penalty notices for littering and fly-tipping is managed by individual London boroughs and the of the City of London Corporation.

In 2023-2024, the London borough with the highest incidence of fly-tipping was Camden, with 157.5 incidents per 1000 residents in comparison to 50 incidents per 1000 residents for London overall.

== Green rooftops and vertical gardens ==
The first bus stop shelter with a green roof was installed in Cricklewood, by the London Borough Council of Barnet.

Sky Garden sits on top of 20 Fenchurch Street. The "living wall" at 20 Fenchurch Street is over 700 m^{2} in size.

== Urban heat island effect ==
In cities, the air, surface and soil temperatures are higher than their respective equivalents in rural areas, under what is known as the urban heat island. According to a report by Arup, the most severe location in London for the urban heat island effect is Kilburn and South Hampstead and the least severe location in London is Regent's Park.

== Animal welfare ==
Whitehall previously hosted a cockfighting arena, called the Royal Cockpit.

Horse-drawn vehicles had been used for private hire since medieval times. By 1634, the first horse-drawn carriages had begun to ply for hire.

Between 2000 and 2008, there was a dispute between the Mayor of London, Ken Livingstone, and campaigners who were advocating for feeding pigeons in Trafalgar Square. In 2001, the last seller of pigeon feed reached an agreement with Livingstone to stop selling feed. In 2003, Livingstone banned feeding pigeons, but around that time Westminster City Council was paying for a pigeon feed seller who had been working in the square for a significant amount of time. In 2006, Livingstone hired a pair of harris's hawks to fly over Trafalgar Square to distract the pigeons.

Many areas of London have had feral cat colonies. There was a sharp increase in the number of cat rescues in the years after the pandemic.

Th release of fireworks at home on Bonfire Night has been criticised by the London Fire Brigade and the RSPCA as having a negative impact on animal welfare.

== Historic environment ==
After the passage of the Ancient Monuments and Archaeological Areas Act 1979, different London borough councils began operating archaeological units as part of their planning processes, with some of these being joint services serving multiple boroughs. The Greater London Council first established the Department of Greater London Archaeology in 1982, merging these archaeological units.

Unexpectedly, Shakespeare's The Rose was discovered on a development site in 1989. This led to the publication of Planning Policy Guidance 16: Archaeology and Planning, national guidance published by the UK government on the treatment of archaeology in planning.

== Geology ==
Approximately, 80% of the landmass of London sits on clay.

The London basin is the natural river catchment for London in the 21st century.

== Governance ==
=== Protected areas ===
There are 142 local nature reserves in London. Lea Valley Park is a 10,000 acre park, established in 1966, spanning north east London, Essex and Hertfordshire – it is the largest park in London.

There are 1,300 sites of importance for nature conservation in London and 36 of sites of special scientific interest in London.

The Metropolitan Green Belt is a statutory green belt, designated originally under the Green Belt (London and Home Counties) Act 1938.

The 1976 Greater London Development Plan introduced a designation of "Metropolitan open land". The term continued to be used by the London Planning Advisory Committee and was used in regional planning guidance for London (RPG3) in the 1990s. The London Plan continues to use the designation.

=== History before 2000 ===
Before 1982, there was no mention of ecology, wildlife or nature in Greater London Council policy.

In 1982, the Greater London Council hired its first senior ecologist, in charge of its ecology section. The GLC adopted policies on nature conservation, promoting advice on habitat management, by developing a data-gathering project on wildlife in London through the London Wildlife Trust. This work was carried on by the London Ecology Unit, upon the disestablishment of the Greater London Council in 1986. The London Ecology Unit became part of the Greater London Authority in 2000, upon its establishment.

=== Greater London Authority strategies ===
The Greater London Authority became responsible for publishing separate statutory strategies on biodiversity, municipal waste management, air quality, ambient noise, under the Greater London Authority Act 1999. The Greater London Authority became responsible for the publication of a climate change mitigation and energy strategy and a climate change adaptation strategy under the `. These were replaced by a single environment strategy under the Localism Act 2011.

Under the Environment Act 2021, the Greater London Authority became responsible for the publication of a local nature recovery strategy.
