= London Fire and Civil Defence Authority =

Former fire authority in England

- Abbreviation: LFCDA
- Predecessor: Greater London Council
- Successor: London Fire and Emergency Planning Authority
- Formation: 1 April 1986
- Founder: Local Government Act 1985
- Dissolved: 3 July 2000
- Type: Fire authority
- Headquarters: London Fire Brigade
- Location: Queen Annes Gate, London, SW1H 9AT
- Region served: Greater London
- Field: London Fire Brigade strategy, policy and budget
- Members: 33 members

London Fire and Civil Defence Authority (LFCDA) was the fire authority of Greater London from 1 April 1986 to 3 July 2000. It replaced the Greater London Council as fire authority when it was abolished. The LFCDA was replaced by the London Fire and Emergency Planning Authority when the Greater London Authority was created.

== History ==
The LFCDA was established on 1 April 1986 to replace the Greater London Council as fire authority for Greater London. It was a joint authority, made up of 33 members, one appointed by each of the 32 London borough councils and one from the Corporation of London.

The London Fire Brigade ceased to be able to use the coat of arms of Greater London once the Greater London Council was abolished. The London Fire and Civil Defence Authority applied in 1986 to the College of Arms for the coat of arms to be transferred to them, but this was refused and a new coat of arms was issued. (Note: These were subsequently transferred to the London Fire and Emergency Planning Authority and the London Fire Commissioner.)

The LFCDA was replaced by the London Fire and Emergency Planning Authority, a functional body of the Greater London Authority.

== Work ==
The LFCDA devolved significantly responsibility to five area commanders.

== See also ==
- Governance of Greater London (1986–2000)

== Notes ==
Preceded by Greater London Council	London fire authority 1986–2000	Succeeded by London Fire and Emergency Planning Authority
