= Waste disposal in London =

Greater London has a number of waste disposal authorities, responsible for waste collection and disposal. Prior to the abolition of the Greater London Council in 1986, it was the waste authority for Greater London.

== Waste disposal authorities ==
In London, waste disposal authorities are local authorities or joint committees of boroughs.

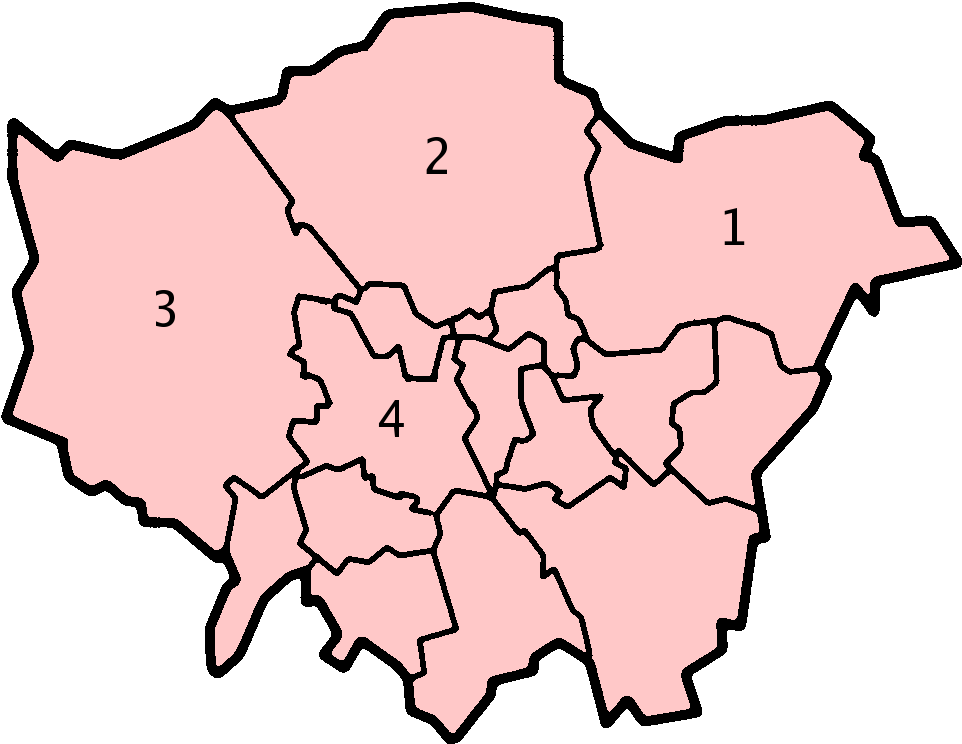
There are four statutory joint waste authorities, as follows: 1. East London - Barking and Dagenham, Havering, Newham and Redbridge; 2. North London - Barnet, Camden, Enfield, Islington, Hackney, Haringey, Waltham Forest; 3. West London - Brent, Ealing, Harrow, Hillingdon, Hounslow, Richmond; 4. Western Riverside - Hammersmith and Fulham, Kensington and Chelsea, Lambeth, Wandsworth.

The joint authorities are made up of councillors nominated from the borough councils. They are funded by a levy on the local authorities.

The other boroughs—that is to say the City of Westminster and the City of London along with Bexley, Bromley, Croydon, Greenwich, Kingston upon Thames, Lewisham, Merton, Southwark, Sutton and Tower Hamlets—are independent waste authorities in their own right.

The government calculates a "recycling rate" which is defined as the percentage of waste collected that is sent for reuse, recycling or composting.

Waste disposal authority	Type	Description
East London Waste Authority	Statutory joint committees	East London Waste Authority has conducted public awareness campaigns concerning battery fires and proper battery disposal.
North London Waste Authority	Statutory joint committees	North London Waste Authority owns the Edmonton EcoPark.
West London Waste Authority	Statutory joint committees	Waste London Waste Authority contracts Cory Riverside Energy, which owns a plant in Wandsworth.
Western Riverside Waste Authority	Statutory joint committees	In 2007, Western Riverside Waste Authority reduced by 4.3%. Western Riverside Waste Authority incinerated 79% of all its waste, in 2019.
South London Waste Partnership	Voluntary joint committee	Beddington incinerator is shared by the South London Waste Partnership – it exceeded air pollution limits on 916 occasions between 2022 and 2024.
City of Westminster	Local authority	In 2007, Westminster reduced its waste by 1.4%.
City of London	Local authority	The City of London contracted Veolia to manage its waste in 2019.
Bexley	Local authority	
Bromley	Local authority	In 2026, Bromley was the only borough in London with a recycling rate above 50%.
Greenwich	Local authority	In 2016, Greenwich rejected approximately 14.4% of recyclable waste.
Lewisham	Local authority	
Southwark	Local authority	Southwark was the inner London borough with the highest recycling rate in 2018.
Tower Hamlets	Local authority	Tower Hamlets has the lowest recycling rate out of all local authrorities in England: in 2026, this was 15.8%.

The four boroughs of Croydon, Kingston, Merton and Sutton work together in a voluntary capacity as the South London Waste Partnership.

== Greater London Authority ==
=== Environment strategy ===
Originally, the Greater London Authority was responsible for the publication of a municipal waste strategy under the Greater London Authority Act 1999.

Subsequently this was consolidated with other statutory strategies into a single environment strategy by the Localism Act 2011.

=== London Waste and Recycling Board ===
Ken Livingstone, as Mayor of London, made repeated attempts to bring the different waste authorities together, to form a single waste authority in London. This faced significant opposition from existing authorities due to concerns that it would slow down uptake of recycling.

A proposal for a single waste authority was included in the government's 2005 review of the GLA's powers. Subsequently, the Greater London Authority Act 2007 did not establish a single waste authority, but did establish the London Waste and Recycling Board, which was not a waste authority. The LWRB first met in 2008 and delivered a significant number of new facilities. The LWRB does not set rules concerning what can be recycled, but it can fund projects.

== See also ==
- Mucking Marshes Landfill
