= RPG 3 =

Document produced by the UK Government

Regional Planning Guidance 3: Strategic Guidance for London Planning Authorities commonly abbreviated as RPG 3, was regional planning guidance produced by the UK Government to advise London local planning authorities.

== Background ==
In March 1994, London Planning Advisory Committee had submitted advice to the Secretary of State for the Environment. The guidance was published in draft form in May 1995.

In November 1996, the guidance was published in its final form by John Gummer, as the Secretary of State for the Environment and the Minister for London.

Addendums to the guidance were published by the Department for the Environment in February 1997 and the Department of the Environment, Transport and the Regions in 1999.

== Contents ==
The guidance was designed to complement the government's transport strategy for London.

The guidance included emphasis of:

- the enhancement of Metropolitan open land and the Metropolitan Green Belt.
- the protection of the River Thames and other areas of cultural and historical significance

The 1997 addendum provided additional strategic planning guidance was provided by the Government for the River Thames.

The 1999 addendum described ten "view corridors" focused on St Paul’s Cathedral and the Palace of Westminster - with each one being defined as an area where tall buildings, such as skyscrapers, which could not to be built.

== Replacement ==
In 1998, the Government published a white paper containing proposals for replacing the guidance. Subsequently, the guidance was replaced by the London Plan.
