= Greater London Authority =

English strategic regional authority

- Coat of arms

- Wordmark

Type
- Type: Devolved strategic governance body of London
- Term limits: None

History
- Founded: 3 July 2000
- Preceded by: Greater London Council (1965–1986)

Leadership

Executive
- Mayor of London: Sadiq Khan, Labour since 9 May 2016
- Statutory Deputy Mayor: Joanne McCartney, Labour since 9 May 2016
- Mayoral Cabinet: since 9th May 2016

London Assembly
- Chair: Andrew Boff, Independent since 11 May 2026
- Deputy Chair: Len Duvall, Labour since 11 May 2026
- Mayoral group leader: Len Duvall, Labour since 9 May 2016

Paid Service
- Chief Officer: Mary Harpley since 29 May 2018

Structure
- Seats: 1 mayor and 25 assembly members (AMs)
- Length of term: Four years

Elections
- Mayor of London voting system: Supplementary vote
- London Assembly voting system: Additional member
- Last Mayor of London election: 2 May 2024
- Last London Assembly election: 2 May 2024
- Next Mayor of London election: 4 May 2028
- Next London Assembly election: 4 May 2028

Meeting place
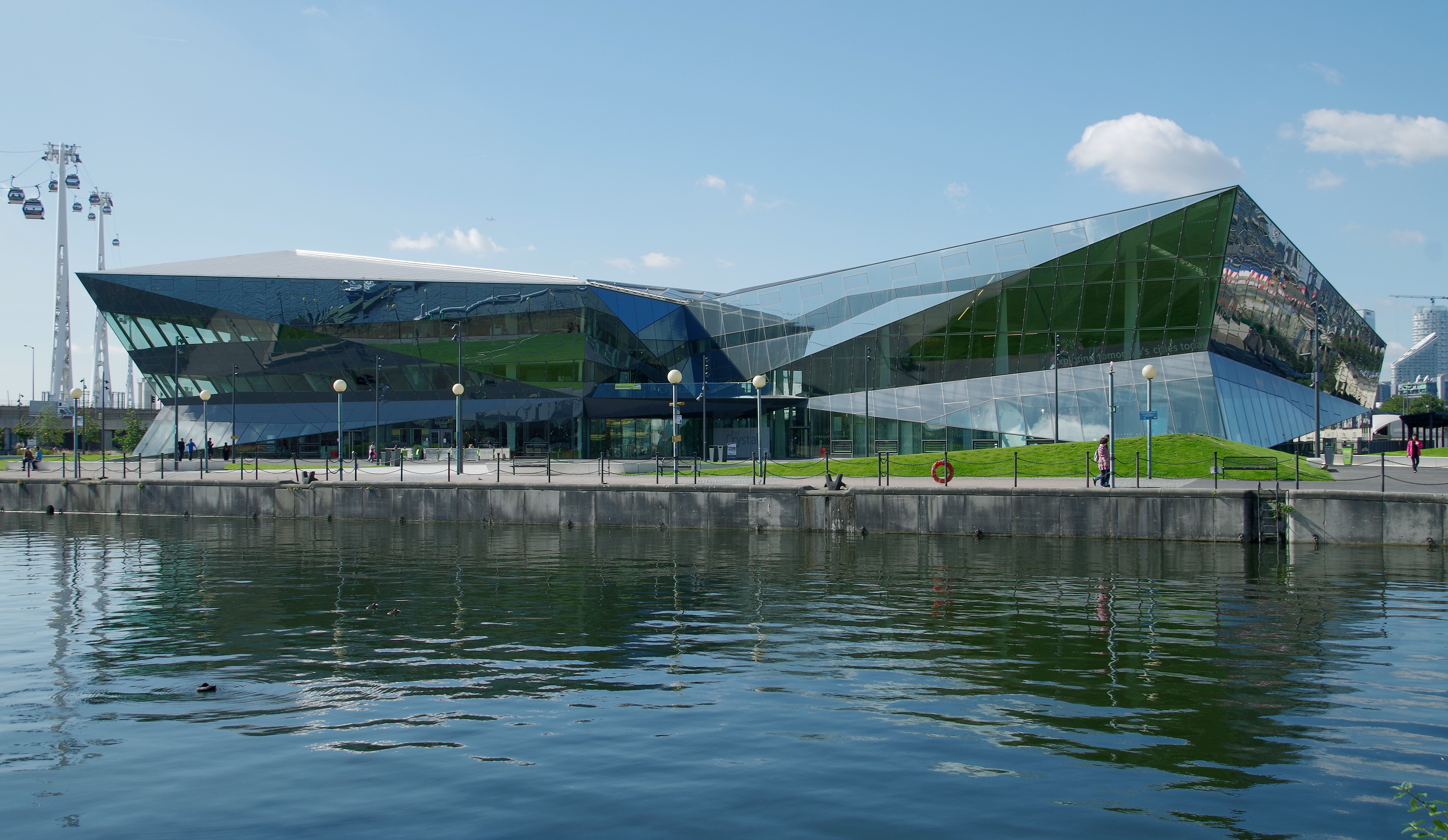
- City Hall, Kamal Chunchie Way, London, E16 1ZE

Website
- london.gov.uk

The Greater London Authority (GLA), colloquially known by the metonym City Hall, is the devolved regional governance body of Greater London, in the United Kingdom. It consists of two political branches: an executive Mayor (currently Sadiq Khan) and the 25-member London Assembly, which serves as a means of checks and balances on the Mayor. The authority was established in 2000, following a local referendum, and derives most of its powers from the Greater London Authority Act 1999 and the Greater London Authority Act 2007.

It is a strategic regional authority, with powers over transport, policing, economic development, and fire and emergency planning. Three functional bodies – Transport for London, the Mayor's Office for Policing and Crime, and the London Fire Commissioner – are responsible for delivery of services in these areas. The planning policies of the Mayor of London are detailed in a statutory London Plan and the licensing policies are detailed in a London Strategic Licensing Policy - these are regularly updated and published.

The Greater London Authority is mostly funded by direct government grant and it is also a precepting authority, with some money collected with local Council Tax. The GLA is unique in the British devolved and local government system, in terms of structure (it uses a presidential system-esque model), elections and selection of powers. The authority was established to replace a range of joint boards and quangos and provided an elected upper tier of local government in Greater London for the first time since the abolition of the Greater London Council in 1986.

Since May 2016, both branches have been under the control of the London Labour Party.

The GLA is different from the corporation of the City of London with its largely ceremonial lord mayors, which controls only the square mile of the city, London's chief financial centre.

== Purpose ==
The GLA is responsible for the strategic administration of the 1,579 km^{2} (610 sq mi) of Greater London. It shares local government powers with the councils of 32 London boroughs and the City of London Corporation. It was created to improve the co-ordination between the local authorities in Greater London, while the Mayor of London's role is to provide a single representative for the capital. The Mayor proposes policy and the GLA's budget, and makes appointments to the capital's strategic executive such as Transport for London.

The statutory core purposes of the GLA are: economic development and wealth creation; promoting social development; and the improvement of the environment.

The London Assembly scrutinises the mayor. The assembly must also accept or amend the mayor's budget on an annual basis.

The GLA is based at City Hall in the London Borough of Newham, situated next to the redeveloped Royal Victoria Dock in Canning Town. The GLA moved to this building from the previous City Hall, in Southwark, in January 2022.

== History ==
=== Background ===
In 1986, the Greater London Council was abolished by the Conservative government of Margaret Thatcher. Many people have surmised that the decision to abolish the GLC was made because of the existence of a high-spending left-wing Labour administration under Ken Livingstone, although pressure for the abolition of the GLC had arisen before Livingstone took over, and was largely driven by the belief among the outer London borough councils that they could perform the functions of the GLC just as well.

On abolition, the strategic functions of the GLC were transferred to bodies controlled by central government or joint boards nominated by the London borough councils. Some of the service delivery functions were transferred down to the councils themselves. For the next 14 years there was no single elected body for the whole of London. The Labour Party never supported the abolition of the GLC and made it a policy to re-establish some form of citywide elected authority.

=== Creation ===
The Labour Party advocated a government structure comprising a single, directly elected mayor (a policy first suggested by Tony Banks in 1990), together with an elected deliberative assembly to scrutinise them. This model was based on the mayor–council government of many American and Canadian cities rather than the parliamentary-style GLC. Indeed, it was partly aimed at making sure the new body resembled the erstwhile GLC as little as possible. After Labour won the 1997 general election, the policy was outlined in a white paper entitled A Mayor and Assembly for London (March 1998).

Simultaneously with the elections to the London Borough councils, a referendum was held on the establishment of the GLA in May 1998, which was approved with 72% of the vote. The Greater London Authority Act 1999 passed through Parliament, receiving royal assent in October 1999. Most polling showed that Livingstone, the last leader of the GLC, would easily win the mayoral election. However, in a controversial election campaign, the then prime minister, Tony Blair, attempted to block the nomination of Livingstone, a factional rival, and imposed his own candidate. In reaction, Livingstone stood as an independent candidate, resulting in his expulsion from the Labour Party. He won the May 2000 election, pushing Labour's candidate into third place and becoming the first directly elected politician in the United Kingdom. Following an interim period in which the mayor and assembly had been elected but had no powers, the GLA was formally established on 3 July 2000.

When it was originally established, the GLA's statutory strategies included:

- transport
- London Development Agency (economic development and regeneration)
- biodiversity
- municipal waste management
- air quality
- ambient noise
- culture

The original functional bodies were: Transport for London, the London Development Agency, the Metropolitan Police Authority and the London Fire and Emergency Planning Authority.

=== Further powers and reforms ===
In November 2005, the government published a consultation document reviewing the powers of the GLA, making proposals for additional powers, including waste management, planning, housing, and learning and skills. The result of the consultation and final proposals were published by the Department for Communities and Local Government on 13 July 2006. This led to the Greater London Authority Act 2007, which devolved further powers to the Greater London Authority, specifically including strategic planning and the establishment of a health inequalities strategy.

Other legislation has further reformed or enabled the further reform of the GLA.

- The Railways and Transport Safety Act 2003 enabled the transfer of London Regional Transport to Transport for London.
- The Serious Organised Crime and Police Act 2005 transferred responsibility for policing the Royal Parks to the Metropolitan Police.
- The Localism Act 2011 made a number of changes to the GLA:
  - abolishing the London Development Agency, transferring its functions to the GLA
  - enabling the GLA to publish a statutory economic development strategy as a consequence of the abolition of the London Development Agency.
  - transferring land acquisition and social housing powers of the Homes and Communities Agency for London
  - replacing five separate statutory strategies with a single statutory environment strategy
  - enabling the GLA to establish mayoral development corporations for specific areas
  - enabling the London Assembly to reject statutory strategies with a two-thirds majority
- The Police Reform and Social Responsibility Act 2011 replaced the Metropolitan Police Authority with the Mayor's Office for Policing and Crime.
- Secondary legislation under the Deregulation and Contracting Out Act 1994 transferred responsibility for the Royal Parks from the Royal Parks Agency to The Royal Parks Limited, allowing the Mayor of London to appoint some of its trustees, but not the chair.
- The Policing and Crime Act 2017 replaced the London Fire and Emergency Planning Authority with the London Fire Commissioner.
- The Pedicabs (London) Act 2024 enabled TfL to establish a regulatory framework for pedicabs.
- The English Devolution and Community Empowerment Act 2026 made a number of changes to the GLA:
  - enabled the GLA to publish a London Strategic Licensing Policy
  - enabled TfL to establish a regulatory framework for shared micromobility vehicle schemes
  - required the GLA to establish an audit committee

In 2025, the Greater London Authority received an integrated settlement with the government, meaning that its grant from the government had fewer conditions attached.

== Headquarters ==
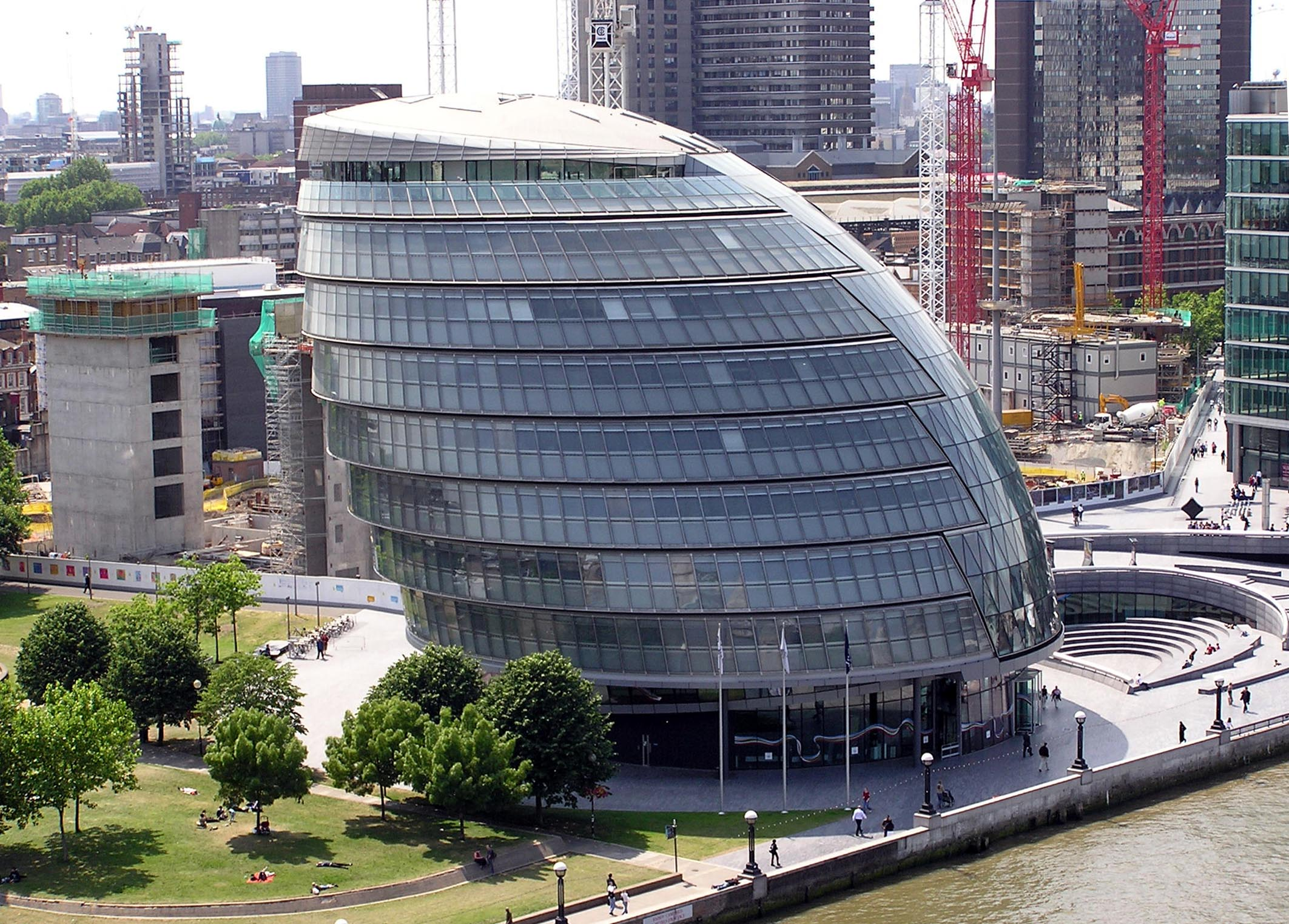
City Hall in Southwark served as the headquarters of the Greater London Authority between July 2002 and December 2021.

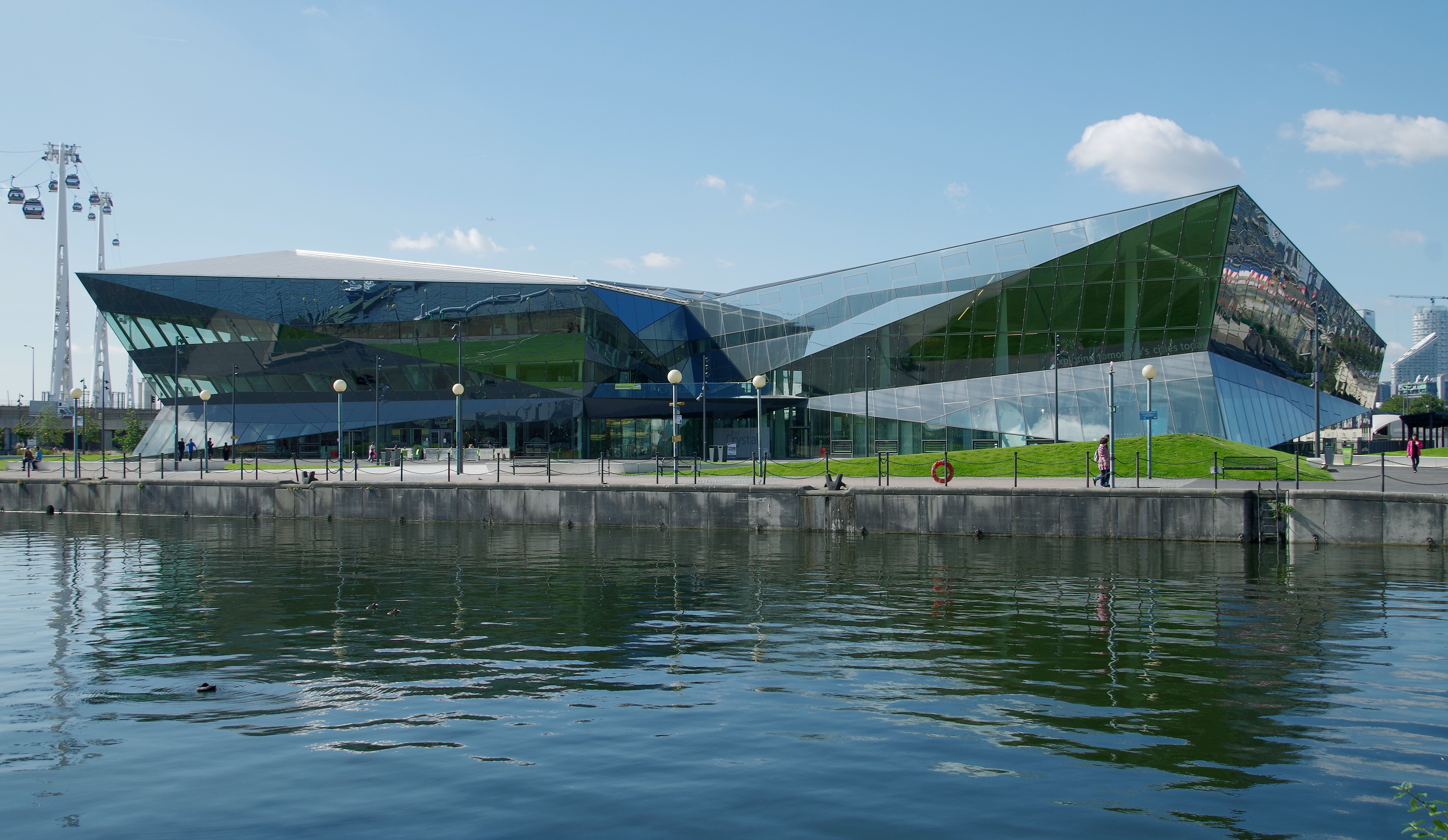
City Hall in Newham; the current headquarters for the GLA since 2022.

For the first two years of its existence, the Greater London Authority was based at Romney House, 47 Marsham Street in Westminster. The inaugural meeting of the London Assembly took place at Emmanuel Centre, also on Marsham Street.

Between July 2002 and December 2021, the Greater London Authority was based at a building known as City Hall in Southwark, on the banks of the River Thames, close to Tower Bridge. City Hall was designed by Norman Foster and constructed at a cost of £43 million on a site formerly occupied by wharves serving the Pool of London. This building did not belong to the GLA but was leased under a 25-year rental agreement from the Kuwait Investment Authority.

In November 2020, Mayor of London Sadiq Khan announced plans to vacate City Hall at the end of 2021 and relocate to The Crystal in the Canning Town area of East London. The Crystal building is owned by the Greater London Authority and is currently under-occupied. City Hall was not owned by the authority itself and the proposed move would save the Greater London Authority £12.6 million a year in rental costs. The decision was confirmed on 3 November 2020. Newham Borough Council gave permission for a change of use for the building in December 2020. The authority vacated City Hall on 2 December 2021. The Crystal was renamed "City Hall" in December 2021.

In addition to City Hall, staff of the Greater London Authority are also based at Palestra House on Blackfriars Road and at the London Fire Brigade headquarters on Union Street, both in Southwark.

The predecessors of the Greater London Authority, the Greater London Council and the London County Council, had their headquarters at County Hall, upstream on the South Bank. Although County Hall's old council chamber is still intact, the building is unavailable for use by the GLA because of its conversion into, among other things, a luxury hotel, amusement arcade and aquarium.

== Powers and functions ==
=== Functional bodies ===
Areas which the GLA has responsibility for include transport, policing, fire and rescue, development and strategic planning. The GLA does not directly provide any services itself. Instead, its work is carried out by functional bodies which, together with the GLA itself, form the GLA Group and work under the policy direction of the mayor and assembly. These functional bodies are:

- Transport for London (TfL) – Responsible for managing most aspects of London's transport system, including public transport, main roads, and traffic management, and administering the London congestion charge.
- The Mayor's Office for Policing and Crime (MOPAC) – Responsible for overseeing the Metropolitan Police Service, which provides policing throughout Greater London. Replaced the Metropolitan Police Authority in January 2012 under the provisions of the Police Reform and Social Responsibility Act 2011.
- The London Fire Commissioner – Administers the London Fire Brigade and co-ordinates emergency planning. Until April 2017 this was the responsibility of the London Fire and Emergency Planning Authority (LFEPA).
- Mayoral development corporations:
  - London Legacy Development Corporation (LLDC),
  - Old Oak and Park Royal Development Corporation (OPDC)
  - Oxford Street Development Corporation (OSDC).

A range of back office services for the GLA and its functional bodies are provided collectively by the GLA Group using the common provision powers enabled by the 2007 act. The most senior member of staff within the GLA Group is the GLA Head of Paid Service.

=== Budget, strategies and policies ===
The Mayor of London sets the budget for the Greater London Authority group.

The Mayor of London publishes seven statutory strategies:

- transport
- economic development
- housing
- environment
- culture
- health inequalities
- spatial development (known as the London Plan) - The GLA is responsible for co-ordinating land use planning in Greater London. The mayor produces a strategic plan, the "London Plan". The individual London Borough councils are legally bound to comply with the plan. The mayor has the power to override planning decisions made by the London Boroughs if they are believed to be against the interests of London as a whole.

The assembly can amend or rejected the strategies and the budget with a two-thirds majority.

The GLA is responsible for co-ordinating premises licensing in Greater London. The mayor produces a strategic policy, the "Strategic Licensing Policy". The individual London local authorities are legally bound to comply with the policy. The mayor has the power to override licensing decisions made by the local authorities if they are believed to be against the interests of London as a whole. The powers concerning licensing broadly mirror the powers concerning planning.

Under the English Devolution and Community Empowerment Act 2026, the Mayor of London is required to publish a London Strategic Licensing Policy.

Under the Environment Act 2021, the Mayor of London is required to publish a local nature recovery strategy.

Additionally the Mayor of London publishes a number of additional non-statutory strategies including on energy, food, and surface water.

=== Intergovernmental relations ===
The Mayor of London is a member of the Mayoral Council for England and the Council of the Nations and Regions.

=== Division of functions ===
Service	Greater London Authority	London borough councils
Education		check
Housing	check	check
Planning applications		check
Strategic planning	check	check
Premises licensing	(Note: Since the English Devolution and Community Empowerment Act 2026)	check
Transport planning	check	check
Passenger transport	check	
Highways	check	check
Police	check	
Fire	check	
Social services		check
Libraries		check
Leisure and recreation		check
Waste collection		check
Waste disposal		check
Environmental health		check
Revenue collection		check

== Political control ==
After the 2024 elections, Labour has the largest representation on the GLA with the mayor as well as eleven assembly members, followed by eight from the Conservatives, three Greens, two from the Liberal Democrats, and one from Reform UK.

== Proposed reform ==
In 2008, the New Local Government Network proposed replacing the London Assembly with a" London Leaders’ Council", which would consist of the 32 elected borough council leaders.

In 2026, Re:State has proposed giving the GLA increased fiscal devolution, giving the ability for the London Assembly to pass binding laws known as "London measures", strengthening the Mayor of London's general power of competence, adopting a reserved powers model, introducing a London Constitution overseen by the London Assembly, abolishing the London Assembly constituency members and allowing certain local authorities' leaders to take their seats in the London Assembly.

Benali Hamdache, a Green Party member of the London Assembly, has called for giving the GLA powers "on the level of Wales or Scotland", in 2026. In 2024, Caroline Pigeon, a former Liberal Democrat member of the London Assembly, has called for additional checks and balances on mayoral powers.

The Centre for Cities has proposed giving the Greater London Authority additional fiscal devolution, including a tourist tax on multiple occasions.

== Elections ==
The 2000 London mayoral election and 2000 London Assembly election were conducted by the Government Office for London, with the Minister for London appointing the Greater London Returning Officer.

=== London Elects ===
Since it was founded on 10 June 2003, London Elects has been the GLA team responsible for organising the election of the Mayor of London and the London Assembly. The team provides voters with the details of their polling station. The London Elects team reports to the Greater London Returning Officer.

=== List of elections ===
	London Assembly	Mayor of London
2000	Details	Details
2004	Details	Details
2008	Details	Details
2012	Details	Details
2016	Details	Details
2021	Details	Details
2024	Details	Details

== See also ==
- History of local government in London
- Scotland Yard
- Lord Mayor of the City of London
- City of London Corporation
- London boroughs
- International relations of the Greater London Authority
