= History of local government in London =

The history of local government in London, England, spans a number of periods.

== Metropolis ==
The Municipal Corporations Act 1835 created the City of London. The City of London was unreformed by legislation covering the other major city corporations and did not expand into the growing metropolitan area surrounding it. The area that is currently Greater London was administered by parishes and hundreds in the counties of Middlesex, Essex, Kent, Surrey and Hertfordshire, with very little co-ordination between them. Special areas such as the Liberty of Westminster were exempt from county administration. In other areas ad hoc single-purpose boards are set up. Commentators consider it to be a system "in chaos".

The Metropolitan Police was created by the Metropolitan Police Act 1829. The London Fire Brigade, then known as the Metropolitan Fire Brigade, was created by the Metropolitan Fire Brigade Act 1865.

The Metropolitan Board of Works was created by the Metropolis Management Act 1855 to provide the infrastructure needed in the area now known as Inner London, its members were nominated by the vestries and boards.

The London School Board was created in 1870 through the Elementary Education Act 1870.

== County of London ==
In 1889, the County of London was created from the area of responsibility of the Metropolitan Board of Works by the Local Government Act 1888. A London County Council shared power with the boards and vestries.

The City of London is outside of its scope. Croydon and West Ham (and later East Ham) became county boroughs outside the County of London but also outside the control of the newly formed Surrey and Essex county councils. The Royal Commission on the Amalgamation of the City and County of London set out to facilitate the merger of the City and County of London. It was commissioned in 1889 and reported in 1894. Its recommendations were largely ignored.

The rest of England, including the area around the County of London and the county boroughs (but not within it), was divided into urban districts and rural districts, by the Local Government Act 1894. In the Greater London area they became consolidated over the next 70 years into municipal boroughs and urban districts with no rural districts remaining. Many districts later become populous enough to apply for county boroughs status, but are rejected.

In 1900, metropolitan boroughs were created within the County of London and functions were shared with the London County Council by the London Government Act 1899. Approximately 200 local government bodies, consisting of vestries, boards and liberties, in the area were abolished.

The London County Council took over the functions of the London School Board in 1904.

== Greater London under the Greater London Council ==
In 1965, under the London Government Act 1963, an enlarged Greater London replaced the County of London, Middlesex County Council, the county boroughs and all local government districts within around a 12-mile radius. The mostly strategic Greater London Council shared power with the 32 London boroughs and the City of London.

These reforms resulted from the Royal Commission on Local Government in Greater London which made recommendations on the governance of London.

== Greater London between 1985 and 2000 ==
The Greater London Council was abolished under the Local Government Act 1985, and the London boroughs work as unitary authorities with strategic functions organised by joint boards and quangos.

A residual Inner London Education Authority remained for Inner London, becoming a directly elected body, under the 1985 act, with its first elections in 1986, but this was abolished by the Education Reform Act 1988, with this taking effect in 1990.

== Greater London under the Greater London Authority ==
The regional Greater London Authority, consisting of the Mayor of London and the London Assembly were created by the Greater London Authority Act 1999 with the goal of strategic governance, sharing power with the London boroughs and the City of London.

== See also ==
- Local government in London
- History of local government in England
- History of London
- Symbols of Greater London

== Bibliography ==
- Barlow, IM (1991). Metropolitan Government. Routledge. ISBN 0415020999.
- Kingdom, John E (1991). Local Government and Politics in Britain. Philip Allan - Contemporary Political Studies. ISBN 0860038319.
- Redcliffe-Maud, John; Wood, Bruce (1974). The Pelican History of England. Vol. 8. Oxford University Press. ISBN 019888091X.
- Saint, Andrew, ed. (1989). Politics and the people of London: the London County Council, 1889–1965. Hambledon P. ISBN 1852850299.
- Thompson, David (1973). England in the Nineteenth Century (1815-1914). Penguin Books. ISBN 0140201971. "Vol. 8 of The Pelican History of England"
