= London Fire and Emergency Planning Authority =

Former fire authority for Greater London

- Abbreviation: LFEPA
- Predecessor: London Fire and Civil Defence Authority
- Successor: London Fire Commissioner
- Formation: 3 July 2000
- Founder: Greater London Authority Act 1999
- Dissolved: 1 April 2018
- Type: Fire authority
- Legal status: Functional body
- Purpose: Make key decisions on London Fire Brigade strategy, policy and budget
- Headquarters: London Fire Brigade
- Location: Union Street, Southwark, SE1 0LL
- Region served: London
- Members: 17 appointed members
- Chair: Val Shawcross; Brian Coleman; James Cleverly; Gareth Bacon; Fiona Twycross
- Parent organisation: Greater London Authority
- Website: www.london-fire.gov.uk/fireauthority.asp

The London Fire and Emergency Planning Authority (LFEPA) was a functional body of the Greater London Authority (GLA) from 2000 to 2018. It was established with the Greater London Authority by the Greater London Authority Act 1999. It replaced the London Fire and Civil Defence Authority, on 3 July 2000. Its principal purpose was to be the strategic governance of the London Fire Brigade. The members of LFEPA were appointed annually by the Mayor of London and were nominated from the London Assembly and the London borough councils. There were two direct mayoral appointments to the authority from 2008, following the Greater London Authority Act 2007. It was abolished in April 2018 and replaced with the London Fire Commissioner, following the Policing and Crime Act 2017.

== History ==
=== Creation ===
The London Fire and Emergency Planning Authority was created with the Greater London Authority, consisting of the Mayor of London and London Assembly, as part of the Greater London Authority Act 1999. It replaced the London Fire and Civil Defence Authority, on 3 July 2000 as the governance of the London Fire Brigade.

=== 2007 member nominations diversity dispute ===
In June 2007 the Labour Party mayor, Ken Livingstone, asked the Liberal Democrats and Conservatives to reconsider their nominations for members of the authority from the assembly and the borough councils. Livingstone said "It is unacceptable that when there are 1,861 councillors in London, of which 555 are women and 293 from black, Asian and ethnic minority groups, all seven Conservative nominees are white and include only one woman, and all three Liberal Democrat nominees are white men." A compromise was reached by 21 June 2007 whereby the mayor replaced one of the male Conservative assembly members, Bob Blackman, with Angie Bray and appointed the borough council nominations on a temporary basis until August. These appointments were extended to June 2008.

=== 2013 fire station closures dispute ===
In January 2013 the authority was asked to approve a public consultation on the closure of 12 fire stations as part of the fifth London Safety Plan. The authority voted against any future consultation on station closures, appliance reductions or job losses. The Conservative Party mayor, Boris Johnson, then used his power to directed the authority to consult the public. In February, the authority voted to ignore the direction of the mayor. The Conservative Party formed a minority on the authority and were outvoted by the Labour, Liberal Democrat and Green Party members. Advice to the authority showed that it had no legal ability to ignore the mayor's instructions. The authority voted to follow the mayoral direction on 12 September 2013. 10 fire stations closed in January 2014.

=== Replacement ===
The LFEPA was abolished in April 2018 and replaced with the London Fire Commissioner and the Fire, Resilience and Emergency Planning Committee, a new governance arrangement within the Greater London Authority.

== Members ==
The 17 members of LFEPA were appointed annually by the Mayor of London. From 2000 to 2008, nine were nominated by the London Assembly and eight by the London borough councils through their umbrella body the Association of London Government (renamed London Councils in 2006). This was amended by section 25 of the Greater London Authority Act 2007 which changed the composition to eight London Assembly nominations, seven from the London borough councils and two direct appointments by the mayor. The first appointments to the authority were made in June 2000.

== List of chairs ==
The following were appointed chair:

- Val Shawcross (2000–2008)
- Brian Coleman (2008–2012)
- James Cleverly (2012–2015)
- Gareth Bacon (2015–2017)
- Fiona Twycross (2017–2018)

== Notes ==
Preceded by London Fire and Civil Defence Authority	London fire authority 2000–2018	Succeeded by London Fire Commissioner
