= North Wales Fire and Rescue Service =

Fire and rescue service in Wales

- Gwasanaeth Tân ac Achub Gogledd Cymru (Welsh)

Operational area
- Country: Wales
- Region: North Wales
- Principal areas: 6: Anglesey; Conwy; Denbighshire; Flintshire; Gwynedd; Wrexham

Agency overview
- Established: 1996
- Chief Fire Officer: Dawn Docx

Facilities and equipment
- Stations: 44

Website
- www.nwales-fireservice.org.uk

The North Wales Fire and Rescue Service (NWFRS; Welsh: Gwasanaeth Tân ac Achub Gogledd Cymru) is the fire and rescue service covering the principal areas of Anglesey, Conwy, Denbighshire, Flintshire, Gwynedd and Wrexham in the north of Wales. With service coverage in north-west Wales being predominantly rural. The NWFRS is headquartered in St Asaph, Denbighshire, Wales.

The service was created in 1996 by the Local Government (Wales) Act 1994 which reformed Welsh local government, by a merger of the previous Clwyd and Gwynedd fire services. It covers an area of 2,400 square miles (6,200 km^{2}) with around 670,000 people. The Service employs over 1000 staff in operational and support roles.

The fire authority which administers the service is a joint board made up of councillors from Anglesey, Conwy, Denbighshire, Flintshire, Gwynedd and Wrexham councils.

== Appliances and Crewing ==
North Wales Fire and Rescue Service operates 44 Fire Stations. Bangor, Caernarfon, Colwyn Bay, Deeside, Holyhead, Llandudno, Rhyl and Wrexham are all crewed by wholetime firefighters. All stations also have a retained crew.. Within these stations are a total of 54 firefighting appliances, 1 Incident Command Unit at Rhyl, 3 Aerial Ladder Platforms at Bangor, Rhyl and Wrexham in addition to 28 other specialised response vehicles such as foam carriers and high volume pumps.

As of 2025, Porthmadog and Dolgellau are also wholetime crewed as part of a "nucleus trial", where the wholetime firefighters form a crew with the retained firefighters in that area.

The fire and rescue service operates three duty crewing systems: they are wholetime, day-crewed and an “on-call” retained duty system. Wholetime fire appliances are crewed twenty-four hours a day, seven days a week. Day-crewed appliances are crewed by wholetime firefighters based at the fire station between 8 am and 6 pm. The same firefighters then provide cover from home outside of these hours as retained firefighters. Retained firefighters are summoned to the fire station by pager from home or work to respond to emergency calls. Cross-crewing is a cost-cutting measure that sees various fire appliances being crewed by a single crew. This means, for example, if an appliance in the cross-crewing system responds to an incident, any other appliances in the system will be unavailable as they will have no crew.

== List of Fire Stations ==
NWFRS Stations
Station	Crewing	Station Callsign
Aberdyfi	Retained	WN05
Abergele	Retained	WN25
Abersoch	Retained	WN06
Amlwch	Retained	WN07
Bala	Retained	WN08
Bangor	Day Crewed + Retained	WN02
Barmouth	Retained	WN09
Beaumaris	Retained	WN10
Benllech	Retained	WN11
Betws y Coed	Retained	WN26
Blaenau Ffestiniog	Retained	WN12
Buckley	Retained	WN39
Caernarfon	Day Crewed + Retained	WN01
Cerrigydrudion	Retained	WN27
Chirk	Retained	WN40
Colwyn Bay	Day Crewed + Retained	WN23
Conwy	Retained	WN28
Corwen	Retained	WN29
Deeside	Wholetime + Retained	WN38
Denbigh	Retained	WN30
Dolgellau	Day Crewed + Retained	WN04
Flint	Retained	WN41
Harlech	Retained	WN13
Holyhead	Day Crewed + Retained	WN03
Holywell	Retained	WN42
Johnstown	Retained	WN43
Llanberis	Retained	WN14
Llandudno	Day Crewed + Retained	WN22
Llanfairfechan	Retained	WN31
Llangefni	Retained	WN15
Llangollen	Retained	WN32
Llanrwst	Retained	WN33
Menai Bridge	Retained	WN16
Mold	Retained	WN44
Nefyn	Retained (Police & Fire Station)	WN17
Porthmadog	Day Crewed + Retained	WN18
Prestatyn	Retained	WN34
Pwllheli	Retained	WN19
Rhosneigr	Retained	WN20
Rhyl	Wholetime + Retained	WN24
Ruthin	Retained	WN35
St Asaph	Retained	WN36
Tywyn	Retained	WN21
Wrexham	Wholetime + Retained	WN37

== See also ==
- List of British firefighters killed in the line of duty
- North Wales Police
