= Hereford and Worcester Fire and Rescue Service =

Fire and rescue service in western England

Operational area
- Country: England
- Counties: Herefordshire; Worcestershire

Agency overview
- Established: 1 April 1974
- Annual calls: 7,901 (2020–21)
- Employees: 228 wholetime firefighters; 379 retained firefighters; 22 Fire Control staff; 119 support staff; (2021)
- Annual budget: £35.8 million (2020–21)
- Chief Fire Officer: Jonathon Pryce

Facilities and equipment
- Divisions: 3
- Stations: 25
- Engines: 34
- Platforms: 2
- USAR: 5 modules
- Rescue boats: 3

Website
- www.hwfire.org.uk

The Hereford and Worcester Fire and Rescue Service (HWFRS) is the statutory fire and rescue service covering Herefordshire and Worcestershire in the West Midlands region of England. The service covers an area of 1,514 square miles (3,920 km^{2}), and a population of around 780,000 people.

The service was created in 1974 when The County Of Hereford Fire Brigade and The Worcester City & County Fire Brigade were merged to create The County Of Hereford and Worcester Fire Brigade. The two counties split up again in 1998 but the fire service remained, and is now run by a joint fire authority.

== Operations ==
The service's Chief Fire Officer is Jonathon Pryce, replacing Nathan Travis, who retired in March 2021.

In October 2019, HWFRS entered into a formal alliance with neighbouring Shropshire Fire and Rescue Service. The alliance covers procurement, following previous cooperation on computer systems, fire control and risk management. In June 2020, the two services announced that they were considering a single fire control centre.

HWFRS has 332 wholetime operational staff, 369 retained (part-time) staff, 21 Fire Control staff, as well as about 98 non-uniformed support staff.

Neighbouring fire services include: Gloucestershire, Warwickshire, Shropshire, Staffordshire, Mid and West Wales, South Wales and the West Midlands.

== Performance ==
Every fire and rescue service in England and Wales is periodically subjected to a statutory inspection by His Majesty's Inspectorate of Constabulary and Fire & Rescue Services (HMICFRS). The inspections investigate how well the service performs in each of three areas. On a scale of outstanding, good, requires improvement and inadequate, Herefordshire Fire and Rescue Service was rated as follows:

HMICFRS Inspection Hereford and Worcester
Area	Rating 2018/19	Rating 2021/22	Description
Effectiveness	Good	Requires improvement	How effective is the fire and rescue service at keeping people safe and secure from fire and other risks?
Efficiency	Requires improvement	Requires improvement	How efficient is the fire and rescue service at keeping people safe and secure from fire and other risks?
People	Requires improvement	Requires improvement	How well does the fire and rescue service look after its people?

== Fire stations ==
HWFRS splits its fire stations into three districts – North and South, both of which are located in Worcestershire, and West in Herefordshire.

Each fire station is crewed using one of three duty systems, or a combination:

- Wholetime – five fire stations are crewed 24 hours a day, seven days a week by full-time firefighters, working on a variety of shift patterns of two nine-hour day shifts and two 15-hour night shifts followed by four days off.
- Retained – the majority of fire stations use retained firefighters, who are on call and live or work within five minutes of the station.
- Day-crewed – three day-crewed stations are crewed for 12 hours a day by full-time firefighters working on a shift pattern of four 12-hour shifts (07:00–19:00) then four days off. The fire station is crewed by the retained firefighters at night.

As of 2021, there were 228 wholetime and 379 retained firefighters across the 25 fire stations.

== See also ==
- List of British firefighters killed in the line of duty
