= Nottinghamshire Fire and Rescue Service =

Fire Service in the UK

Operational area
- Country: England
- County: Nottinghamshire
- Address: Nottinghamshire Police and Fire and Rescue Service Joint Headquarters, Sherwood Lodge Dr, Nottingham NG5 8PP

Agency overview
- Chief Fire Officer: Craig Parkin

Facilities and equipment
- Stations: 24

Website
- www.notts-fire.gov.uk

Nottinghamshire Fire and Rescue Service is the statutory fire and rescue service covering Nottinghamshire (including the unitary authority of Nottingham) in the East Midlands of England.

The City of Nottingham Fire Brigade and the Nottinghamshire Fire Brigade were created under the Fire Services Act 1947.

In 1974, the two brigades were merged. Since 1998 when Nottingham became a separate local government area, the service has been run by a joint fire authority made up of councillors from Nottingham City Council and Nottinghamshire County Council.

== Performance ==
Every fire and rescue service in England and Wales is periodically subjected to a statutory inspection by His Majesty's Inspectorate of Constabulary and Fire & Rescue Services (HMICFRS). The inspections investigate how well the service performs in each of three areas. On a scale of outstanding, good, requires improvement and inadequate, Nottinghamshire Fire and Rescue Service was rated as follows:

HMICFRS Inspection Nottinghamshire
Area	Rating 2018/19	Rating 2021/22	Description
Effectiveness	Requires improvement	Good	How effective is the fire and rescue service at keeping people safe and secure from fire and other risks?
Efficiency	Requires improvement	Good	How efficient is the fire and rescue service at keeping people safe and secure from fire and other risks?
People	Requires improvement	Good	How well does the fire and rescue service look after its people?

== Fire stations ==
The service's headquarters and control room were located in Arnold, until relocating to a new building in 2022, achieving co-occupancy with Nottinghamshire Police in a £18.5 million building project at Burntstump Country Park.

The service development centre in Ollerton provides firefighting training, and drivers are trained to use blue lights at Highfields fire station in Beeston.

The service's fire stations are crewed by wholetime firefighters, on-call retained firefighters, or a mixture of both.

== See also ==
- List of British firefighters killed in the line of duty
