= East London Waste Authority =

Agency overview
- Formed: 1 April 1986
- Preceding agency: Greater London Council
- Jurisdiction: London boroughs of,Barking and Dagenham, Havering,Newham and Redbridge
- Headquarters: 11 Burford Road, London, E15 2ST
- Website: https://eastlondonwaste.gov.uk/

East London Waste Authority is one of the waste disposal authorities in London with responsibility for disposal of waste in the East London boroughs of Barking and Dagenham, Havering, Newham and Redbridge.

== History ==
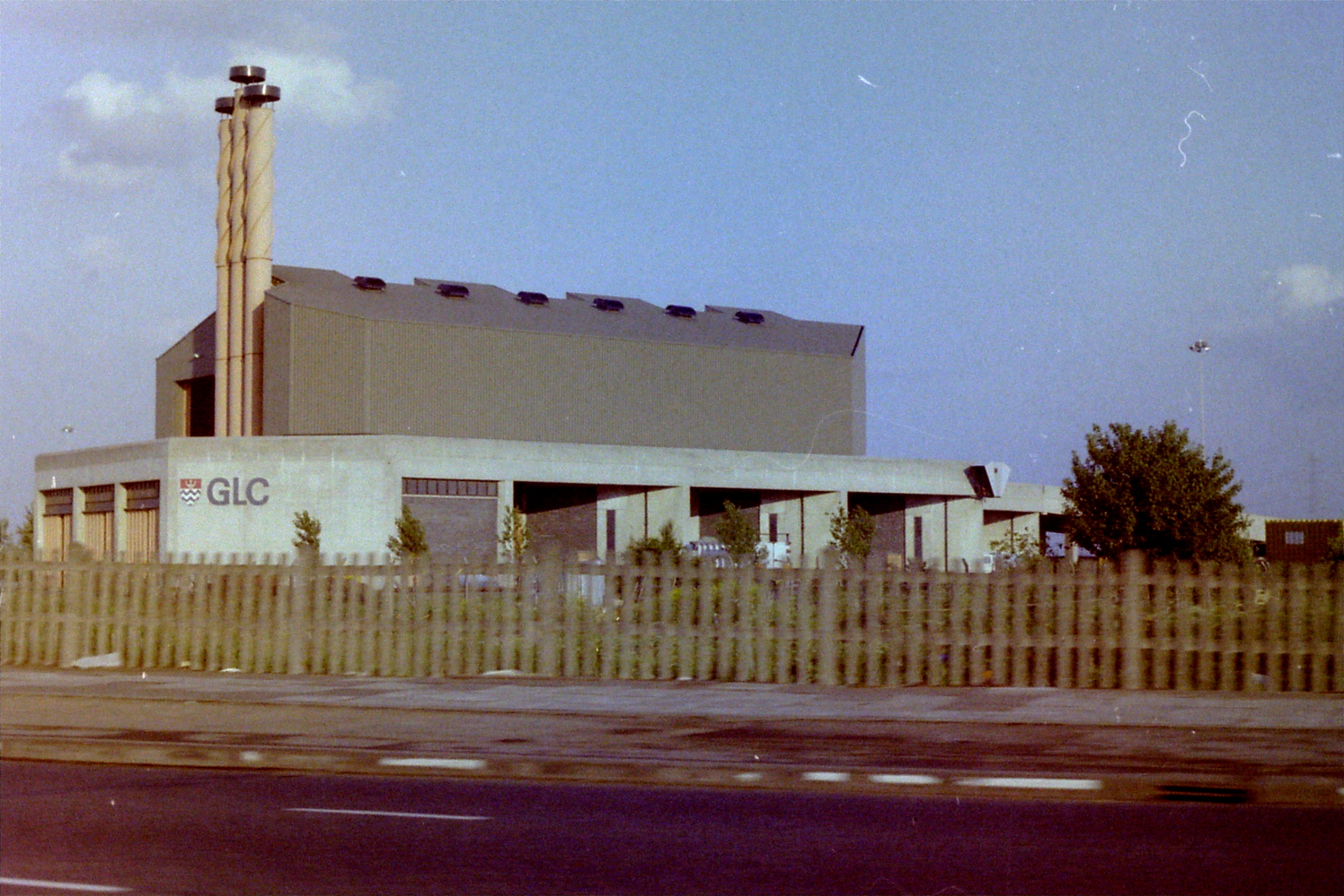
East London Refuse Transfer Station. Jenkins Lane, Newham, in 1980, now demolished.

The waste authority was established on 1 April 1986 as a joint arrangement under part II of the Local Government Act 1985. It replaced the Greater London Council in part of northeast London. The establishment of joint committees for this purpose was voluntary. The boroughs could have become individual waste disposal authorities. Each was already, and continued to be, responsible for waste collection.

== Role ==
East London Waste Authority consists of the London borough councils of Barking and Dagenham, Havering, Newham.

The function of the authority is to transport and dispose of waste collected in each of the four East London boroughs it is responsible for. In 1995 the Authority served a population of over one million, and treated and disposed of up to 400,000 tonnes per annum of waste.

== Activities ==
In January 2026, the authority invited artists to pitch artwork to encourage residents to recycle small electrical at designated recycling points. Between 2024-2025 and 2025-2026, there was a 52% increase in fires at the authority's facilities.

== See also ==
- North London Waste Authority
