= Merton rule =

Energy law in the United Kingdom

In the United Kingdom, the Merton Rule requires new commercial buildings over 1,000 square metres (10,764 sq ft) to generate at least 10% of their energy needs using on site renewable energy equipment. It was first introduced by Merton London Borough Council.

== Overview ==
The policy was developed and implemented by policy officers at Merton Council (initially by Nick Smart, the council's economic planner), who received corporate and political support. Its impact was such that the Mayor of London and many other councils also implemented it; and it became part of national planning guidance.

Over the following few years, Merton worked closely with other authorities, professions and industry to embed the Rule into the UK mainstream. This work not only led to significant CO_{2} reductions in new buildings where previously there would have been none, but it also helped to support an emerging industry. In 2006 Merton won the Royal Town Planning Institute's Silver Jubilee cup for the policy, and in 2008 Adrian Hewitt (the Merton Council officer responsible for implementing and driving the policy) won the UK Heating & Ventilation Contractors gold award.

In 2008, the UK government published its central planning guidance Planning Policy Statement – Planning and Climate Change – PPS1 that requires all UK local planning authorities to adopt a "Merton rule" policy. Receiving Royal Assent in November 2008, the Planning and Energy Act 2008 enables all councils in England and Wales to adopt a Merton Rule as well as specify energy efficiency standards over and above that of building regulations.

It was inevitable that such a radical policy would trigger a debate amongst property developers, energy companies, and practitioners. The policy has been criticised for assuming that in all cases renewable energy generation represents the most effective method of reducing CO_{2} emissions at any given location. However, the policy is an incentive for architects and engineers to design more energy efficient buildings – with the core rationale that the more energy efficient the building the less renewable energy is required to meet a percentage target.

The policy has also met resistance from building developers because the onsite renewable energy equipment increases capital costs. Supporters of the Merton Rule (and similar policies) argue that the revenue benefit accrues to the subsequent owner/occupiers in the form of reduced energy bills and increased equity – and as such the buildings carry a retail premium. The advent of the UK Government's Feed in Tariff has significantly reduced the payback time of photovoltaic, and wind/hydro turbine renewable energy capital costs.

The most in-depth review of the Merton Rule was undertaken by Bath University in 2008.

=== Monitoring the Merton Rule (and London Plan Policy 5.2) ===
After several years of implementing prescriptive renewable policies like the Merton Rule, UK boroughs realized they had a problem with keeping track of what renewable equipment had been installed – and whether the 10% target was actually being met. In 2013, Ealing Council in London implemented a policy (the Ealing Condition) that requires the automated remote monitoring of renewable/low-carbon energy in order to confirm compliance with their Local and London Plan (5.2) policies.

In 2014, Ealing's Automated Energy Monitoring Platform initiative was quoted as an example of Best Practice in the Mayor of London's Sustainable Design & Construction Supplementary Planning Guidance Guidance.

=== Proposed repeal (partial) of the Planning and Energy Act ===
The Government raised the possibility of repealing the Planning and Energy Act as part of the Housing Standards Review in 2013. The rationale was to place all renewable energy requirements under the Building Regulations. Proponents of this approach believed that this would create a level playing field for the house building sectors, whilst opponents believed it would stifle innovation and adversely impact the low-carbon engineering sectors. However, the proposal was finally rejected in 2014 and the Merton Rule remains in place, though the ability of Councils to require additional energy efficiency measures in new buildings was removed.

== See also ==
- Energy policy of the United Kingdom
- Environmental planning
- Renewable energy
