= London Strategic Licensing Policy =

Premises licensing policy for Greater London

The London Strategic Licensing Policy
- Author: Mayor of London
- Language: English
- Subject: Statutory strategic licensing document of Greater London
- Publisher: Greater London Authority
- Publication date: 2026
- Publication place: England and United Kingdom
- Media type: Digital (online and PDF)

The London Strategic Licensing Policy (LSLP) is the statutory premises licensing strategy for the Greater London area in the United Kingdom that is written by the Mayor of London and published by the Greater London Authority. It is updated from time to time.

== History ==
In February 2025, as Mayor of London, Sadiq Khan established a nightlife taskforce. In January 2026, it recommended the establishment of a London‑wide licensing standard to modernise licensing processes,

== Mandate ==
Under amendments to the Licensing Act 2003 made by the English Devolution and Community Empowerment Act 2026, the power is a statutory power of the Greater London Authority.

The policy enables the Mayor of London to "call in" an application of potentially strategic significance, in some cases overruling a local authority. Local authorities are required to give the GLA certain information as part of this process.

Under the wider powers, local authorities are required to consult the Mayor of London, when developing their licensing policies.

The definition of "strategic" significance requires that the premises must belong to either of the two highest fee bands – under the Licensing Act 2003, there are three fee bands – or the premises has a capacity of over 5,000 people.

== Policies ==
=== Cumulative impact ===
The draft London Strategic Licensing Policy published in February 2026, stated that cumulative impact assessments "should not create a rebuttable presumption to refuse applications".

== Timeline ==
Date	Description
February 2026	Initial draft of the London Strategic Licensing Policy.
November 2026	London Strategic Licensing Policy becomes a statutory responsibility of the Greater London Authority.

== See also ==
- London Plan
