= Sanctions and Anti-Money Laundering Act 2018 =

Act of the Parliament of the United Kingdom

Sanctions and Anti-Money Laundering Act 2018 (Note: Section 65.)
- Act of Parliament
- Parliament of the United Kingdom
- Long title: An Act to make provision enabling sanctions to be imposed where appropriate for the purposes of compliance with United Nations obligations or other international obligations or for the purposes of furthering the prevention of terrorism or for the purposes of national security or international peace and security or for the purposes of furthering foreign policy objectives; to make provision for the purposes of the detection, investigation and prevention of money laundering and terrorist financing and for the purposes of implementing Standards published by the Financial Action Task Force relating to combating threats to the integrity of the international financial system; and for connected purposes.
- Citation: 2018 c. 13
- Introduced by: Boris Johnson (Commons); Tariq Ahmad, Baron Ahmad of Wimbledon (Lords)
- Territorial extent: United Kingdom (Note: Section 63.)

Dates
- Royal assent: 23 May 2018
- Commencement: various (Note: Section 64.)
Other legislation
Amends	Immigration Act 1971; Senior Courts Act 1981; Regulation of Investigatory Powers Act 2000; Serious Organised Crime and Police Act 2005; Serious Crime Act 2007; Counter-Terrorism Act 2008; Terrorist Asset-Freezing etc. Act 2010; Charities Act 2011; Electronic Money Regulations 2011; Financial Services Act 2012; Legal Aid, Sentencing and Punishment of Offenders Act 2012; Crime and Courts Act 2013; Counter-Terrorism and Security Act 2015; Investigatory Powers Act 2016; Policing and Crime Act 2017; Money Laundering Regulations 2017; Payment Services Regulations 2017
Amended by	Sentencing Act 2020; Sanctions (EU Exit) (Consequential Provisions) (Amendment) Regulations 2020; Financial Services Act 2021; Economic Crime (Transparency and Enforcement) Act 2022; Criminal Justice Act 2003 (Commencement No. 33) and Sentencing Act 2020 (Commencement No. 2) Regulations 2022; Economic Crime and Corporate Transparency Act 2023; Judicial Review and Courts Act 2022 (Magistrates’ Court Sentencing Powers) Regulations 2023; Retained EU Law (Revocation and Reform) Act 2023 (Consequential Amendment) Regulations 2023

Status: Amended

History of passage through Parliament

Text of statute as originally enacted

Revised text of statute as amended

The Sanctions and Anti-Money Laundering Act 2018 (SAMLA 2018) is an act of the Parliament of the United Kingdom applying to the United Kingdom.

The act has two purposes; a) To enable the UK to create its own sanctions framework, allowing it to issue sanctions rather than adopting EU or UN models, and b) to make provisions of the purposes of the detection, investigation and prevention of money laundering and terrorist financing, and to implement standards published by the Financial Action Task Force (FATF), removing the need to adopt EU directives.

== Passage ==
The act was introduced to allow the UK to impose economic and other sanctions, and money laundering and terrorist financing regulations. Without introducing the act, the UK would be at risk of breaching its international obligations as a member of the United Nations following Britain's exit from the EU (colloquially referred to as Brexit).

The act allows the UK to implement sanctions passed by resolutions of the UN Security Council which were previously implemented through EU regulations under the EU’s Common Foreign and Security Policy.

On 1 May 2018, the UK House of Commons, without opposition, added the "Magnitsky amendment" to the Sanctions and Anti-Money Laundering Bill that allowed the British government to impose sanctions on people who commit gross human rights violations.

The act received royal assent on 23 May 2018, and by 12 July 2020 the Act was being used to sanction 49 individuals. Of those sanctioned 25 were Russian, 20 were Saudi Arabian, two were from Myanmar and two organisations were North Korean. Chief Executive of Hong Kong Carrie Lam was mentioned in Parliament by both parties that month in connection with the Act.

From the 31 December 2020, types of sanctions in the UK have changed due to Brexit and it is important that all organisations comply with and understand the new laws.

== Provisions ==
=== The power to make sanctions regulations ===
Much of the act covers the UK’s powers to make and enforce its own sanctions. The act confers broad powers upon the Secretary of State and the Treasury as the "appropriate Minister" to impose sanctions regulations for compliance with a UN obligation or any other international obligation, or for a purpose that would:

- prevent terrorist acts in the UK or elsewhere
- in the interests of national security
- the interests of global peace and security
- assist a UK government foreign policy goal
- promote the end of a war or protect civilians caught up in a conflict zone
- discourage gross abuses of human rights, promote compliance with international human rights law or international humanitarian law
- contribute to mutual international endeavours to thwart the spread and use of weapons and materials of mass destruction
- foster respect for democracy and the rule of law

For this reason, it is easier for the UK to impose sanctions under SAMLA 2018 if it is deemed appropriate by ministers. Under the UK’s prior adherence to EU regulations sanctions were only to be imposed when strictly necessary. This increase of UK powers to impose sanctions has been criticised by some, with Lord Judge in the House of Lords commenting that it was a "bonanza of regulations", further stating that the Bill should be rechristened as “the ‘Sanctions and Anti-Money Laundering (Regulation Bulk Buy) Bill".

The types of sanction outlined in the bill are:

1. Financial sanctions
2. Immigration sanctions
3. Trade sanctions
4. Aircraft sanctions
5. Shipping sanctions
6. Other sanctions for the purposes of UN obligations

By way of "other sanctions", the Act allows the "appropriate Minister making the regulations" to impose sanctions they deem appropriate to comply with a UN obligation.

=== Designation by Description ===
Under section 12 of SAMLA 2018, it allows the designation of persons by "description" as well as by name. This is not currently covered by EU regulations to which the UK left through leaving the EU.

For a sanction to apply to persons by description, several conditions must be met:

- Given the specific description, a reasonable person could establish whether the designated person fell within it.
- At the time of designation, it is not practicable for the Minister to name and identify every individual who fell within the description.
- The Minister had reasonable grounds to suspect:
  - that where the specified description is members of a particular organisation, that the organisation is an "involved person"; or
  - in the case of any other specified description, that any person falling within that description would necessarily be "an involved person".

=== Anti-money laundering regulations ===
The act covers anti-money laundering and terrorist funding. Through further regulations, it allows the British government to make provisions for enabling or facilitating the detection or investigation of money laundering and terrorist financing, or the prevention of either. In addition, it allows the Financial Action Task Force (FATF) to combat threats to the integrity of the international financial system via the implementation of Standards.

The act addresses concerns over the transparency of ownership of foreign companies, requiring the Secretary of State to publish regular reports on the progress made in creating a register of beneficial owners of overseas entities.
