= London Fire Commissioner =

Fire authority of Greater London, England

- Abbreviation: LFC
- Predecessor: London Fire and Emergency Planning Authority
- Formation: 1 April 2018
- Founder: Greater London Authority Act 1999
- Type: Fire authority
- Legal status: Functional body
- Purpose: Make key decisions on London Fire Brigade strategy, policy and budget
- Region served: London
- Parent organisation: Greater London Authority

The London Fire Commissioner (LFC) is a functional body of the Greater London Authority, with responsibility for the governance of the London Fire Brigade. It is a corporation sole and is the fire authority of Greater London. It replaced the London Fire and Emergency Planning Authority on 1 April 2018.

== History ==
The London Fire Commissioner was created on 1 April 2018 as part of a nationwide reform of governance following the Policing and Crime Act 2017. It replaced the London Fire and Emergency Planning Authority.

== Governance ==
The London Fire Commissioner is the body responsible for the governance of the London Fire Brigade. It is an incorporated as a corporation sole. It is the fire and rescue authority for London. It is a functional body of the Greater London Authority.

The Mayor of London is ultimately responsible for setting the organisation budget and approving the London Safety Plan.

There is a Deputy Mayor for Fire and Resilience who acts on behalf of the mayor.

The London Fire Commissioner is scrutinised by the Fire, Resilience and Emergency Planning Committee of the London Assembly.

== List of London Fire Commissioners ==
- Dany Cotton (2018–2019)
- Andy Roe (2019–2025)
- Jonathan Smith (2025–present)

== List of deputy mayors ==
- Fiona Twycross, Deputy Mayor for Fire and Resilience (2018–2024)
- Jules Pipe, Deputy Mayor for Planning, Regeneration and the Fire Service (2024–present)
