= Metropolitan open land =

Metropolitan open land (MOL) is a town planning designation used only within London, that is intended to protect strategically important areas of landscape, recreation, nature conservation and scientific interest.

== History ==
Metropolitan open land is a designation that was introduced by the 1976 Greater London Development Plan as areas of open land that are of significance for Greater London as a whole. The designation only applies to Greater London.

The term continued to be used under the 1990s regional planning guidance for London (RPG3). The London Plan also continues to use the terminology.

Land designated MOL is afforded the similar level of protection from development as the Metropolitan Green Belt. In 2026, Greenwich London Borough Council legally challenged a planning inspector decision to consider a portion of metropolitan open land as "grey belt" under the National Planning Policy Framework. In 2026, the Mayor of London introduced changes to the London Plan that would put metropolitan open land on a higher level of protection than the Green Belt.

== Examples ==
Some of the largest examples:

- Bushy Park
- Hampstead Heath
- Hackney Marshes
- Hyde Park
- Regent's Park
- Richmond Park
- Victoria Park
- Wimbledon Common

== Criteria for designation ==
Policy G3 of the 2021 London Plan states that land designated as MOL should satisfy at least one of the following criteria:

1. It contributes to the physical structure of London by being clearly distinguishable from the built-up area
2. It includes open air facilities, especially for leisure, recreation, sport, the arts and cultural activities, which serve either the whole or significant parts of London
3. It contains features or landscapes (historic, recreational, biodiverse) of either national or metropolitan value
4. It forms part of a strategic corridor, node or a link in the network of green infrastructure and meets one of the above criteria.

== Alterations to boundaries ==
Policy G3 of the 2021 London Plan states that any alterations to the boundary of MOL should be undertaken through the local plan process, in consultation with the Mayor of London and adjoining boroughs. MOL boundaries should only be changed in exceptional circumstances.

== Role of Mayor of London ==
The Mayor of London has formally stated that he will, and believes boroughs should, maintain the protection of Metropolitan Open Land from inappropriate development. Any alterations to the boundary of MOL should be undertaken by boroughs through the DPD ("Development Plan Document") process, in consultation with the mayor and adjoining authorities.
