= Economic Crime (Transparency and Enforcement) Act 2022 =

Act of the Parliament of the United Kingdom

Economic Crime (Transparency and Enforcement) Act 2022 (Note: Section 70.)
- Act of Parliament
- Parliament of the United Kingdom
- Long title: An Act to set up a register of overseas entities and their beneficial owners and require overseas entities who own land to register in certain circumstances; to make provision about unexplained wealth orders; and to make provision about sanctions.
- Citation: 2022 c. 10
- Introduced by: Priti Patel, Home Secretary; 1 March 2022 (Commons); Baroness Williams of Trafford, Minister of State for Home Affairs; 8 March 2022 (Lords)
- Territorial extent: England and Wales; Scotland; Northern Ireland; (Note: Section 68.)

Dates
- Royal assent: 14 March 2022
- Commencement: Various (Note: Section 69.)
Other legislation
Amends	Conveyancing (Scotland) Act 1924; Land Registration Act (Northern Ireland) 1970; Proceeds of Crime Act 2002; Land Registration Act 2002; Land Registration etc. (Scotland) Act 2012; Policing and Crime Act 2017; Anti-Money Laundering Act 2018; Sanctions and Anti-Money Laundering Act 2018
Amended by	Economic Crime and Corporate Transparency Act 2023
Relates to	Policing and Crime Act 2017; Sanctions and Anti-Money Laundering Act 2018

Status: Amended

History of passage through Parliament

Text of statute as originally enacted

Revised text of statute as amended

The Economic Crime (Transparency and Enforcement) Act 2022 (c. 10) is an act of Parliament of the United Kingdom, which expands provisions in relation to sanctions and financial crime, that was fast-tracked through Parliament in response to the 2022 Russian invasion of Ukraine.

== Background ==
During the 2022 Russian invasion of Ukraine, British law enforcement agencies and transparency campaigners raised concerns about the property market of the United Kingdom being used by criminal organisations and corrupt individuals to commit financial crimes.

=== Passage ===
The Economic Crime (Transparency and Enforcement) Bill was formally introduced to the House of Commons of the United Kingdom as a government bill on 1 March 2022. The bill was debated and entered a Committee of the Whole House on 7 March.

Following its passage through the House of Commons, the bill was formally introduced to the House of Lords on 8 March, and was debated the following day. The bill entered committee and received royal assent on 14 March.

== The act ==
=== Register of Overseas Entities ===
Part 1 of the act sets up a register of overseas entities, which includes information about their beneficial owners (sections 3 to 32), and which makes provisions designed to compel overseas entities to register if they currently own, or wish to own, land in the United Kingdom (sections 33 and 34).

=== Unexplained wealth orders ===
Part 2 of the act sets out provisions relating to unexplained wealth orders.

=== Sanctions ===
Part 3 of the act contains amendments to the imposition of monetary penalties under the Policing and Crime Act 2017 and amends the UK's sanctions framework under the Sanctions and Anti-Money Laundering Act 2018.

== Reception ==
The Law Society of England and Wales welcomed the passage of the act.

== See also ==
- List of acts of the Parliament of the United Kingdom from 2022
