= Economic Crime and Corporate Transparency Act 2023 =

Act of the Parliament of the United Kingdom

Economic Crime and Corporate Transparency Act 2023 (Note: Section 221.)
- Act of Parliament
- Parliament of the United Kingdom
- Long title: An Act to make provision about economic crime and corporate transparency; to make further provision about companies, limited partnerships and other kinds of corporate entity; and to make provision about the registration of overseas entities.
- Citation: 2023 c. 56
- Introduced by: Suella Braverman, Secretary of State for the Home Department (Commons); The Lord Johnson of Lainston, Minister of State for Investment (Lords)
- Territorial extent: England and Wales; Scotland; Ireland; (Note: Section 218.)

Dates
- Royal assent: 26 October 2023
- Commencement: Various (Note: Section 219.)
Other legislation
| Amends | Partnership Act 1890; Limited Partnerships Act 1907; Land Registration Act (Northern Ireland) 1970; Solicitors Act 1974; Solicitors (Scotland) Act 1980; Civil Jurisdiction and Judgments Act 1982; Administration of Justice Act 1985; Company Directors Disqualification Act 1986; Criminal Justice Act 1987; Terrorism Act 2000; Anti-terrorism, Crime and Security Act 2001; Land Registration Act 2002; Proceeds of Crime Act 2002; Company Directors Disqualification (Northern Ireland) Order 2002; Serious Organised Crime and Police Act 2005; Companies Act 2006; Serious Crime Act 2007; UK Borders Act 2007; Legal Services Act 2007; Land Registration etc. (Scotland) Act 2012; Crime and Courts Act 2013; Alternative Investment Fund Managers Regulations 2013; Reports on Payments to Governments Regulations 2014; Bankruptcy (Scotland) Act 2016; Policing and Crime Act 2017; Scottish Partnerships (Register of People with Significant Control) Regulations 2017; Sanctions and Anti-Money Laundering Act 2018; Economic Crime (Transparency and Enforcement) Act 2022 |
| Amended by | Finance Act 2026 |

Status: Amended

History of passage through Parliament

Text of statute as originally enacted

Revised text of statute as amended

The Economic Crime and Corporate Transparency Act 2023 (c. 56) is an act of the Parliament of the United Kingdom. One of the act's main aims is to overhaul the companies registry in the United Kingdom to drive out foreign corrupt funds from the United Kingdom economy. The act is further aimed to counter fraud and money laundering.

== Passage ==
The bill for the act was introduced to the House of Commons on 22 September 2022 and had its third reading in the House of Lords on 4 July 2023. The act was significantly amended when travelling through the Lords and there was a stand-off with both Houses during the wash-up period leading up to the 2023 prorogation of Parliament about the final form of the act. The act was finally agreed to on 25 October 2023 and received royal assent on 26 October 2023.

== Provisions ==
The act establishes a register of foreign owners of UK property, held by Companies House.

Sections 194 and 195 allows the courts in England and Wales to strike out cases deemed to be strategic lawsuits against public participation (SLAPPs). This was implemented in 2025 by amending Parts 3 and 44 of the Civil Procedure Rules. This power was exercised for the first time in March 2026 in a defamation case brought against the British tax lawyer Dan Neidle.

== Implementation ==
Companies House's implementation costs are being met by increased charges for company filing services, effective from 1 May 2024:

- the charge for changing a company's name online was increased from £8 to £20
- the charge for filing a confirmation statement online was increased from £13 to £34
- the charge for a same-day reduction of share capital was increased from £50 to £136.

== Reception ==
The act was supported by the campaign group Spotlight on Corruption, who described UK corporate structures as being the "vehicle of choice for fraudsters and money launderers all over the globe" due to weaknesses at Companies House.

== See also ==
- Economic Crime (Transparency and Enforcement) Act 2022
