= Greater Manchester Integrated Transport Authority =

Local transport authority in Greater Manchester, England

- Formation: 1 April 1986
- Founder: Local Government Act 1985
- Dissolved: 1 April 2011
- Subsidiaries: Greater Manchester Passenger Transport Executive
- Formerly called: Greater Manchester Passenger Transport Authority

The Greater Manchester Integrated Transport Authority (GMITA) was a local government institution responsible for the strategic direction of passenger transport in Greater Manchester.

== Establishment ==
It existed from 1969 to 1974 as the SELNEC Passenger Transport Authority and was then replaced by Greater Manchester County Council.

It was created again in 1986 as the Greater Manchester Passenger Transport Authority.

== Reconstitution in 1986 ==
The passenger transport authority was reconstituted by the Local Government Act 1985 in 1986 to replace the Greater Manchester County Council which was abolished. Its membership was made up of appointed councillors from the councils in Greater Manchester, based on population: Bolton 3, Bury 2, Manchester 5, Oldham 3, Rochdale 2, Salford 3, Stockport 3, Tameside 3, Trafford 3, and Wigan 3.

== Reform and replacement ==
The Local Transport Act 2008 reconstituted it as the Greater Manchester Integrated Transport Authority.

The integrated transport authority was replaced by Transport for Greater Manchester in 2011, which is accountable to the Greater Manchester Combined Authority.

Preceded by Various other	SELNEC public transport authority 1969–1974	Succeeded by Greater Manchester County Council
Preceded by Greater Manchester County Council	Greater Manchester public transport authority 1986–2011	Succeeded by Greater Manchester Combined Authority
