= London Planning Advisory Committee =

- Abbreviation: LPAC
- Predecessor: Greater London Council
- Successor: Greater London Authority
- Formation: 1 April 1986
- Dissolved: 2000
- Type: Joint planning committee for Greater London
- Region served: Greater London
- Leader: Sally Hamwee (1986–1994); Nicky Gavron (1994–2000)
- Parent organisation: Havering London Borough Council

The London Planning Advisory Committee (LPAC) was an ad hoc Londonwide joint committee responsible for strategic planning from the abolition of the Greater London Council in 1986 to the creation of the Greater London Authority in 2000. The leader was Sally Hamwee from 1986 to 1994 and Nicky Gavron from 1994 to 2000.

== Statutory basis ==
The Local Government Act 1985 required the London borough councils to set up a "joint planning committee for Greater London".

The Town and Country Planning Act 1990 Section 3 (2) detailed the functions of the joint planning committee as:

- advise the local planning authorities (the London borough councils and the City of London Corporation);
- inform the Secretary of State of their views; and
- inform the local planning authorities for areas near Greater London and other relevant bodies.

The London Planning Advisory Committee was serviced by Havering London Borough Council.

The functions of the committee were taken on by the Greater London Authority.

== See also ==
- Governance of Greater London (1986–2000)
