= Edmonton EcoPark =

Waste-to-energy plant in London, United Kingdom

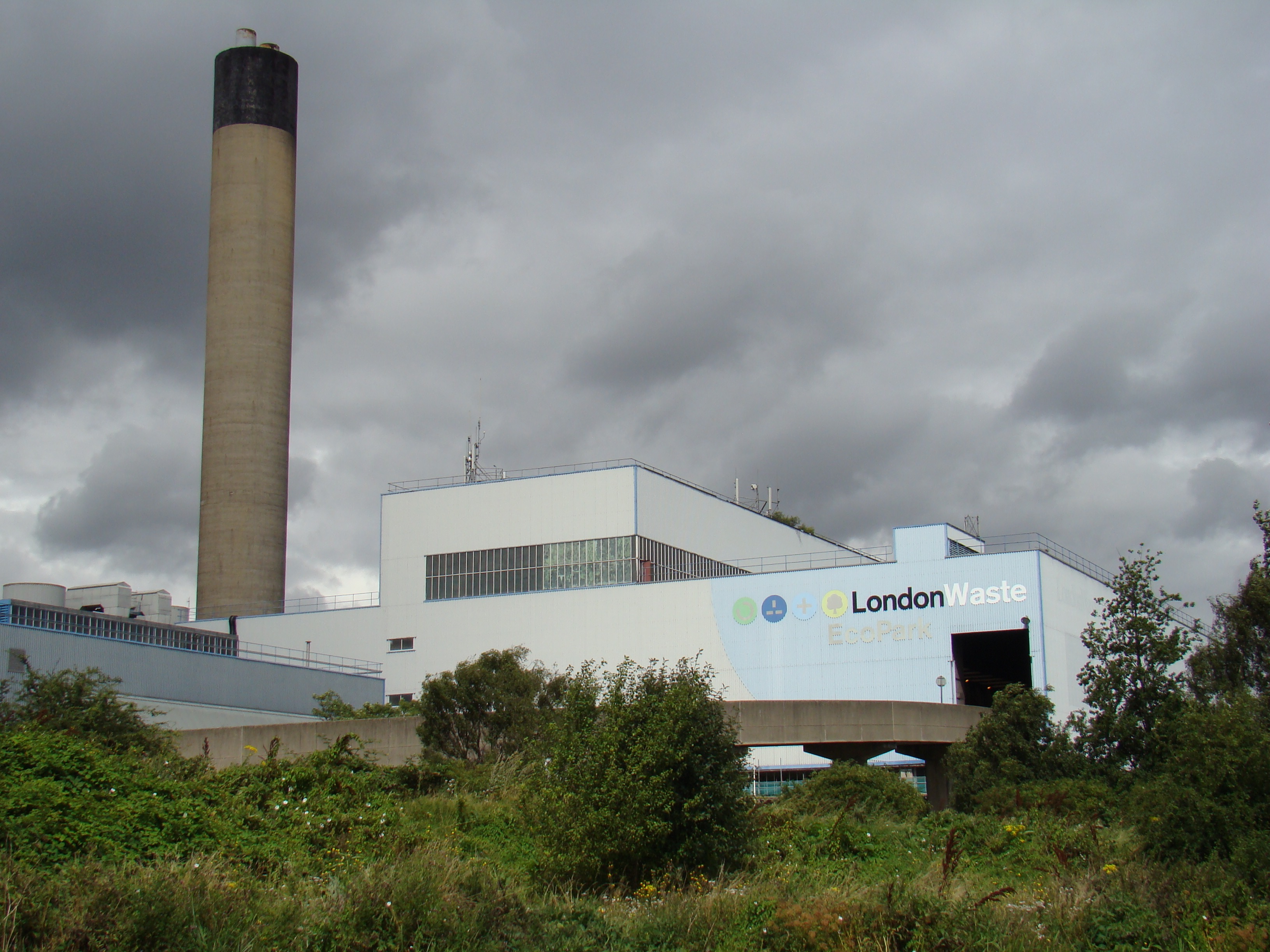
- Official name: EcoPark
- Country: England
- Location: Greater London
- Coordinates: 51.6158°N 0.0414°W
- Commission date: 1971
- Operator: LondonEnergy

Thermal power station
- Primary fuel: Waste to Energy & Recycling

External links
- Commons: Related media on Commons

Edmonton EcoPark is a waste-to-energy plant which burns waste from several London boroughs to provide electricity for the National Grid. It is located on the River Lee Navigation and bordered by the North Circular Road, in Edmonton in the London Borough of Enfield. It is also known as Edmonton EcoPark.

== History ==
The facility was commissioned (began operations) in 1971, by the Greater London Council. The building is of metal sheet clad construction with a 100 metres (330 ft) reinforced concrete chimney. It was described by Bridget Cherry as being, "on the edge of the marshes, in a setting that enhances its impressive scale. Vast box-like forms clad in corrugated metal sheeting, pale grey and dark grey, approached by two big ramps on tapering piers. Huge cylindrical concrete chimney containing two flues."

The incinerator was Britain's largest, handling unrecycled waste from seven London Boroughs: Barnet, Camden, Enfield, Islington, Hackney, Haringey, and Waltham Forest. The waste is converted into carbon dioxide, bottom ash, air pollution control residue, and other flue gases. 55 megawatts (MW) of electricity are generated, sufficient power to meet the needs of 24,000 households.

=== Expansion ===
In early 2002, plans were rejected for a large expansion of the waste-to-energy facility, which would have made it the largest household waste incinerator in Europe. Permissions had been granted by both the Environment Agency and Enfield Council, but on 23 May 2002, Energy Minister Brian Wilson refused the plans on the basis of the 2000 Waste Strategy.

In January 2021, Taylor Woodrow Construction started work on an expansion of the facility known as "EcoPark South": the new plant, with a capacity to recover 135,000 tonnes of material each year, was due to be completed in 2023. The resource recovery facility and an EcoPark visitor centre were completed on budget, but costs on a larger contract for an energy recovery facility rose from £1.2bn to £1.5bn, due to construction material and wage inflation. Completion of the project by Acciona, originally scheduled for 2025, was delayed to 2027, and then December 2029, following a series of claims and disputes between Acciona and the North London Waste Authority.

== Environmental impact and protests ==
The site has been the scene of a demonstration by Greenpeace, who are against all incinerators because they emit "a cocktail of chemicals that can cause cancers and asthma attacks", and that incineration "undermines targets for waste reduction and recycling". In October 2000 they scaled and occupied the station's chimney, shutting its operations down for four days. The incinerator has also been campaigned against by Friends of the Earth and Londoners Against Incineration.

An Environment Agency report on the safety of incinerator ash was published in May 2002. It highlighted that up until 2000, ash from Edmonton had been used in the manufacture of construction blocks, which was hazardous because of the raised levels of dioxins in dust from the blocks. However, the practice ceased in August 2000.

In 2007, there were concerns that a rise in infant deaths in the area was caused by fumes from the incinerator.

== Today ==
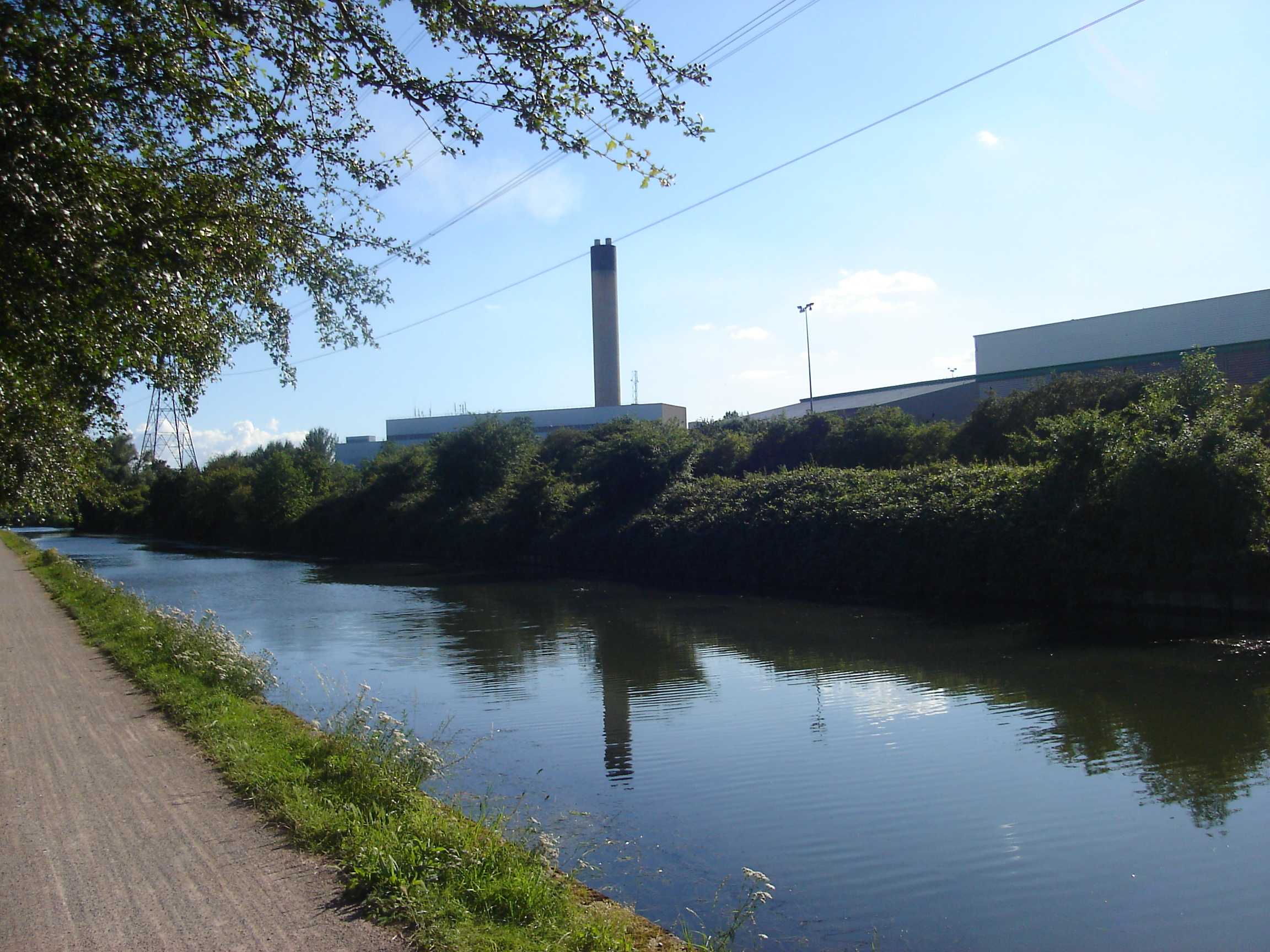
Edmonton EcoPark from the River Lee Navigation

The site is run by LondonEnergy. Trials are being carried out to use the River Lee Navigation in transporting materials to the incinerator. A large composting facility opened on the site in 2006, allowing green and kitchen waste from local homes to be converted into compost.
