= Policing and Crime Act 2017 =

Act of the Parliament of the United Kingdom

Policing and Crime Act 2017 (Note: Section 184.)
- Act of Parliament
- Parliament of the United Kingdom
- Long title: An Act to make provision for collaboration between the emergency services; to make provision about the handling of police complaints and other matters relating to police conduct and to make further provision about the Independent Police Complaints Commission; to make provision for super-complaints about policing; to make provision for the investigation of concerns about policing raised by whistle-blowers; to make provision about police discipline; to make provision about police inspection; to make provision about the powers of police civilian staff and police volunteers; to remove the powers of the police to appoint traffic wardens; to enable provision to be made to alter police ranks; to make provision about the Police Federation; to make provision in connection with the replacement of the Association of Chief Police Officers with the National Police Chiefs’ Council; to make provision about the system for bail after arrest but before charge; to make provision about the retention of biometric material; to make provision to enable greater use of modern technology at police stations; to make other amendments to the Police and Criminal Evidence Act 1984; to amend the powers of the police under the Mental Health Act 1983; to extend the powers of the police in relation to maritime enforcement; to make provision for cross-border enforcement; to make provision about the powers of the police to require removal of disguises; to make provision about deputy police and crime commissioners and the Deputy Mayor for Policing and Crime; to make provision to enable changes to the names of police areas; to make provision about the regulation of firearms and pyrotechnic articles; to make provision about the licensing of alcohol; to make provision about the implementation and enforcement of financial sanctions; to amend the Police Act 1996 to make further provision about police collaboration; to make provision about the powers of the National Crime Agency; to make provision for requiring arrested persons to provide details of nationality; to make provision for requiring defendants in criminal proceedings to provide details of nationality and other information; to make provision about the seizure etc of invalid travel documents; to make provision for pardons for convictions etc for certain abolished offences; to make provision to protect the anonymity of victims of forced marriage; to increase the maximum sentences of imprisonment for certain offences of putting people in fear of violence etc; to make provision to combat the sexual exploitation of children and to protect children and vulnerable adults from harm; to make provision about coroners’ duties in respect of deaths in state detention; to make provision about the powers of litter authorities in Scotland; and for connected purposes.
- Citation: 2017 c. 3
- Introduced by: Amber Rudd, Home Secretary (Commons); Baroness Williams of Trafford, Minister of State for Countering Extremism (Lords)
- Territorial extent: England and Wales; Scotland (in part); Northern Ireland (in part); (Note: Section 182.)

Dates
- Royal assent: 31 January 2017
- Commencement: 31 January 2017 (s. 124, 164, 165, 167, 179 and 180 - 184); 31 March 2017 (s. 76, 159, 158, 173, 174, and schedule 19); Other sections come into force by Statutory Instrument or by order. (Note: Section 183.) (Note: Section 183.)
Other legislation
Amends	Fire Services Act 1947; Essex County Council Act 1952; Landlord and Tenant Act 1954; Public Records Act 1958; Local Government (Records) Act 1962; London Government Act 1963; Local Government Act 1966; Leasehold Reform Act 1967; Firearms Act 1968; Local Government Grants (Social Need) Act 1969; Employers' Liability (Compulsory Insurance) Act 1969; Greater London Council (General Powers) Act 1969; Local Authorities (Goods and Services) Act 1970; Chronically Sick and Disabled Persons Act 1970; Pensions (Increase) Act 1971; Superannuation Act 1972; Local Government Act 1972; Employment Agencies Act 1973; Local Government Act 1974; Health and Safety at Work etc. Act 1974; House of Commons Disqualification Act 1975; Northern Ireland Assembly Disqualification Act 1975; Police Pensions Act 1976; Local Government (Miscellaneous Provisions) Act 1976; Rent (Agriculture) Act 1976; Rent Act 1977; London Hydraulic Power Act 1977; Protection from Eviction Act 1977; Rehabilitation of Offenders (Northern Ireland) Order 1978; Local Government, Planning and Land Act 1980; Aviation Security Act 1982; Acquisition of Land Act 1981; Local Government (Miscellaneous Provisions) Act 1982; Representation of the People Act 1983; Mental Health Act 1983; Road Traffic Regulation Act 1984; County Courts Act 1984; Police and Criminal Evidence Act 1984; Local Government Act 1985; Housing Act 1985; Housing Associations Act 1985; Local Government Act 1986; Ministry of Defence Police Act 1987; Landlord and Tenant Act 1987; Local Government Act 1988; Firearms (Amendment) Act 1988; Housing Act 1988; Road Traffic Act 1988; Local Government and Housing Act 1989; Aviation and Maritime Security Act 1990; Town and Country Planning Act 1990; London Local Authorities Act 1991; Local Government Finance Act 1992; Local Government (Overseas Assistance) Act 1993; Criminal Justice and Public Order Act 1994; Deregulation and Contracting Out Act 1994; London Local Authorities Act 1995; Police Act 1996; Housing Grants, Construction and Regeneration Act 1996; Channel Tunnel Rail Link Act 1996; Firearms (Amendment) Act 1997; Protection from Harassment Act 1997; Police Act 1997; Crime and Disorder Act 1998; Local Government Act 1999; Greater London Authority Act 1999; Representation of the People Act 2000; Terrorism Act 2000; Local Government Act 2000; Regulation of Investigatory Powers Act 2000; Freedom of Information Act 2000; Private Security Industry Act 2001; Criminal Justice and Police Act 2001; Anti-terrorism, Crime and Security Act 2001; Police Reform Act 2002; Licensing Act 2003; Railways and Transport Safety Act 2003; Local Government Act 2003; Anti-social Behaviour Act 2003; Courts Act 2003; Sexual Offences Act 2003; Criminal Justice Act 2003; Fire and Rescue Services Act 2004; Energy Act 2004; Commissioners for Revenue and Customs Act 2005; Serious Organised Crime and Police Act 2005; Regulatory Reform (Fire Safety) Order 2005; Violent Crime Reduction Act 2006; Education and Inspections Act 2006; Police and Justice Act 2006; Finance Act 2007; Serious Crime Act 2007; Greater London Authority Act 2007; Local Government and Public Involvement in Health Act 2007; UK Borders Act 2007; Criminal Justice and Immigration Act 2008; Crossrail Act 2008; Counter-Terrorism Act 2008; Local Democracy, Economic Development and Construction Act 2009; Coroners and Justice Act 2009; Equality Act 2010; Police Reform and Social Responsibility Act 2011; Localism Act 2011; Protection of Freedoms Act 2012; Legal Aid, Sentencing and Punishment of Offenders Act 2012; Police (Complaints and Conduct) Act 2012; Crime and Courts Act 2013; Public Service Pensions Act 2013; Energy Act 2013; Local Audit and Accountability Act 2014; Anti-social Behaviour, Crime and Policing Act 2014; Human Trafficking and Exploitation (Criminal Justice and Support for Victims) Act (Northern Ireland) 2015; Psychoactive Substances Act 2016; Investigatory Powers Act 2016
Amended by	Data Protection Act 2018; Sanctions and Anti-Money Laundering Act 2018; Law Enforcement and Security (Amendment) (EU Exit) Regulations 2019; Sentencing Act 2020; Armed Forces Act 2021; Economic Crime (Transparency and Enforcement) Act 2022; Police, Crime, Sentencing and Courts Act 2022; Criminal Justice Act 2003 (Commencement No. 33) and Sentencing Act 2020 (Commencement No. 2) Regulations 2022; Levelling-up and Regeneration Act 2023; Economic Crime and Corporate Transparency Act 2023; Judicial Review and Courts Act 2022 (Magistrates’ Court Sentencing Powers) Regulations 2023; Employment Rights Act 2025

Status: Amended

History of passage through Parliament

Text of statute as originally enacted

Revised text of statute as amended

The Policing and Crime Act 2017 (c. 3) is an act of the Parliament of the United Kingdom. It received royal assent on 31 January 2017.

== Synopsis ==
The act enacts various changes to existing rules involving PCCs, complaints through the IPCC, amendments to PACE 1984 etc.

=== Police, fire and crime commissioners ===
The act enabled police and crime commissioners to take on fire and rescue authority functions, and become police, fire and crime commissioners.

=== London Fire Commissioner ===
The act replaced the London Fire and Emergency Planning Authority with the London Fire Commissioner.

=== PCSOs ===
One notable change involves the expansion of powers to police staff and introduces voluntary police community support officers (PCSOs). It is also expands the powers of a PCSO to "any power or duty of a constable, other than a power or duty specified in Part 1 of Schedule 3B (excluded powers and duties)". Part 6 of the act brings clarity to the classifying guns under the Firearms Act 1968, based on recommendations from the Law Commission.

=== Police bail procedure ===
Another change relates to police bail, which can now only be authorised by an officer of inspector rank or higher (so normally a suspect will now be released without bail if not charged), and extending this period is now only possible once by authorisation of a superintendent officer, or again by a magistrates' court; previously it was possible for police to effectively restrain a person indefinitely by extending the bail period every 28 days. Controversially this has led police forces to adopt an alternative method of 'release under investigation' (RUI) with no time limits or conditions, requiring a suspect to respond by post.

In December 2020, Her Majesty's Inspectorate of Constabulary and Fire & Rescue Services released a report on RUI.

In November 2017, Hertfordshire Constabulary released under the Freedom of Information Act 2000 a copy of the template RUI form used by them.

=== Alan Turing law ===
The Act also offers a pardon to men convicted for homosexual acts that are no longer considered criminal offences. This is sometimes informally referred to as the Alan Turing law, named for Alan Turing, the mathematician and World War II codebreaker, who was convicted of gross indecency in 1952.

== See also ==
- Policing and Crime Act 2009
- Police Reform Act 2002
