= Health in London =

Health in London refers to the overall health of the population of London. The World Health Organization defines health as "a state of complete physical, mental and social well-being".

== Life expectancy ==
Among the regions in England, in 2023-2025, London's life expectancy was the highest for women and the second-highest for men.

In 2015, the London borough with the highest life expectancy was Kensington and Chelsea, and the London boroughs with the least life expectancy was Tower Hamlets and Barking and Dagenham.

As of 2026, the London borough with the highest life expectancy is Richmond upon Thames, and the London borough with the least life expectancy is Greenwich.

== Infant and maternal health ==
=== Infant mortality ===
Infant mortality in London (3.3 deaths among children aged 0-11, for every 1,000 live births) is lower than England overall (3.7 deaths among children aged 0-11, for every 1,000 live births).

=== Children born with low birth weight ===
Children in London are more likely to have a low birth weight, with some of this being due to the higher levels of PM2.5 pollution.

=== Maternal mortality ===
Maternal mortality in London is substantially higher than the rest of the United Kingdom.

== Free school meals and school breakfast clubs ==
Free school meals were first introduced under the Education Act 1944, and then deregulated under the Education Act 1980.

In 2012, a charity, the Mayor's Fund for London provided free breakfast schools in the poorest areas in London. In the 2024 London mayoral election, Sadiq Khan pledged to extend free school meals to older primary school pupils.

== Contagious disease and vaccination ==
=== Sexually transmitted infections ===
In 2024, gay and bisexual men accounted for 75% of syphilis and 70% gonorrhoea cases in London.

According to the Health Security Agency, there were 39,750 people in London with HIV. In 2015, London accounted for 60% of Syphilis cases in England.

=== Tuberculosis ===
Between 1948 and 1987, there was a decrease in the incidence of tuberculosis of 90%. Between 1987 and 1993, there was an increase in tuberculosis of 34%, compared with 15% nationally.

In 2012, London had a rate of 42 cases of tuberculosis per 100,000 people, compared to a rate for the whole of the United Kingdom of 14 per 100,000 people, a rate of 23 per 100,000 people for Copenhagen, and a rate of 17,000 per 100,000 people for Copenhagen.

=== Measles ===
In 2003, there was an outbreak of approximately 100 cases of measles in Lambeth, Southwark and Lewisham.

=== COVID-19 pandemic ===
London experienced the highest COVID-19 mortality, consequentially experienced the largest increase in mortality, compared to the other regions of England.

Among the regions of the United Kingdom, London had the highest proportion of deaths involving COVID-19, with 8,536 deaths involving COVID-19, making up 30.6% of the 27,908 total deaths.

=== Polio ===
In 2022, between February and August, poliovirus was found 116 times in wastewater.

== Healthcare ==
=== General practice ===
In 2012, London was the first region in England where GP services became available during weekends and evenings.

=== Dentistry ===
Between 2017 and 2026, the number of dentist practices in London decreased from 1074 to 1024.

=== Emergency departments ===
Corridor care has been reported at several NHS trusts in London including King's College NHS Foundation Trust, Barking, Havering and Redbridge University Hospitals NHS Trust and Epsom and St Helier University Hospitals NHS Trust.

=== Elective treatment ===
In most NHS trusts in London, the proportion of patients waiting less than 18 weeks to start treatment is between 50 and 70%.

=== Mental healthcare ===
South London and Maudsley NHS Foundation Trust is the largest mental health trust in England.

==== Autism and ADHD healthcare ====
According to 2024 reporting by the BBC, of seven NHS trusts which provided statistics, only North East London NHS Foundation Trust was projected to clear all the ADHD assessments in their backlog at that time.

==== Transgender healthcare ====
Between 1989 and 2023, the Tavistock and Portman NHS Foundation Trust contained the only dedicated gender identity clinic, Gender Identity Development Service, in the United Kingdom.

== Mental health and addiction ==
=== Alcohol consumption ===
Alcohol consumption In London is lower than for the United Kingdom as a whole. London has the lowest rate of alcohol-specific deaths of any English region. According to a survey by Babylon Health, residents of Hackney drink the most units of alcohol per week, and residents of Havering drink the least units of alcohol per week.

=== Gambling ===
The Gambling Act 2005 allowed gambling firms to advertise sports betting, poker and online casinos for the first time.

In 2011, the largest casino in London opened in Newham.

Between 2020 and 2025, the number of gambling venues decreased from 1516 to 1478. At the same time, gambling venues became more likely to be located in more deprived areas of London.

In the 2021 London mayoral election, Sadiq Khan pledged to ban gambling advertisements from Transport for London services. As of 2026, gambling advertisements continue on Transport for London services.

The London borough of Brent has a significantly higher proportion of its residents being considered problem gamblers, compared to the United Kingdom as a whole.

=== Smoking and vaping ===
In 2014, Boris Johnson suggested that smoking should be banned in Trafalgar Square and Parliament Square.

=== Unhealthy food and drink ===
In 2018, Transport for London banned advertisements for junk food on its services. In 2026, the government announced that deep-fried food would be banned and high-sugar items would be restricted in school meals.

=== Mental health and stress ===
Individuals living in London are more likely to have poor mental health, compared to individuals living in United Kingdom overall. The reasons for this include: the higher cost-of-living and the reduced access to green spaces. The rate of depression is highest in inner London.

=== Drugs crisis ===
In 2023, the number of drug-related deaths in London was relatively low compared to the rest of England, with 58.1 drug-related deaths per million people and 41.0 drug misuse deaths per million people. In London, there were 76.5 drug-poisoning deaths per million people, the largest increase in any region in England and Wales.

== Air quality ==
Between the 2003 and 2008, there was an increase in 183 years of life per 100,000 population in the area within the congestion charging zone, compared to increase of 18 years of life per 100,000 population for the area outside the congestion charge.

Between 2018-2019 and 2022-2023, the proportion of children in London whose lung capacity was deemed to be "clinically impaired" decreased from 14% to 9%.

== Housing ==
=== Homelessness and temporary accommodation ===
In the year to July 2025, there were 13,231 people classed as homeless, a representing a 10% increase on the previous year.

Between 2020 and 2025, temporary accommodation contributed to the deaths of at least 74 children.

=== Housing with mould and damp problems ===
According to 2025 report by Uswitch, eight of the ten local authorities with the largest proportion of their housing having mould problem and damp problems. The local authority in the United Kingdom with the most complaints per 10,000 units according to the 2026 edition of the report was Haringey.

== Active travel ==
There was a significant increase in school children walking and cycling to school in the area of the ultra low emissions zone.

In 2025, there were 1196 cyclists who were seriously injured, which represented an increase of 21% over the previous year, and 6 cyclist deaths. In 1989, there were 33 pedal cycle fatalities and 752 pedal cycle fatal and serious casualties. There has been a long-term decrease in deaths and a long-term increase in serious injuries.

In 2024, 279 of the 1,387 casualties associated with e-scooters occurred in London.

== Governance ==
=== Local government ===
Under the Greater London Authority Act 2007, the Mayor of London became responsible for the appointment of a statutory health adviser and for the publication of a Greater London Authority health inequalities strategy. The first Greater London Authority health inequalities strategy was published in 2010.

As of July 2026, local authorities are able to appoint individuals to integrated care boards in their areas.
