= Regional planning guidance =

Planning policy in the United Kingdom

Regional planning guidance was the predecessor of regional spatial strategies.

In England, regional planning guidance documents were written by the government after consultation with conferences of the local authorities in each region.

The Confederation of British Industry and the Building Employers Confederation criticised the housing targets for 1991 to 2001 under the draft guidance issued in 1990.

The guidance was issued under the Town and Country Planning Act 1990.

The last region to have final regional planning guidance was North West England (RPG 13).

The guidance for London (RPG 3) was replaced by the London Plan.
