= North London Waste Authority =

Waste disposal authority

Agency overview
- Formed: 1 April 1986
- Preceding Agency: Greater London Council
- Jurisdiction: London boroughs of Barnet, Camden, Enfield, Hackney, Haringey, Islington, Waltham Forest
- Headquarters: 1b Berol House, 25 Ashley Road, Tottenham Hale N17 9LJ
- Agency executive: Councillor Jacob Cable (Green, Chair

The North London Waste Authority (NLWA) is a waste disposal authority with responsibility for disposal of waste in the north London boroughs of Barnet, Camden, Enfield, Hackney, Haringey, Islington, and Waltham Forest.

== History ==
The NLWA was established on 1 April 1986 as a joint arrangement under part II of the Local Government Act 1985. It replaced the Greater London Council in part of north London. The establishment of joint committees for this purpose was voluntary. The boroughs could have become individual waste disposal authorities. Each was already, and continued to be, responsible for waste collection.

In 2012, French transnational company Veolia was forced to withdraw its tender for £4.7 billion worth of contracts with the NLWA after sustained local opposition due to its involvement in illegal Israeli settlements. The campaign was supported by some Labour Party councillors and the Palestine Solidarity Campaign.

== Role ==
The function of the NLWA is to transport and dispose of waste collected in each of the seven north London boroughs it is responsible for. This is undertaken by a wholly owned subsidiary, LondonWaste Limited.

Its wholly owned subsidiary LondonEnergy Ltd operates the Edmonton EcoPark, and as of July 3rd 2026 the Barrowell Green recycling centre.

== Activities ==
In 2024, the authority published a study which showed that 55% of the residents.

In 2025-2026, there were four fires at the authority's facilities.
