= London Plan =

Development strategy for Greater London

The London Plan
- Cover of the 2016 London Plan
- Author: Mayor of London
- Language: English
- Subject: Statutory planning document of Greater London
- Publisher: Greater London Authority
- Publication date: March 2021
- Publication place: England and United Kingdom
- Media type: Digital (online and PDF)

The London Plan is the statutory spatial development strategy for the Greater London area in the United Kingdom that is written by the Mayor of London and published by the Greater London Authority. It is updated from time to time.

== Mandate ==
The geographical scope of the plan is the Greater London administrative area.

Section 41 of the Greater London Authority Act 1999 (GLA Act 1999) required that the Mayor of London publish publish seven statutory strategies, one of them being the spatial development strategy known as the London Plan. It is required that it deals only with matters that are of strategic importance to Greater London.

The act also requires that the London Plan includes in its scope:

- the health of Londoners,
- equality of opportunity,
- contribution to sustainable development in the United Kingdom.

Section 337 of the GLA Act 1999 enables the government to require that the mayor make certain changes to the draft of the London Plan before it can take effect, through a direction. Section 340 of the GLA Act 1999 states that the government can require the mayor review the London Plan through a direction.

== History ==
Before the London Plan, regional planning guidance for London was issued by the Secretary of State and known as "Regional Planning Guidance 3" (RPG3).

The regional planning document was first published in final form on 10 February 2004. Initially the mayor could only direct a borough to refuse planning permission on the basis of a scheme not complying with the London Plan.

In addition to minor alterations, it was substantially revised and republished in February 2008 and July 2011. In October 2013, minor alterations were made to the plan to comply with the National Planning Policy Framework and other changes in national policy.

The mayor gained new statutory powers following the Greater London Authority Act 2007. The 2007 act allowed the mayor to "take over" planning applications - this power was first exercised in 2009 in relation to Columbus Tower in Tower Hamlets. Due to the powers granted by the 2007 act, the London Plan took on a greater degree of focus on economic policy.

Following the 2008 change of mayor, a new review was initiated in July 2008 and a new London Plan published in July 2011. As of this date, modifications are made to fully comply with the National Planning Policy Framework.

In 2013, London Mayor Boris Johnson proposed early minor alterations to the London Plan that were aimed at preventing boroughs from setting rent caps or targets for affordable rented homes in their local development frameworks. The alterations were approved in a vote by the London Assembly in September 2013.

Following the 2016 change of mayor, London Mayor Sadiq Khan outlined proposals towards creating a new London Plan. The London Plan of March 2016 was published, and amended in January 2017 (for typesetting corrections), with a formal end-date of 2036.

A draft version was published in December 2017, with the final version formally coming into effect on 2 March 2021.

In March 2021 a new London Plan was adopted by the Greater London Authority, planning for the next 20–25 years. There have been a number of amendments to the London Plan which have been incorporated into the current version that was published in February 2008.

== Objectives ==
The plan is a spatial development strategy for the Greater London area and has six objectives.

The original 2004 objectives were:

1. To accommodate London's growth within its boundaries without encroaching on open spaces
2. To make London a better city for people to live in
3. To make London a more prosperous city with strong and diverse economic growth
4. To promote social inclusion and tackle deprivation and discrimination
5. To improve London's accessibility
6. To make London a more attractive, well-designed and green city

— London Plan, 2004

The objectives were updated in 2008 following the Greater London Authority Act 2007:

1. To accommodate London's growth within its boundaries without encroaching on open spaces
2. To make London a healthier and better city for people to live in
3. To make London a more prosperous city with strong and diverse long term economic growth
4. To promote social inclusion and tackle deprivation and discrimination
5. To improve London's accessibility
6. To make London an exemplary world city in mitigating and adapting to climate change and a more attractive, well-designed and green city

— London Plan, 2008

The objectives as adopted by the 2011 and 2016 revisions are to ensure that London is:

1. a city that meets the challenges of economic and population growth
2. an internationally competitive and successful city
3. a city of diverse, strong, secure and accessible neighbourhoods
4. a city that delights the senses
5. a city that becomes a world leader in improving the environment
6. a city where it is easy, safe and convenient for everyone to access jobs, opportunities and facilities

— London Plan, 2011 and 2016

The objectives as adopted of the 2021 London plan, are to ensure that London is:

1. Making the Best Use of Land: To promote the efficient use of land and to meet the needs of a growing population within the finite boundaries of the city.
2. Building Strong and Inclusive Communities: To foster social integration, community engagement, and to ensure that all Londoners have access to quality services and amenities.
3. Creating a Healthy City: To improve the health and well-being of Londoners by addressing environmental and health inequalities.
4. Delivering the Homes Londoners Need: To increase the supply of affordable housing and to cater to the diverse housing needs of the city's residents.
5. Growing a Good Economy: To create opportunities for all Londoners and to ensure that the city’s economy is robust, diverse, and inclusive.
6. Increasing Efficiency and Resilience: To make London more resilient to the challenges of climate change and to increase the efficiency of the city's infrastructure.

— London Plan, 2021

== Policies ==
Different iterations of the London Plan have covered:

- climate change
- energy
- London as a global city
- economic changes
- housing
- social exclusion
- transport including Crossrail and parking
- geography and the sub-regions and inter-regions
- Outer London
- liveability including safety, security and open spaces
- the 2012 Summer Olympics and 2012 Summer Paralympics
- waste management
- waste reduction
- minerals
- data centres

=== Crossrail ===
Crossrail formed a part of the original London Plan - it was originally conceived as part of the planning for transport during the 2012 Summer Olympic and Paralympic Games.

=== Parking ===
The 2021 London Plan required that studios and one-bedroom flats provide one cycle parking space, required that the two-person properties provide 1.5 parking places, and required that two parking spaces be provided by all other residential units.

=== Housing ===
==== Targets for affordable housing ====
The 2004 London Plan included a target that every local authority had to have over half of its new dwellings be "affordable housing". The draft London Plan, published in 2026, replaced the existing proportion-based affordable housing targets with differentiated affordable housing target for each borough.

==== Targets for new or net additional homes ====
- The 2016 London Plan featured a target of 52,000 new homes being built per year.
- The 2021 London Plan contained a target of 52,000 net additional homes being built per year.
- The draft London Plan, released in 2026, contained a target of 88,000 net additional homes being built per year.

==== Gypsy sites ====
The 2008 London Plan included a target for 538 Gypsy sites.

The draft London Plan, published in 2009, suggested increasing this to 1,062. A subsequent draft published in 2010 decreased this target to 238.

=== Energy ===
The Merton rule was devised by the Merton London Borough Council and required that 10% of new housing have "on-site" renewable energy developments. The draft changes to the London Plan, published in December 2006, and the subsequent 2008 London Plan adopted an extension of the Merton rule with a requirement for 20% of new housing to have on-site renewable energy development.

=== Water fountains ===
The draft London Plan, published in December 2017, included a requirement to have water fountains in areas with a significant number of food outlets, with a requirement for local authorities to identify appropriate sites.

The goal of the policy was to reduce usage of disposable plastic bottles, and therefore reduce plastic consumption.

=== Health impact assessments ===
The 2011 London Plan supported the use of health impact assessments.

=== Data centres ===
The draft London Plan, published in 2026, gives data centres unique treatment, describing them as the "only exception" due to the fact that data centres have fewer staff than other industrial developments such as factories and warehouses. The plan contains a requirement to consider energy infrastructure when determining if new developments are allowed to proceed.

=== Opportunity areas ===
Opportunity areas were included in the 2004 London Plan. In every iteration of the London Plan, these areas have been expected to support a minimum of 5,000 new jobs and 2,500 homes.

Opportunity areas are designated for significant high-density development. Opportunity areas are often linked to existing or planned public transport enhancements and aimed at supporting new housing, commercial ventures, and infrastructure improvements. Boroughs use these figures as starting points for policy development and refine them through further assessment. Alongside "strategic areas for regeneration", opportunity areas are intended to support city-wide inclusive growth.

The mayor's role includes ensuring these areas reach their full potential, advocating for investment, and overseeing development that respects the area’s character. Opportunity Area Planning Frameworks guide the initial stages of development.

Different iterations have featured different numbers of opportunity areas:

- The 2004 London Plan featured 28 opportunity areas
- The 2011 London Plan featured 33 opportunity areas
- The 2021 London Plan featured 48 opportunity areas

=== Sub-regions ===
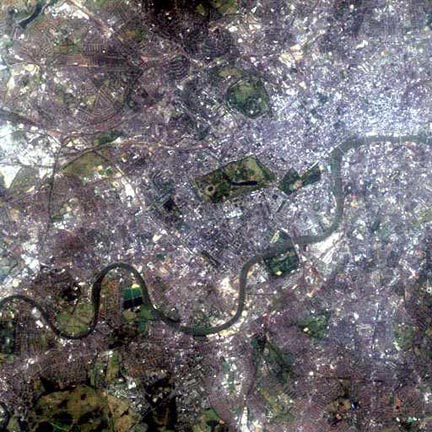
Development must not encroach on green spaces.

For the purposes of the plan, London is divided into five sub-regions. From 2004 to 2008 the sub-regions were initially the same as the Learning and Skills Council areas established in 1999. Within this scheme there was a separate Central sub-region and four others around it. The London part of the Thames Gateway zone was entirely contained within the East London sub-region. The 2004–08 sub-regions each had a sub-regional development framework.

The sub-regions were revised in February 2008 as part of the Further Alterations to the London Plan. These sub-regions each radiated from the centre to combine inner and outer London boroughs. The 2008–11 sub-regions, each had its own Sub Regional Implementation Framework. In proposals for the London Plan published in April 2009, Boris Johnson proposed that there be five sub-regions: central, east, south, west and north.

In 2011 the sub-regions were revised again. A smaller Central sub-region was reintroduced, the South sub-region was reintroduced, and all boroughs in the Thames Gateway were returned to the East sub-region. The 2011 sub-regions are maintained in the 2016 London Plan.

=== Central activities zone ===
The London Plan defines a central activities zone, distinct from the sub-regions, which includes areas with a very high concentration of economic activities.

=== Activity centres ===
Map of international (blue) and metropolitan (red) centres

The London Plan identifies 201 activity centres in the city. All activity centres are categorised into:

- 2 international centres, the West End and Knightsbridge.
- 14 metropolitan centres such as Sutton, Kingston, Bromley, Ealing, Stratford, and Canary Wharf
- 36 major centres such as Brixton, Dalston, Eltham and Kilburn
- 149 district centres such as Camberwell, West Hampstead and Whitechapel.

Smaller local and neighbourhood centres are also referred to in the plan but are not listed.

International centres (2)	Knightsbridge, West End
Metropolitan centres (14)	Bromley, Canary Wharf, Croydon, Ealing, Harrow, Hounslow, Ilford, Kingston, Romford, Shepherd's Bush, Stratford, Sutton, Uxbridge, Wood Green
Major centres (36)	Angel, Barking, Bexleyheath, Brixton, Camden Town, Canada Water, Catford, Chiswick, Clapham Junction, Dalston, East Ham, Edgware, Elephant and Castle/Walworth Road, Eltham, Enfield Town, Fulham, Hackney Central, Hammersmith, Kensington High Street, Kilburn, King's Road (East), Lewisham, Nag's Head, Orpington, Peckham, Putney, Queensway/Westbourne Grove, Richmond, Southall, Streatham, Tooting, Walthamstow, Wandsworth, Wembley, Wimbledon, Woolwich

== Timeline ==
Date	Document
June 2002	Initial draft of the London Plan
February 2004	The London Plan 2004 (Note: Short title.)
October 2005	Draft Alterations to the London Plan: Housing Provision Targets Waste and Minerals
December 2005	Reviewing the London Plan: Statement of Intent from the Mayor
September 2006	Draft Further Alterations to the London Plan
December 2006	Early Alterations to the London Plan on Housing provision targets, waste and minerals
February 2008	The London Plan 2008
July 2008	Planning for a better London
April 2009	A new plan for London: Proposals for the Mayor's London Plan
October 2009	The London Plan: Consultation draft replacement plan
December 2009	Examination in public on minor alteration to the consultation draft replacement London Plan, due to Crossrail.
April 2010	Crossrail alterations take effect.
July 2011	The London Plan 2011
February 2012	Early Minor Alterations to the London Plan
October 2013	Revised Early Minor Alterations to the London Plan
March 2015	Further Alterations to the London Plan
March 2016 (typsetting corrections January 2017)	The London Plan 2016
December 2017	Draft version of the updated London Plan released for consultation.
August 2018	Minor changes published.
March 2021	The London Plan 2021
July 2026	Draft version of the updated London Plan released for consultation.

== See also ==
- London Strategic Licensing Policy
