= Western Riverside Waste Authority =

Agency overview
- Formed: 1 April 1986
- Preceding agency: Greater London Council
- Jurisdiction: London boroughs of Wandsworth, Lambeth Hammersmith and Fulham, Kensington and Chelsea
- Website: wrwa.gov.uk

The Western Riverside Waste Authority is the statutory body responsible for waste disposal in the London boroughs of Wandsworth, Lambeth, Hammersmith and Fulham, and Kensington and Chelsea. The authority was formed in 1986, taking over functions previously held by the Greater London Council, and is overseen by an elected councillor from each of the boroughs in which it operates.

== History ==
The authority was established in 1986 as a joint arrangement under the Local Government Act 1985. The authority replaced the Greater London Council in relation to waste disposal in part of central London.

The authority delivered a scheme, called the London Reuse Network, in partnership with the London Waste and Recycling Board and the London Community Resource Network, where individuals could give away reusable household items.

== Waste processing ==
The authority is responsible for managing the Cringle Dock waste transfer station. The authority manages the Smugglers Way materials recycling facility in Wandsworth.
