= West London Waste Authority =

Agency overview
- Formed: 1 April 1986
- Preceding agency: Greater London Council
- Jurisdiction: London boroughs of Brent, Ealing, Harrow, Hillingdon, Hounslow, Richmond upon Thames
- Headquarters: Unit 6, The Green, West Drayton, UB7 7PN
- Agency executives: Councillor Graham Henson (Lab), Chair of Authority; Emma Beal, Managing Director
- Website: www.westlondonwaste.gov.uk

The West London Waste Authority is the statutory body responsible for waste disposal in the London boroughs of Brent, Ealing, Harrow, Hillingdon, Hounslow and Richmond upon Thames. The authority was formed in 1986, taking over functions previously held by the Greater London Council, and is overseen by an elected councillor from each of the boroughs in which it operates.

== History ==
The waste authority was established on 1 April 1986 as a joint arrangement under part II of the Local Government Act 1985. It replaced the Greater London Council in part of west London. The establishment of joint committees for this purpose was voluntary. The boroughs could have become individual waste disposal authorities. Each was already, and continued to be, responsible for waste collection.

== Waste processing ==
The majority (96%) of residual waste (waste that cannot be recycled) produced in the area that the authority covers is sent by rail to be incinerated at Energy Recovery Facilities, providing energy for the National Grid. Most of this is processed sent by rail to Suez's Severnside plant in South Gloucestershire, the remainder is processed by Viridor at its shared Lakeside EfW facility near Heathrow Airport. The remaining waste is sent to landfill.

Suez Recycling and Recovery UK (formerly SITA UK) has provided the service to the authority since it signed a £760 million public-private partnership contract in November 2013 to last 25 years.
