= Greater London Development Plan =

Structure plan for Greater London

The Greater London Development Plan was a development plan developed by the Greater London Council.

== Background ==
The London Government Act 1963 enabled the Greater London Council to create a development plan for Greater London. The development of the plan preceded the Town and Country Planning Act 1968, and was originally conducted under the Town and Country Planning Act 1947, but it became a "structure plan" under the 1968 act. The regulations under the 1968 act explicitly state that the GLDP was to be treated as a structure plan under it.

== Development ==
Initially the government had wanted the plan to be submitted by March 1967, but it was delayed.

The Greater London Development Plan was first submitted to the Minister for Housing and Local Government in August 1969. The plan was published in draft form in December 1969. The plan was approved by the government in July 1976.

A review was conducted in 1978, and a draft was published in 1984, but the Department for the Environment refused to approve it.

== Content ==
The plans contain a statement that it was an evolutionary and flexible plan.

The plan contained details of where different office locations in London were located, but it contained limited details of where different office blocks were located.

The plan included the construction of four ring roads, known as the London Ringways, but this was largely abandoned. The plan introduced the term "metropolitan open land" to designate green space for protection.

== Implementation ==
Under the 1963 act, every local authority became required to publish a local development plan which was consistent with the development plan for Greater London. Under the 1968 act, it became the only structure plan for Greater London.
