= Local Government Act 1985 =

Act of the Parliament of the United Kingdom

Local Government Act 1985 (Note: Section 106(1).)
- Act of Parliament
- Parliament of the United Kingdom
- Long title: An Act to abolish the Greater London Council and the metropolitan county councils; to transfer their functions to the local authorities in their areas and, in some cases, to other bodies; and to provide for other matters consequential on, or connected with, the abolition of those councils.
- Citation: 1985 c. 51
- Territorial extent: England and Wales (Note: Section 106(2).)

Dates
- Royal assent: 16 July 1985
- Commencement: 16 July 1985 (except part II); 1 April 1985 (part II) (Note: Section 2.)
Other legislation
Amends	Metropolitan Commons Act 1878; Town Development Act 1952; Fire Services Act 1959; Weeds Act 1959; London Government Act 1963; Administration of Justice Act 1964; Museum of London Act 1965; Gas Act 1965; Commons Registration Act 1965; Employers' Liability (Compulsory Insurance) Act 1969; Pensions (Increase) Act 1971; Rent Act 1977; Refuse Disposal (Amenity) Act 1978; Public Passenger Vehicles Act 1981; Zoo Licensing Act 1981; Litter Act 1983; Public Health (Control of Disease) Act 1984; Road Traffic Regulation Act 1984; County Courts Act 1984; Rates Act 1984
Amended by	Housing (Consequential Provisions) Act 1985; Weights and Measures Act 1985; Landlord and Tenant Act 1987; Coroners Act 1988; Road Traffic (Consequential Provisions) Act 1988; Planning (Consequential Provisions) Act 1990; Food Safety Act 1990; Water Consolidation (Consequential Provisions) Act 1991; Probation Service Act 1993; Statute Law (Repeals) Act 1993; Employment Tribunals Act 1996; Employment Rights Act 1996; Justices of the Peace Act 1997; Audit Commission Act 1998; Statute Law (Repeals) Act 1998; Statute Law (Repeals) Act 2004; Cities and Local Government Devolution Act 2016; Policing and Crime Act 2017

Status: Amended

Text of statute as originally enacted

Revised text of statute as amended

Text of the Local Government Act 1985 as in force today (including any amendments) within the United Kingdom, from legislation.gov.uk.

English metropolitan county councils abolished by the Local Government Act 1985

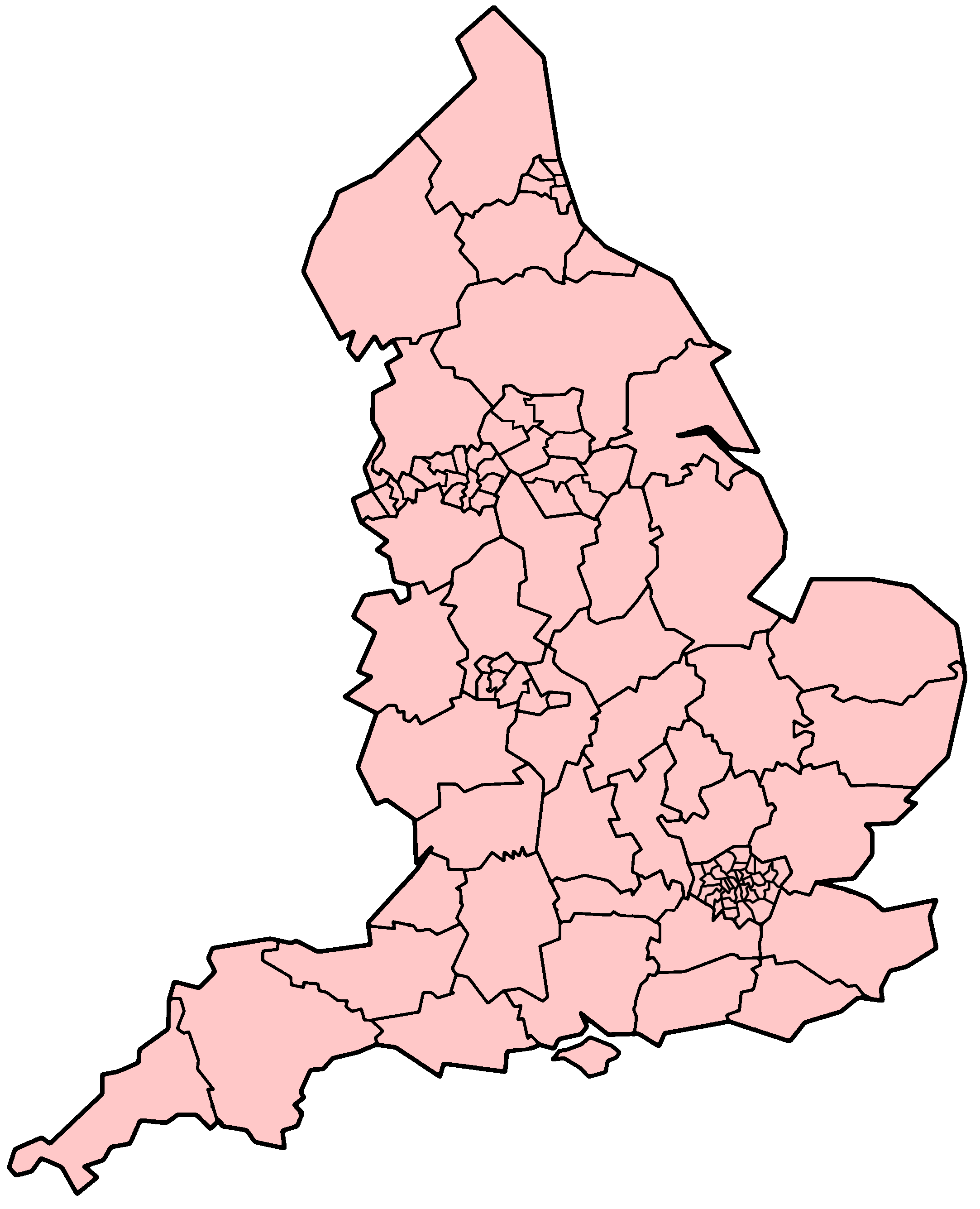
Principal local authorities in England after the passing of the act

The Local Government Act 1985 (c. 51) is an act of the Parliament of the United Kingdom. Its main effect was to abolish the six county councils of the metropolitan counties that had been set up by the Local Government Act 1972, along with the Greater London Council that had been established in 1965. In their place many single purpose authorities known collectively as 'joint authorities' were established for fire service, police and passenger transport. An ad hoc education authority was established for Inner London and a planning authority for Greater London. The legislation permitted councils to form 'joint arrangements' for waste disposal and other services that they wished to provide together. Time-limited residuary bodies were created to dispose of the assets of the former authorities.

== Background ==
Following the victory of the Conservative Party at the 1979 general election, Margaret Thatcher's government were involved in a series of high-profile disputes with the GLC and Metropolitan County Councils. All of the authorities were controlled by, or came under the control of the opposition Labour Party during Thatcher's first term. The Conservative manifesto for the 1983 general election pledged their abolition, describing the councils as "a wasteful and unnecessary tier of government". After winning that election in a landslide, the government then published a white paper in October of that year, Streamlining the cities. Its proposals formed the basis of the Local Government Bill.

=== Streamlining the Cities white paper ===
The Streamlining the Cities white paper argued that most local services in Greater London and in the six metropolitan counties, were provided by the London boroughs, and by the Metropolitan district councils. Specifically, GLC and the MCCs only provided 16% and 26% of services in their areas respectively - however the shire county councils provided 87% of services in their areas. The white paper concluded therefore, that the latter's existence could be justified, whereas the GLC and the MCCs could not. It was also claimed that the GLC and the MCCs were profligate. The white paper concluded that the GLC and the MCCs should be abolished and replaced by a system of joint boards, to take over some of the county council's functions. However, it was controversial as the GLC and MCCs were controlled by the Labour Party and led to accusations that their abolition was motivated by party politics.

== Provisions ==
The core provision, section 1, stated that "the Greater London Council; and the metropolitan county councils" shall cease to exist. It came into effect on 1 April 1986, with some powers being devolved to the metropolitan boroughs themselves and London boroughs and others to joint authorities (such as for fire or police purposes) consisting of members of each of the metropolitan district councils within each county. At the time of the Act, one third of the population of England were living in Greater London and the metropolitan counties.

Time-limited residuary bodies were created to handle the disposal of the councils' assets. Part III of the Act also set up the Inner London Education Authority, which had previously been a committee of the GLC responsible for education in Inner London, as a directly elected body. This was to remain in existence for only three years.

The Local Government Act 1972 allowed councils to voluntarily form joint committees to provide services together and the Local Government Act 1985 extended this principle by directing local authorities to form some shared arrangements whilst permitting them to form others as they wished.

=== Local authorities abolished by Part I ===
Six metropolitan county councils were abolished and the local authority of Greater London.

- Greater London Council
- Greater Manchester County Council
- Merseyside County Council
- South Yorkshire County Council
- Tyne and Wear County Council
- West Midlands County Council
- West Yorkshire County Council

=== Joint committees established by Part II ===
- Joint planning committee for Greater London
- Greater Manchester Trading Standards Joint Committee
- Merseyside County Trading Standards Joint Committee
- South Yorkshire Trading Standards Joint Committee
- Tyne and Wear Trading Standards Joint Committee
- West Midlands Trading Standards Joint Committee
- West Yorkshire Trading Standards Joint Committee

=== Joint arrangements established by Part II ===
- East London Waste Authority
- Greater Manchester Waste Disposal Authority
- Merseyside Waste Disposal Authority
- North London Waste Authority
- Western Riverside Waste Authority
- West London Waste Authority

=== Ad hoc authorities established by Part III ===
- Inner London Education Authority

Note: The outer London borough councils and metropolitan district councils were already education authorities.

=== Joint authorities established by Part IV ===
A number of single purpose authorities were established, collectively known as joint authorities in the legislation.

Fire and civil defence authorities

- Greater Manchester Fire and Civil Defence Authority
- London Fire and Civil Defence Authority
- Merseyside Fire and Civil Defence Authority
- South Yorkshire Fire and Civil Defence Authority
- Tyne and Wear Fire and Civil Defence Authority
- West Midlands Fire and Civil Defence Authority
- West Yorkshire Fire and Civil Defence Authority

Passenger transport authorities

- Greater Manchester Passenger Transport Authority
- Merseyside Passenger Transport Authority
- South Yorkshire Passenger Transport Authority
- Tyne and Wear Passenger Transport Authority
- West Midlands Passenger Transport Authority
- West Yorkshire Passenger Transport Authority

Note: London Regional Transport was established separately by the London Regional Transport Act 1984.

Police authorities

- Greater Manchester Police Authority
- Merseyside Police Authority
- Northumbria Police Authority
- South Yorkshire Police Authority
- West Midlands Police Authority
- West Yorkshire Police Authority

Note: The Metropolitan Police was under the control of the Home Office and unaffected by the legislation.

=== Ad hoc bodies established by Part V ===
- London Boroughs Grants Committee

=== Residuary bodies established by Part VII ===
- Greater Manchester Residuary Body
- London Residuary Body
- Merseyside Residuary Body
- South Yorkshire Residuary Body
- Tyne and Wear Residuary Body
- West Midlands Residuary Body
- West Yorkshire Residuary Body

=== Ad hoc bodies established by Part IX ===
- London Research Centre
