= Greater London Authority Act 2007 =

Act of the Parliament of the United Kingdom

Greater London Authority Act 2007 (Note: Section 59(1).)
- Act of Parliament
- Parliament of the United Kingdom
- Long title: An Act to make further provision with respect to the Greater London Authority; to amend the Greater London Authority Act 1999; to make further provision with respect to the functional bodies, within the meaning of that Act, and the Museum of London; and for connected purposes.
- Citation: 2007 c. 24
- Introduced by: Ruth Kelly MP, Secretary of State for Communities and Local Government (Commons); Baroness Andrews (Lords)
- Territorial extent: England and Wales (Note: Section 59(3).)

Dates
- Royal assent: 23 October 2007
- Commencement: Various (Note: Section 59(4)–(7).)
Other legislation
Amends	Museum of London Act 1965; Town and Country Planning Act 1990; Planning (Hazardous Substances) Act 1990; Greater London Authority Act 1999; Railways Act 2005
Amended by	Localism Act 2011; Policing and Crime Act 2017

Status: Amended

History of passage through Parliament

Text of statute as originally enacted

Revised text of statute as amended

The Greater London Authority Act 2007 (c. 24) is an act of the Parliament of the United Kingdom.

It gave additional powers to the Greater London Authority, the London Assembly and the Mayor of London, which had been created by the Greater London Authority Act 1999.

== Provisions ==
The act gave the Mayor of London broad powers in relation to planning, housing, large developments, skills, training, waste and climate change.

The act also gives the mayor broad powers relating to the power of appointment to the boards of functional bodies, including the ability to make party political appointments to Transport for London. The act required that the mayor's appointments be subjects to a confirmation hearing. These confirmation hearings are non-binding.

The mayor must have due regard to remarks made by the assembly.

The act provides for the following:

- establishment of a London Board for the Housing Corporation
- establishment of the London Skills and Employment Board
- establishment of the London Waste and Recycling Board
- publication of a London housing strategy
- publication of a London health inequalities strategy

The act strengthened the assembly's powers scrutinise the Mayor and changed other aspects of the governance of the Greater London Authority.

The act allowed the mayor to call-in planning applications.

The act transferred responsibility for the Museum of London from being jointly managed by the Department for Culture, Media and Sport and the City of London Corporation to the Greater London Authority.
