= Fire authority =

In England and Wales a fire authority or fire and rescue authority is a statutory body made up of a committee of local councillors which oversees the policy and service delivery of a fire and rescue service. Prior to the Fire Services Act 2004 many fire and rescue authorities were known as fire and civil defence authorities; this designation is no longer used.

A combined fire authority (CFA) is one created by a statutory instrument to cover more than one local authority area. Usually each of the constituent local authorities appoints a fixed number of members of the CFA, depending on their relative populations.

== Constitution ==
A fire authority is made up of either councillors, officers or representatives from the local principal councils in the geographical area that the fire service operates. In the case of the London Fire and Emergency Planning Authority, there is an additional layer of governance above in the form of the London Assembly.

The responsible central government department in England is the Ministry of Housing, Communities and Local Government, previously the Home Office had responsibility until April 1, 2025. Responsibility for Fire and Rescue Services in Wales is devolved to the Welsh Government.

== Role of a fire authority ==
In simple terms a local fire authority is a supervisory body which ensures that a local fire service performs efficiently and in the best interest of the public and community it serves. It means therefore that the fire service is answerable for its actions and performance to the general public. One of its main functions is to collect funding from each local council via a precept - a portion of council tax allocated to the FRS.

== Powers of a fire authority ==
Although a fire safety officer is an employee of the fire service and is authorised and answerable to the Chief Fire Officer to exercise powers of inspection, any enforcement or prosecution action taken against organisations by the fire service is brought in the name of the fire authority, under the Regulatory Reform (Fire Safety) Order 2005.

The fire service's powers of entry and other operational roles are defined by the Fire and Rescue Services Act 2004 This act provides the legal basis for fire authorities to carry out community rather than legislative fire safety functions.

There are many specific acts of parliament which deal with fire safety, inspection and enforcement; in October 2006 (later than anticipated), many outdated acts were repealed, and placed under the umbrella of the Regulatory Reform (Fire Safety) Order 2005.

- Comprehensive list of recent UK fire and rescue service legislation:
- More detailed information on fire authority funding

== See also ==
- Fire service in the United Kingdom
- Police authority
- Women in firefighting
- National Fire Savers Credit Union
