= Lord Lieutenant of the City of London =

Honorary office held by a commission

The City of London is unique in that the post of lord-lieutenant is held in commission. The Lord Mayor of the City of London is the head of the Commission of Lieutenancy.

== Lieutenants ==
All current members were appointed on 24 December 2021 by letters patent under the Great Seal.

The Lieutenancy has a number of ex officio members. These members are currently:

- The Lord Mayor of London
  - Currently: Nicholas Lyons
- Past Lord Mayors who are still Aldermen
  - Currently: Ian Luder, Nick Anstee, Sir David Wootton, Sir Alan Yarrow, Sir Andrew Parmley, Sir Charles Bowman, Sir Peter Estlin, Sir William Russel
- The senior Alderman below the Chair
  - Currently: Nicholas Lyons
- The Recorder of London
  - Currently: Mark Lucraft
- The Common Serjeant of London
  - Currently: Richard Marks
- The Governor of the Bank of England
  - Currently: Andrew Bailey
- The head of another major financial institution
  - Currently: Dame Elizabeth Corley (chair of the board of the Impact Investing Institute)
- The Commissioner of the City of London Police
  - Currently: Angela McLaren (Note: Commissions of Lieutenancy run from Christmas to Christmas every year; as a result, Angela McLaren has not been formally appointed as a Lieutenant as she became Commissioner in January 2022)
- Chair of the City of London Reserve Forces' and Cadets' Association
  - Currently: Paul Hill
