= London Troops War Memorial =

War memorial in the City of London

- United Kingdom
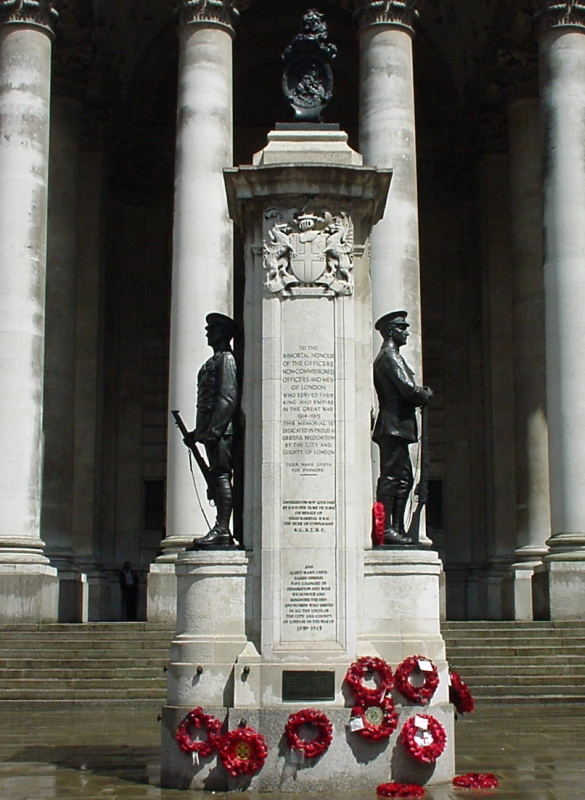
- The memorial in 2010
- For Men of London who fought in World War I and World War II
- Unveiled: 12 November 1920
- Location: 51.513508°N 0.088057°W; Royal Exchange near City of London
- Designed by: Alfred Drury
- TO THE // IMMORTAL HONOUR // OF THE OFFICERS // NON-COMMISSIONED // OFFICERS AND MEN // OF LONDON // WHO SERVED THEIR // KING AND EMPIRE // IN THE GREAT WAR // 1914–1919 // THIS MEMORIAL IS // DEDICATED IN PROUD & // GRATEFUL RECOGNITION // BY THE CITY AND // COUNTY OF LONDON THEIR NAME LIVETH FOR EVERMORE. UNVEILED ON NOV 12TH 1920 BY // H.R.H. THE DUKE OF YORK // ON BEHALF OF // FIELD MARSHAL H.R.H. //THE DUKE OF CONNAUGHT // K.G., K.T., K.P. AND // ALBEIT MANY UNITS // NAMED HEREON // HAVE CHANGED IN // DESIGNATION AND ROLE // WE HONOUR AND // REMEMBER THE MEN // AND WOMEN WHO SERVED // IN ALL THE UNITS OF // THE CITY AND COUNTY // OF LONDON IN THE WAR OF // 1939–1945.

The London Troops War Memorial, located in front of the Royal Exchange in the City of London, commemorates the men of London who fought in World War I and World War II.

== Description ==
The memorial consists of a Portland stone column approximately 7.5 metres (25 ft) high, with buttress plinths, on a granite base, and attached bronze sculptures. On each of the buttress plinths, to the north and south of the central column, is a life-size bronze statue of a soldier standing at ease with a rifle, one representing the Royal Fusiliers and the other the Royal Field Artillery. The column is surmounted by a bronze lion rampant bearing a medallion of Saint George and the Dragon, with the legend "St George for England".

The west side of the central column bears a carving of the coat of arms of the City of London, above dedicatory inscriptions. The east side bears the arms of the County of London above a list of the London regiments that were engaged in the First and Second World Wars: the Royal Fusiliers (City of London) Regiment, the Honourable Artillery Company, four units of the City of London Yeomanry and County of London Yeomanry, eight London brigades of the Royal Field Artillery and two batteries of the Royal Garrison Artillery, units of the Royal Engineers, 28 battalions of the London Regiment (1st to 25th, 28th, 33rd and 34th), and London units of the Royal Army Service Corps, Royal Army Medical Corps, Royal Army Veterinary Corps, Territorial Force Nursing Service, and Voluntary Aid Detachments. Most served with the 56th (1st London) Division, 47th (2nd London) Division, or 58th (London) Division, mainly on the Western Front, or with the 60th (London) Division on the Western Front and then in Salonika and Egypt. Behind the bronze soldiers, the north and south sides of the stone column each bear carvings of three flags, with each flagpole topped by a crown and a wreath.

== Construction ==
The sculptor of the bronze figures was Alfred Drury, with the bronzes cast at the Albion Art Foundry. The stone-carver and letterer was William Silver Frith, and the architect was Sir Aston Webb, who was President of the Royal Academy from 1919 to 1925. Webb's original proposal, including masts standing 75 feet (23 m) high bearing the Royal Standard and the flag of the City of London, and statues representing Peace and Victory, was rejected by the Court of Common Council, but his second design was accepted. The budgeted £7,000 for the memorial was raised by public subscription.

To create space for the memorial in front of the Royal Exchange, a drinking fountain was moved to Cornhill, where it replaced a statue of Sir Rowland Hill, which was moved to St Martin's le Grand,

== Unveiling ==
The memorial was unveiled in front of a large crowd on a foggy day, 12 November 1920, the day after the ceremony to bury the Unknown Warrior at Westminster Abbey. Prince Arthur, Duke of Connaught and Strathearn was scheduled to unveil the memorial, but he was indisposed and was represented by Prince Albert, Duke of York. A guard of honour and military band came from the 3rd Battalion Grenadier Guards, with a march-past of detachments from London military units.

For some year after the memorial was unveiled, the clerks at the Bank of England nearby took upon themselves the task of maintaining the floral tributes left at the memorial. Copper replicas of the memorial were presented to the London units represented on the memorial in 1923.

It became a Grade II listed building in June 1972, upgraded to Grade II* in June 2016 for the centenary of the Battle of the Somme.

== Inscriptions ==
TO THE // IMMORTAL HONOUR // OF THE OFFICERS // NON-COMMISSIONED // OFFICERS AND MEN // OF LONDON // WHO SERVED THEIR // KING AND EMPIRE // IN THE GREAT WAR // 1914–1919 // THIS MEMORIAL IS // DEDICATED IN PROUD & // GRATEFUL RECOGNITION // BY THE CITY AND // COUNTY OF LONDON

THEIR NAME LIVETH FOR EVERMORE.

UNVEILED ON NOV 12TH 1920 BY // H.R.H. THE DUKE OF YORK // ON BEHALF OF // FIELD MARSHAL H.R.H. //THE DUKE OF CONNAUGHT // K.G., K.T., K.P.

AND // ALBEIT MANY UNITS // NAMED HEREON // HAVE CHANGED IN // DESIGNATION AND ROLE // WE HONOUR AND // REMEMBER THE MEN // AND WOMEN WHO SERVED // IN ALL THE UNITS OF // THE CITY AND COUNTY // OF LONDON IN THE WAR OF // 1939–1945.

A brass plaque reads: "Raised by public subscription at the Mansion House in the peace year 1919 during the mayoralty of Col. The Rt. Hon., Sir Horace Brooks Marshall, K.C.V.O., LL.D." The brass plaque was added after 1945, replacing original wording that was removed from the column when a further dedication was added after the Second World War.

== Details ==
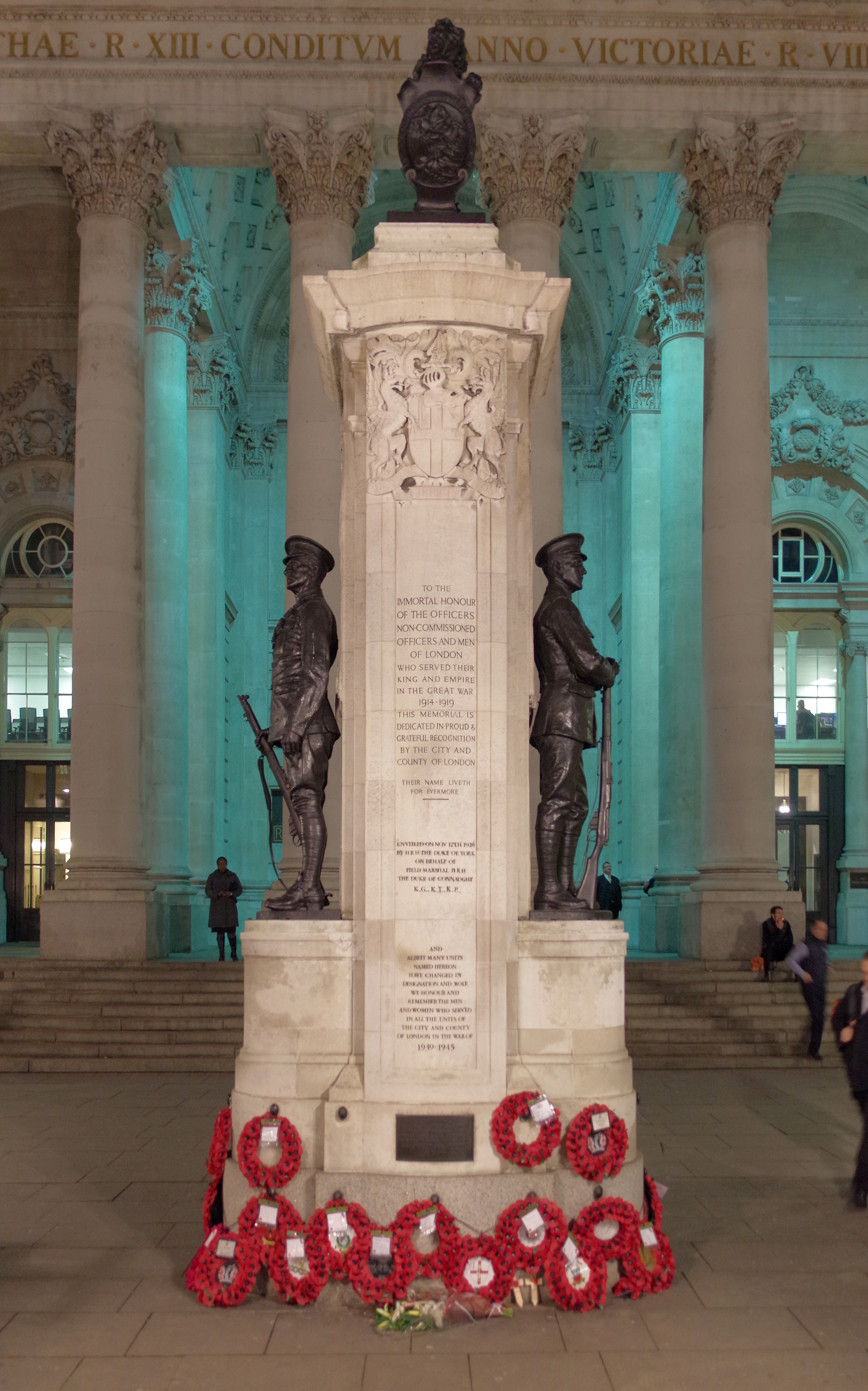
The memorial in December 2014

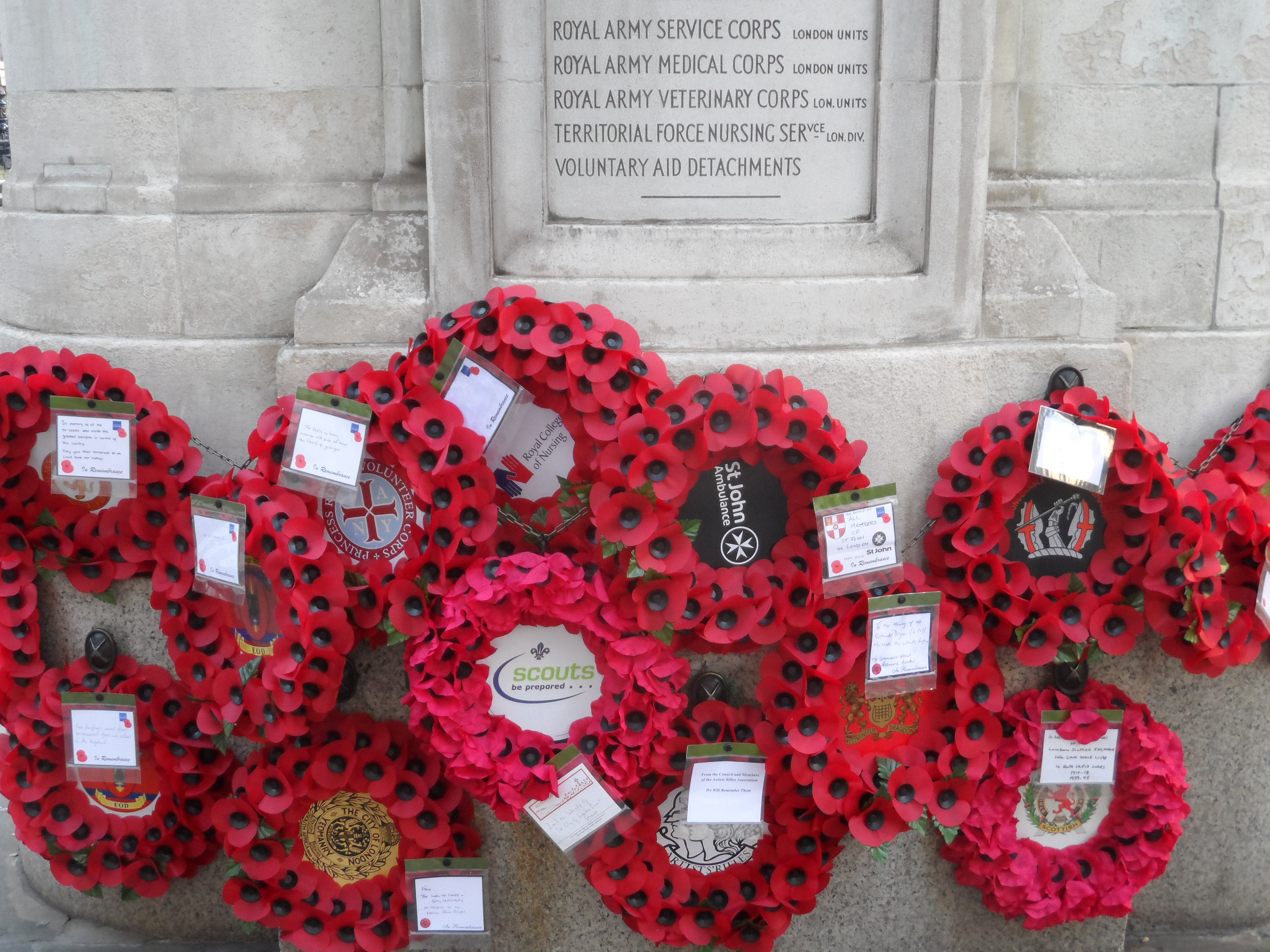
Poppy wreaths laid in November 2016

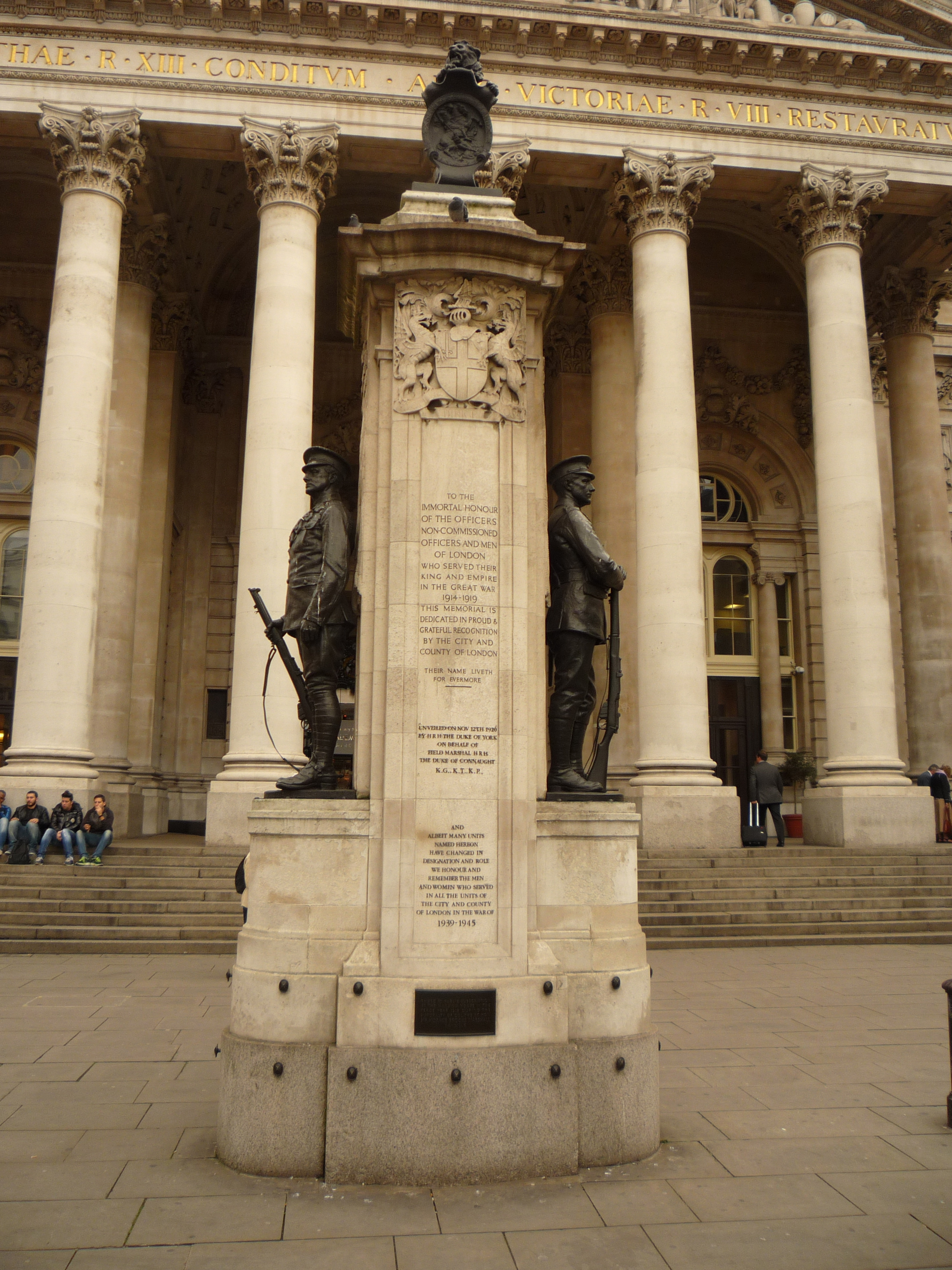
London Troops memorial, Royal Exchange behind (western side, front view looking east)

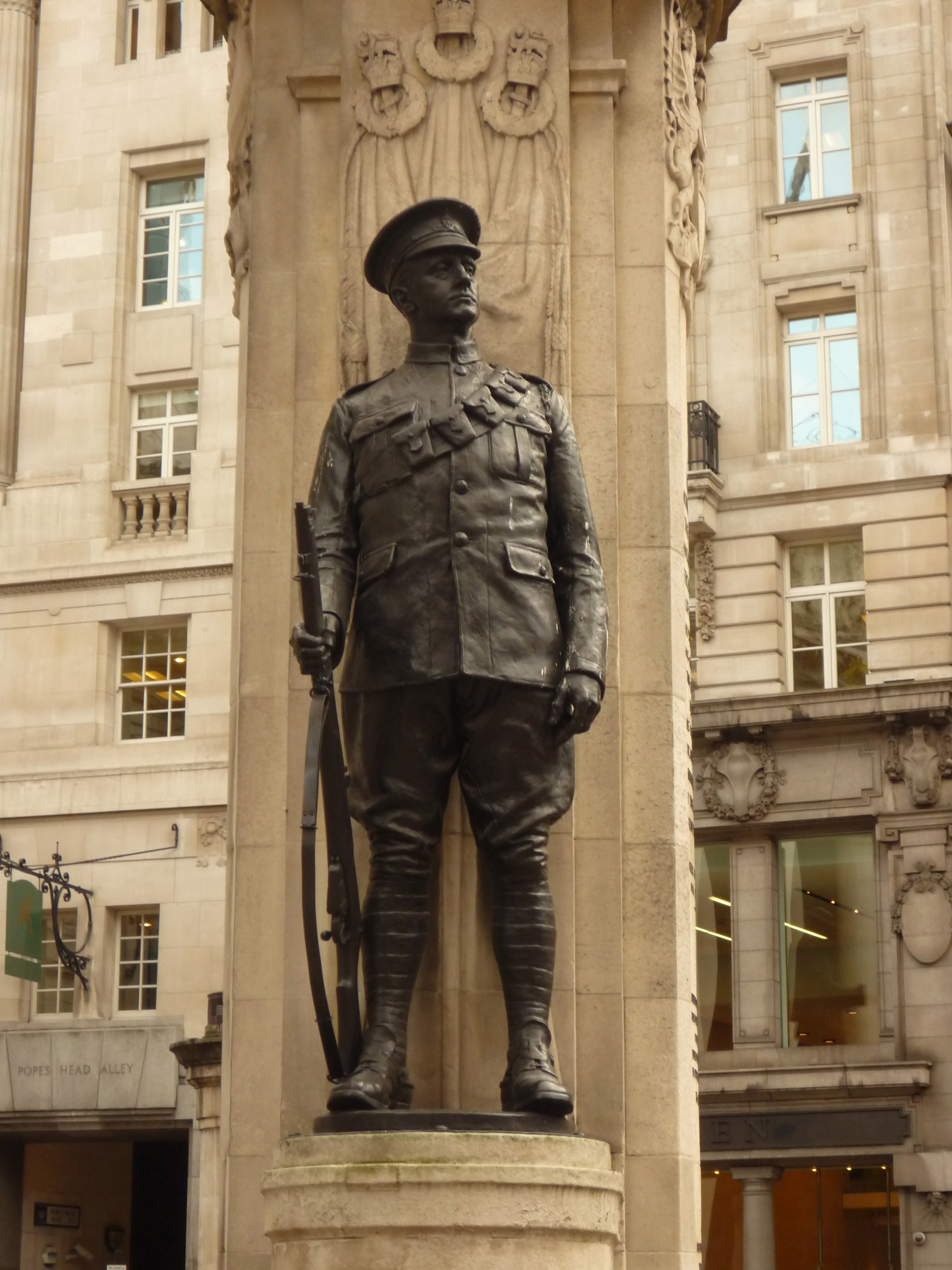
London Troops memorial, Artillery figure (north)

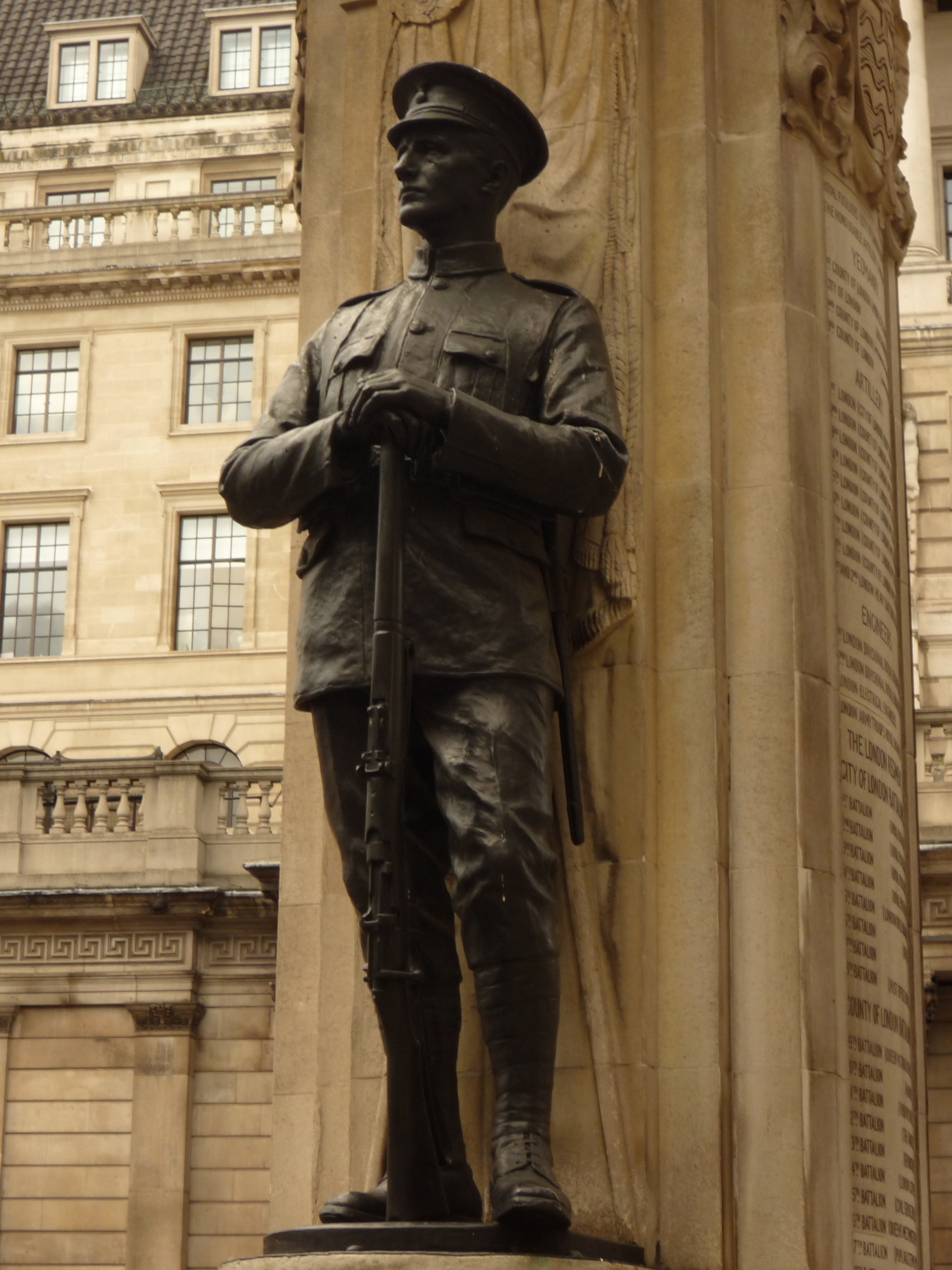
London Troops memorial, Infantry figure (south)

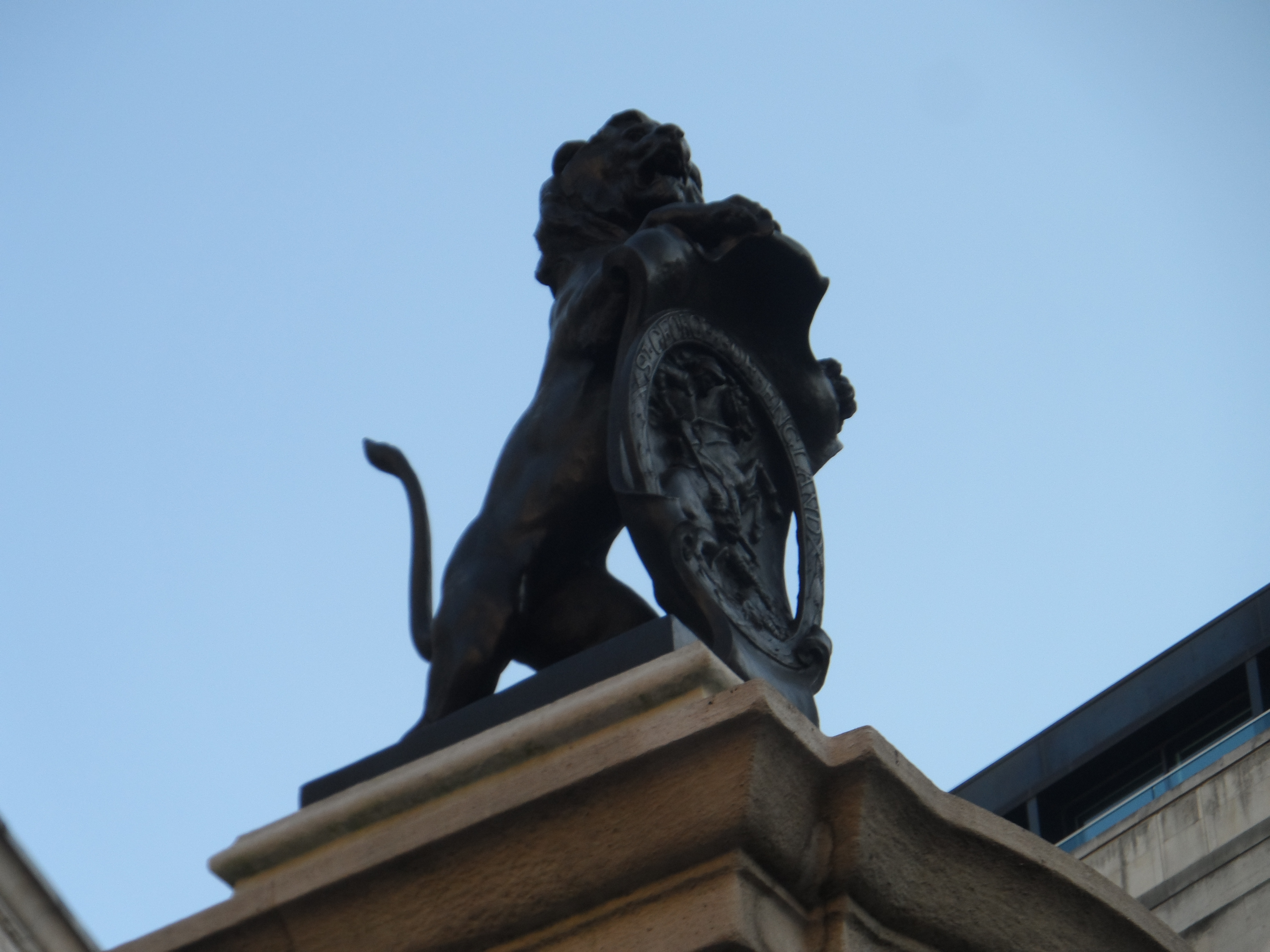
Lion sculpture on top of the memorial

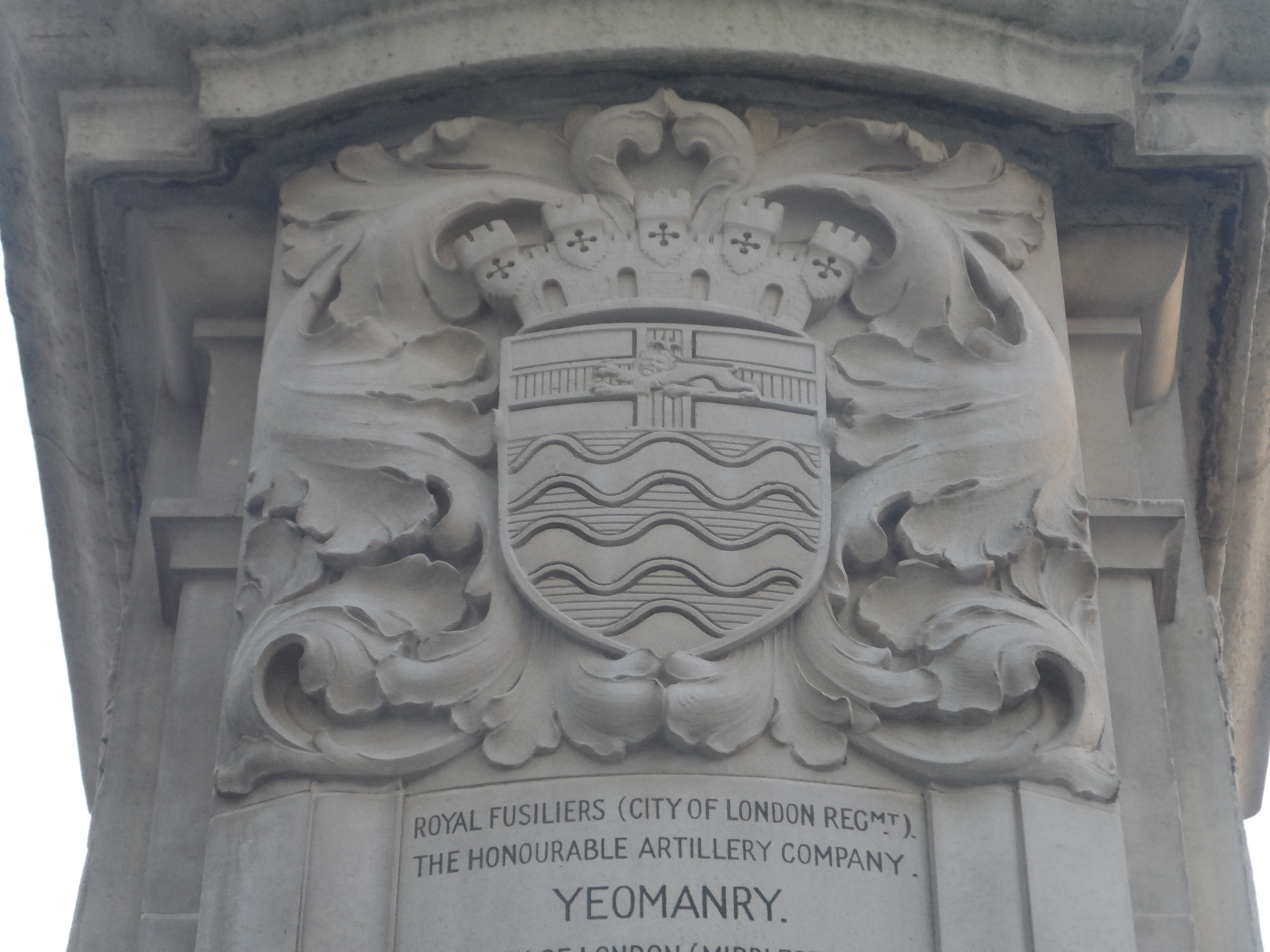
Coat of arms of the County of London on the memorial

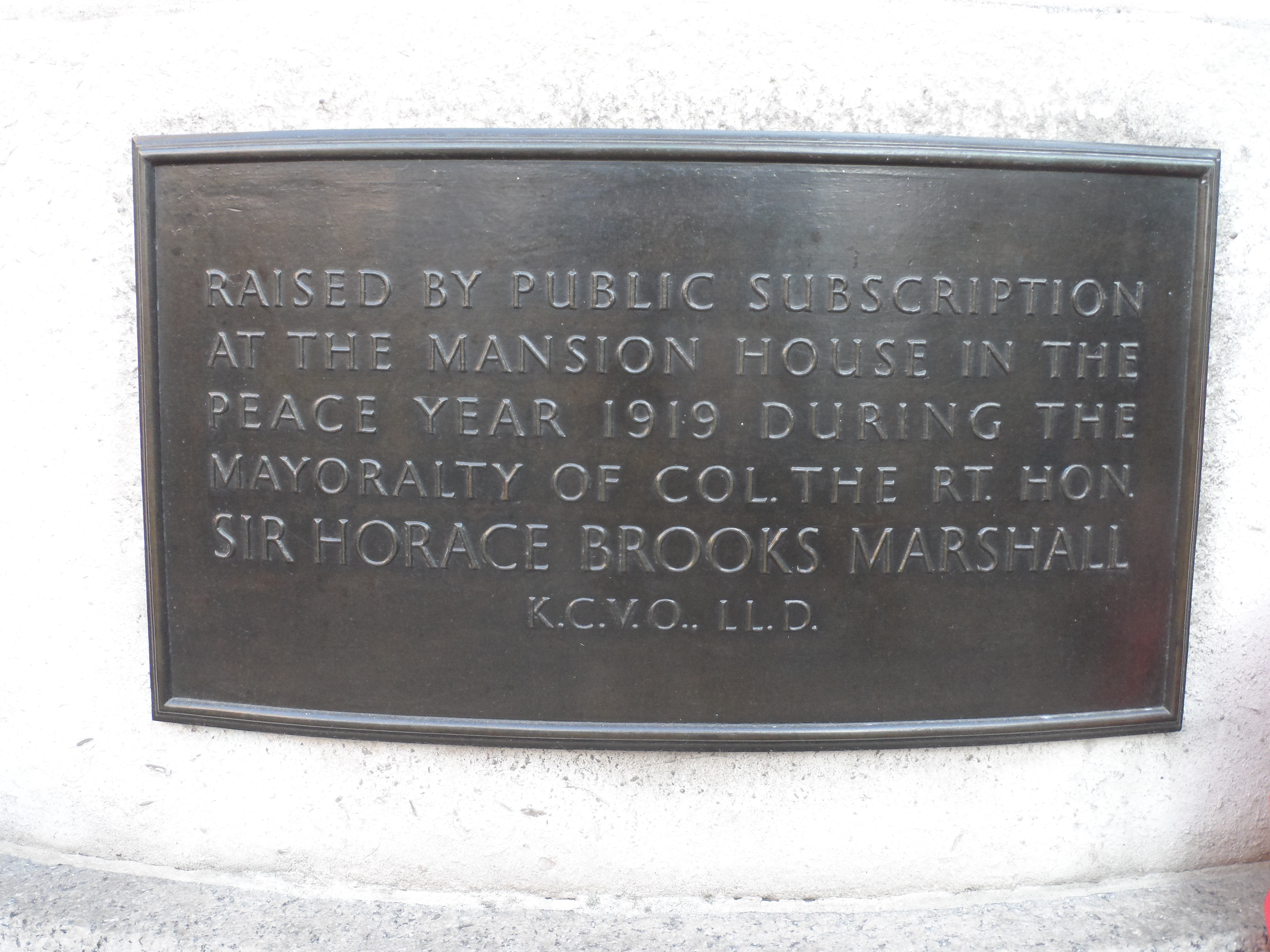
Plaque referring to the mayoralty of Horace Brooks Marshall

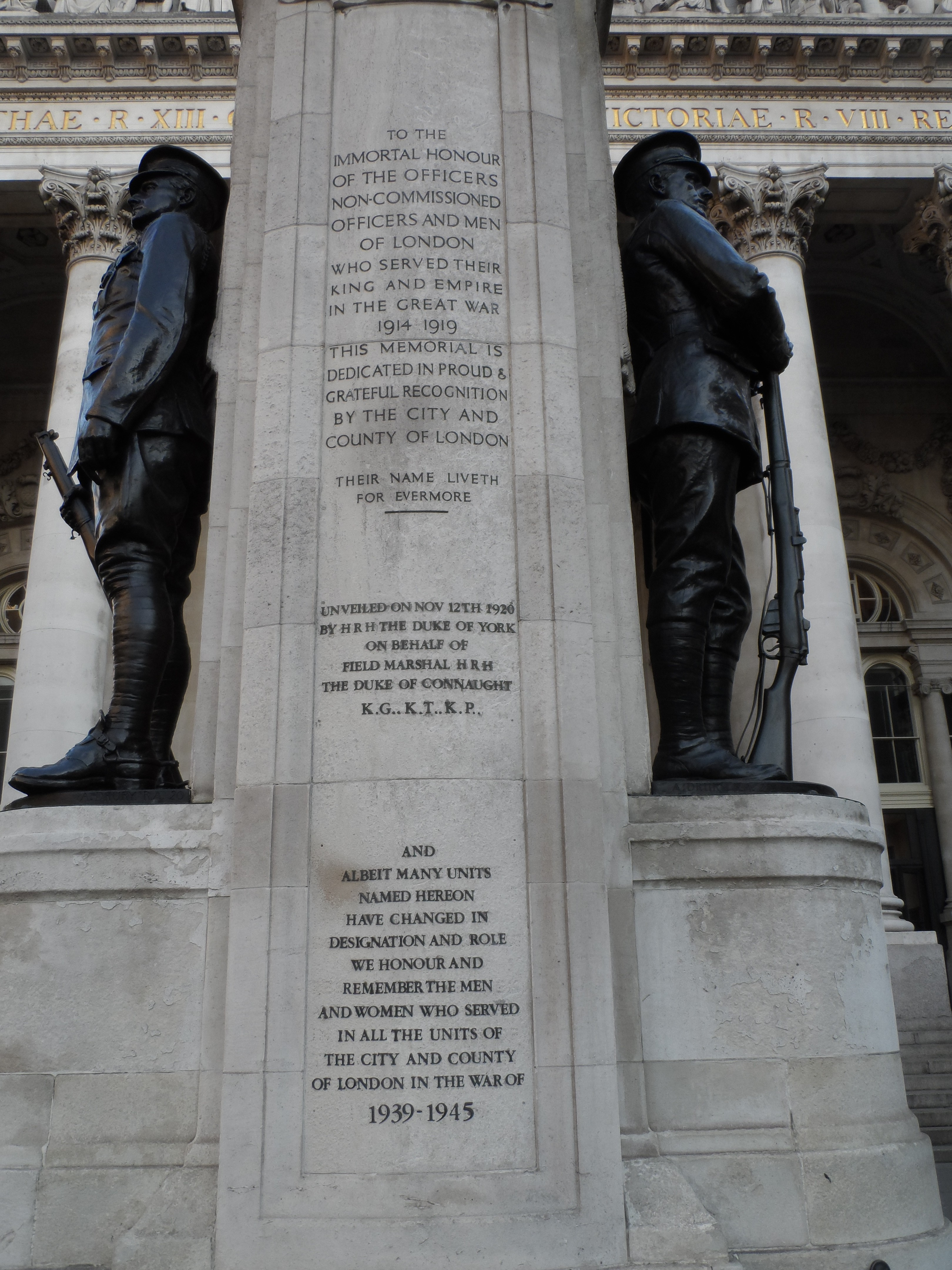
Main inscription on the western side of the memorial

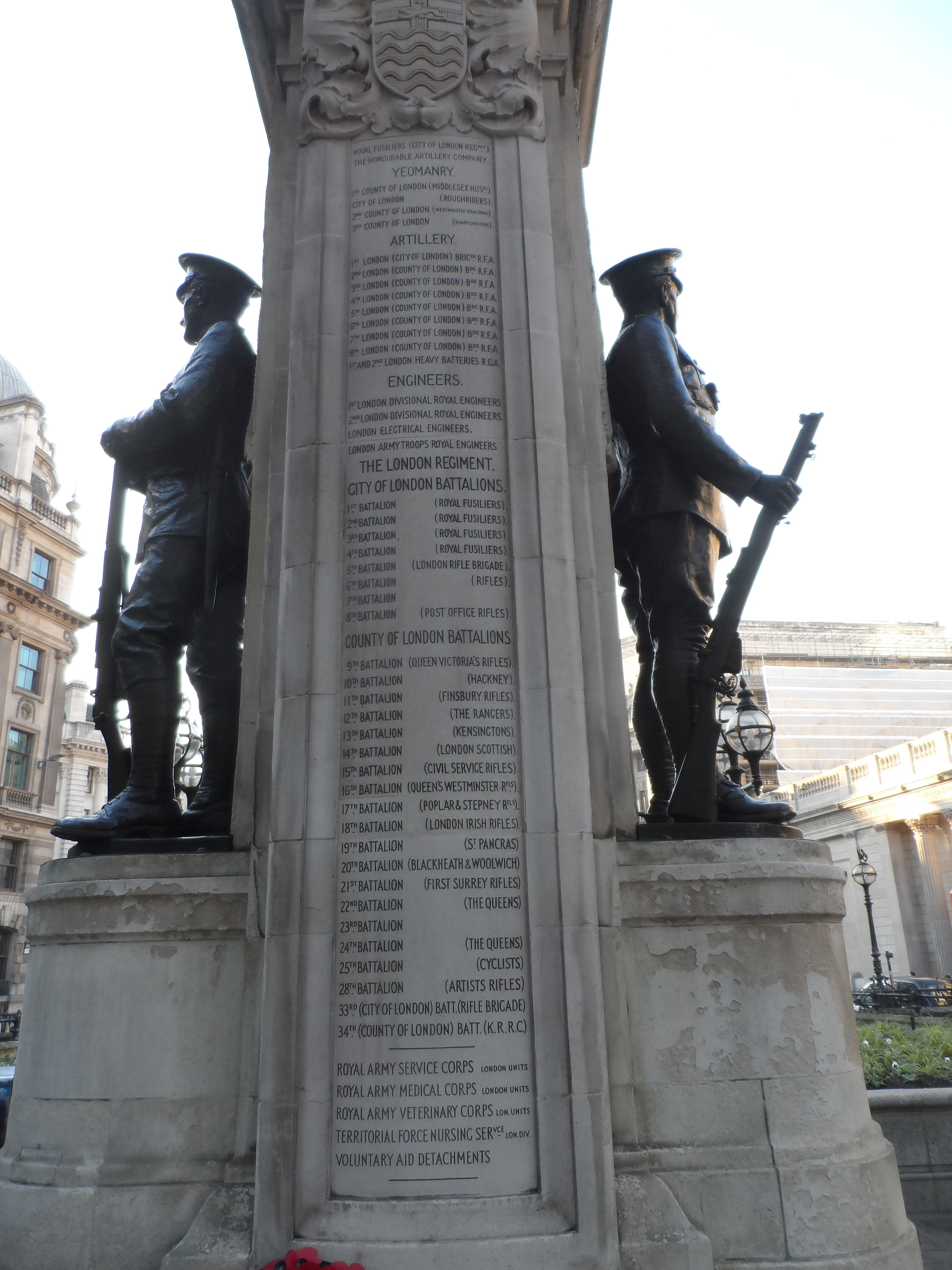
List of regiments on the eastern side of the memorial

== See also ==
- 1920 in art
- List of public art in the City of London
- Grade II* listed war memorials in England
