= Coat of arms of London =

Coat of arms of London may refer to

- Coat of arms of the City of London
- Coat of arms of the County of London
- Coat of arms of Greater London
