= Flag of London =

Flag of London may refer to:

- the flag of the City of London in the United Kingdom
- the Flag of Greater London in the United Kingdom
- the Flag of London, Ontario in Canada
