= Russell baronets of Littleworth Corner (1916) =

Cunynghame Baronetcy, Littleworth Corner
- Arms of the Russell baronets of Littleworth Corner.
- Creation date: 18 January 1916
- Baronetage: Baronetage of the United Kingdom
- First holder: Sir Charles Russell, 1st Baronet
- Present holder: Sir Charles Dominic Russell, 4th Baronet
- Status: Extant
- Motto: Che sera sera (What will be, will be)
- Arms: Argent a Lion rampant Gules on a chief Sable three Escallops of the field the whole within a Bordure engrailed Vert
- Crest: A Goat passant Argent armed Or charged on the body with three Trefoils slipped fesswise Vert

The Russell baronetcy, of Littleworth Corner, Burnham in the County of Buckingham, was created in the Baronetage of the United Kingdom on 18 January 1916 for Charles Russell, a senior partner in the firm of Charles Russell & Co., solicitors. The baronetcy was created with remainder, failing heirs male of the grantee, to the heirs male of his father.

== Russell baronets, of Littleworth Corner (1916) ==
- Sir Charles Russell, 1st Baronet (1863–1928)
- Sir Alec Charles Russell, 2nd Baronet, MC (1894–1938)
- Sir Charles Ian Russell, 3rd Baronet (1918–1997)
- Sir Charles Dominic Russell, 4th Baronet (born 1956)

The heir apparent is the present holder's only son Charles William Russell (born 1988).

== Extended family ==
Among the heirs under the special remainder is William Russell, a former Lord Mayor of London: his grandfather Denis Russell was a grandson of Charles Russell, Baron Russell of Killowen.
