= Vincent Keaveny =

Lawyer and Lord Mayor of London

Alderman Vincent Keaveny CBE KStJ
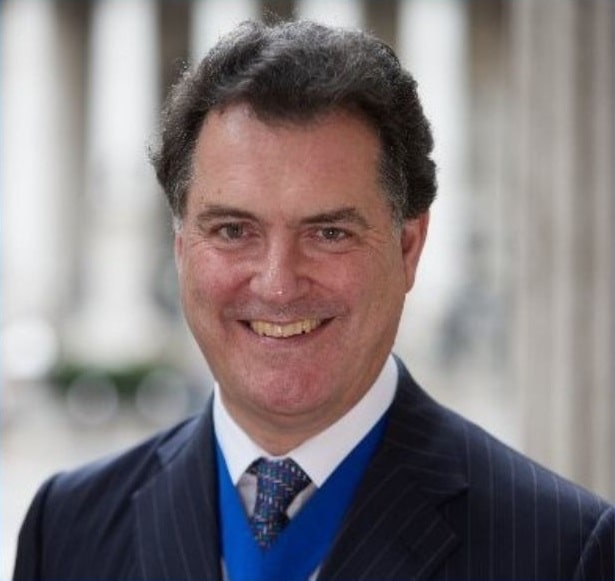
- Keaveny in 2022

693rd Lord Mayor of London
- In office 13 November 2021 – 11 November 2022
- Preceded by: Sir William Russell
- Succeeded by: Nicholas Lyons

Personal details
- Born: Vincent Thomas Keaveny; 1 July 1965 (age 60) Dublin, Leinster, Ireland
- Education: St Michael's College, Dublin
- Alma mater: University College, Dublin; Trinity College, Dublin
- Occupation: Lawyer
- Awards: Knight of St John

Vincent Thomas Keaveny CBE KStJ (born 1 July 1965) is an Irish commercial lawyer who served as the 693rd Lord Mayor of London for 2021–22.

== Biography ==
Educated at St Michael's College, University College Dublin, and Trinity College Dublin, since 1989 Keaveny has lived and worked in England, qualifying as a solicitor in 1992. He took the degree of Bachelor of Civil Law from University College Dublin in 1986, and has been a partner in DLA Piper since 2015.

Keaveny serves as Alderman for the Ward of Farringdon Within since 2013, and served as a Sheriff of the City of London for 2018–19. He is a liveryman of the City of London Solicitors' Company, the Worshipful Company of Woolmen, the Distillers, the Spectacle Makers, the Stationers and Newspaper Makers, the Framework Knitters, the Upholders, and the Security Professionals. He is also the Governor of the Court of The Honourable The Irish Society, a role generally given to a former Lord Mayor.

In 2018, Keaveny was awarded the UCD Alumni Award in Law.

Elected Lord Mayor of London, Keaveny took office on 13 November 2021, being appointed KStJ.

Alderman Nicholas Lyons succeeded him as Lord Mayor on 11 November 2022.

Vincent Keaveny is a Member of the Order of the Holy Sepulchre.

Keaveny was appointed Commander of the Order of the British Empire (CBE) in the 2023 Birthday Honours for services to socio-economic advancement, British–Irish relations and the City of London.

Civic offices
Preceded by Sir William Russell	Lord Mayor of London; 2021 – 2022	Succeeded by Sir Nicholas Lyons
