= William Russell (lord mayor) =

British financier and politician (born 1965)

Sir William Russell
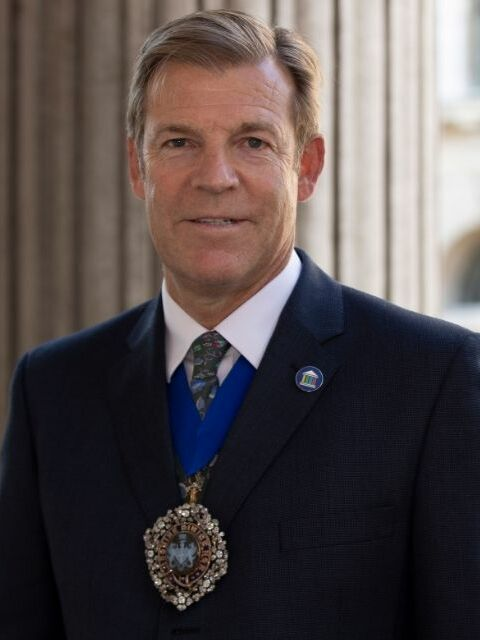
- Lord Mayor Russell in 2021

692nd Lord Mayor of London
- In office 9 November 2019 – 13 November 2021
- Preceded by: Sir Peter Estlin
- Succeeded by: Vincent Keaveny

Personal details
- Born: William Anthony Bowater Russell; 15 April 1965 (age 61) London, United Kingdom
- Spouse: Hilary Chaplin (m. 1989)
- Children: 4
- Education: Durham University
- Occupation: Investment banker

Sir William Anthony Bowater Russell (born 15 April 1965) is a British financier who served as the 692nd Lord Mayor of the City of London from 2019 to 2021.

== Biography ==
Educated at Eton and Durham University, graduating B.A., Russell started his career in financial services at First Boston in 1987, and joined Merrill Lynch in 1992, working in Hong Kong, New York and London, before leaving in 2006 for public service.

Sheriff of the City of London for 2016/17, Russell was then elected Lord Mayor on 1 October 2019, taking office on 9 November 2019. In view of the global disruption to public life brought about by the COVID-19 pandemic, Russell was re-elected, on 29 September 2020, as Lord Mayor of London to serve a second term for 2021, the first Lord Mayor to serve more than one term since William Cubitt MP, who was re-elected in 1861. He is the fifth member of his family to have held this position.

Russell represents Bread Street Ward as Alderman on the City of London Corporation since 2013.
He served as Master of the Haberdashers' Company for 2024/25, and is a Liveryman of the Feltmakers' as well as an Honorary Liveryman of the Paviors' Companies.

Russell was knighted in the 2022 New Year Honours for services to "financial innovation, culture and wellbeing in the City of London, particularly during COVID-19".

A keen cricketer, he is also a member of MCC, and remains an Advisory Board member of Innovate Finance, an independent not-for-profit membership organisation serving the global FinTech community.

Sir William serves as Chairman of the Barbican Centre Board since 2024 (Deputy Chairman, 2022–24).

== Family ==
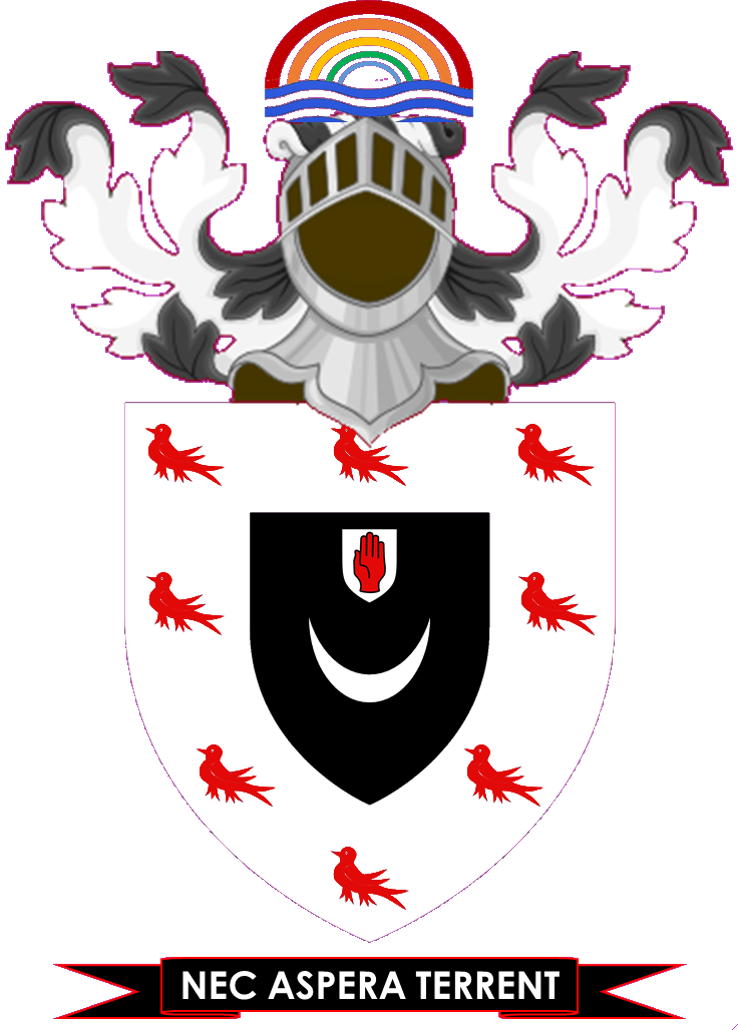
Bowater arms

The only son of Anthony Russell (1934–1966), a stockbroker, he is in remainder to the family baronetcy, created for his great-great-uncle, Charles Russell, founder of the eponymous law firm.

His mother, Charlotte née Bowater (1937–2001), was from a Kentish family of paper packagers; she was the younger daughter and heiress in her issue of Sir Ian Bowater GBE, who served as Lord Mayor of London for 1969/70, and a granddaughter of Sir Frank Bowater, Lord Mayor for 1938/39. Russell is the fifth member of his family elected as Lord Mayor of London.

British actor Damian Lewis CBE is his maternal half-brother.

Married in 1989 to Hilary Chaplin, Sir William and Lady Russell have four children.

== Honours ==
- 2022: Knight Bachelor
- 2019: Knight of the Most Venerable Order of St John

=== Arms ===
Coat of arms of William Russell
Crest A Goat passant Argent armed Or charged on the body with three Trefoils slipped fesswise Vert Helm That of a Knight Escutcheon Argent a Lion rampant Gules on a chief Sable three Escallops of the Field the whole within a Bordure engrailed Vert Motto Che sera sera (Eng: What will be, will be) Orders Behind the Shield, the Badge of St John and suspended below, by its ribbon, the insignia of a Knight Bachelor:; Other elements As Lord Mayor, Russell could impale the City of London arms (dexter) with his family arms (sinister), and likewise as Master Haberdasher can impale the Haberdashers' arms (dexter):

== See also ==
- Lord Russell of Killowen
- Russell baronets

== Additional reading ==
- Burke's Peerage & Baronetage
- Lord Mayor Russell's biography

Civic offices
Preceded by Sir Peter Estlin	Lord Mayor of London; 2019–2021	Succeeded by Vincent Keaveny
