= Coat of arms of Greater London =

Coat of arms in England

Versions
- Badge

- Banner
- Armiger: Greater London Authority
- Adopted: 13 November 2025
- Shield: Barry wavy argent and azure, on a chief gules a Saxon crown Or.
- Badge: On a roundel argent fimbriated gules charged with three bars wavy azure, a torteau thereon a Saxon crown Or.
- Predecessor(s): Greater London Council, granted 1 September 1965

The coat of arms of Greater London is that belonging to the Greater London Authority, the strategic authority for Greater London. The upper third of the coat of arms contains a gold Saxon crown on a red field, and the lower two-thirds contain alternating blue and white wavy lines. These elements refer respectively to the Saxon origins of London and to its position on the River Thames. The arms were originally created in 1965, when they were granted by the College of Arms to the Greater London Council, the top-tier local authority for Greater London. When the council was abolished in 1986 the arms became defunct. In 2025 they were transferred to the Greater London Authority, which had been established in 2000.

== History ==
The Greater London Council was established on 1 April 1965, under the London Government Act 1963, as the top-tier local authority for Greater London. Coats of arms for the new Greater London local authorities were being considered as early as 1963, and following the first elections to the Greater London Council in 1964, the authority made an application to the College of Arms for a grant of arms. The resulting design was approved at a meeting of the council on 6 July 1965, and the arms were granted on 1 September 1965.

As the coat of arms could not legally be used by other organisations in Greater London that wanted to identify their locality, the council was awarded a heraldic badge by the College of Arms on 5 October 1966. Three ceremonial badges were created, fashioned from existing London County Council badges, and were first worn by the chairman, vice-chairman and deputy chairman of the council at a meeting on 25 January 1966.

When the council was abolished in 1986 its coat of arms ceased to be used. The London Fire and Civil Defence Authority applied to the College of Arms in the same year for the transfer of the arms, as the London Fire Brigade had previously used them, but was refused. Instead, a new grant of arms of a similar but distinct design was made on 7 December 1991.

The Greater London Authority was created in 2000 as a new local government body for Greater London, but did not apply for the coat of arms to be transferred to it. In February 2020 the London Assembly, part of the authority, unanimously supported a motion by Tom Copley "to have the Greater London Council's coat of arms transferred to the Greater London Authority". In November 2024 the assembly confirmed its support for the transfer of the arms, and in January 2025 Sadiq Khan, the mayor of London, approved the submission of a petition to King Charles III via the College of Arms. The petition was granted in November 2025, and both the arms and badge of the Greater London Council were transferred to the Greater London Authority.

== Design ==
The arms were designed by Anthony Wagner, the Garter Principal King of Arms of the College of Arms. William Fiske, leader of the Greater London Council, and Percy Rugg, leader of the opposition, were consulted on the design. The lower part of the shield has six waved horizontal bars, coloured blue and white. This represents water and the position of London on the River Thames. This device was also seen on the predecessor coat of arms of the London County Council. The upper square part is red with a gold Saxon crown, representing London's Saxon origins. This device also appeared on the coat of arms of Middlesex County Council. The coat of arms does not include supporters or a motto.

== Blazon ==
The blazon of the coat of arms is Barry wavy argent and azure, on a chief gules a Saxon crown Or. The blazon of the badge is On a roundel argent fimbriated gules charged with three bars wavy azure, a torteau thereon a Saxon crown Or.

== Usage ==
The Chair of the London Assembly wears the ceremonial badge of office, bearing the coat of arms, that was previously used by the Chairman of the Greater London Council.

== See also ==
- Symbols of Greater London
- Armorial of London
