= Peter Estlin =

691st Lord Mayor of London

Sir Peter Estlin KStJ
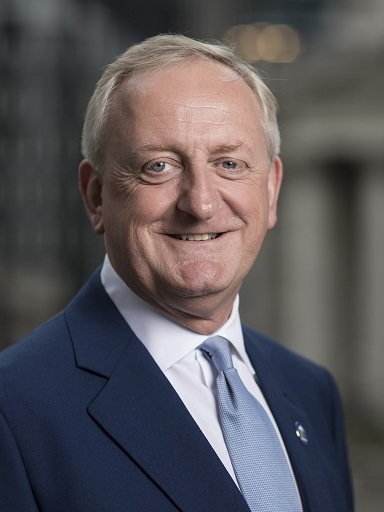
- Estlin in 2018

691st Lord Mayor of London
- In office 9 November 2018 – 8 November 2019
- Preceded by: Charles Bowman
- Succeeded by: William Russell

Personal details
- Born: Peter Kenneth Estlin; 1961 (age 64–65)
- Spouse(s): Linda, Lady Estlin (née Waters)
- Education: University of Bristol
- Occupation: Chartered accountant

Sir Peter Kenneth Estlin KStJ (born July 1961) was the 691st Lord Mayor of the City of London and is a British businessman.

== Biography ==
Born in 1961 in Portsmouth, he attended Sarisbury Green Primary School and later King Edward's School, Witley, a foundation school set up by the City of London in 1553. He read Economics and Accounting at the University of Bristol and joined Deloitte Haskins & Sells to train as a Chartered Accountant, becoming a partner with Coopers & Lybrand in 1993. He was chief financial officer for Salomon Brothers Asia, and then for Citi's Investment and Corporate Banking divisions in New York and London. He joined Barclays bank in 2008 and was appointed Acting Group Chief financial officer in August 2013. Estlin has publicly advocated for the Belt and Road Initiative.

He is an alderman of the City of London Corporation where he represents the ward of Coleman Street. Having served as a Sheriff of the City of London for 2016–17, he was elected as the Lord Mayor of London on 1 October 2018 and took office at the Silent Ceremony on 9 November 2018. His mayoral theme was Shaping Tomorrow's City Today, promoting the sheer scale of innovation taking place in the UK, alongside championing digital skills, particularly to create a more inclusive society.

Sir Peter is currently Chairman of Vanquis Banking Group as well as an independent non-executive director of Rothschild & Co. He is also involved with several not-for-profit organisations associated with skills and apprentices.

Sir Peter was appointed Knight of the Order of Saint John and an honorary bencher of Middle Temple in 2018. As Chancellor of City University of London, he was awarded and honorary doctorate of science in 2019. In 2020, he was knighted in the 2020 New Year Honours for services to international business, inclusion and skills. and later that year awarded an honorary doctorate of laws by his alma mater, the University of Bristol.

== Honours ==
- 2020: Knight Bachelor
- 2018: Knight of the Most Venerable Order of St John

== Arms ==
- Crest: An oak tree in base and a sword between two roses in chief
- Helm: That of a Knight
- Motto: Mentes inflamma
  (Eng: To set minds alight)
- Orders: Behind the Shield, the badge of St John and suspended below, by a ribbon, the insignia of a Knight Bachelor:
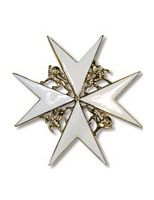
  ;

Civic offices
| Preceded by Sir Charles Bowman | Lord Mayor of London; 2018–2019 | Succeeded by Sir William Russell |
