= Coat of arms of the City of London =

Coat of arms of city in Greater London

Versions
- Stylised version, used as a logo by the City of London Corporation
- Armiger: City of London Corporation
- Adopted: 1381
- Crest: On a wreath argent and gules a dragon's sinister wing argent charged on the underside with a cross throughout gules
- Shield: Argent a cross gules, in the first quarter a sword in pale point upwards of the last
- Supporters: On either side a dragon argent charged on the undersides of the wings with a cross throughout gules
- Motto: Domine dirige nos (Lord guide us)

The coat of arms of the City of London is that belonging to the Corporation of the City of London, the local authority of the City of London, Greater London, England. The blazon of the arms is Argent a cross Gules, in the first quarter a sword in pale point upwards of the last.

The earliest record of the current coat of arms dates to 1381, when it is recorded as part of a new seal for the lord mayor; an earlier coat of arms depicting Saint Paul holding a sword was in use in 1319. The first record of a crest and helm being used is a redesign of the city's common seal from 1539, and the first record of the current dragon supporters and motto is a manuscript of 1609. Only the shield was registered with the College of Arms until 1957, when a grant of the full achievement was made.

== Description and blazon ==
The Corporation of the City of London has a full achievement of armorial bearings consisting of a shield on which the arms are displayed, a crest displayed on a helmet above the shield, supporters on either side and a motto displayed on a scroll beneath the arms.

The blazon of the arms is as follows:

- Arms: Argent a cross gules, in the first quarter a sword in pale point upwards of the last.
- Crest: On a wreath argent and gules a dragon's sinister wing argent charged on the underside with a cross throughout gules.
- Supporters: On either side a dragon argent charged on the undersides of the wings with a cross throughout gules.

The Latin motto of the City is Domine dirige nos, which translates as "Lord, direct [guide] us". It appears to have been adopted in the 17th century, as the earliest record of it is in a manuscript of 1609.

A banner of the arms (the design on the shield) is flown as a flag of the City.

== Historical development ==
The coat of arms is "anciently recorded" at the College of Arms. It was in use in 1381, forming part of the design of a new mayoral seal brought into use on 17 April of that year. The arms consist of a silver shield bearing a red cross with a red upright sword in the first quarter. They combine the emblems of the patron saints of England and London: the Cross of St George with the symbol of the martyrdom of Saint Paul. The 1381 arms replaced an earlier shield, found on an early 13th-century seal and on two embroidered seal-bags of 1319, that depicted St Paul holding a sword. It is sometimes said that the sword in the 1381 arms represents the dagger used by Lord Mayor of London William Walworth to kill Wat Tyler, leader of the Peasants' Revolt, on 15 June 1381. This tradition dates at least as far back as the first edition of Holinshed's Chronicles, published in 1577, but cannot be correct, as the arms were in use some months before Tyler's death.

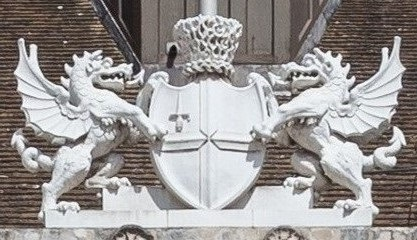
Arms above the southern entrance to Guildhall, by George Dance (1788), surmounted by a "Muscovy hat" rather than a helm and crest

The crest is a dragon's wing bearing the cross of St George, borne upon a peer's helmet. A primitive form of the crest first appeared in 1539 on the reverse of a new common seal. This showed a fan-like object bearing a cross. Over time this evolved into a dragon's wing, and was shown as such in 1633 when it appeared above the city's coat of arms in the frontispiece to the fourth edition of John Stow's Survey of London. The wing is specified as a dragon's "sinister" wing, i.e. its proper left wing. It has been speculated that the use of a peer's helmet (rather than that of a gentleman, as appears in other civic arms) relates to the use of the honorific prefix "The Right Honourable" by the Lord Mayor. The helm was confirmed in 1957. Earlier representations sometimes show the arms surmounted by a "Muscovy hat", as worn by the City Swordbearer during the Stuart and Georgian periods: a notable example is seen carved above the main southern entrance to Guildhall.

On the seal of 1381 two lions were shown supporting the arms. However, by 1609 the present supporters, two silver dragons bearing red crosses upon their wings, had been adopted. The dragons were probably suggested by the legend of Saint George and the Dragon.

The crest, supporters, and motto were used without authority until 30 April 1957, when they were confirmed and granted by letters patent from the College of Arms.

== Gallery ==
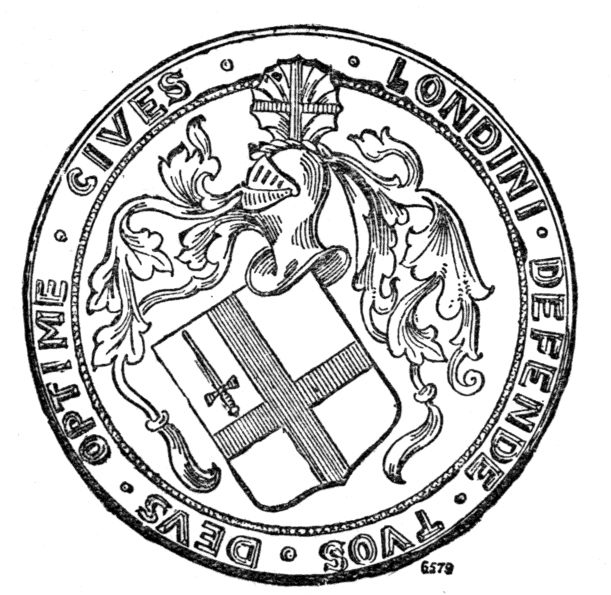
Arms on seal of 1539

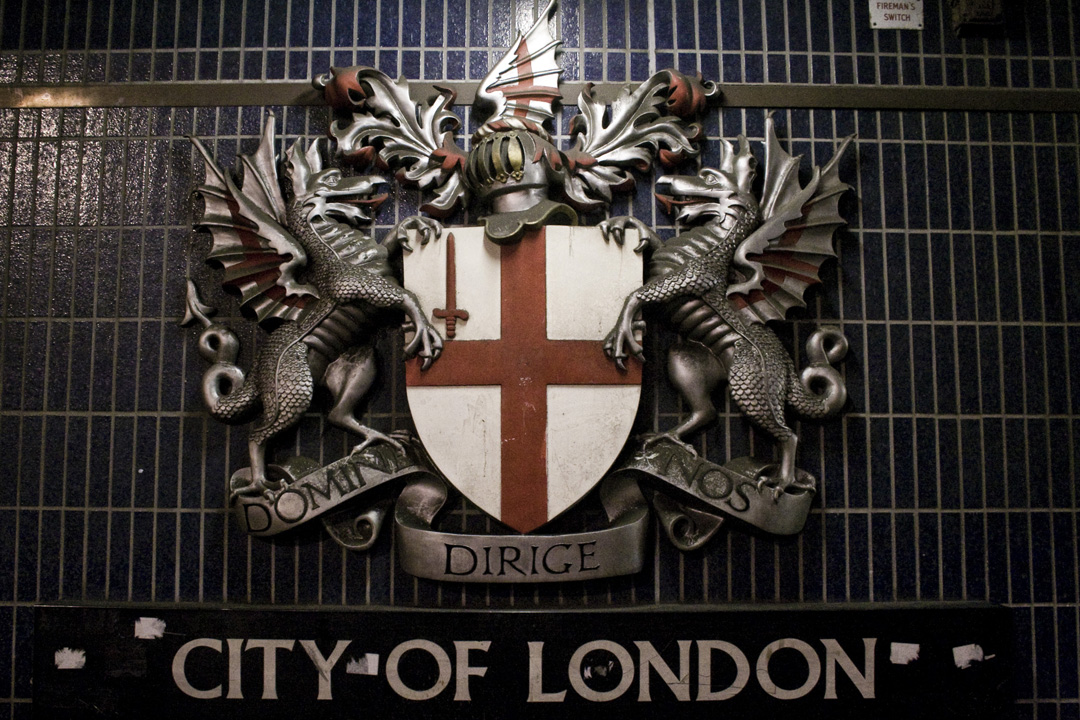
At Blackfriars railway station

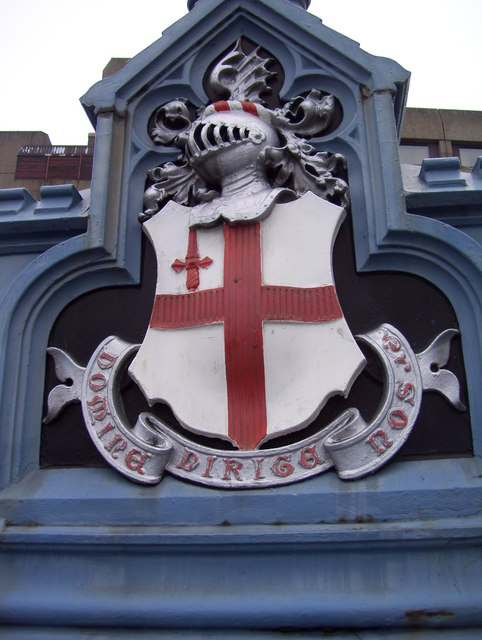
On Tower Bridge

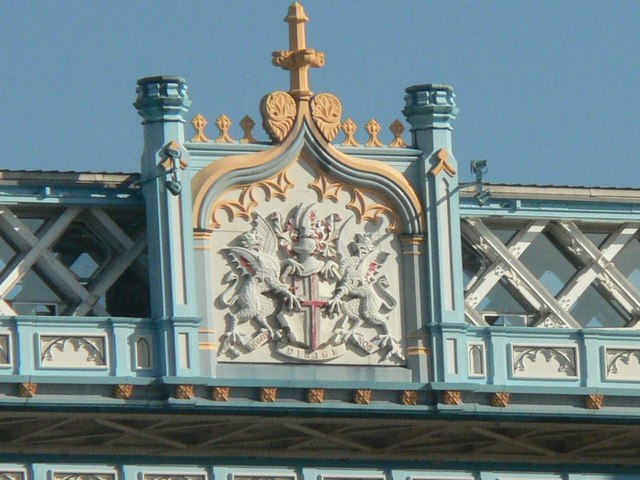
On the walkway of Tower Bridge

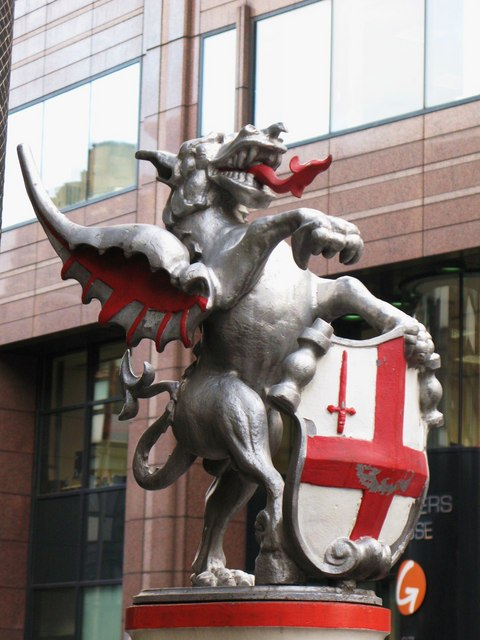
City boundary marker: a single dragon supporter holds the shield of arms

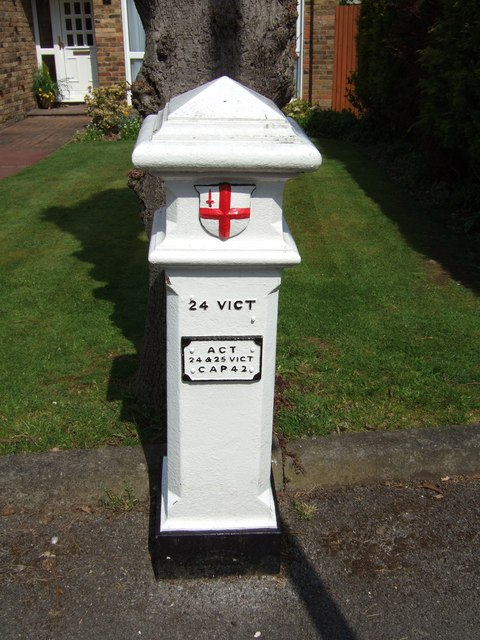
Plain shield on a coal-tax post

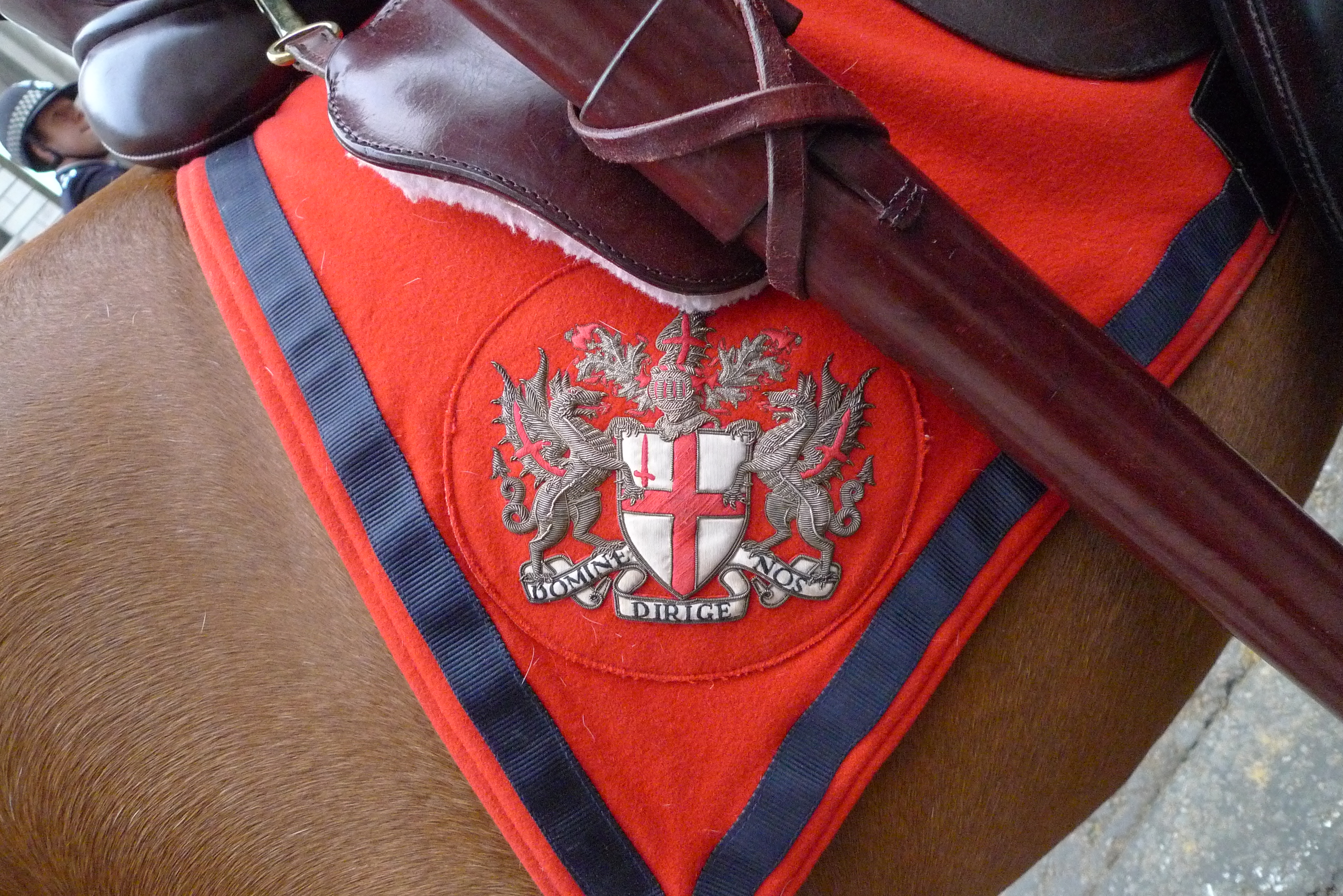
On a shabraque, photographed at the Lord Mayor's Show, 2011

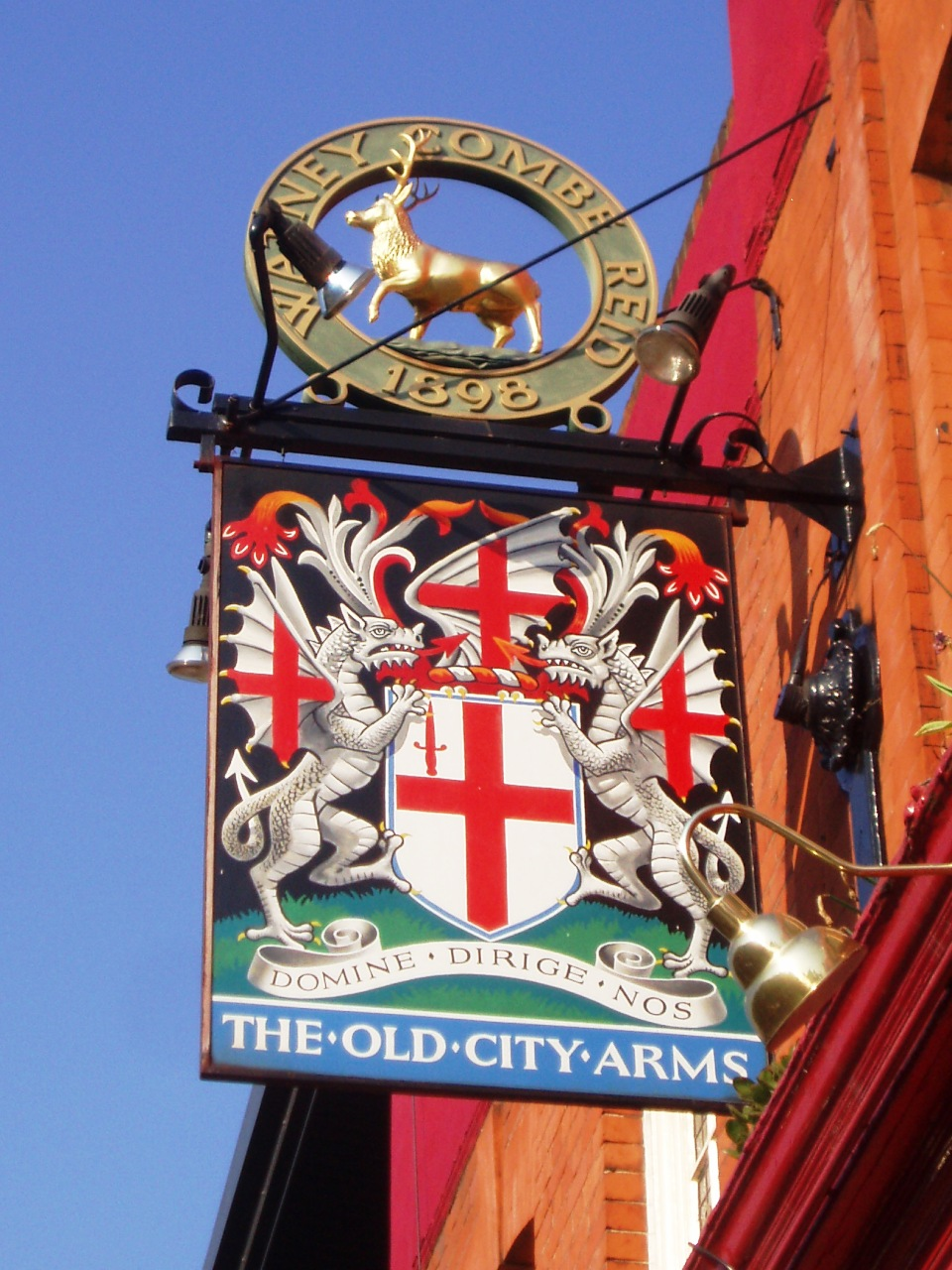
On a pub sign near Hammersmith Bridge

Lord Mayor Russell's personal arms during office (2019–2021)

Arms of the Port of London Authority

Lord Mayor Mainelli's personal arms during office (2023-2024)

== See also ==
- Flag of the City of London
- Coat of arms of London County Council
- Armorial of London
- Symbols of Greater London
