= Nicholas Lyons =

694th Lord Mayor of London

Sir Nicholas Lyons KStJ
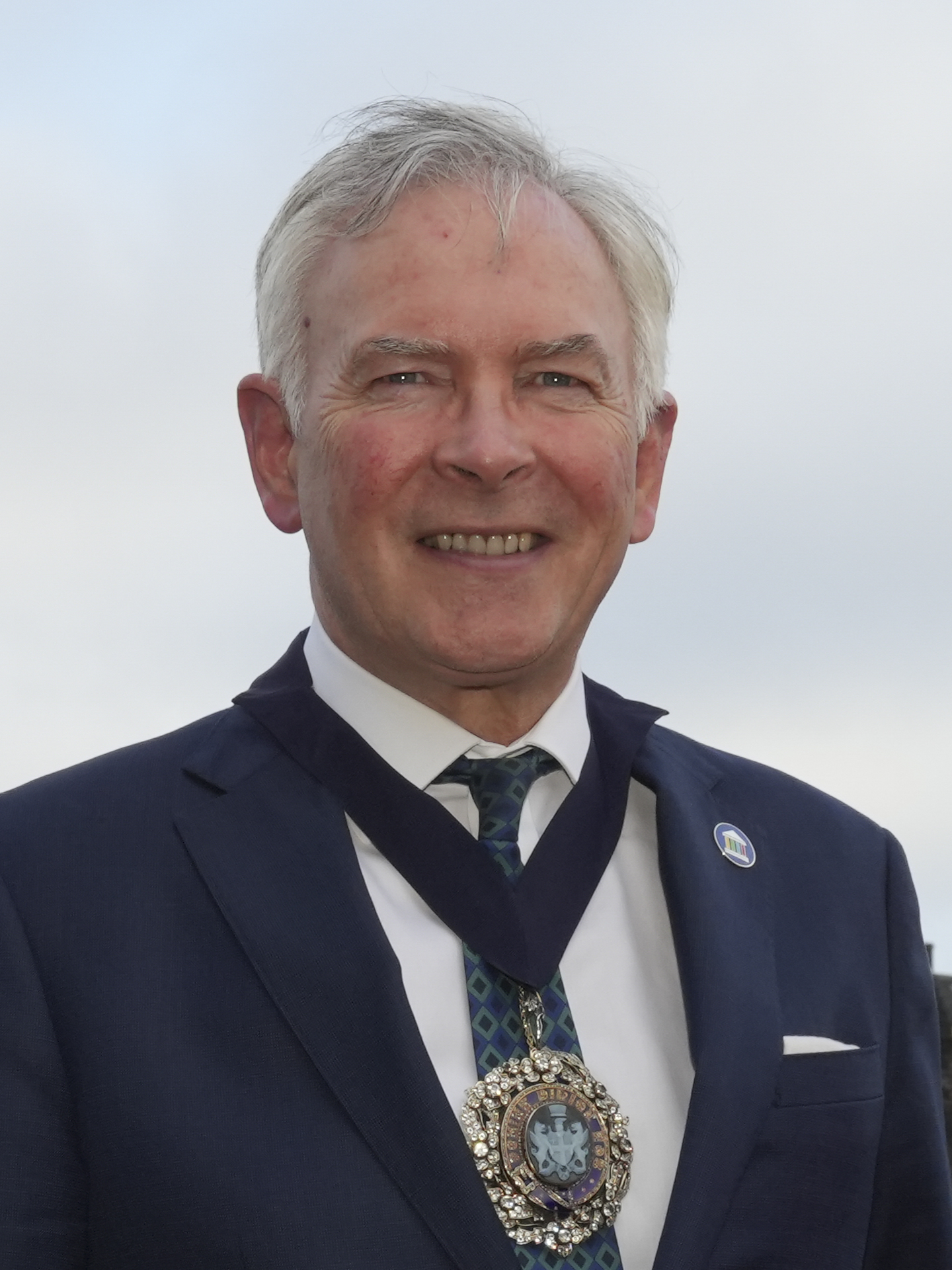
- Lord Mayor Lyons in 2023

694th Lord Mayor of London
- In office 11 November 2022 – 10 November 2023
- Preceded by: Vincent Keaveny
- Succeeded by: Michael Mainelli

Personal details
- Born: Nicholas Stephen Leland Lyons; 20 December 1958 (age 67) Dublin, Leinster, Ireland
- Spouse: Felicity Parker (m. 1986)
- Children: 4
- Education: King's School, Canterbury
- Alma mater: Gonville and Caius College, Cambridge
- Occupation: Financier
- Awards: Knight Bachelor Knight of St John Coronation Medal

Sir Nicholas Stephen Leland Lyons KStJ (born 20 December 1958), is an Anglo-Irish financier who served as the 694th Lord Mayor of London for the 2022–23 term.

== Biography ==
The younger son of Dr Leland Lyons, FBA, FRSL, Provost of Trinity College, Dublin, formerly of Old Park, Belfast, he was educated at King's School, Canterbury, and Gonville and Caius College, Cambridge, graduating as BA (proceeding MA).

Lyons first worked as a political research assistant in London and then for the EEC Directorate-General for External Relations in Brussels, before joining Morgan Guaranty Trust Company of New York in London in 1982 where he worked for 12 years, then at Salomon Brothers from 1994 to 1995 and then moved with a team to Lehman Brothers where he worked from 1995 until 2003.

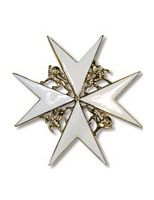
KStJ insignia

A Court Assistant of the Merchant Taylors' and Bakers' companies, Lyons was elected Lord Mayor of London, taking office on 11 November 2022. He was appointed Knight of the Order of Saint John (KStJ) in 2022 and awarded an Hon DLitt by City University in 2023. He is Chairman of Standard Life PLC, the largest player in the UK retirement and long-term savings industry and a FTSE 100 company.

As Lord Mayor, Lyons seeks to build upon Charles Booth's pensions work by championing ‘Financing our Future’. Lyons represented the City of London in the Royal Procession at the Coronation of Charles III, attired in the Lord Mayor's Coronation robes.

In 1986 Lyons married Felicity née Parker, with whom he has 4 children. In the run-up to the Coronation, as Lady Mayoress she deputised at various civic events, such as presenting the Curriers' Company London History Essay Prize at the Guildhall.

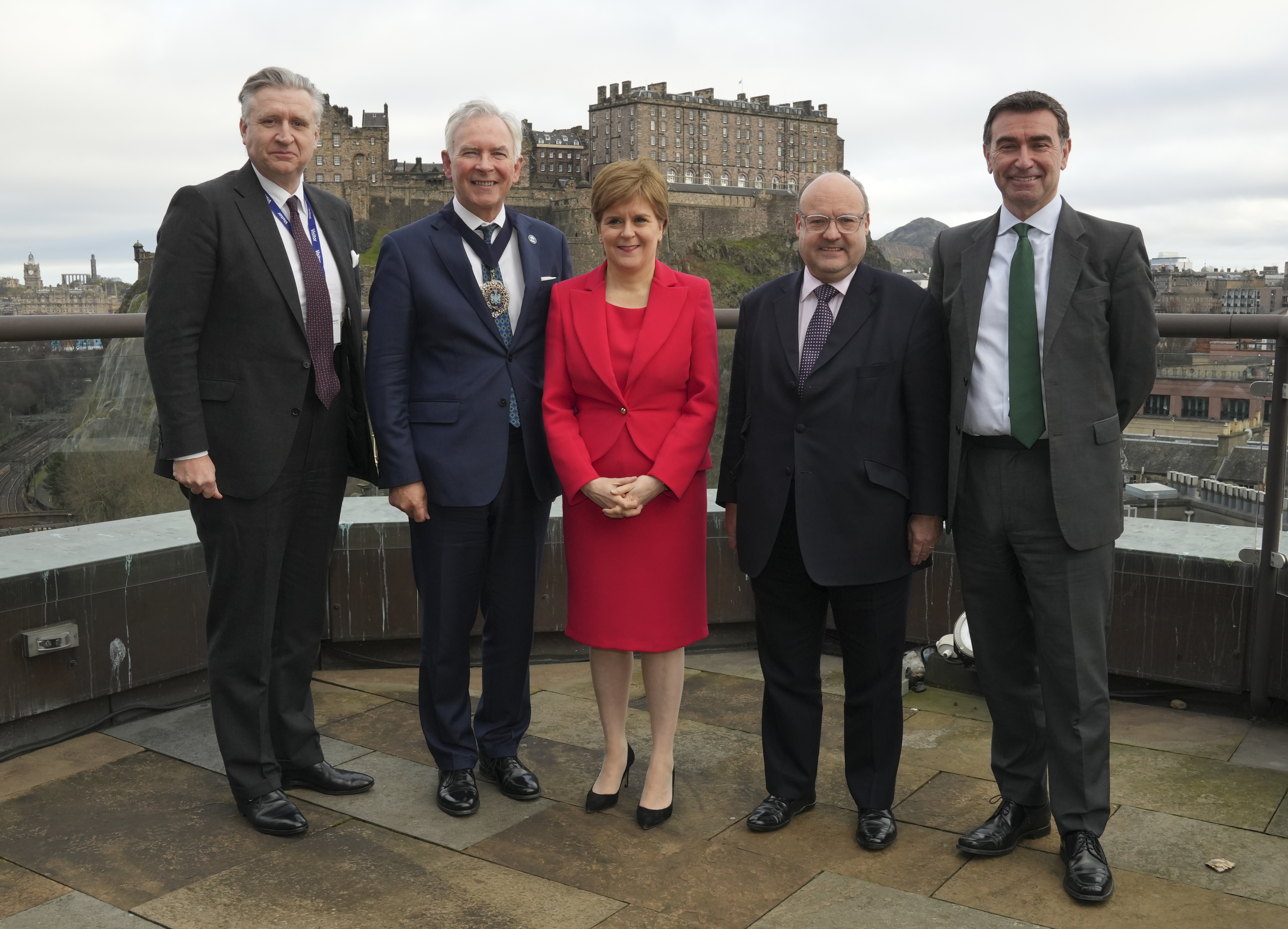
Lord Mayor Lyons beside First Minister Nicola Sturgeon in Edinburgh (2023)

He was knighted in the 2024 King's Birthday Honours "for services to the financial sector, to the growth economy and to financial literacy".

== See also ==
- City of London
- Dr Leland Lyons

Civic offices
Preceded by Vincent Keaveny	Lord Mayor of London; 2022–2023	Succeeded by Michael Mainelli
