= Charles Bowman (accountant) =

British accountant (born 1961)

Sir Charles Bowman JP FCA
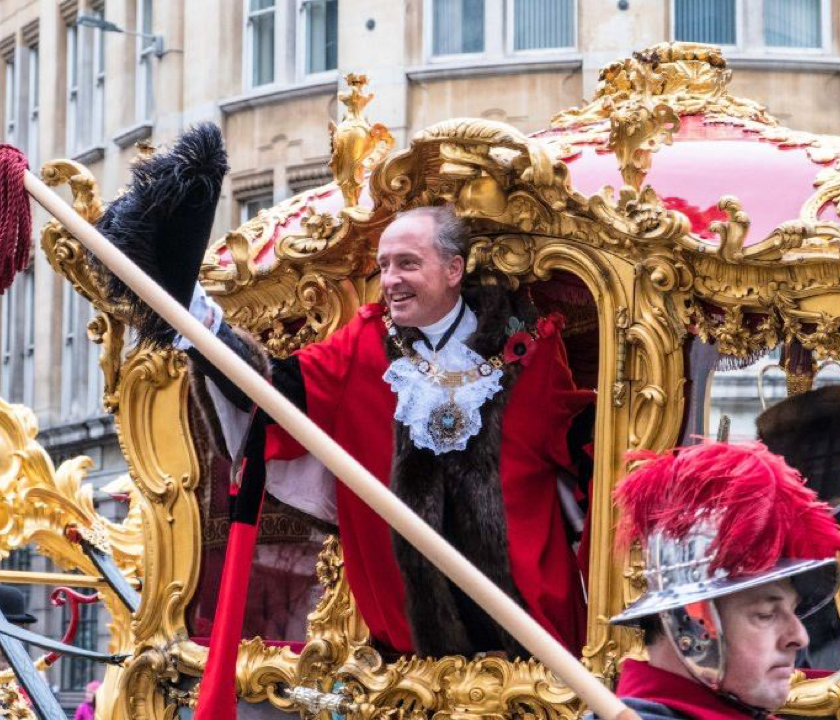

690th Lord Mayor of London
- In office 10 November 2017 – 9 November 2018
- Preceded by: Sir Andrew Parmley
- Succeeded by: Sir Peter Estlin

Personal details
- Born: Charles Edward Beck Bowman; 8 December 1961 (age 64) Essex
- Spouse(s): Samantha, Lady Bowman (née Kemball)
- Education: University of Bristol
- Occupation: Chartered accountant

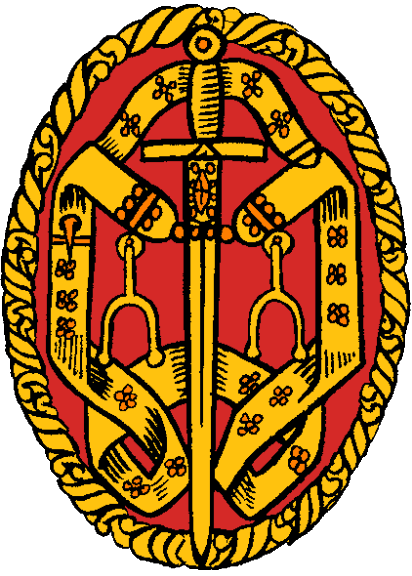
Insignia of a Knight Bachelor

Sir Charles Edward Beck Bowman JP FCA (born 8 December 1961), is a British accountant who served as the 690th Lord Mayor of London.

== Career ==
Bowman was born in Essex and educated at Old Buckenham Hall School from 1970 to 1975 before attending Uppingham School from 1975 to 1979. He then read architecture at the University of Bristol, graduating as a BA.

Bowman joined Price Waterhouse in 1983 and qualified as a chartered accountant (FCA) in 1986. He was a partner in Price Waterhouse and PwC from 1995 to 2020 and has been an adviser to the firm since then.

He specialised in delivering audit, assurance and capital market transaction services to larger listed and multi-national companies. Amongst many leadership roles in PwC, Sir Charles led the firm's Building Public Trust programme.

Outside of PwC, Bowman has chaired the Assurance Panel and the Audit and Assurance Faculty of the Institute of Chartered Accountants in England & Wales (ICAEW) and was a member of its governing body. He chaired the Audit Quality Forum. Sir Charles has also served as a member of the Advisory Council of the Prince of Wales's Accounting for Sustainability Project, a member of the Board of Trade, a JP, governor of a primary school academy in Hackney, board member of a School Foundation, Ambassador of the Samaritans, Trustee and Chairman of the Lord Mayor's Appeal and an Adviser to The Mansion House Scholarship Scheme. He is a member of the Trade Advisory Group for Professional Advisory Services a board member of the China-Britain Business Council, RedCat Pub Company and The Nurture Landscapes Group, and an Honorary Air Commodore of No. 2623 Squadron RAuxAF Regiment.

Bowman is Master of the Worshipful Company of Grocers (for 2023/24) and a liveryman of the Worshipful Company of Chartered Accountants in England and Wales.

Knighted in the 2019 Birthday Honours for services to trust in business, international trade and the City of London, Sir Charles is also a Knight of Justice of the Order of St John.

== City of London ==
Elected an Alderman of the City of London Corporation, representing Lime Street Ward since May 2013, Bowman served as one of the two Sheriffs of London for 2015/16 and as Lord Mayor of London for 2017/18. As Lord Mayor, Sir Charles launched the City of London Corporation's Business of Trust programme with its aims of helping to create "a lasting legacy of better business, trusted by society".

== Personal life ==
In 1996, Bowman married Samantha Kemball, a veterinary surgeon: they have two daughters, Grace and Charlotte and live in Suffolk, although he has spent the working week in London. Other interests include cricket, golf, tennis, art and architecture and country matters – including helping, when allowed, to co-shepherd a small flock of sheep.

Civic offices
| Preceded by Sir Andrew Parmley | Lord Mayor of London; 2017–2018 | Succeeded by Sir Peter Estlin |
