= Andrew Parmley =

British politician (born 1956)

Sir Andrew Parmley KStJ
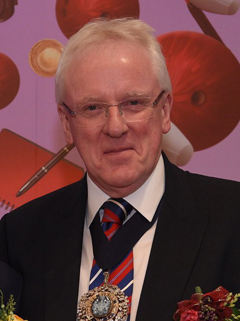

689th Lord Mayor of London
- In office 11 November 2016 – 10 November 2017
- Preceded by: The Lord Mountevans
- Succeeded by: Sir Charles Bowman

Alderman of the City of London Corporation
- Incumbent
- Assumed office 2001
- Ward: Vintry
- Preceded by: John Chalstrey

Personal details
- Born: Andrew Charles Parmley; 17 October 1956 (age 69) Blackpool, Lancashire
- Spouse: Lady Wendy Parmley
- Education: Royal Academy of Music
- Occupation: Educator

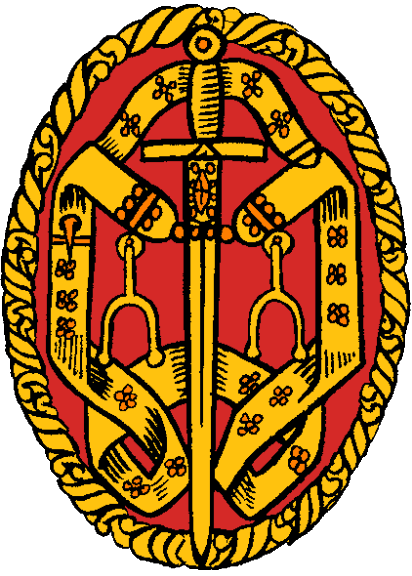
Insignia of a Knight Bachelor

Sir Andrew Charles Parmley, KStJ (born 17 October 1956) is Principal of the Harrodian School in Barnes, London, and served as Lord Mayor of London for 2016–17.

== Early life ==
Born in Lancashire, the third of three sons, Parmley was educated at Blackpool Grammar School. He displayed an early interest in music and started playing the organ, passing the ARCO at 16 and the FRCO aged 18, before winning a scholarship to the Royal Academy of Music. He then studied for a Master's at Manchester University, before pursuing further studies at Royal Holloway College, London, and Jesus College, Cambridge.

== Career ==
Parmley has been Director of Music at Forest School near Snaresbrook, and South Hampstead High School, and then at the Grey Coat Hospital in Westminster.

Sir Andrew is now Principal of the Harrodian School.

He has also been Director of the Royal College of Organists since 2018.

== Personal life ==
Parmley married, in 1980, Lady Wendy Parmley, a Past Master Information Technologist.

== Honours ==
- 2018: Knight Bachelor "for services to Music, Education and Civic Engagement";
- 2016: Knight of the Most Venerable Order of St John.

=== Livery companies and the City ===
First elected as Common Councilman for the Ward of Vintry in 1992, Parmley was returned as Alderman of the City of London in 2001.

His "mother company" is the Musicians, of which he is a Past Master. Sir Andrew is also a Past Master of both Parish Clerks and Glass-Sellers. He was the Honorary President of the Guild of Young Freemen from 2013 until 2019.

Civic offices
Preceded by The Lord Mountevans	Lord Mayor of London; 2016–2017	Succeeded by Sir Charles Bowman
