= Coat of arms of the County of London =

Versions
- Stylised version

- Heraldic badge

- Heraldic banner
- Armiger: London County Council
- Adopted: 1914
- Crest: Mural Crown
- Shield: Barry wavy of six azure and argent, on a Chief of the last the cross of St George charged with a lion of England

The coat of arms of the County of London were those granted to the London County Council in 1914. The coat of arms can still be seen on buildings constructed by the council before its abolition in 1965.

== Background and initial designs ==
By 1894 the LCC had adopted a device consisting of "an armed female figure between the armorial bearings of the Cities of London and Westminster". The question of an official coat of arms for the county council was first raised at a meeting of the council in 1897. Despite the opposition of two members on the grounds that it was "an insidious attempt to undermine the democratic character of the Council" and, jokingly, that they should not "degenerate to the level of the City Corporation", the General Purposes Committee were instructed to take steps to obtain a coat of arms. Nothing seems to have come of this, and the unofficial device continued in use. In May 1906 the general purposes committee was asked to consider and report on whether the council should make an "application to the College of Arms or otherwise take steps to obtain a coat of arms, with a view to commemorating worthily its work in connection with public improvements, such as the construction of new streets and bridges, the restoration of ancient buildings and the like." No further action appears to have been taken until February 1911, when the committee recommended that a coat of arms be obtained at a cost not exceeding £100. The recommendation was rejected by the council, with one member stating that the letters "L.C.C." would be good enough for the council. Another councillor sarcastically suggested the arms of the council should include, among other things, a wrecked ship, the shut gates of the work department and a tombstone to the memory of municipal enterprise with the motto "ad quod damnum".

In 1914 the council chairman, Cyril Cobb offered to defray the cost of obtaining a grant of arms. Following discussions with the College of Arms, a design was submitted by the general purposes committee to the council on 24 February. The blazon of the proposed shield for the coat of arms was stated as: "On a cross the Imperial Crown between, in the first and fourth quarters a representation of the Tower of London and in the second and third quarters an ancient galley, on a chief a lion of England". The suggested crest was a lion issuing from a mural crown and holding a banner of Saint George. The supporters were to be a Roman officer-of-arms and a Saxon warrior. The Latin motto loci dulcedo nos attinet or the pleasantness of the place holds us was suggested. This was adapted from the Annals of Tacitus, and was stated to be the earliest mention of London in history.

The towers were to represent strength and the galleys the shipping interests of the Metropolis. The cross, imperial crown and the lion in the crest were to show that London was the capital of the British Empire. The mural crown symbolised municipal government. The supporters illustrated the origins and early history of the city.

== Grant of arms ==
The final design for the arms, "simple in character and in every way suggestive of the corporate life of London", was agreed by the council on 26 May 1914. The arms were blazoned as:

Barry wavy of six azure and argent, on a Chief of the last the cross of St George charged with a lion of England, the shield ensigned with a Mural Crown gold

The blue and silver waves represented the River Thames and the Port of London. The English lion on a Saint George's Cross was to show that London was the "Royal centre of England", encompassing the nation's capital city. The gold mural crown indicated that the arms were those of a municipal body.

As the arms included part of the royal arms (the English lion) a royal warrant was issued granting the arms on 29 July 1914. The arms were registered at the College of Arms by letters patent dated 20 October 1914.

In 1953 the county council adopted a new representation of the arms, still conforming to the 1914 blazon.

== Ceremonial badges ==
In 1927 a ceremonial badge was created for the chairman. It was produced by Henry George Murphy of the Central School of Arts and Crafts and was presented to George Hume on 22 February 1927. The costs were met by Harry Lewis-Barned, member for Paddington South. The gold and enamel pointed oval badge featured the coat of arms, including the mural crown, surrounded by a wreath of London pride. At the bottom hung a pear-shaped pearl and at the top the letters "LCC" on a scroll. It was decorated with brilliant cut diamonds. A ribbon, repeating the blue and white wavy lines design of the coat of arms, enabled the badge to be worn. Two similar, smaller badges were created in 1950 for the vice-chairman and deputy chairman. The three badges were adapted in 1966 for use by the officeholders of the successor Greater London Council. The chairman's badge is now worn by the Chair of the London Assembly.

== Heraldic badge ==
The arms granted in 1914 could only be used by the county council itself. The council decided that it required an emblem which it could allow clubs and societies associated with the County of London to use. Accordingly, they applied for the grant of an heraldic badge. The badge was granted by letters patent dated 12 March 1956, and was blazoned:

An oval azure charged with two bars wavy argent, on a chief of the last a cross throughout gules, the whole encompassed by a rope or.

The badge repeated the main motifs from the arms: the blue and silver waves and cross of St George. The badge was encircled by a golden rope for the maritime associations of the county. The council permitted "organisations, societies, clubs and other bodies having a connection or association with the County of London" to display the badge subject to conditions imposed by the council.

== Gallery ==
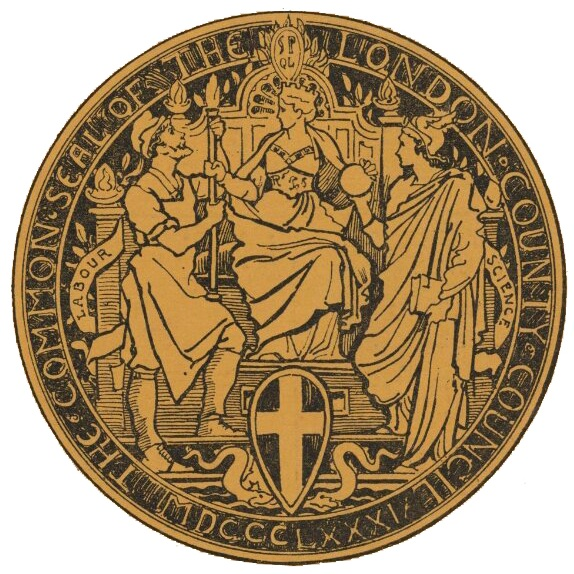
Common Seal of the London County Council (1889-1965)

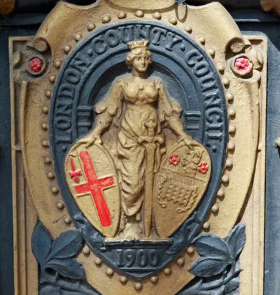
Emblem of London County Council (1894)

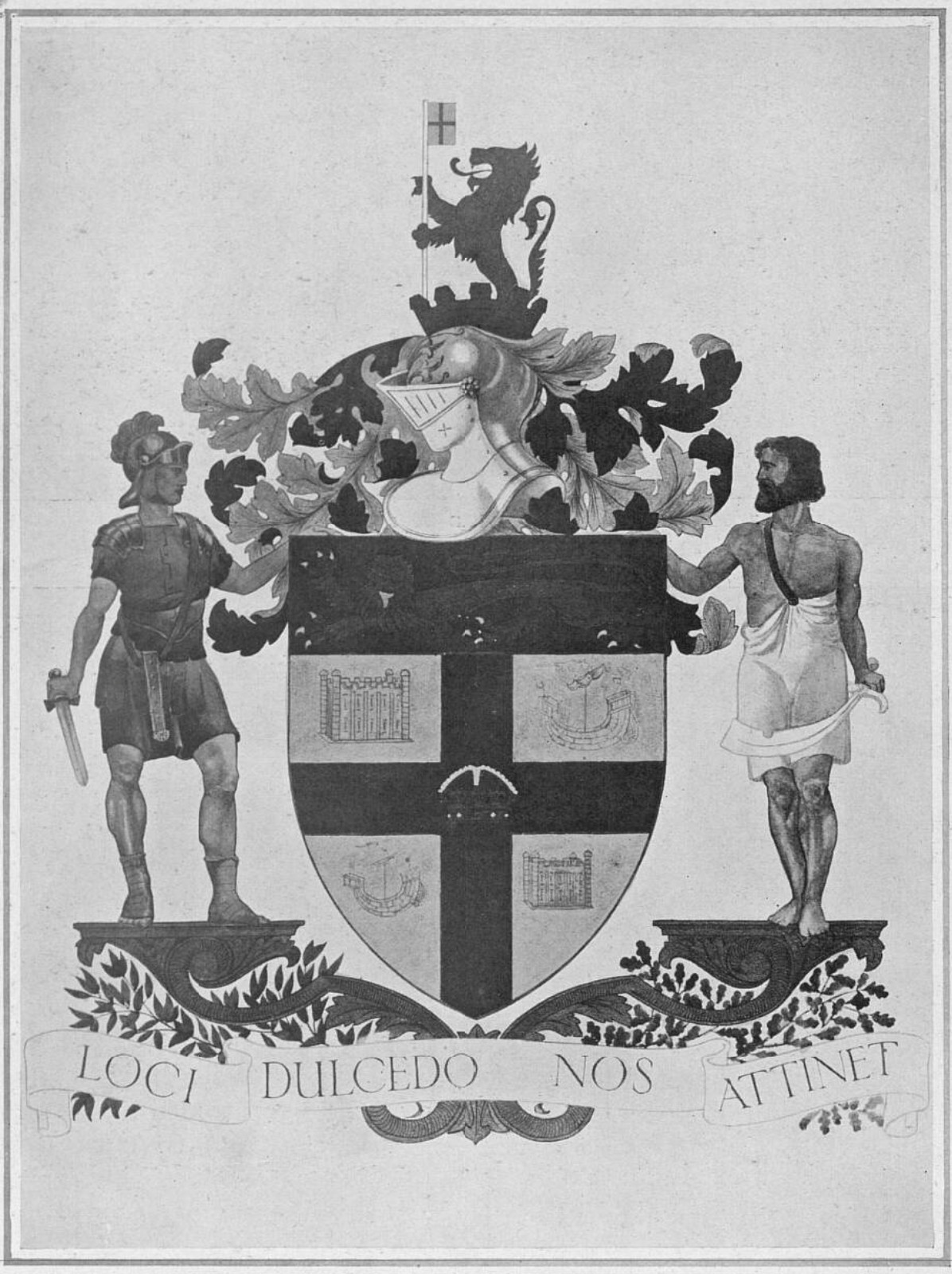
Proposed coat of arms of London County Council (1914)

== See also ==
- Coat of arms of the City of London
- Coat of arms of Greater London
- Armorial of London
- Symbols of Greater London
