= Sir Charles Russell, 1st Baronet =

English solicitor (1863–1928)

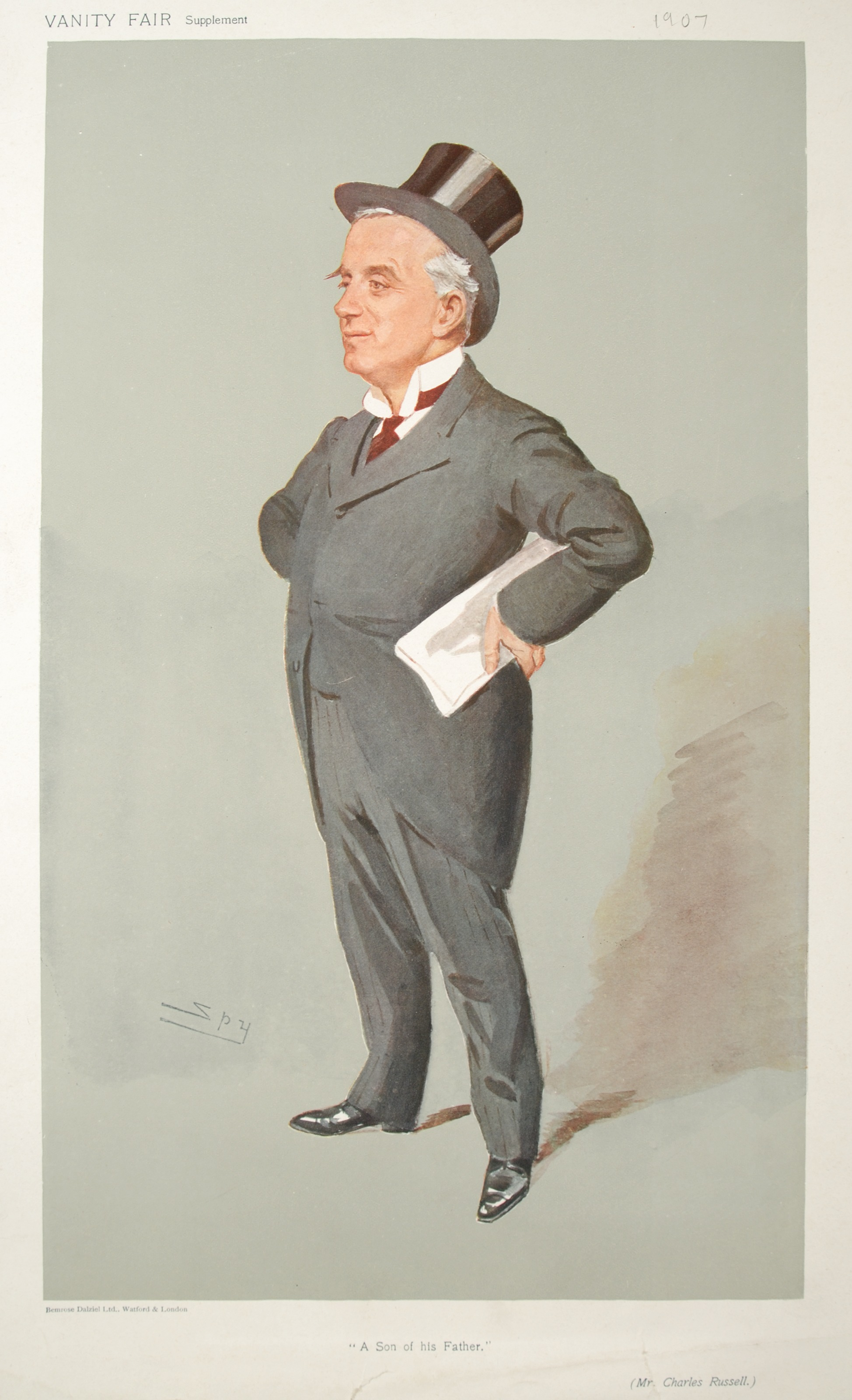
"A Son of his Father" Russell as depicted by "Spy" (Leslie Ward) in Vanity Fair, April 1907

Sir Charles Russell, 1st Baronet, KCVO, KStJ (8 July 1863 – 27 March 1928) was an English solicitor.

== Biography ==
Russell was the son of Charles Russell, Baron Russell of Killowen.

In 1891 he started the firm that became Charles Russell LLP.

Russell was created a Baronet on 18 January 1916, appointed a Knight Commander of the Royal Victorian Order (KCVO) in the 1921 New Year Honours and appointed a Knight of Grace of the Order of St John of Jerusalem (KStJ) in March 1921.

He was succeeded in the baronetcy by his nephew under the terms of the special remainder.

== Notes ==
Baronetage of the United Kingdom
| New creation | Baronet (of Littleworth Corner); 1916–1928 | Succeeded by Alec Russell |
