= Flag of the City of London =

English municipal flag

City of London
- Proportion: 1:2
- Design: A centred red cross on a white background with a red sword in the upper left quarter
- Use: Flag of Lord Mayor of the City of London

The flag of the City of London is based on the flag of England, having a centred red St George's Cross on a white background, with the red sword in the upper hoist canton (the top left quarter). The sword is believed to represent the sword that beheaded Saint Paul, who is the patron saint of the city. The tip of the sword always points upwards; therefore, when the flag is held on its side as a banner, the sword would be printed to face hoist and would be located on the left as it is hanging down (see below).

This flag does not represent Greater London as a whole, only the historical City of London which covers approximately 1 square mile (2.6 km^{2}). All references in this article relate to that city, not Greater London.

== Symbolism and history ==
Arms of the Corporation of the City of London: Argent, a cross gules in the first quarter a sword in pale point upwards of the last; Supporters: Two dragons with wings elevated and addorsed argent on each wing a cross gules; Crest: On a dragon's wing displayed sinister a cross gules

The flag is a banner of arms, derived from the City's coat of arms with the sword symbolising the sword that beheaded St Paul who is the patron saint of the city. St Paul has featured as a symbol of the city since about the 13th century. His full figure representation was rapidly replaced with his symbolic representation of the sword.

Some believe the sword is a dagger that commemorates the dagger of Sir William Walworth, former Lord Mayor of London, which killed Wat Tyler, leader of the Peasants' Revolt, in 1381. A verse at Fishmongers' Hall may explain the relationship:

Brave Walworth, Knight, lord mayor that slew
Rebellious Tyler in his alarmes;
The king therefore did give him in lieu
The dagger to the city armes.

However this is now considered a fable, as the sword on the arms was already in use several months before the killing of Tyler (the arms were introduced in April; and Tyler was stabbed in June).

The earliest mention of the City's coat of arms was on 17 April 1381 when the old seal was deemed "ill-befitting the honour of the City" and a replacement commissioned by Walworth. Both St Paul and St Thomas Becket featured in the previous design and were carried over to the new one similar to the modern design.

== Usage ==
Flag shown when displayed as banner

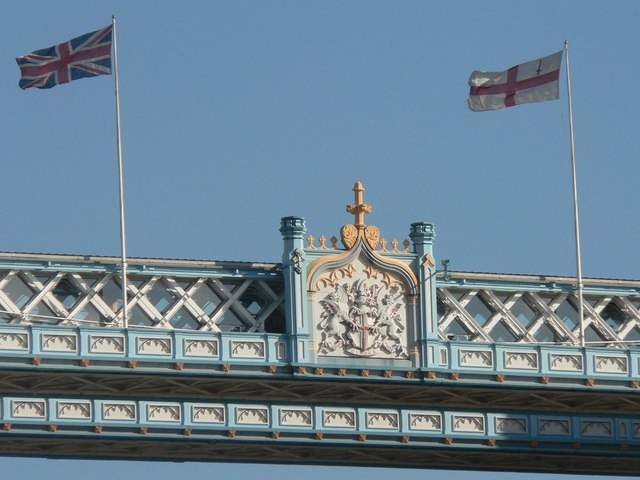
Flag flying on Tower Bridge

The flag flies from various buildings in the city such as the formal buildings of Guildhall (the seat of power in the city) and Mansion House. The official residence of the Lord Mayor of London (the Lord Mayor has a variant of the flag, defaced with his coat of arms).

It can also be seen on sites outside the city that are administered by the City of London Corporation (the governing body) such as on Tower Bridge, the Animal Reception Centre at Heathrow Airport and Hampstead Heath. It can also be seen on certain landmarks, such as the bridges maintained by the Bridge House Estates.

The flag is used on the one pound coin design of 2010.

== See also ==
- Coat of arms of the City of London
- Armorial of London
- Symbols of Greater London
- Flag of the City of Genoa
