= Symbols of Greater London =

Flags used for Greater London, England

The Greater London Authority and predecessor bodies, the Greater London Council and London County Council, have flown and used many flags and symbols.

== London County Council ==
London County Council was created in 1889, replacing the Metropolitan Board of Works. The council was granted a coat of arms in 1914 and flew a banner of these arms over County Hall from 1923 onwards. The arms depicted waves representing the River Thames, the flag of England and a lion to signify London's status as the capital city of England and the United Kingdom and a mural crown.

Coat of arms of London County Council (1914–1965)

Badge of London County Council

Banner of the London County Council (1914–1965)

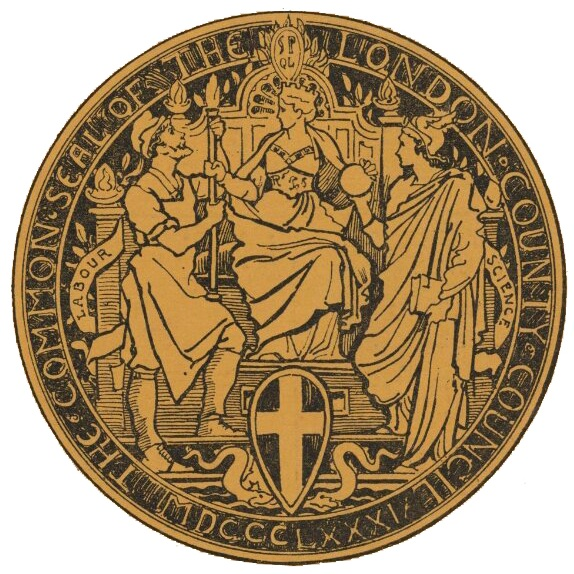
Common Seal of the London County Council (1889-1965)

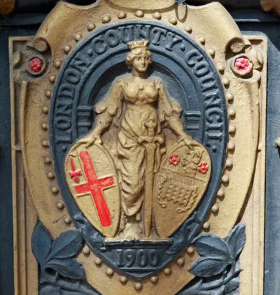
Emblem of London County Council (1894)

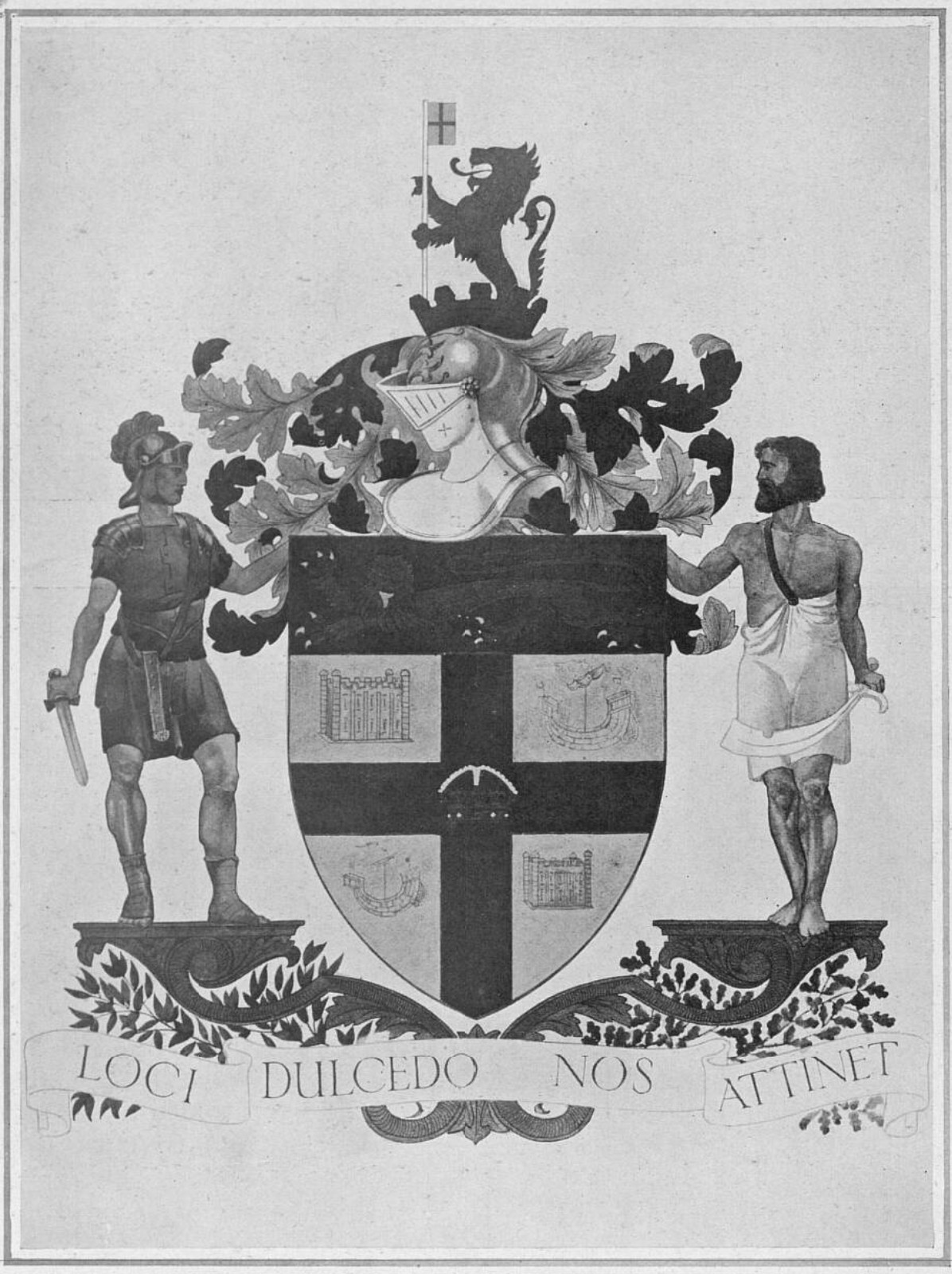
Proposed coat of arms of London County Council (1914)

== Greater London Council ==
London County Council was replaced in 1965 by the Greater London Council (GLC), which covered a larger area. The GLC was subsequently granted a coat of arms which contained elements taken from the arms of its predecessor bodies: waves taken from the arms of London County Council and a Saxon crown taken from the arms of Middlesex County Council. The flag of the GLC consisted of its coat of arms displayed on a white field. The common seal of the GLC depicted the coat of arms of the council surrounded by london landmarks and the words "THE COMMON SEAL OF THE GREATER LONDON COUNCIL: 1964".

Coat of arms of the Greater London Council (1965–86)

Heraldic badge of the Greater London Council (1966–86)

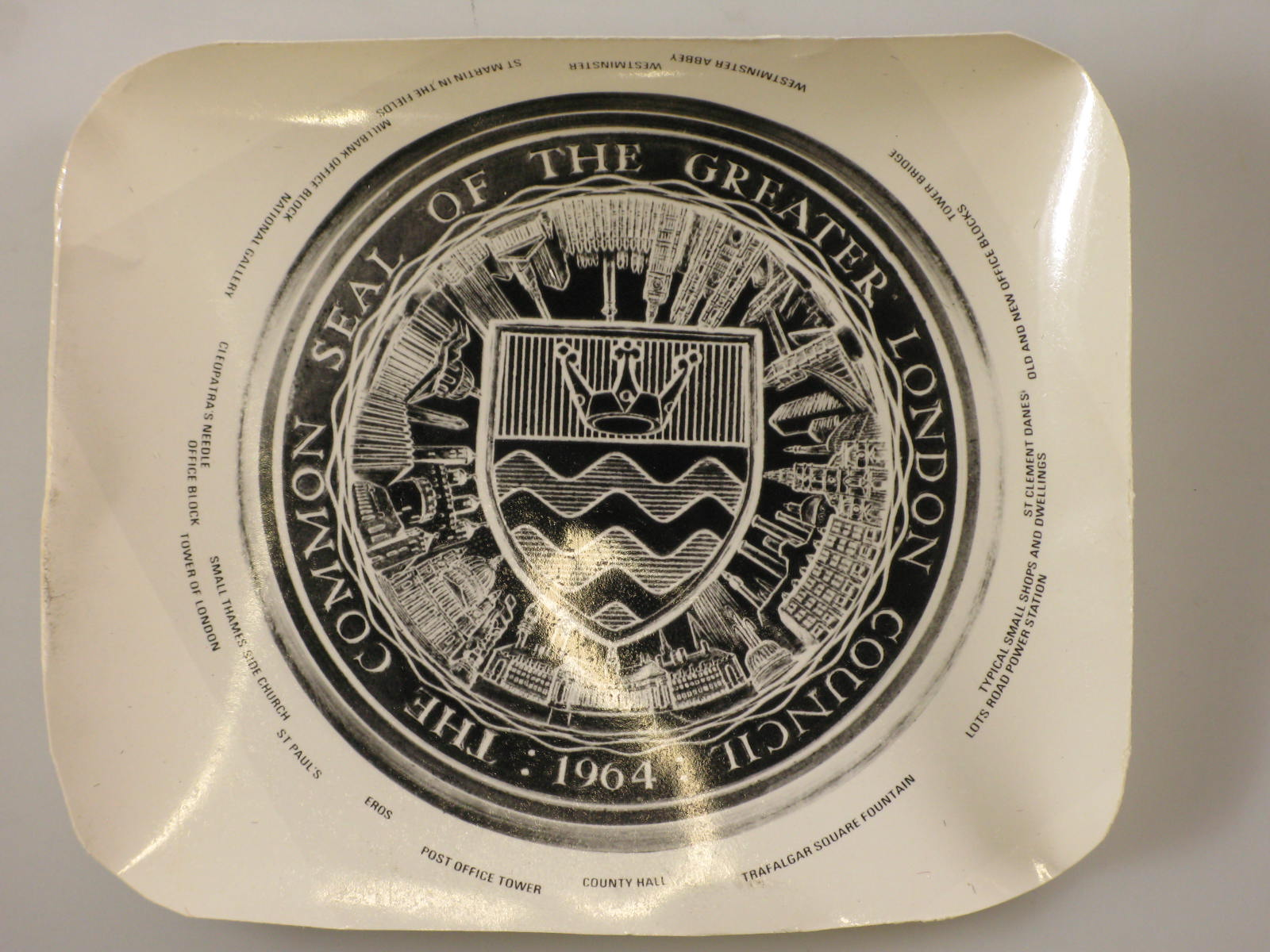
Common seal of the Greater London Council

Banner of arms of the Greater London Council (1965–86)

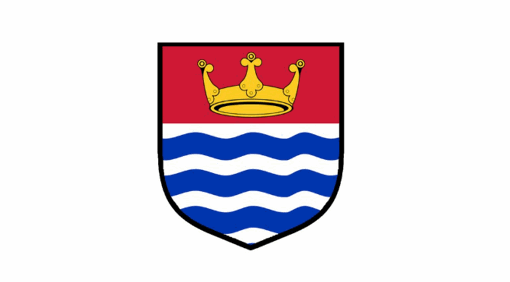
Maritime flag flown on Greater London Council vessels (1965–86)

== Interregnum ==
The Greater London Council was abolished in 1986 leaving London without a strategic local government authority. A number of ad hoc bodies were established including the Inner London Education Authority, London Boroughs Grants Committee, London Fire and Civil Defence Authority, London Planning Advisory Committee, London Regional Transport, the London Research Centre and the London Residuary Body.

Logo of the Inner London Education Authority

Logo of the London Fire and Civil Defence Authority

Logo of the London Planning Advisory Committee

Logo of London Regional Transport from 1984–89, when it was rebranded as London Transport

== Greater London Authority ==
The Greater London Authority was established in 2000 and was granted the right to use the coat of arms of the former Greater London Council in 2025.

For the first few months of its existence, the Greater London Authority used a logo depicting a representation of the course of the River Thames against a green disk also containing the name of the authority.

in 2001, a wordmark was adopted, created by design agency Appetite, consisting of the word LONDON with the letters LOND in blue and ON in red. A flag depicting this logo was flown outside City Hall, the headquarters of the Greater London Authority, between 2001 and 2008. The wordmark was updated to a monochrome colour scheme in 2008 by Boris Johnson, during his tenure as mayor."

In 2016, the Greater London Authority flew a pink flag with the text "#LondonIsOpen" outside City Hall.

From 31 January 2020, after Brexit (which a majority in Greater London voted against), a flag based on a campaign graphic originally launched in 2016 was flown, the design consisting of a white field charged with the word "LONDON" where the letters "O" in the word are representations of the globe showing different hemispheres and with the legend "EVERYONE WELCOME" in smaller letters below.

Placeholder flags, with the words CITY HALL on either a blue or red background have also been flown outside City Hall.

In February 2020, London Assembly member and Deputy Mayor Tom Copley proposed a motion calling on the Mayor of London to ask the College of Arms to transfer the arms of the Greater London Council to the Greater London Authority. The motion received unanimous support from assembly members; however, Mayor Sadiq Khan, while supporting the request in principle, asked the assembly to consider costs involved and to reconfirm the decision the following month. The arms and badge of the former Greater London Council were granted to the Greater London Authority in November 2025.

The Chair of the London Assembly wears the ceremonial badge of office that was previously worn by the Chairman of the Greater London Council. The badge, which depicts the coat of arms of the Greater London Council and the letters GLC, is made of 18 ct gold with 29 diamonds, four clusters of 8 small pearls and a pendant pearl.

The Greater London Authority makes bylaws under its common seal. This is a wafer seal consisting of a disc containing no symbol or insignia surrounded by the words "COMMON SEAL OF THE GREATER LONDON AUTHORITY".

Current

Coat of arms of the Greater London Authority (2025–present)

Badge of the Greater London Authority (2025–present)

Banner of arms of the Greater London Authority (2025–present)

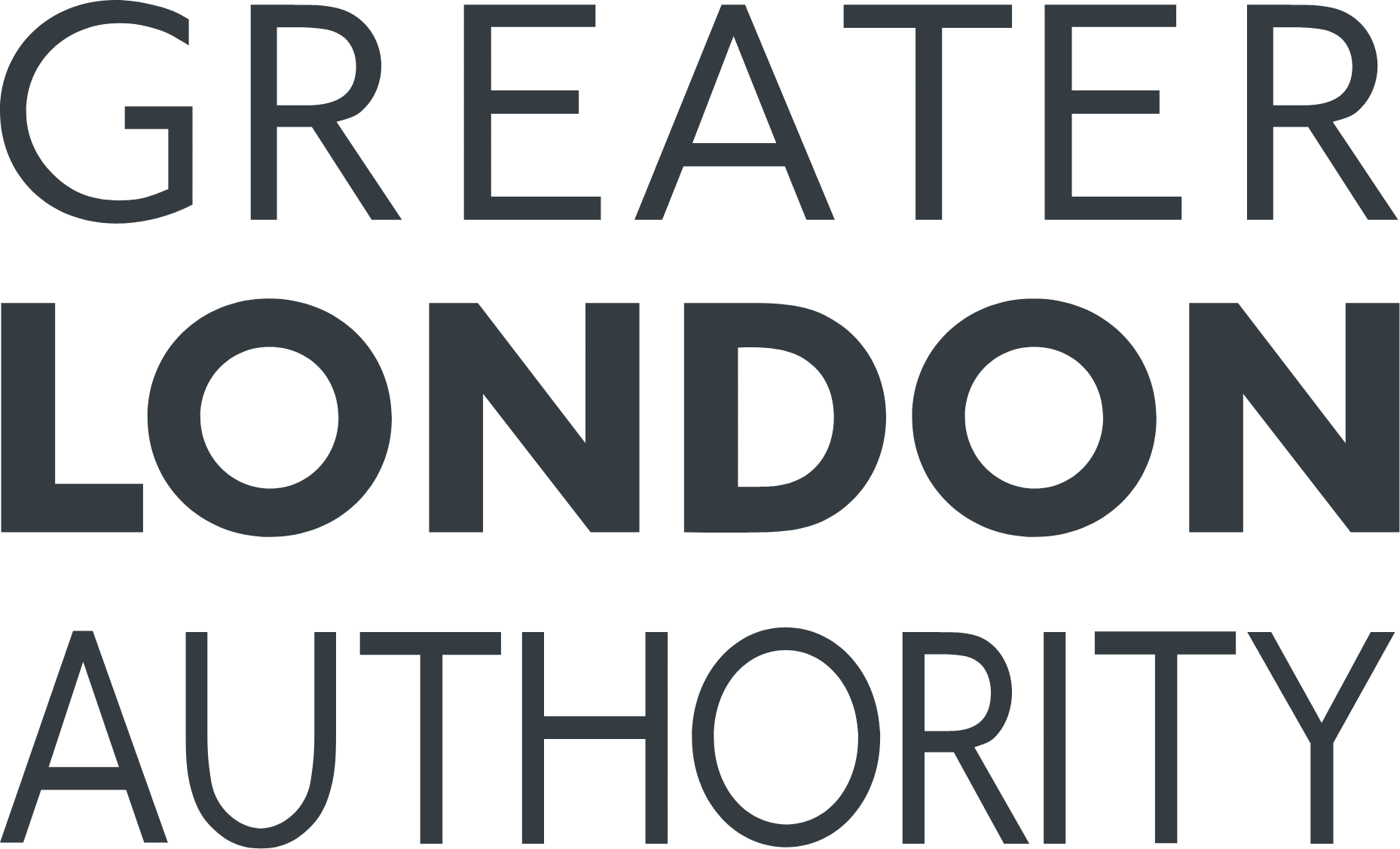
Wordmark used by the Greater London Authority

Wordmark used by the Greater London Authority

Wordmark used by the Mayor of London

Wordmark used by the London Assembly

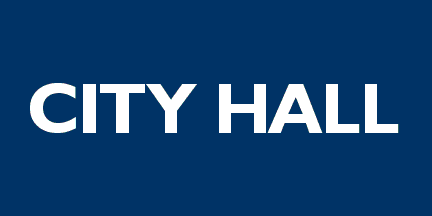
"CITY HALL" flag

Historic

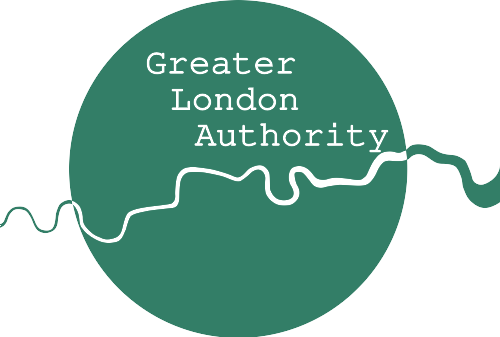
Logo of the Greater London Authority (2000–01)

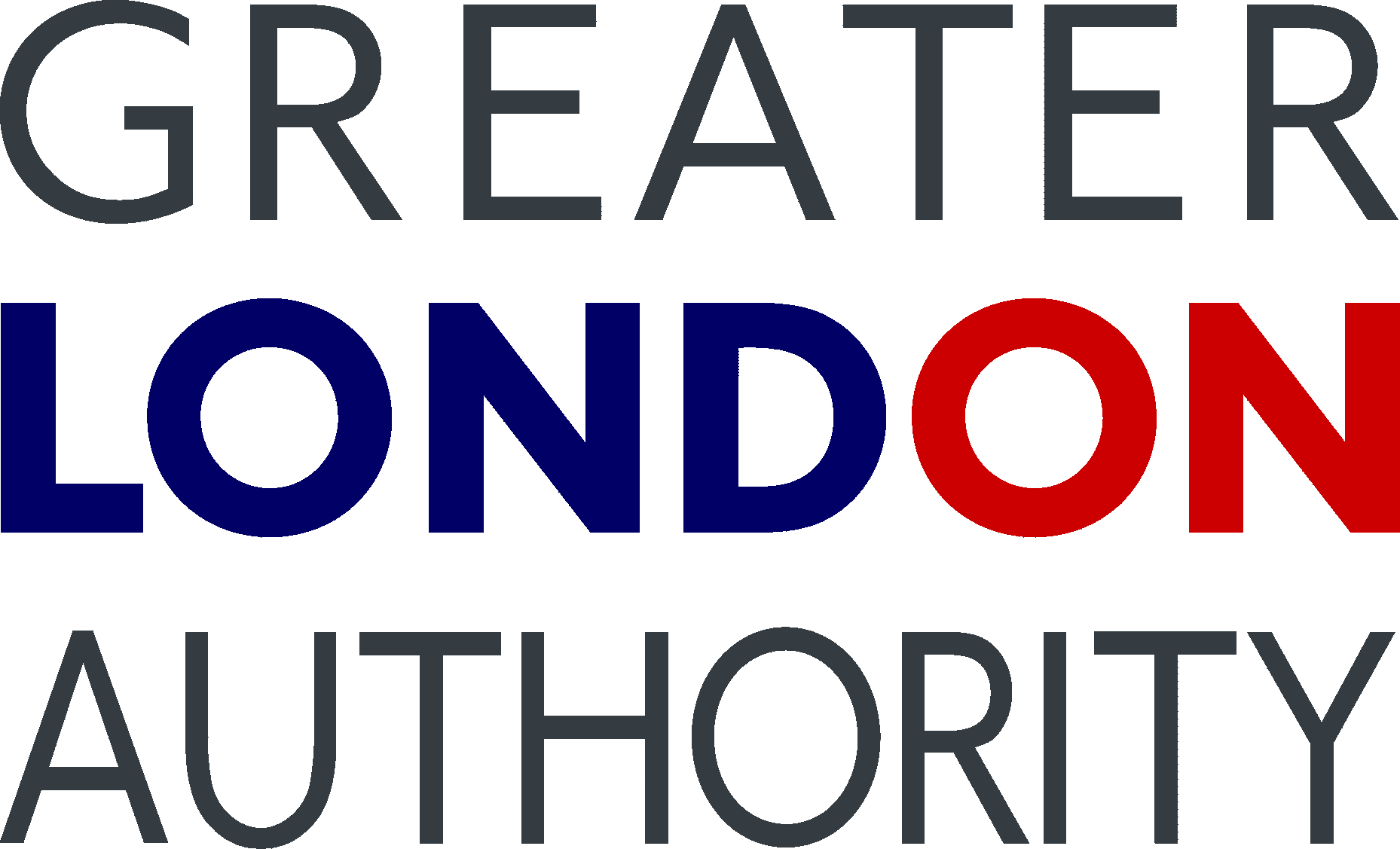
Wordmark of the Greater London Authority (2001–2008)

Flag flown by the Greater London Authority (2001–2008)

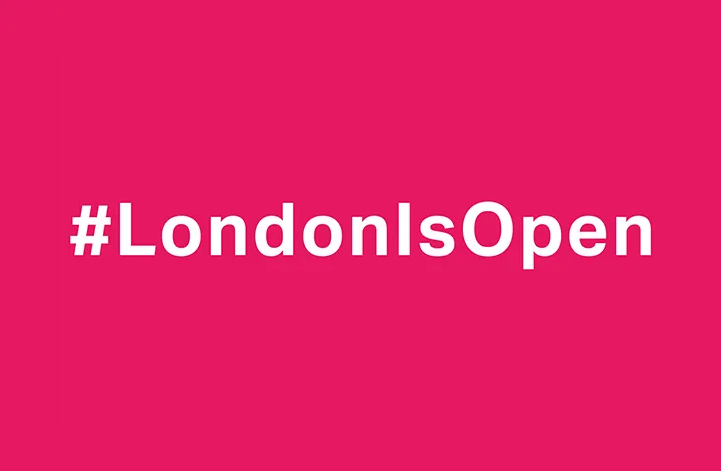
Flag flown at City Hall (2016)

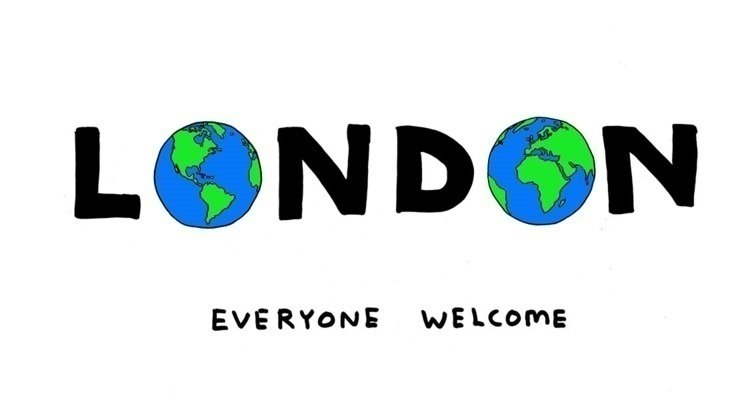
Flag flown at City Hall (2020)

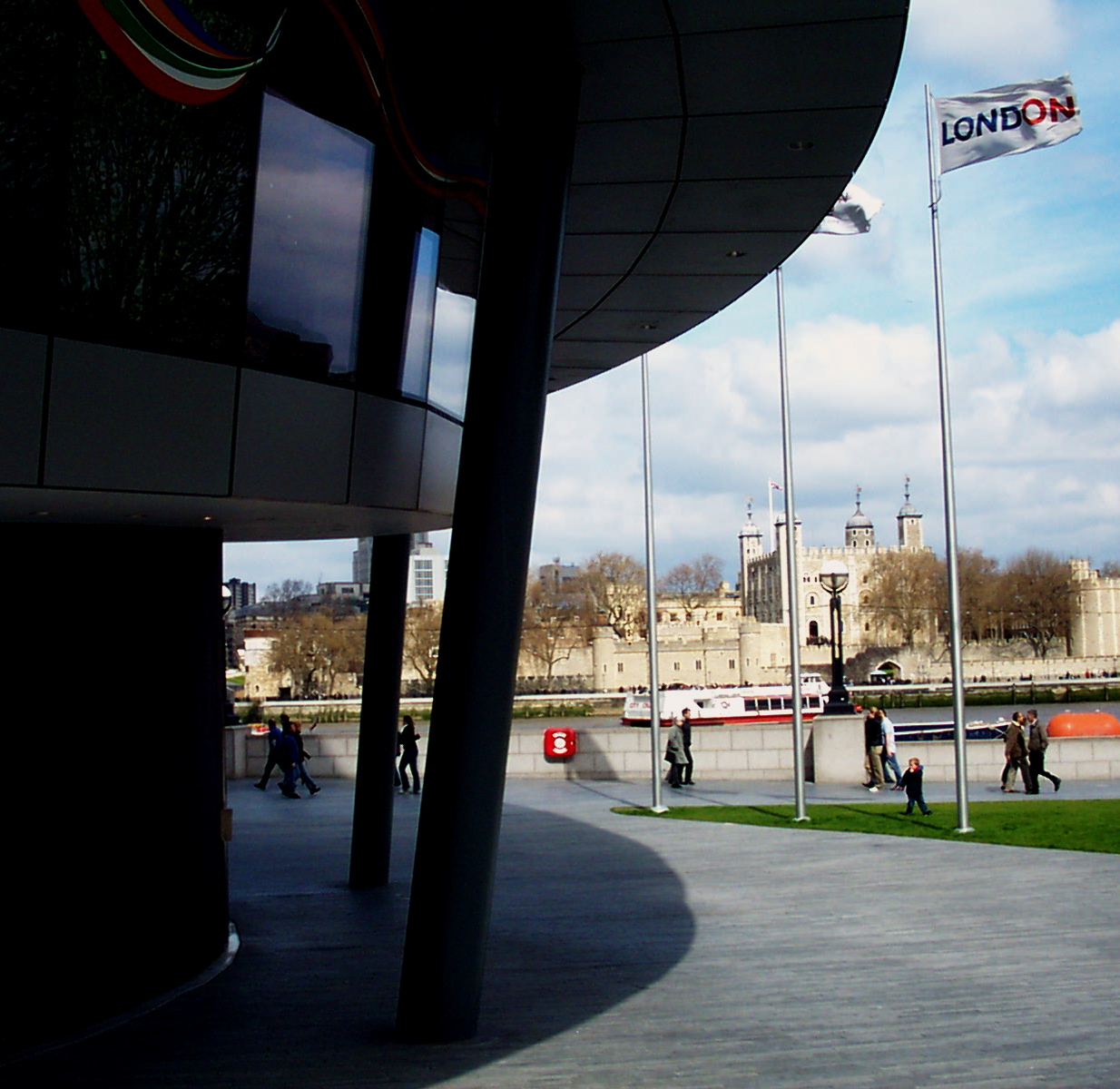
Flags being flown by the Greater London Authority outside City Hall in 2005

Wordmark of the London Development Agency (abolished in 2012)

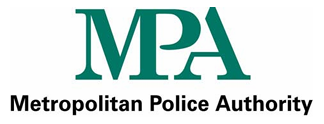
Logo of the Metropolitan Police Authority (abolished in 2012)

Logo of the London Fire and Emergency Planning Authority (abolished in 2018)

== See also ==
- Flag of the City of London
- Armorial of London
- History of local government in London
