= Armorial of London =

List of coats of arms of London

This is a list of coats of arms of London.

== Greater London ==
Coat of arms of the Greater London Authority

=== London borough councils ===
Coat of arms of Barking and Dagenham

Coat of arms of Barnet

Coat of arms of Bexley

Coat of arms of Brent

Coat of arms of Bromley

Coat of arms of Camden

Coat of arms of Croydon

Coat of arms of Ealing

Coat of arms of Enfield

Coat of arms of Greenwich

Coat of arms of Hackney

Coat of arms of Hammersmith and Fulham

Coat of arms of Haringey

Coat of arms of Harrow

Coat of arms of Havering

Coat of arms of Hillingdon

Coat of arms of Hounslow

Coat of arms of Islington

Coat of arms of Kensington and Chelsea

Coat of arms of Kingston upon Thames

Coat of arms of Lambeth

Coat of arms of Lewisham

Coat of arms of Merton

Coat of arms of Newham

Coat of arms of Redbridge

Coat of arms of Richmond upon Thames

Coat of arms of Southwark

Coat of arms of Sutton

Coat of arms of Tower Hamlets

Coat of arms of Waltham Forest

Coat of arms of Wandsworth

Coat of arms of Westminster

=== Institutions ===
Coat of arms of the Metropolitan Police

== City of London ==
Coat of arms of the City of London

=== City institutions ===
Coat of arms of the Port of London Authority

Coat of arms of the London Stock Exchange

Coat of arms of the City and Guilds of London Institute

=== Livery Companies ===
==== Great XII Companies ====
1. Worshipful Company of Mercers

2. Worshipful Company of Grocers

3. Worshipful Company of Drapers

4. Worshipful Company of Fishmongers

5. Worshipful Company of Goldsmiths

6. Worshipful Company of Skinners

7. Worshipful Company of Merchant Taylors

8. Worshipful Company of Haberdashers

9. Worshipful Company of Salters

10. Worshipful Company of Ironmongers

11. Worshipful Company of Vintners

12. Worshipful Company of Clothworkers

==== Others ====
13. Worshipful Company of Dyers

14. Worshipful Company of Brewers

15. Worshipful Company of Leathersellers

17. Worshipful Company of Barbers

18. Worshipful Company of Cutlers

19. Worshipful Company of Bakers

21. Worshipful Company of Tallow Chandlers

22. Worshipful Company of Armourers and Brasiers

23. Worshipful Company of Girdlers

26. Worshipful Company of Carpenters

28. Worshipful Company of Painter-Stainers

29. Worshipful Company of Curriers

30. Worshipful Company of Masons

32. Worshipful Company of Innholders

33. Worshipful Company of Founders

34. Worshipful Company of Poulters

36. Worshipful Company of Coopers

39. Worshipful Company of Fletchers

40. Worshipful Company of Blacksmiths

41. Worshipful Company of Joiners and Ceilers

42. Worshipful Company of Weavers

44. Worshipful Company of Scriveners

47. Worshipful Company of Stationers and Newspaper Makers

48. Worshipful Company of Broderers

50. Worshipful Company of Musicians

51. Worshipful Company of Turners

55. Worshipful Company of Farriers

59. Worshipful Company of Shipwrights

60. Worshipful Company of Spectacle Makers

65. Worshipful Company of Needlemakers

67. Worshipful Company of Tin Plate Workers

68. Worshipful Company of Wheelwrights

73. Worshipful Company of Gunmakers

75. Worshipful Company of Makers of Playing Cards

77. Worshipful Company of Carmen

78. Honourable Company of Master Mariners

80. Worshipful Company of Farmers

84. Worshipful Company of Scientific Instrument Makers

100. Worshipful Company of Information Technologists

108. Worshipful Company of Security Professionals

=== Guilds and Companies without Livery ===
Company of Watermen and Lightermen

== Academic ==
=== Schools ===
Arnold House School

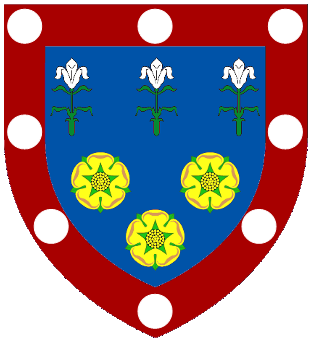
Barking Abbey School

The Campion School

City of London School (adopted arms of the City of London)

Dulwich College

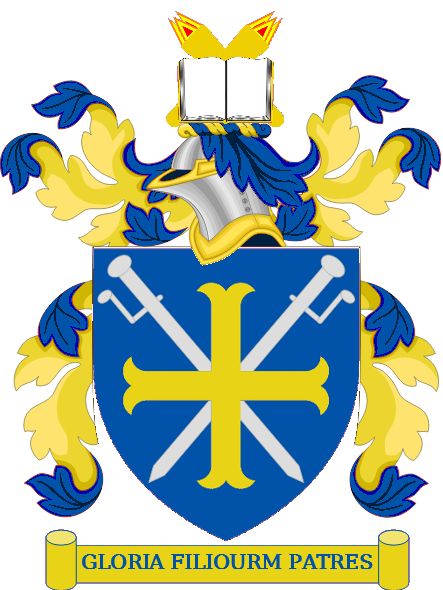
Eltham College

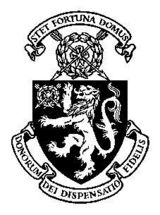
Harrow School

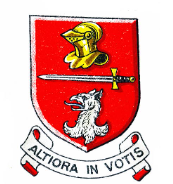
Highgate School

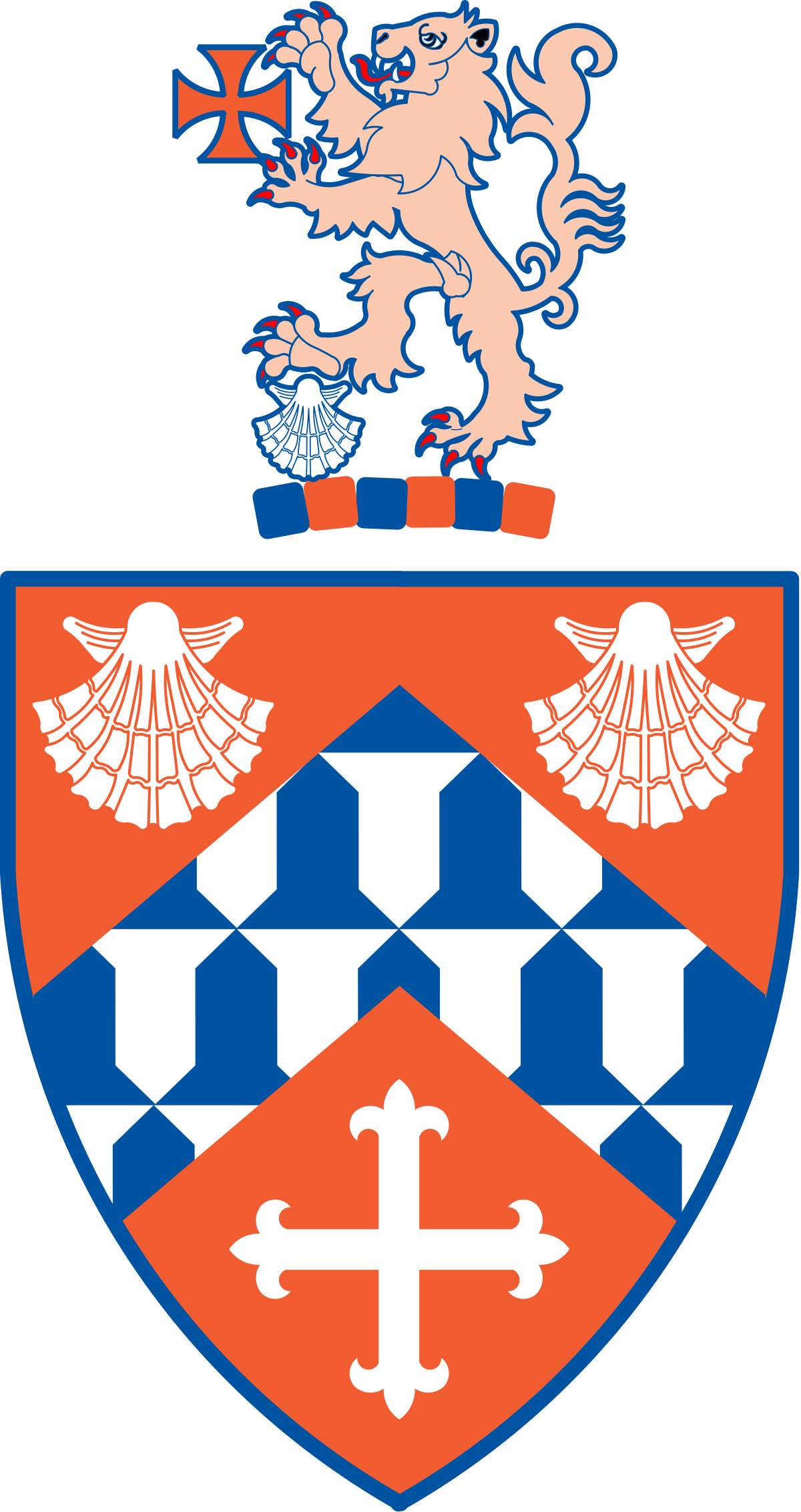
Hill House International Junior School

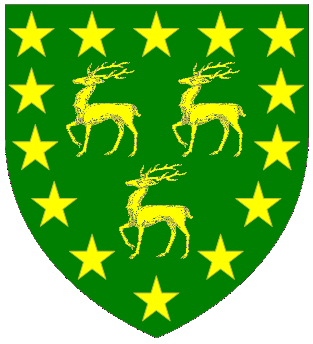
The John Roan School

Langley Park School for Boys

Latymer Upper School

The London Oratory School

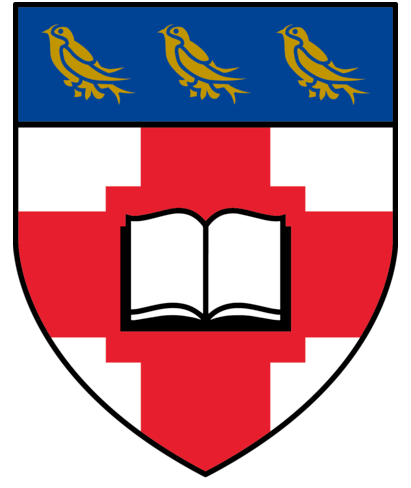
Mill Hill School

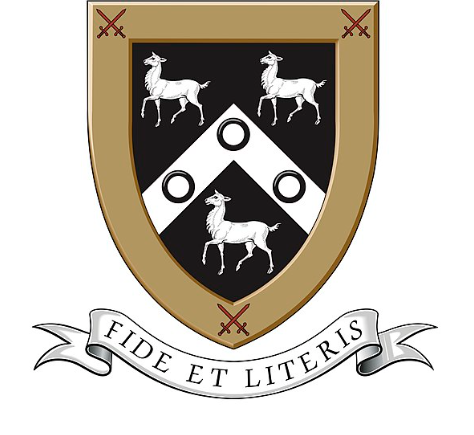
St Paul's School

Westminster School

=== Universities & constituent colleges ===
Escutcheons only. For the full achievement see the linked articles.

University of the Arts London

Birkbeck, University of London

Brunel University London

City, University of London

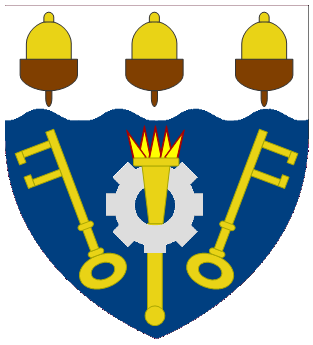
University of East London

London School of Economics

Goldsmiths, University of London

University of Greenwich

Imperial College London

King's College London

Kingston University London

University of Law

University of London

London Metropolitan University

Middlesex University London (adopted arms of Middlesex)

London College of Music (University of West London)

St Mary's University, Twickenham

SOAS University of London

London South Bank University

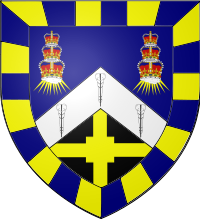
Queen Mary University of London

Richmond American University London

Royal Veterinary College

== Societies ==
Coat of arms of the British Interplanetary Society

Coat of arms of the Linnean Society of London

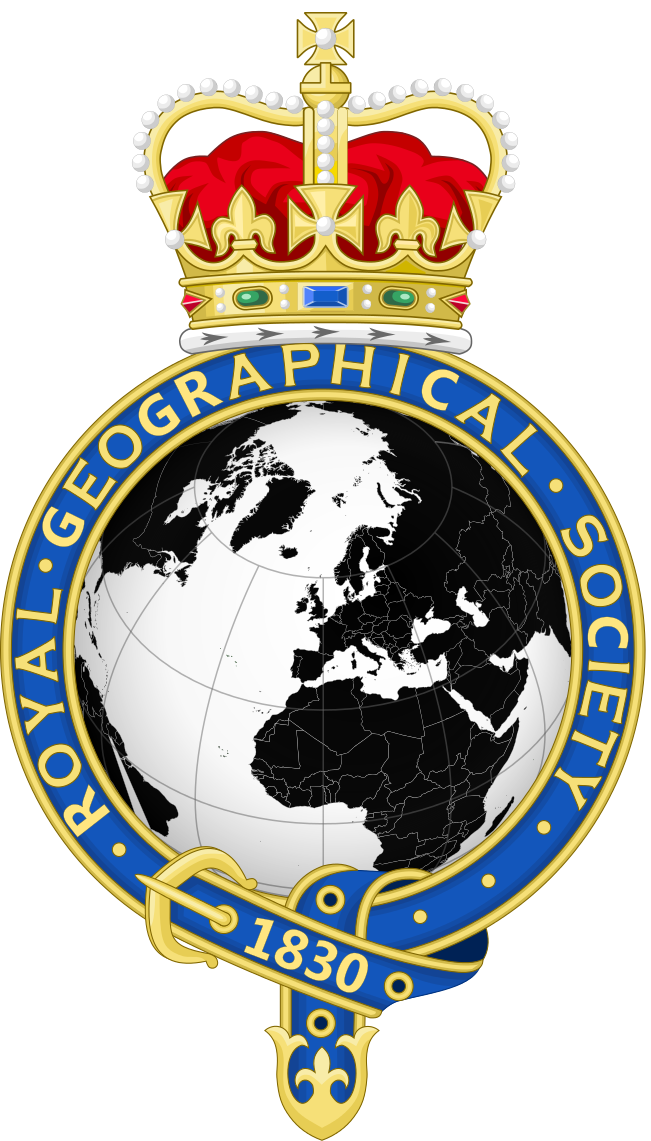
Badge of the Royal Geographical Society (no longer in use)

Coat of arms of the Royal Society

Coat of arms of the Royal Society of Chemistry

Coat of arms of the Royal Society of Arts

== Historic ==
Coat of arms of Middlesex, 1910-1965 (absorbed into Greater London)

Coat of arms of the London County Council, 1914-1965

Coat of arms of the Greater London Council, 1965-1986 (transferred to the Greater London Authority in 2025)

=== Metropolitan boroughs (1900-1965) ===
Between 1900 and 1965 the former County of London (covering an area now referred to as Inner London) was divided into metropolitan boroughs.

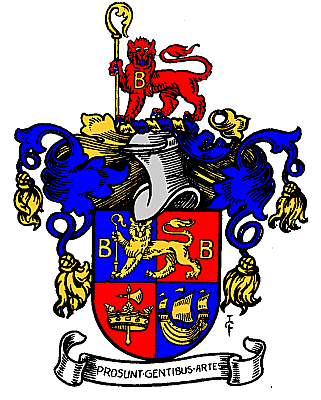
Bermondsey

Bethnal Green

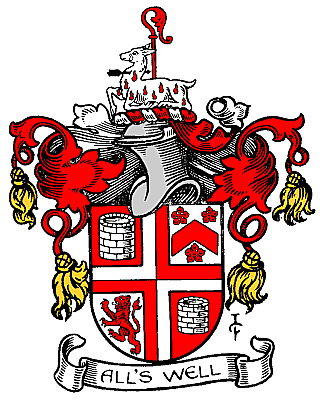
Camberwell

Chelsea

Deptford

Finsbury

Fulham

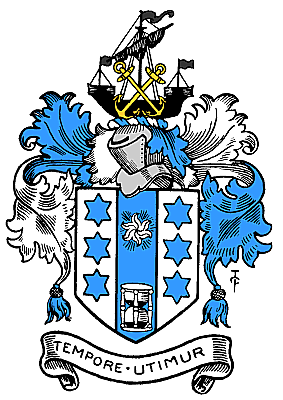
Greenwich

Hackney

Hammersmith

Hampstead

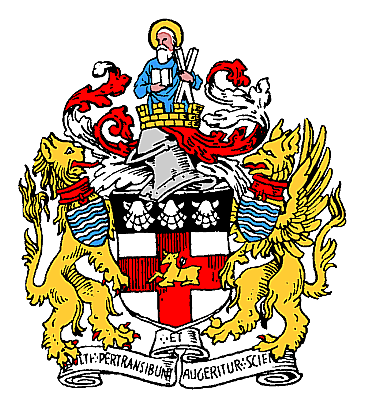
Holborn

Islington

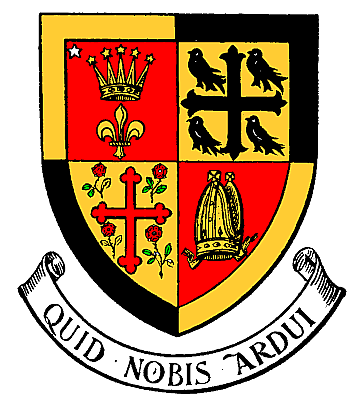
Kensington

Lambeth

Lewisham

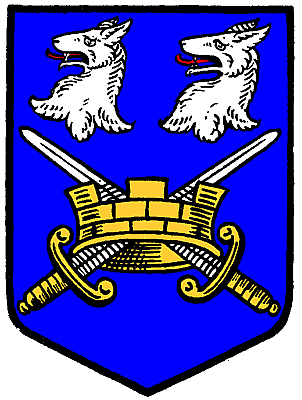
Paddington

Poplar

Shoreditch

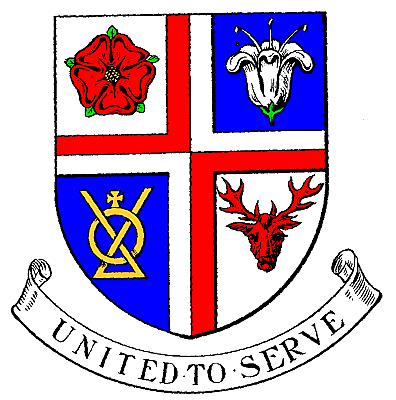
Southwark

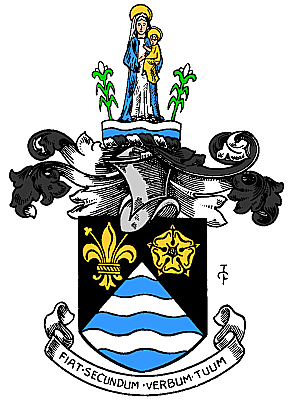
Marylebone

St Pancras (unofficial, used from 1901 until official arms granted in 1936)

Stepney

Stoke Newington

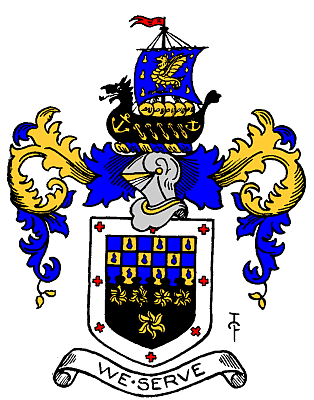
Wandsworth

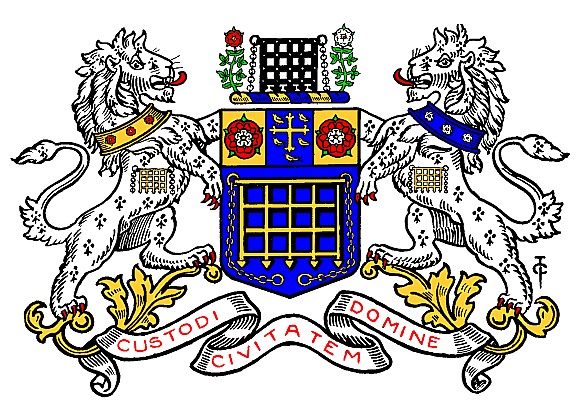
Westminster

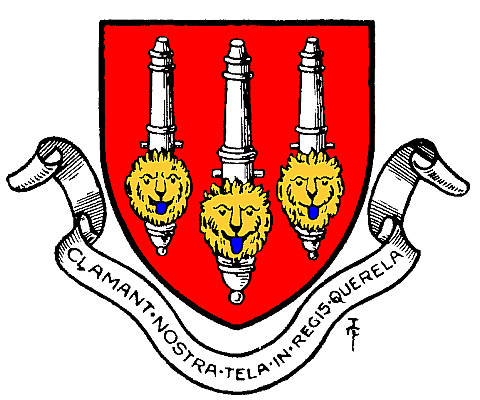
Woolwich

=== Other former boroughs and districts ===
These are the other former metropolitan boroughs and districts which belonged to Middlesex, Surrey, Essex, Kent and Hertfordshire before 1965 and were transferred to Greater London that year. (Note: Harrow is excluded because its arms, like its area, remained unaltered when it became a London Borough).

Acton

Barking

Barnes

Barnet

Beckenham

Beddington and Wallington

Bexley

Brentford and Chiswick

Bromley

Carshalton

Chingford

Chislehurst and Sidcup

Coulsdon and Purley

Crayford

Croydon

Dagenham

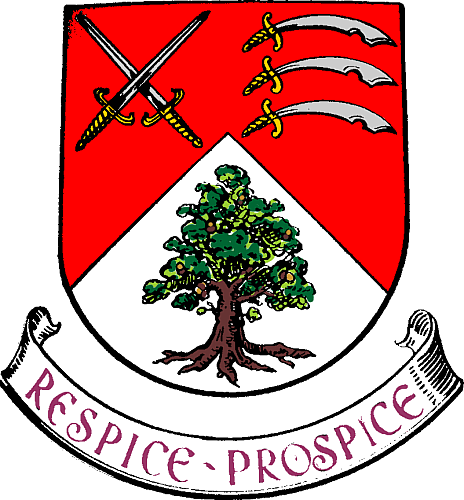
Ealing

East Barnet

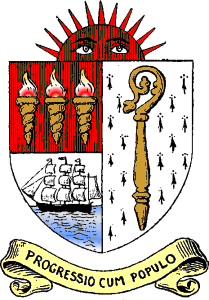
East Ham

Edmonton

Enfield

Erith

Feltham

Finchley

Friern Barnet

Hayes and Harlington

Hendon

Heston and Isleworth

Hornchurch

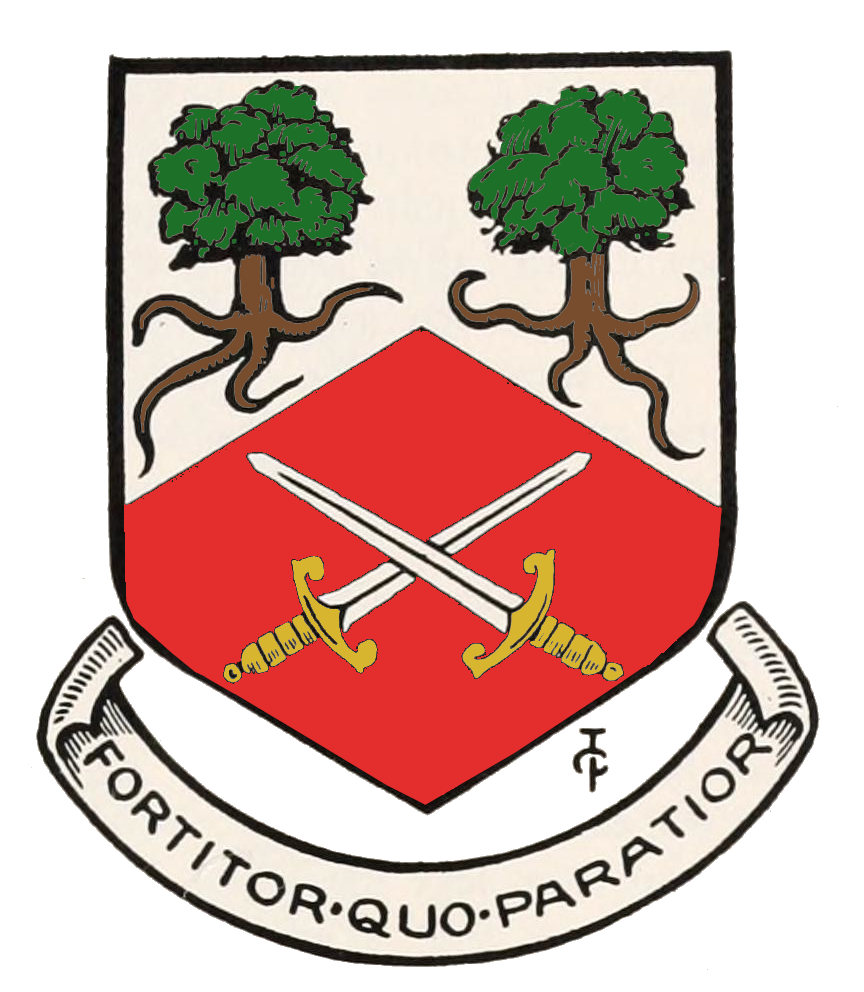
Hornsey

Ilford

Kingston upon Thames

Malden and Coombe

Merton and Morden

Mitcham

Orpington

Penge

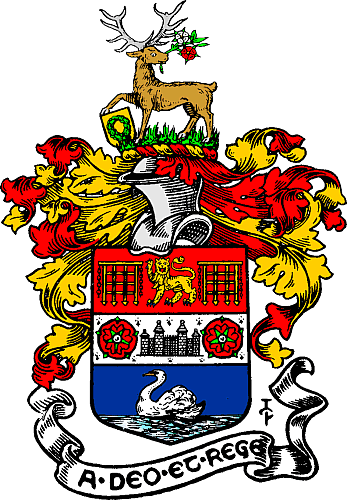
Richmond

Romford

Ruislip-Northwood

Southall

Southgate

Surbiton

Sutton and Cheam

Tottenham

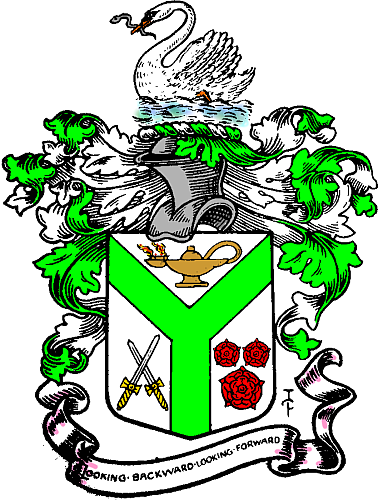
Twickenham

Uxbridge

Walthamstow

Wanstead and Woodford

Wembley

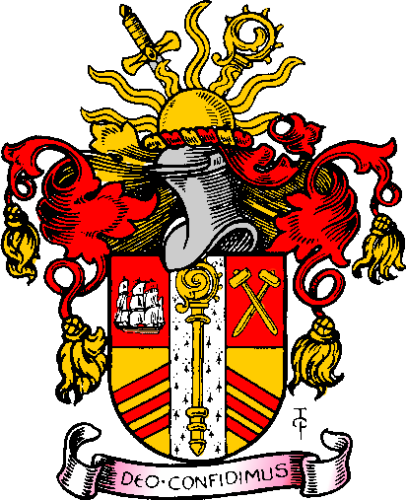
West Ham

Willesden

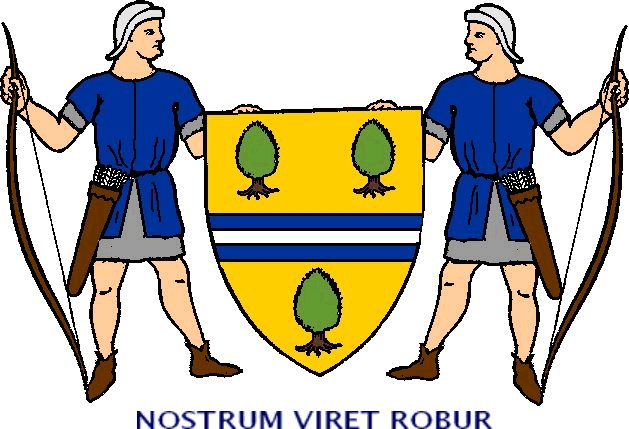
Wood Green

Yiewsley and West Drayton

== See also ==
- Armorial of the United Kingdom
- Armorial of county councils of England
- History of London
