= History of King's College London =

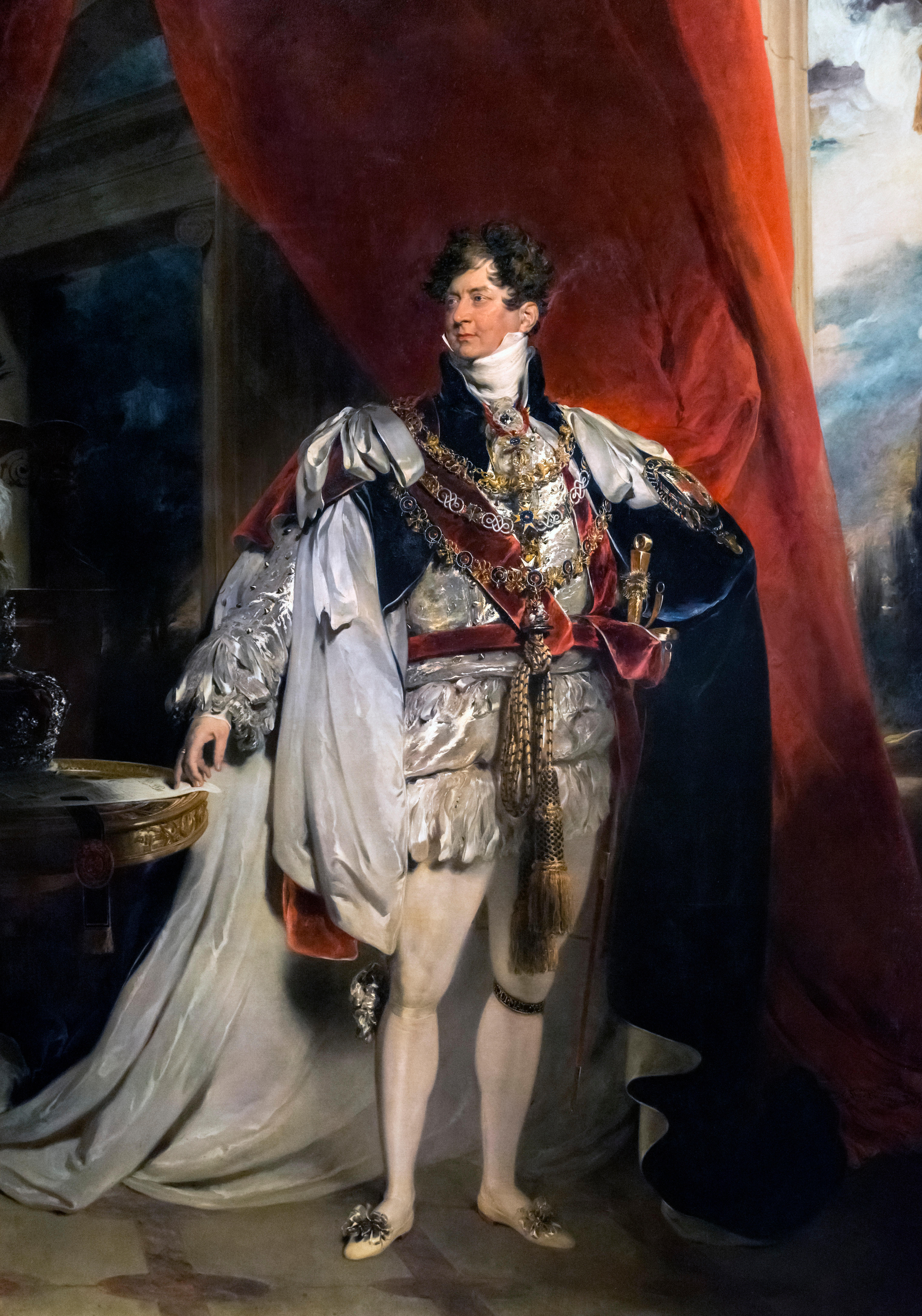
King's College London was granted a royal charter in 1829 by its patron, King George IV. Portrait by Sir Thomas Lawrence

The history of King's College London, on its own, spans over 190 years since it was founded as a 'university college' by royal charter in 1829. However, its formation as a full 'university' would have to wait until 1836 as a part of the University of London. The full history, however, includes the medical schools that now constitute GKT School of Medical Education. This incorporates St Thomas's Hospital Medical School, one of the oldest medical schools in Britain, with a history of medical teaching that can be traced back to at least 1561. St Thomas' Hospital itself dates back to 1173, and has roots in the establishment of St Mary Overie Priory in 1106.

== 19th century ==
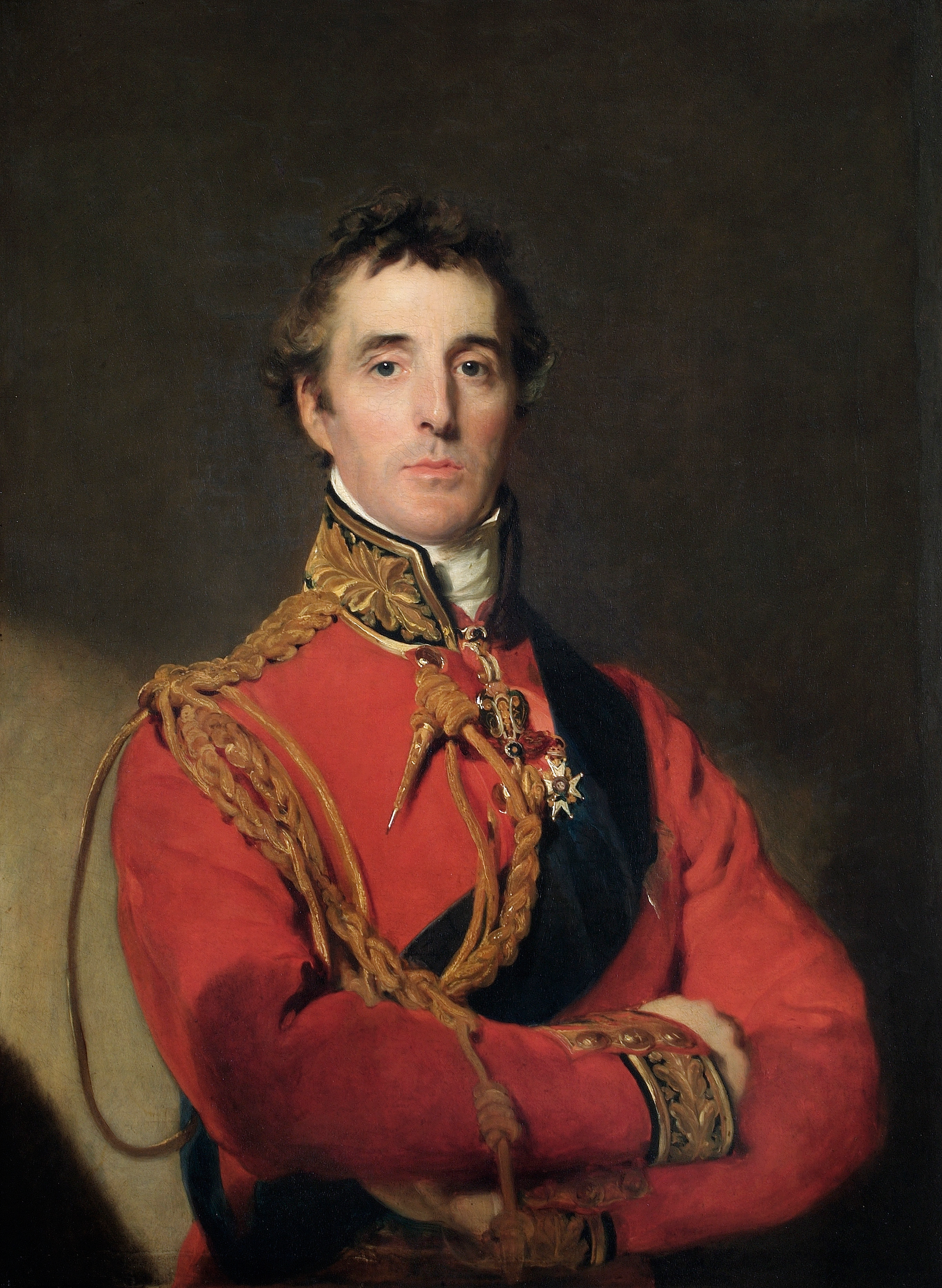
Arthur Wellesley, 1st Duke of Wellington and then-Prime Minister of the United Kingdom, fought the Wellington–Winchilsea duel against the Earl of Winchilsea in 1829 over the Duke's support for the rights of Irish Catholics and the independence of the newly established King's College London

=== Foundation ===
King's College was founded as a 'university college' in 1829 in response to the theological controversy surrounding the founding of "London University" (which later became University College London) in 1826. London University was founded, with the backing of Utilitarians, Jews and non-Anglican Christians, as a secular institution, intended to educate "the youth of our middling rich people between the ages of 15 or 16 and 20 or later" giving its nickname, "the godless college in Gower Street".

The seeds of the idea that would become King's College were planted in a sermon in October 1826 by Hugh James Rose – then Christian Advocate at the University of Cambridge, later the first Professor of Divinity at Durham University and the second Principal of King's. A year later, on 30 October 1827, a letter from 'Alpha' appeared in the Morning Post (a London newspaper of the time) which criticised London University strongly for its lack of religion and called for 'the establishment of a London University upon legitimate and constitutional principles'. This 'true and genuine "London University"' was to be established by royal charter and act of Parliament, it would have professors "attached to the natural religion of the State", and was 'to be called the "Academia Georgii Quarti quæ Londini est," the same as the University of Edinburgh is called the "Academia Jacobi Sexti"'. The next day another letter in the Morning Post from 'Omega' promised that 'whenever such a project may be attempted, my mite shall be forthcoming'. A leading article on 1 November said that the letter from 'Alpha' had 'been the predecessor of a host of others' agreeing with him in his criticism of London University. This brought forth a response from 'Alpha' starting that 'it will soon be seen whether "The College of King George the IVth," which takes Religion as the Rock of its foundation, and the Church of England as its wall of strength, or the self-styled "University of London,"...will produce to this yet happy empire the most fertilising stream', adding that 'measures are in progress for forming a legitimate "London University"' (emphases in original).

The concept of the college was defined publicly in early 1828 by George D'Oyly, Rector of Lambeth, in an open letter to Sir Robert Peel, the then Home Secretary and Leader of the House of Commons. The letter advocated establishing a second university in London, which would be like London University in teaching modern subjects but would have a distinctly Christian ethos, and was decisive in winning the backing of the Prime Minister, the Duke of Wellington, for the scheme. The King's College project was officially launched at a public meeting at the Freemasons' Hall on 21 June 1828, chaired by the Prime Minister and attended by the archbishops of York, Canterbury and Armagh, Charles James Blomfield, the Bishop of London, and a number of other bishops (including, William Van Mildert, Bishop of Durham, who founded Durham University a few years later, and John Banks Jenkinson, Bishop of St David's and Dean of Durham, who had secured the royal charter for St David's College, Lampeter earlier that year) and two other members of the Cabinet (Peel and the Earl of Aberdeen). The meeting passed resolutions to found the college, to request permission from the King to name it 'King's College, London', to approve the general scheme that had been drawn up, to appoint a provisional committee of twenty-seven (chaired by Bishop Blomfield) to raise funds and to frame regulations and building plans, and to open books for donations and subscriptions at the major banks.

After the Duke had withdrawn, along with the Archbishops and the Bishops of London, Durham and Carlisle, the Bishop of Chester took the chair to deny reports that the college would be open only to Anglicans. While the college was to be Anglican, and its professors would have to belong to the established church, it would be open to students of any religion, although they would have to submit to the regulations of the college.

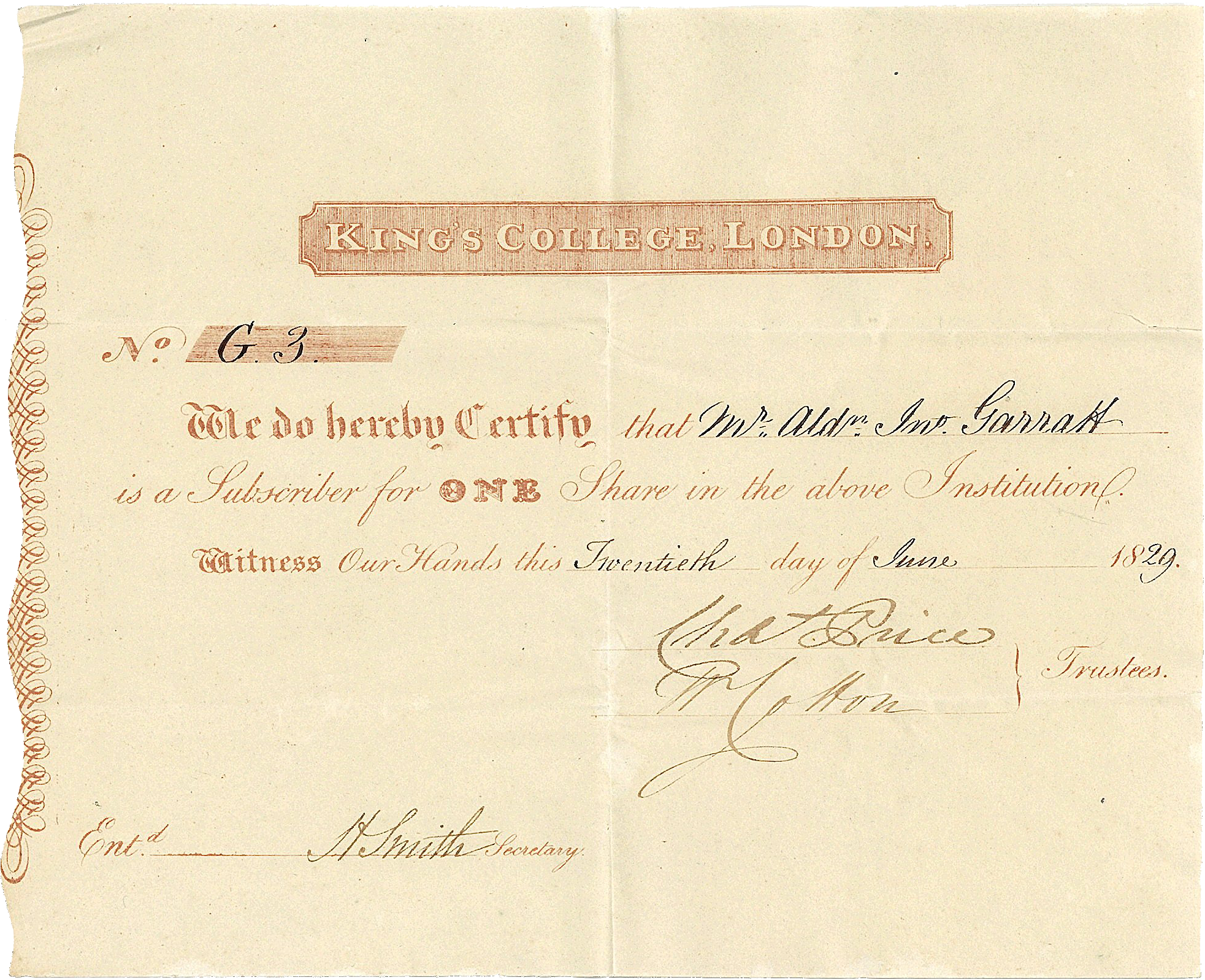
King's College of London subscription certificate for one share to the value of £100, issued 20 June 1829, registered to Alderman Garratt, 1824 Lord Mayor of the City of London, signed in original by William Cotton as Trustee

At the meeting, some £20,000 of the total of £100,000 needed (elsewhere said to be £150,000) was pledged. By the start of July, this had risen to over £50,000. However, disputes over Wellington and Peel's support for Catholic emancipation (see below) meant that many of the project's backers withdrew their pledges, leading to a shortfall in the sum raised by subscriptions and donations.

Several potential sites for King's were discussed by the provisional committee, including Buckingham Palace and Regent's Park. In December 1828, Peel proposed to the Bishop of London that the college be granted a site between the Strand and the Thames, running parallel to the yet unfinished Somerset House at a peppercorn rent in perpetuity. This was accepted, despite concerns of the effect of the nearby slums and theatres on the Strand on students' health and morals, and the grant was made in June 1829, with the condition that the river-front be completed in five years, matching the design of Somerset House, and the rest of the college in ten. The architect Robert Smirke was selected to design the building, and plans were approved (scaled back from the original budget of £150,000) in July 1829.

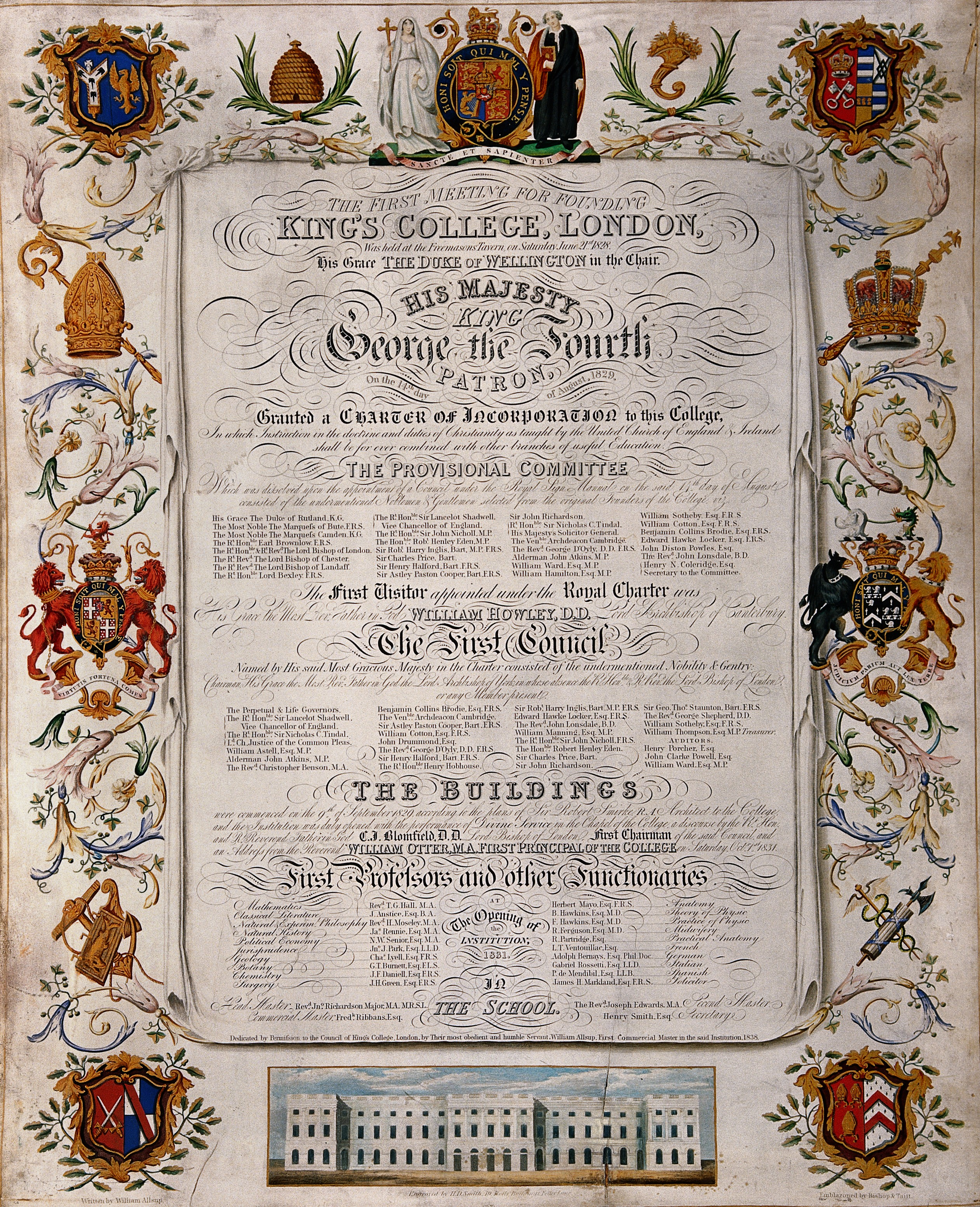
Coloured engraving by H. D. Smith celebrating the foundation of King's College London

With the site selected and construction ready to begin, a royal charter incorporating 'King's College, London' was granted by George IV on 14 August 1829, stating the intention of the new educational institution:

...for the general education of youth in which the various branches of Literature and Science are intended to be taught, and also the doctrines and duties of Christianity... inculcated by the United Church of England and Ireland.

— Royal charter incorporating King's College, London, 14 August 1829.

Now the college was established as a legal entity with a defined constitution, the provisional committee handed over the management of the project to the College Council. The charter vested the government of the college in this council, consisting of nine official governors, five of whom were clergy, eight life governors, a treasurer, and 24 other members of the corporation. King's College, as established by the royal charter, was a for-profit college with dividends payable to proprietors of up to four per cent of profits, similar (save for King's being incorporated) to the joint stock company of London University. Despite it not being a charity, the Archbishop of Canterbury was appointed Visitor to the college by the charter.

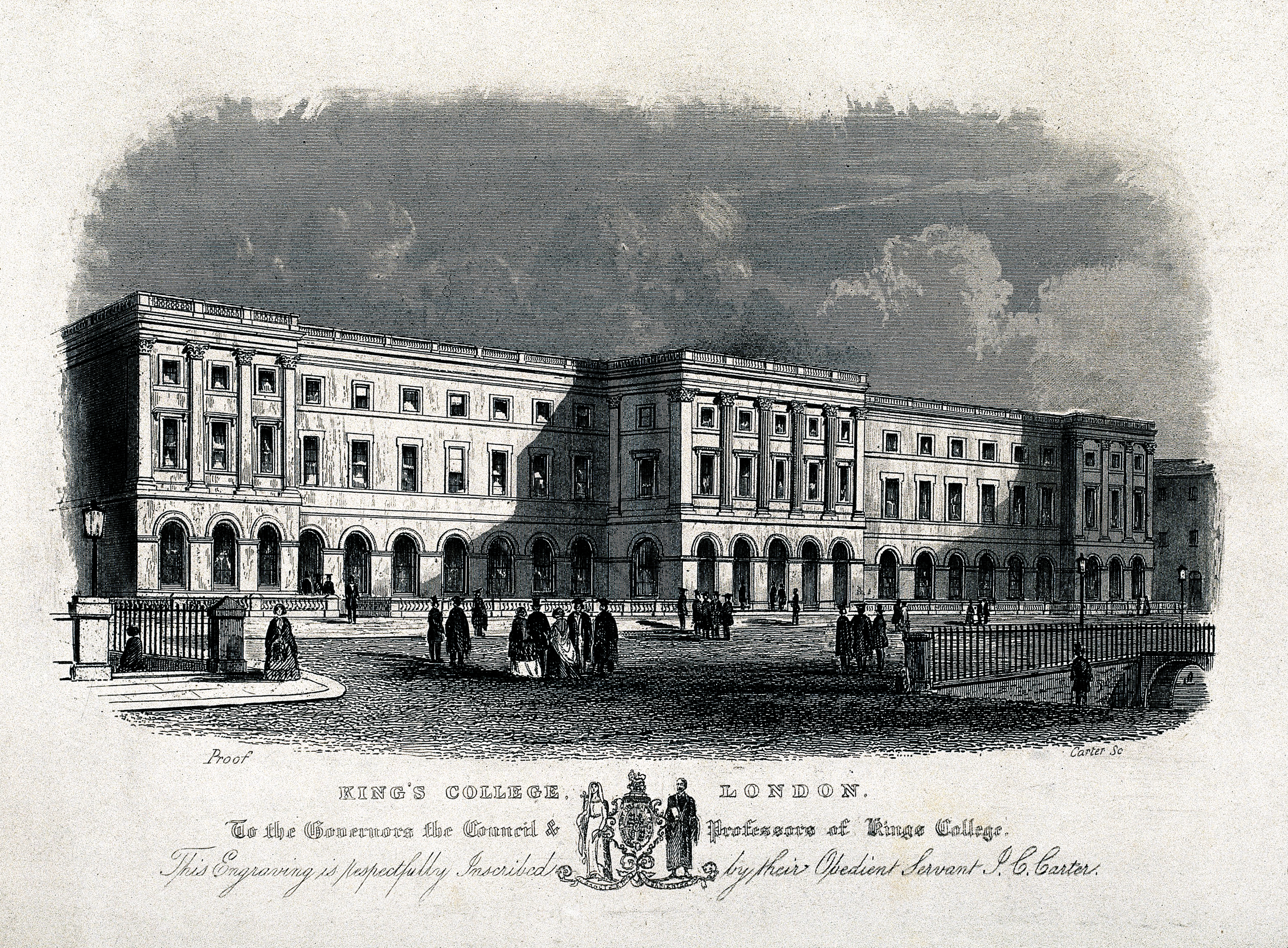
King's College London in 1831. Engraved by J. C. Carter

On 26 November 1829, the contract for the building work was let. Under this contract, the body of the building was to cost just under £64,000 and was to be completed by 1 December 1831. As it happened, work on the "carcass" of the building was completed by late 1830 and fitting out began. The main building, including the hall and the chapel, was finished for the opening of the college on 8 October 1831, although a lot of building and fitting remained to be completed elsewhere on the site. The cost so far had been £85,900 out of £113,600 raised.

==== 1829 Duel in Battersea Fields ====
The Duke of Wellington's simultaneous support for an Anglican King's College London and the Roman Catholic Relief Act, which was to lead to the granting of almost full civil rights to Catholics, was challenged by George Finch-Hatton, 10th Earl of Winchilsea, in early 1829. Winchilsea and his supporters wished for King's to be subject to the Test Acts, like the universities of Oxford, where only members of the Church of England could matriculate, and Cambridge, where non-Anglicans could matriculate but not graduate, but this was not Wellington's intent.

Winchilsea and about 150 other contributors withdrew their support of King's College London in response to Wellington's support of Catholic emancipation. Accusations against Wellington were published in a letter to The Standard newspaper on 14 March where Winchilsea charged the Prime Minister with insincerity in his support for King's College London. In a letter to Wellington he wrote, "I have come to view the college as an instrument in a wider programme designed to promote the Roman Catholic faith and undermine the established church." Winchilsea also accused the Duke to have in mind "insidious designs for the infringement of our liberty and the introduction of Popery into every department of the State".

The letter provoked a furious exchange of correspondence and Wellington accused Winchilsea of imputing him with "disgraceful and criminal motives" in setting up King's College London. When Winchilsea refused to retract the remarks, Wellington – by his own admission, "no advocate of duelling" and a virgin duellist – demanded satisfaction in a contest of arms: "I now call upon your lordship to give me that satisfaction for your conduct which a gentleman has a right to require, and which a gentleman never refuses to give."

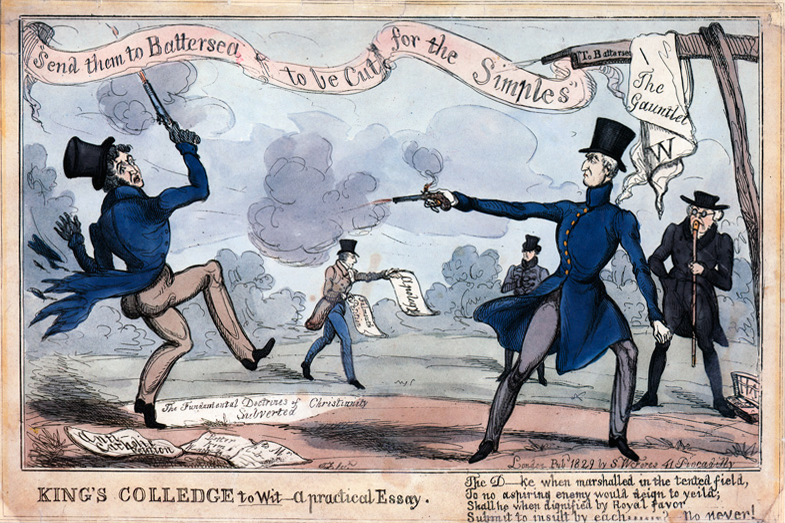
King's College London to Wit. The duel in Battersea Fields on 21 March 1829 by Thomas Howell Jones

The result was a duel in Battersea Fields on 21 March 1829. Winchilsea did not fire, a plan he and his second almost certainly decided upon before the duel; Wellington took aim and fired wide to the right. Accounts differ as to whether Wellington missed on purpose. Wellington, noted for his poor aim, claimed he did, other reports more sympathetic to Winchilsea claimed he had aimed to kill. Honour was saved and Winchilsea wrote Wellington an apology. "Duel Day" is still celebrated on the first Thursday after 21 March every year, marked by various events throughout King's, including re-enactments.

=== Early years ===
William Otter (1831–36), the first Principal of King's College London

King's opened in October 1831 with the cleric William Otter appointed as first principal and lecturer in divinity. In keeping with the intention stated back in 1828, and despite the chapel at the heart of its buildings, the initial prospectus permitted, "nonconformists of all sorts to enter the college freely". William Howley, the Archbishop of Canterbury, presided over the opening ceremony in which sermons was given in the chapel by the Archbishop on the importance of charity and by Charles James Blomfield, the Bishop of London, on the subject of combining religious instruction with intellectual culture. The governors and the professors, except the linguists, had to be members of the Church of England but the students did not, though attendance at Chapel was compulsory.

King's was divided into a senior department and a junior department, also known as King's College School, which was originally situated in the basement of the Strand Campus. The Junior department started with 85 pupils and only three teachers, but quickly grew to 500 by 1841, outgrowing its facilities and leading it to relocate to Wimbledon in 1897 where it remains today, though it is no longer associated with King's College London. Within the Senior department teaching was divided into three courses. A general course comprised divinity, classical languages, mathematics, English literature and history. Secondly, there was the medical course. Thirdly, miscellaneous subjects, such as law, political economy and modern languages, which were not related to any systematic course of study at the time and depended for their continuance on the supply of occasional students. In 1833 the general course was reorganised leading to the award of the Associate of King's College (AKC), the first qualification issued by King's. The course, which concerns questions of ethics and theology, is still awarded today to students and staff who take an optional three-year course alongside their studies.

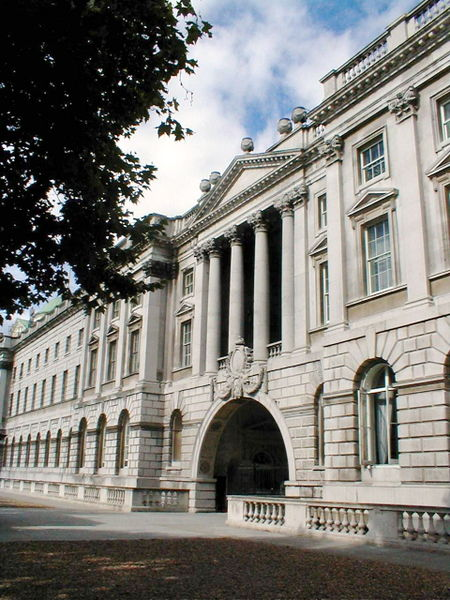
The Embankment terrace entrance to the Strand Campus overlooking the River Thames, originally designed by Sir William Chambers, was completed by Sir Robert Smirke in 1835

Following a further appeal for funds in 1832, the river frontage was completed in April 1835 at a cost of £7,100, its completion a condition of King's College London securing the site from the Crown. Unlike those in the school, student numbers in the Senior department remained almost stationary during King's first five years of existence. During this time the medical school was blighted by inefficiency and the divided loyalties of the staff leading to a steady decline in attendance. One of the most important appointments was that of Charles Wheatstone as professor of Experimental Philosophy.

At this time, neither King's, nor "London University", had the ability to confer degrees, nor did the Medical schools at the London hospitals. Henry Brougham, chairman of the governors of "London University", became Lord Chancellor in 1830, in which position he automatically became a governor of King's. "London University" applied for a royal charter in 1830 that would (unlike King's charter as a college) recognise it as a university, thus giving it the right to grant degrees. This charter was approved by the government lawyers, but blocked by Oxford and Cambridge before it could receive the Great Seal. The application was renewed in 1833 and debated by the Privy Council in 1834. King's did not join Oxford, Cambridge and the Medical schools in objecting to the charter, but it was clear that if "London University" received degree awarding powers and official status as a university, the same would be expected for King's. However, before the issue could be resolved the Whig government fell, removing Brougham from office.

In 1835, following a "prayer" to the King from the House of Commons to grant "London University" their charter, the government announced that it would establish a separate examining board to grant degrees, with "London University" and King's both being affiliated colleges in Arts and Laws. This became the University of London in 1836, the former "London University" becoming University College, London (UCL). The governors at King's were offended at the exclusion of divinity from the syllabus of the university, and advised students to take the Oxford or Cambridge examinations. However, the power of the university to confer degrees marked a period of limited expansion at King's.

In early 1836, Bishop van Mildert of Durham died. The new Bishop of Durham was Edward Maltby, one of the founders of UCL and then Bishop of Chichester. William Otter was appointed Bishop of Chichester in his place, leaving a vacancy as Principal of King's that was filled by Hugh James Rose, who had been Professor of Divinity at Durham. Both Maltby and Otter were named to the Senate of the new University of London in late 1836.

Maltby had resigned as preacher of Lincoln's Inn in 1835, his replacement there was John Lonsdale, a member of King's College's Council who had been offered, but refused, the post of Principal at the foundation of the college. When Rose's health failed in 1838, Lonsdale stepped in as acting principal of King's, taking the job on a permanent basis in 1839 when news of Rose's death in Italy reached England. He held the post until 1843, when he was appointed Bishop of Lichfield. His successor as Principal was Richard William Jelf, a canon of Oxford Cathedral, who held the post until 1868.

In 1838, King's set up only the second engineering course in Britain, which was (as the course established at Durham closed after only a few years) the oldest department of engineering in the country until its closure in 2013. The study of English Literature as a distinct subject was also pioneered by King's.

Also in 1838, the Pluralities Act 1838 (1 & 2 Vict. c. 106) was passed, making it illegal for Church of England clergy to live outside of their parish. An exemption was, however, made for the "Principal of King's College, London, during the Time for which he may be required to reside and shall actually reside therein", allowing the principal to hold a benefice elsewhere yet reside in the college.

=== Mid 19th century development ===
In 1839, the first degrees of the University of London were awarded to King's and UCL students. The Principal, John Lonsdale, stated publicly at the college prizegiving that year that "it was probable that the greater number of pupils educated in King's College for the three learned professions might proceed from that place to the Universities of Oxford and Cambridge, and that therefore it would not be a matter of surprise of but a few degrees were conferred by the London University upon their pupils". Throughout the 19th century, the Calendar of King's College listed "University Distinctions" gained at Oxford and Cambridge (and later Durham) before those gained at London. By 1845, King's had reached an agreement with the University of Edinburgh whereby medical students could spend three of the four years necessary for the degree of MD at the college, only having to pass one year in residence in Edinburgh.

In 1840, King's opened its own hospital on Portugal Street near Lincoln's Inn Fields, an area composed of overcrowded rookeries characterised by poverty and disease. The governance of King's College Hospital was later transferred to the corporation of the hospital established by the King's College Hospital Act 1851, and eventually moved to new premises in Denmark Hill, Camberwell in 1913. The appointment in 1877 of Joseph Lister as professor of clinical surgery greatly benefited the medical school, and the introduction of Lister's antiseptic surgical methods gained the hospital an international reputation.

In 1845, the Military Department was established following the identification of a need for more educated officers, the Army being "the only profession excluded from collegiate advantages". The department was advertised as "intended for the benefit of the numerous class of Gentlemen who may be expecting Commissions in the Army, or direct appointments in the Honourable East India Company's service".

King's established a Theological Department to train Anglican priests in 1846, predating those at Oxford or Cambridge. This recognised degrees from Oxford, Cambridge and Durham, and the AKC, but did not recognise London degrees. The Theological AKC, awarded by the King's Theological Department until 1976, was from 1862 marked by a silk hood lined with mauve silk by special permission of the Archbishop of Canterbury (John Sumner). This was very similar to the Durham MA hood, leading to protests. Following representations to the Archbishop of Canterbury (Edward White Benson) in 1884 by the Durham University Association, the hood was revised to conform with the pattern approved for theological colleges, with the change backdated to 1882. The new hood was poplin, rather than silk, with a 1-inch edging of mauve silk, rather than fully lined.

In 1851 F. D. Maurice, professor of theology and of English literature and history at King's, was accused of heterodoxy over his support of Christian Socialism. Jelfs suggested he should resign his professorships, but accepted Maurice's denial of some of the charges. With Lonsdale supporting Maurice, committee of investigation found in his favour. In 1853, Maurice published his Theological Essays, and once again was placed under investigation. This time, with Lonsdale having failed to receive an invitation to attend the meeting, Council agreed with Blomfield's motion that "the continuance of Professor Maurice's connection with the College … would be seriously detrimental to its usefulness". Maurice asked the council to say which of the 39 articles his teaching contradicted, bit they declined to answer and he was forced to leave immediately, without completing the courses he was then teaching. Lonsdale was very critical of the proceedings, saying there was no authority for the council's condemnation of Maurice as heretical, and Maurice's treatment was regarded by many as "a gross injustice".

In 1855, King's pioneered evening classes in London. That King's granted students at the evening classes certificates of college attendance to enable them to sit University of London degree exams was cited as an example of the worthlessness of these certificates in the decision by the University of London to end the affiliated colleges system in 1858 and open their examinations to everyone.

The controversy over the hoods did not stop the Theological Department becoming affiliated to Durham University in 1876, allowing holders of the Theological AKC to take Durham BAs with only a year of residence in Durham. This and the addition of evening classes to the Theological Department enabled it to recover from only 24 students in 1876 to 79 in 1881, overtaking the General Department, which fell to 39 students in 1884.

=== Government Funding ===
In 1874 the fifth report of the Royal Commission on Scientific Instruction and the Advancement of Science found that the pay for teaching staff at King's was inadequate and that the main obstacle to figure success was "that it is so extremely poor". The commissioners concluded that "[King's and UCL] have established a claim to the aid of government that ought to be admitted", recommending that both colleges should receive an annual grant to cover their running costs and capital grants to cover buildings and equipment. They also recommended that before King's received such a grant, the college should apply for a new charter or an Act of Parliament to remove the proprietary rights of the shareholders and to remove religious restrictions on professors of science and on privileges granted to students.

In 1882 the King's College London Act amended the constitution. The act removed the proprietorial nature of the college, changing the name of the corporation from "The Governors and Proprietors of King's College London" to "King's College London" and annulling the 1829 charter (although the college remained incorporated under that charter). The act also changing the college from a (technically) for-profit corporation to a non-profit one (no dividends had ever been paid in over 50 years of operation) and extended the objects of King's to include the education of women. The Ladies' Department of King's College London was opened in Kensington Square in 1885, which later in 1902 became King's College Women's Department.. The 1882 act did not, however, remove the religious restrictions on the staff, as recommended by the Royal Commission.

Despite this, in 1889 King's became one of 11 university colleges to be awarded funding through the "Grant to University Colleges in Great Britain". King's received £1,700, the same as UCL and more than any other institution except Owens College, Manchester.

=== Reform of the University of London ===
In 1884, King's allied with UCL and the London medical schools to launch the Association for Promotion of a Teaching University for London. After attempts to reform the University of London failed, the idea was proposed that King's, UCL and the medical schools would join to form a federal university, to be known as the Albert University.

A Royal Commission was established in 1888 to look into the matter. This reported in 1889, recommending reform of the University of London, with a minority report favouring the granting of a charter to the Albert University. It was agreed that if reform of the existing University failed, the new university should be established.

A complicated scheme for reform of the university was drawn up in 1891 but was rejected by Convocation, leading to a renewal of the petition to form the Albert University. This was approved by the Privy Council later in 1891 and was (in accordance with an 1871 law) laid in the Houses of Parliament for comment, with the name now changed to the Gresham University after Gresham College joined the scheme. In response to opposition to the charter, a second Royal Commission was established in 1892.

The new commission recommended another attempt at reform of the University of London rather than establishment of a new body, and that this be carried out by Act of Parliament rather than by royal charter. This was accepted by Convocation in 1895 and passed Parliament (at the third attempt) in 1898. The University of London became a federal institute in 1900 under new statutes drawn up under this act, with King's becoming one of the schools of the university.

== 20th century ==
=== 1900–1939 ===
In 1902 the college launched an appeal for £500,000. The main aims of the appeal were to pay off the debt, to maintain the quality of labs and equipment, and to secure adequate pay for the professors. The Bishop of London read a message from the king at the launch of the appeal: "His Majesty is thoroughly in sympathy with the proposal to raise by subscription a large fund for the endowment of King's College as a constituent of the newly-developed University of London, and wishes the movement for that purpose all success." At the same time, the College Council voted in favour of removing religious restrictions, except within the Theological Department. The King's College London Act 1903 (3 Edw. 7. c. xcii) effected the abolition of the religious tests for staff, except within the Theological Department, bringing King's in line with Oxford, Cambridge and Durham, where religious tests had been similarly removed by the Universities Tests Act 1871 (again, with the exception of their theological staff). At this time, King's had 1,385 students, but only 324 were matriculated in the University of London to pursue degrees, the vast majority were either preparing for professional examinations or for entry to Oxford or Cambridge.

1908 saw the relocation of King's College Hospital from its original site on Portugal Street to its current location on Denmark Hill. This led to the separation of pre-clinical studies at the college and clinical studies at the hospital.

On 1 January 1910, the college followed UCL in being merged (with the exception of the Theological Department) into the University of London under the King's College London (Transfer) Act 1908 (8 Edw. 7. c. xxxix), losing its legal independence. The Theological Department continued under the control of the Council of King's College and, under the same act, became a school of the university. The Women's Department was incorporated as a distinct College from King's, under the name King's College for Women.

The merger gave the college a corporate say in the business of the university that the 1900 statutes did not give to the unincorporated schools. This and other defects in the university's governance led to the Haldane Commission of 1909–1913, but the outbreak of World War I in 1914 meant its recommendations were not implemented.

During World War I the Medical school was opened to women for the first time. 415 students from King's College and from Guy's and St Thomas' hospitals were killed in the war. Most of the departments of King's Culture for Women were incorporated back into King's in 1915, with the exception of the Household and Social Science Department.

The end of the war saw an influx of students, with numbers more than doubling from 1,775 in 1917–18 to 3,879 two years layer. This strained the existing facilities to the point where some classes were held in the Principal's house. A government proposal to relocate the premises of King's to Bloomsbury was considered, but finally rejected in 1925. Instead, the Strand campus was extended, including the acquisition of land above Aldwych underground station and the addition of a two-storey building atop the roof of the Main Building. It was suggested at this time that King's take over the east wing of the neighbouring Somerset House, occupied by government offices, but this was refused.

In 1928 the King's College for Women Household and Social Science Department became independent of the University of London as the King's College of Household and Social Science.

=== 1939–1980 ===
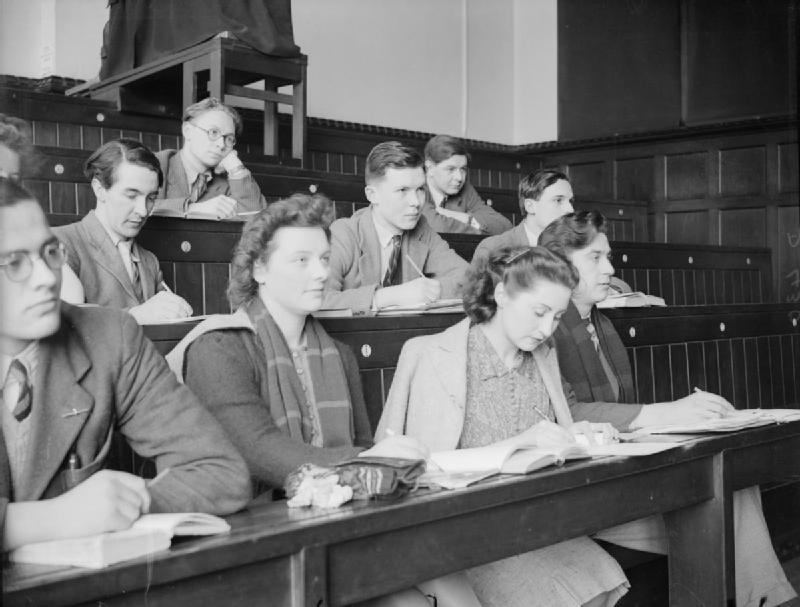
Evacuated King's College London students at the University of Bristol during the Second World War

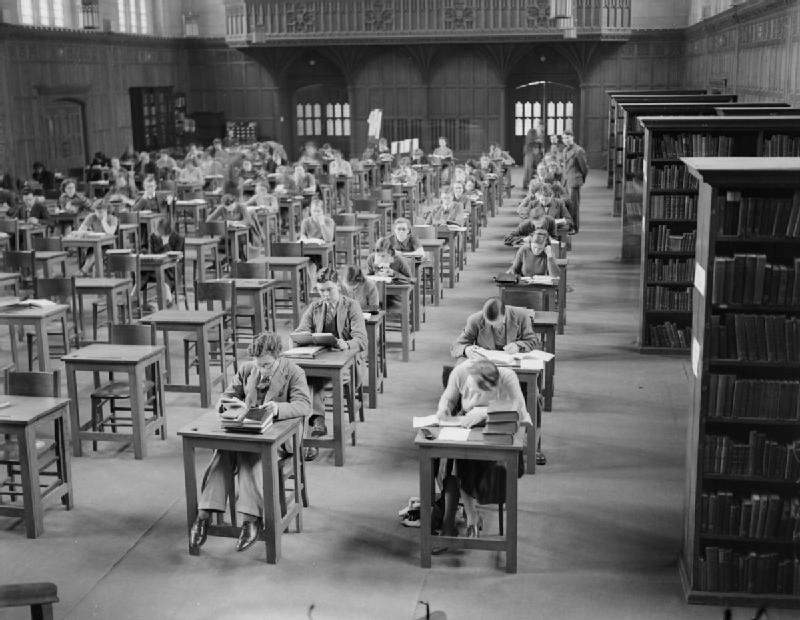
Evacuated King's College London students at the University of Bristol during the Second World War

During the Second World War most students and staff were evacuated out of London to Bristol and Glasgow. Students from King's College of Household and Social Science were evacuated first to Cardiff and then to Leicester. The buildings of King's College London were used by the Auxiliary Fire Service with a number of King's staff, mainly those then known as college servants, serving as firewatchers under the leadership of Robert Hutton, the college librarian. Parts of the Strand building, the quadrangle, and the roof of apse and stained glass windows of the chapel suffered bomb damage in the Blitz. During reconstruction, the vaults beneath the quadrangle were replaced by a two-storey laboratory, which opened in 1952, for the departments of Physics and Civil and Electrical Engineering.

In 1948 the creation of the National Health Service meant the separation of the Guy's, King's and St Thomas's Medical Schools from their respective hospitals. In 1953 the King's College of Household and Social Science received a royal charter under the name of Queen Elizabeth College and admitted men for the first time. In 1956 it was recognised as a school of the University of London.

After plans to move into the east wing of Somerset House were again rejected, the Strand Building was commissioned in 1954. Planning permission was granted in 1961 and the building was constructed in 1966–71. It is described by Historic England as "a modest and relatively undistinguished example of its type, relating awkwardly to its historic surroundings and embodying – in contrast with other, more ambitious post-war university buildings – no particular innovations in functionality or architectural design".

One of the most famous pieces of scientific research performed at King's were the crucial contributions to the discovery of the double helix structure of DNA in 1953 by Maurice Wilkins and Rosalind Franklin, together with Raymond Gosling, Alex Stokes, Herbert Wilson and other colleagues at the Randall Division of Cell and Molecular Biophysics at King's.

Major reconstruction of King's began in 1966 following the publication of the Robbins Report on Higher Education. The Strand Building, designed by E. D. Jefferiss Mathews, was opened in 1972. The Macadam Building was then built over 1972–75. Planning permission for further new buildings on the Strand campus, linking the Macadam Building to the Strand Building (Phase III) and the Strand Building to Somerset House (Phase IV), was refused following the listing of older buildings on the area and the designation, in 1974, of the Strand Conservation Area. Renewed efforts were made in the 1960s and 70s to acquire the east wing of Somerset House, but these were again unsuccessful.

=== 1980–1999 ===
In 1980 King's regained its legal independence under a new royal charter. In 1993 King's, along with other large University of London colleges, gained direct access to government funding (which had previously been through the university) and the right to confer University of London degrees itself. This contributed to King's and the other large colleges being regarded as de facto universities in their own right.

The college and associated institutes underwent several mergers in the late 20th century. In 1983 Guy's Hospital Medical School and St Thomas's Hospital Medical School re-merged (having previously been united until 1825) to form the United Medical and Dental Schools of Guy's and St Thomas' Hospitals. In the same year the King's College School of Medicine and Dentistry re-merged with King's College. In 1985 Queen Elizabeth College re-merged with King's, along with Chelsea College of Science and Technology. The Institute of Psychiatry joined King's in 1997, and in 1998 the United Medical and Dental Schools of Guy's and St Thomas' Hospitals merged with King's Medical School to form the GKT Medical School within King's College. Also in 1998, Florence Nightingale's original training school for nurses merged with the King's Department of Nursing Studies as the Florence Nightingale School of Nursing and Midwifery. The same year King's acquired the former Public Record Office building on Chancery Lane and converted it at a cost of £35 million into the Maughan Library, which opened in 2002.

== 21st century ==
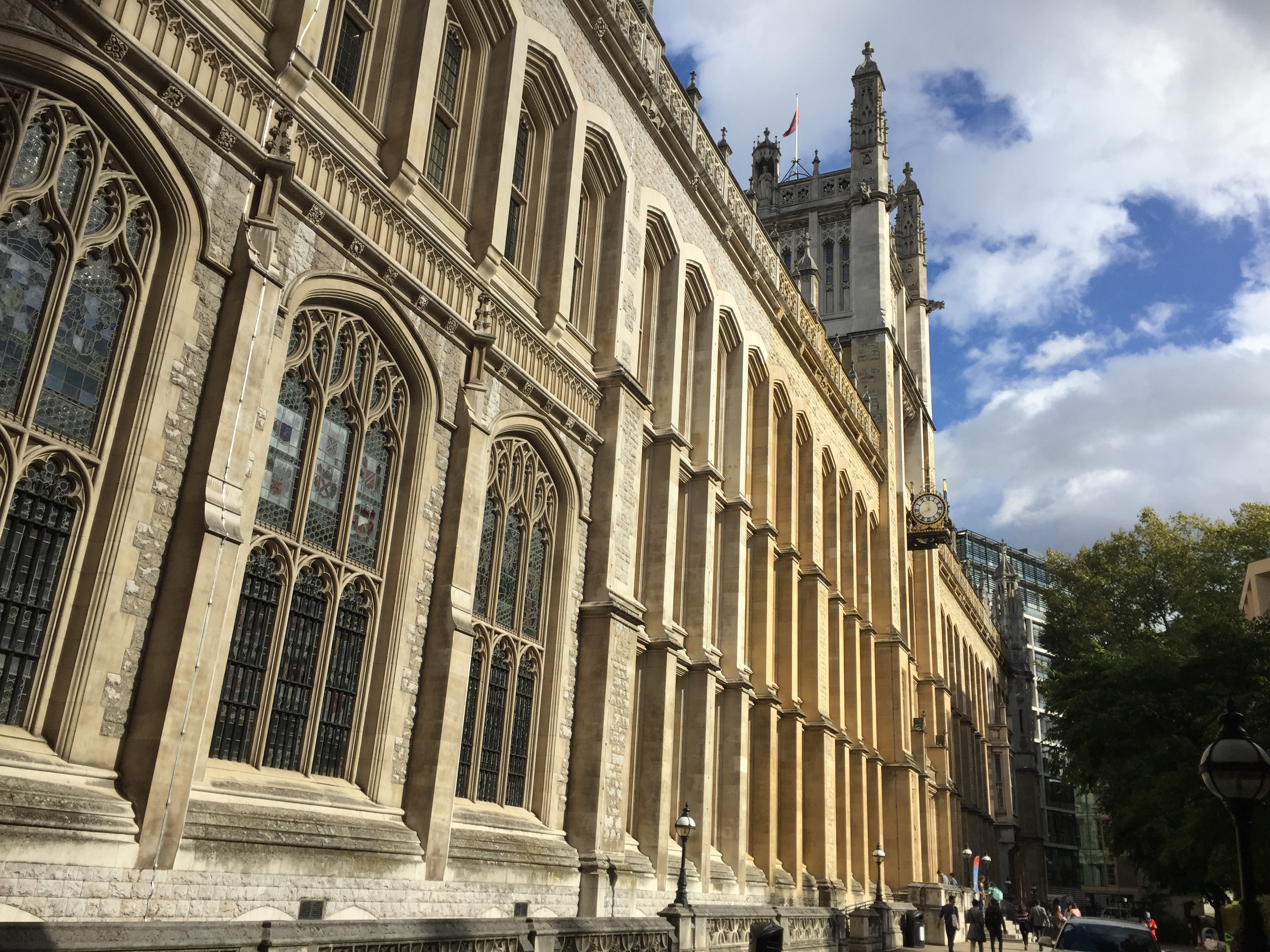
The Maughan Library. Following a £35m renovation, it is the largest new university library in the United Kingdom since World War II

In 2002 the Academic Board recommended to the College Council that King's apply for degree awarding powers, following the proposed merger of UCL and Imperial College. The application was delayed while the UK government reviewed the criteria but when the new criteria were published in 2004 the Board renewed its recommendation. In April 2005, King's formally applied for degree awarding powers. In the same year, the Academic Board recommended that King's begin using its delegated degree awarding powers from the University of London to award research degrees in addition to taught degrees, rather than having research degrees awarded centrally.

In July 2006, King's College London was granted degree-awarding powers in its own right, as opposed to through the University of London, by the Privy Council. This power remained unexercised until 2007, when King's announced that all students starting courses from September 2007 onwards would be awarded degrees conferred by King's itself, rather than by the University of London. The new certificates however still make reference to the fact that King's is a constituent college of the University of London. All current students with at least one year of study remaining were in August 2007 offered the option of choosing to be awarded a University of London degree or a King's degree. The first King's degrees were awarded in summer 2008.

In 2007, for the second consecutive year, students from the School of Law won the national round of the Philip C. Jessup International Law Moot Court Competition. The Jessup moot is the largest international mooting competition in the world. The King's team went on to represent the UK as national champions.

In 2009, King's finally gained one of its objectives since 1831 – it acquired the east wing of Somerset House. King's secured a 78-year lease for the building and launched a £20M fundraising drive to pay (along with a £7.5M grant from HEFCE) for its restoration. The refurbished East Wing was officially reopened by the Queen in 2012.

In 2010, King's announced that 205 jobs were put at risk in response to government funding cuts. Among the proposed cuts was the UK's only chair of palaeography, two leading computational linguists, and the department of Engineering, believed to be the oldest in the UK (established in 1838), sparking an international campaign from academics.

In November 2010, King's launched a fundraising campaign to raise £500 million by 2015 for research into five areas: cancer, global power, neuroscience and mental health, leadership and society and children's health. Over £400 million has been raised as of March 2013. In 2011 the Chemistry department was reopened following its closure in 2003.

In April 2011, King's became a founding partner in the UK Centre for Medical Research and Innovation, subsequently renamed the Francis Crick Institute, committing £40 million to the project.

In June 2014, King's announced plans for large-scale redundancies, potentially affecting up to 15% of staff in biomedical sciences and at the Institute of Psychiatry. Commentators noted that many senior academics as well as students were highly critical of the plans, on the grounds that they were being rushed through without adequate consultation, threatened to leave students without adequate teaching staff, and would weaken the research capacity and damage the reputation of the university. A spokesperson for King's argued that the numbers of planned redundancies were fewer than critics claimed, but in so doing came in for further criticism, because staff had not been told of this information. It was subsequently noted that the redundancy plan also went against explicit advice in a commissioned report on the university's finances. Around the same time as these developments, an article in the Times Higher Education noted that, in an apparently unrelated development, King's was contesting a freedom of information request for details of salaries of its top professors.

In October 2014, Ed Byrne replaced Rick Trainor as Principal of King's College London, the latter having served for 10 years. In December 2014, King's announced its plans to rebrand its name to 'King's London'. It was emphasised that there were no plans to change the legal name of King's, and that the name 'King's London' was designed to promote King's and to highlight the fact that King's is a university in its own right. King's announced that the rebranding plans had been dropped in January 2015.

On 10 March 2015, King's acquired a 50-year lease for the Aldwych Quarter which includes the historic grand Bush House building. King's will occupy Bush House and Strand House on a phased basis from September 2016, and adjacent buildings King House and Melbourne House from 2025. Once King's takes full occupation of the four main buildings, the Aldwych Quarter will provide approximately 300,000 square feet of additional space for student study and social space, new teaching facilities and academic accommodation

== Historical estate ==
The estate of King's College London, particularly the Strand Campus, includes a number of historic buildings, many listed at various grades. These include the main King's Building, constructed in 1828 to complete the riverside frontage of Somerset House, and the current east wing of Somerset House (both Grade I listed), the Maughan Library (Grade II* listed), 152 and 153 Strand (Grade II listed), and Bush House (Grade II listed). The Strand Campus mostly falls within the Strand Conservation Area, with the Strand Building and Macadam Building having been granted certificates of immunity. The Maughan Library falls within the Chancery Lane Conservation Area.
