= Coat of arms of the London Borough of Bexley =

Coat of arms

Coat of arms of the London Borough of Bexley is the official coat of arms of the London Borough of Bexley, granted on 20 May 1965.

== Design ==
The arms have wavy lines representing the rivers Thames, Cray and Shuttle, on which Bexley is situated. The gold fields at top with the oak tree and bottom with the cog wheel represent the agricultural and mineral wealth of the Borough. The oak tree was taken from the arms of the former Bexley council, and also signified the rural nature of much of the council's area. The red saltire has no official meaning, but it can be noted that there is also a red saltire in the arms of the Diocese of Rochester, to which the majority of Bexley belongs.

The horse in the crest is the white horse of Kent, a traditional symbol of the county. This horse was also present in the crest of the former Municipal Borough of Bexley and the arms of the Crayford UDC. Standing on a gateway, the horse symbolises the borough's location in the historic county of Kent.

The supporters are red stags, from the arms of Lord Eardley of Belvedere House. A stag like this was part of the crest of the former Municipal Borough of Erith. The stags are gorged with silver and blue waves from the shield in the Bexley arms to differentiate them.

== Motto ==
The motto is a translation of the Latin motto 'FORTITER ET RECTE', which is the motto of Crayford

== Blazon ==
ARMS: Per saltire Or and barry wavy of six Argent and Azure a Saltire Gules between in chief an Oak Tree eradicated proper fructed Or and in base a Cog Wheel Gules. CREST: On a Wreath Or and Gules on the Battlements of a Port between two Towers Argent masoned Sable a Horse forcene Argent. SUPPORTERS: On either side a Stag Gules attired and unguled Or gorged with a Collar wavy Argent thereon a Bar wavy Azure. Motto 'BOLDLY AND RIGHTLY'.

== See also ==
- Armorial of London
