= Coat of arms of the London Borough of Ealing =

Coat of arms

Coat of arms of Ealing

The coat of arms of the London Borough of Ealing is the official heraldic arms of the London Borough of Ealing, England, granted on 1 September 1965.

The main charge of the shield is an oak tree, a type of tree which was also present in the coat of arms of both the Municipal Borough of Ealing and the Municipal Borough of Acton; in the later, it was a canting charge, since Acton is considered to mean "oaktown", and it may also have a canting meaning for Norwood Green (North Wood) and Southall (South Holt). The oak tree is fructed, which means it is depicted with its fruits, i.e. acorns. There are twenty acorns, something which is not stated in the blazon but upheld in tradition because they stand for the original twenty wards in the present borough. The tree is growing from a grassy base as in the former coat of arms of Acton and is set against a silver field like in the former coat of arms of Ealing. Like in the former coat of arms of Acton, there is a chief in the shield, and here it is red with three golden Saxon crowns, representing the three former Middlesex boroughs and the county, which was symbolised in a similar way also in the now obsolete coat of arms of the Greater London Council.

Unlike many other London Boroughs, the coat of arms of the London Borough of Ealing consists only of a shield and a motto, and have no helmet, crest or supporters.

== Blazon ==
Arms: Argent issuant from a Grassy Mount in base an Oak Tree proper fructed Or on a Chief Gules three Saxon Crowns Or. Motto: 'PROGRESS WITH UNITY'.

== See also ==
- Armorial of London
