= Coat of arms of the London Borough of Bromley =

- Armiger: London Borough of Bromley
- Adopted: 1965
- Crest: On a Wreath of the Colours two Swords in saltire Gules ensigned by an Escallop Or.
- Shield: Vert a pierced Cinquefoil Argent within an orle of Acorns Or.
- Supporters: On the dexter side a Dragon and on the sinister side a Horse both Argent.
- Motto: Latin: *SERVIRE POPULO* (To serve the people)

The coat of arms of the London Borough of Bromley is the official coat of arms of the London Borough of Bromley, granted on 20 April 1965.

This London Borough was created by merging five earlier entities, the Municipal Borough of Beckenham, the Municipal Borough of Bromley, the Orpington Urban District, the Penge Urban District and a part of the Chislehurst and Sidcup Urban District. Some of these had arms. Instead of combining the older arms to a new, probably more complex design, it was decided to create all new arms for Bromley to allow for a simpler design.

The pierced silver cinquefoil in the shield alludes to the five earlier authorities with its five petals, while the green field stands for this relatively wooded and rural part of London. There are different interpretations of the acorns surrounding the cinquefoil, they may refer to the characteristic Kentish oaks, and also represent the seed of the new London Borough, but may also stand for the many semi-rural villages in the area.

The crest has crossed swords for the many military establishments within Bromley's boundaries and a scallop, which also was present in the crest in the arms of the old Municipal Borough of Bromley and comes from the arms of the Diocese of Rochester, owner of the manor of Bromley from the reign of King Ethelbert.

The supporters are a silver dragon, similar to the dragon supporters in the coat of arms of the City of London, since Bromley is now part of Greater London, and the white horse of Kent (depicted in silver since this is heraldic arms) from the coat of arms of the Kent County Council, for the county in which the London Borough was formerly situated.

== See also ==
- Armorial of London
