= Coat of arms of King's College London =

- Armiger: King's College London
- Adopted: 1829 Original Coat of Arms of George IV; 1989 Current Arms
- Crest: On a Helm with a Wreath Or and Azure Upon a Book proper rising from a Coronet Or the rim set with jewels two Azure (one manifest) four Vert (two manifest) and two Gules a demi Lion Gules holding a Rod of Aesculapius
- Shield: Or on a Pale Azure between two Lions rampant respectant Gules an Anchor Gold ensigned by a Royal Crown proper on a Chief Argent an Ancient Lamp proper inflamed Gold between two Blazing Hearths
- Motto: Sancte et sapienter (Holiness and Wisdom)

The coat of arms of King's College London in London, England, are blazoned: on a Pale Azure between two Lions rampant respectant Gules an Anchor Gold ensigned by a Royal Crown proper on a Chief Argent an Ancient Lamp proper inflamed Gold between two Blazing Hearths also proper.

The current coat of arms was developed after the mergers of the college with Queen Elizabeth College and Chelsea College of Science and Technology, University of London in 1985; coming into use in 1989. The arms incorporate aspects of the heraldry of the three colleges. The rampant lions may reference both the historic King's arms and those of Chelsea, the blazing hearths are from those of Queen Elizabeth College, the royal crown from King's. A warrant for the use of the current arms was granted by the College of Arms, and the right to use the royal crown in the armorial achievement was granted by Queen Elizabeth II in 1995.

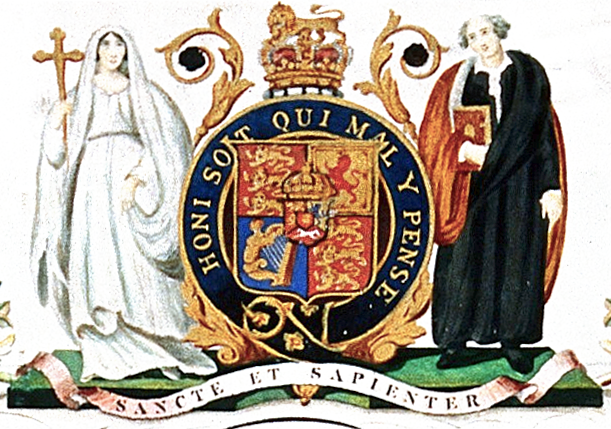
Arms used by King's College from 1829 to 1989

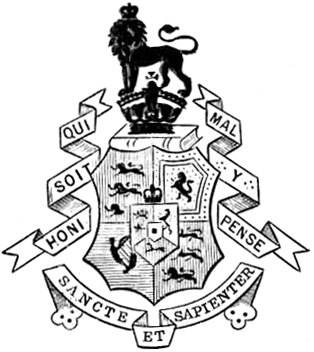
Arms of King's College, used sometime in 1911

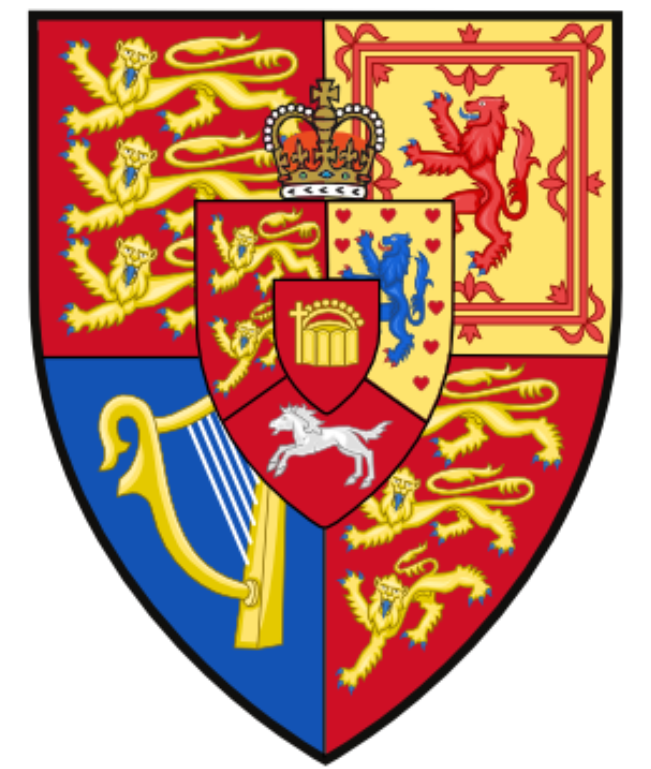
Escutcheon only, of George IV's arms, as used by King's College prior to 1989

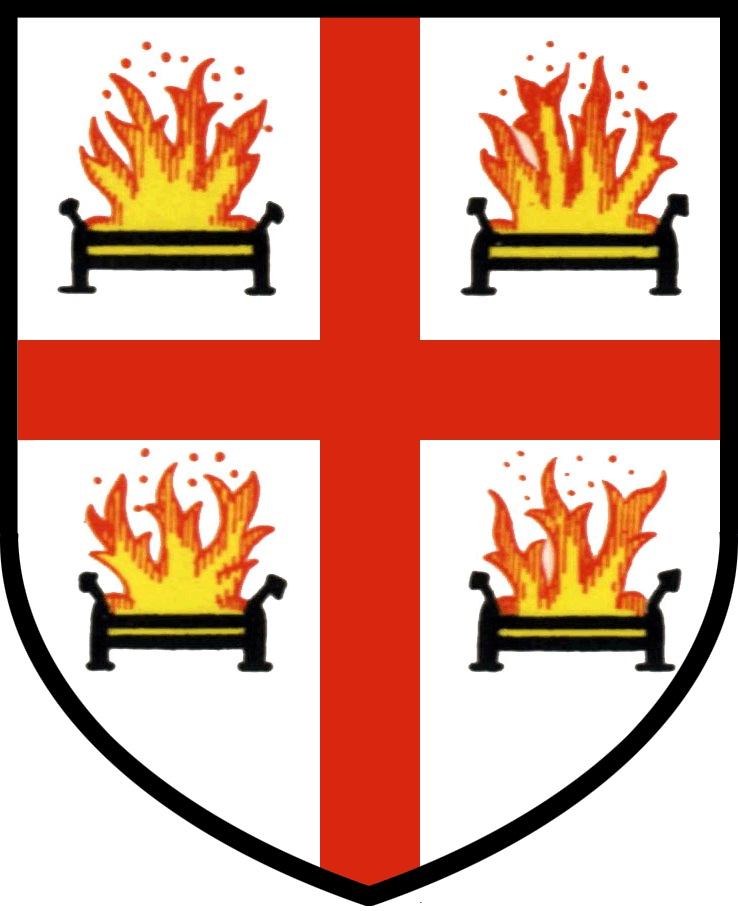
Arms of Queen Elizabeth College which merged with King's College 1985

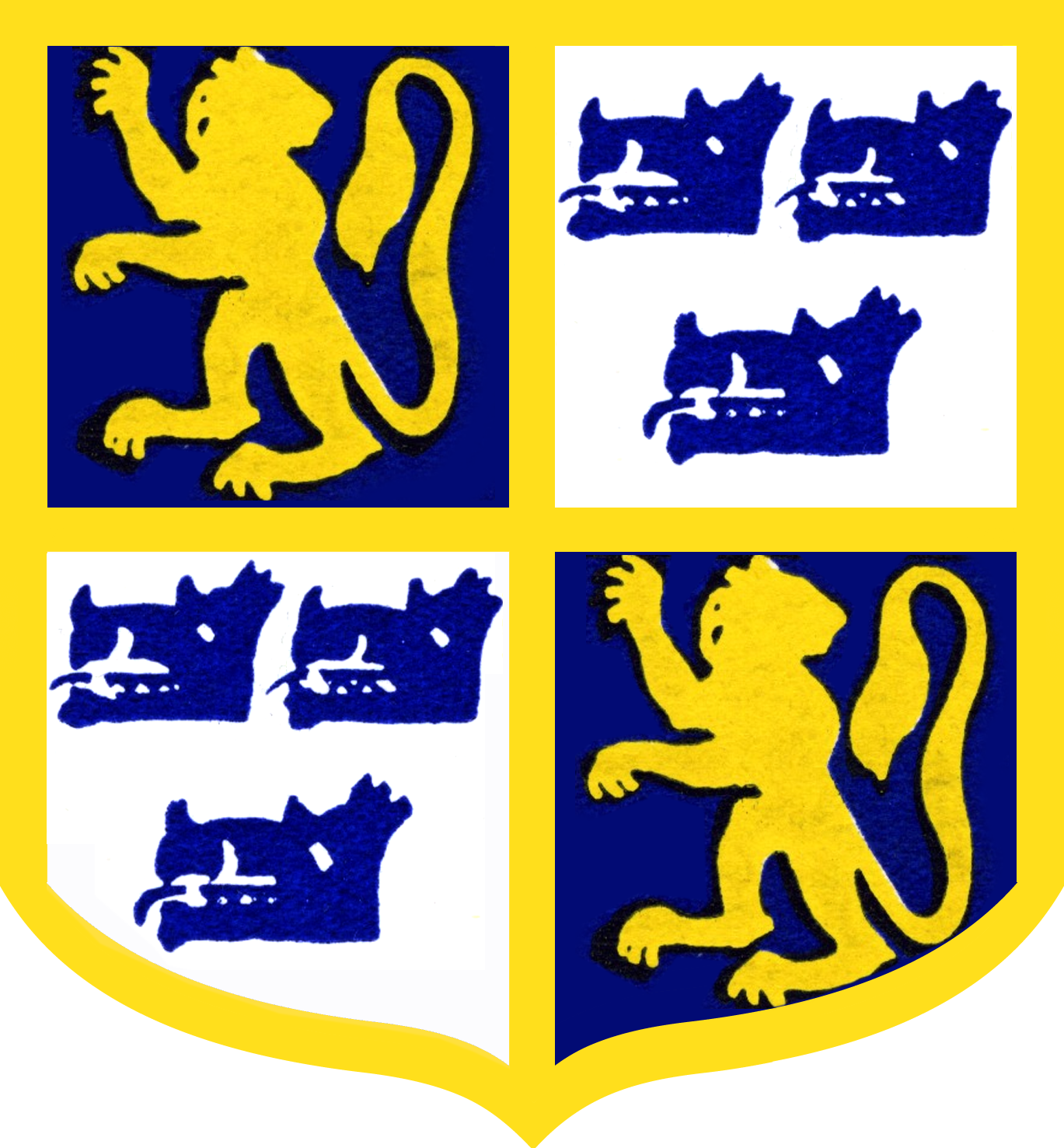
Arms of Chelsea College which merged with King's College 1985

Escutcheon only, of current arms

== Symbols ==
Crest:

Book - represents learning.

Coronet - a royal connection to the college at foundation.

Red lion - carryover from the historic royal arms, in a different format. The red lion was adopted in 1923 as the KCL student mascot.

Rod of Aesculapius - traditional symbol of medicine, referencing King's College Hospital and medical education.

Escutcheon:

Rampant lions - referencing the historic arms of KCL and possibly Chelsea College, although the latter's lions are 'reguardant' ie looking backwards.

Ancient lamp - a traditional symbol of enlightenment ie education.

Burning hearths - taken from Queen Elizabeth College's arms, referencing the latter's origins as a 'college of household and social science'.

Royal Crown - usage permitted by royal consent in 1995, linking to the college's early royal patronage.

Anchor - symbolism is unknown; KCL's website and other sources make no mention.

== Historic coat of arms ==
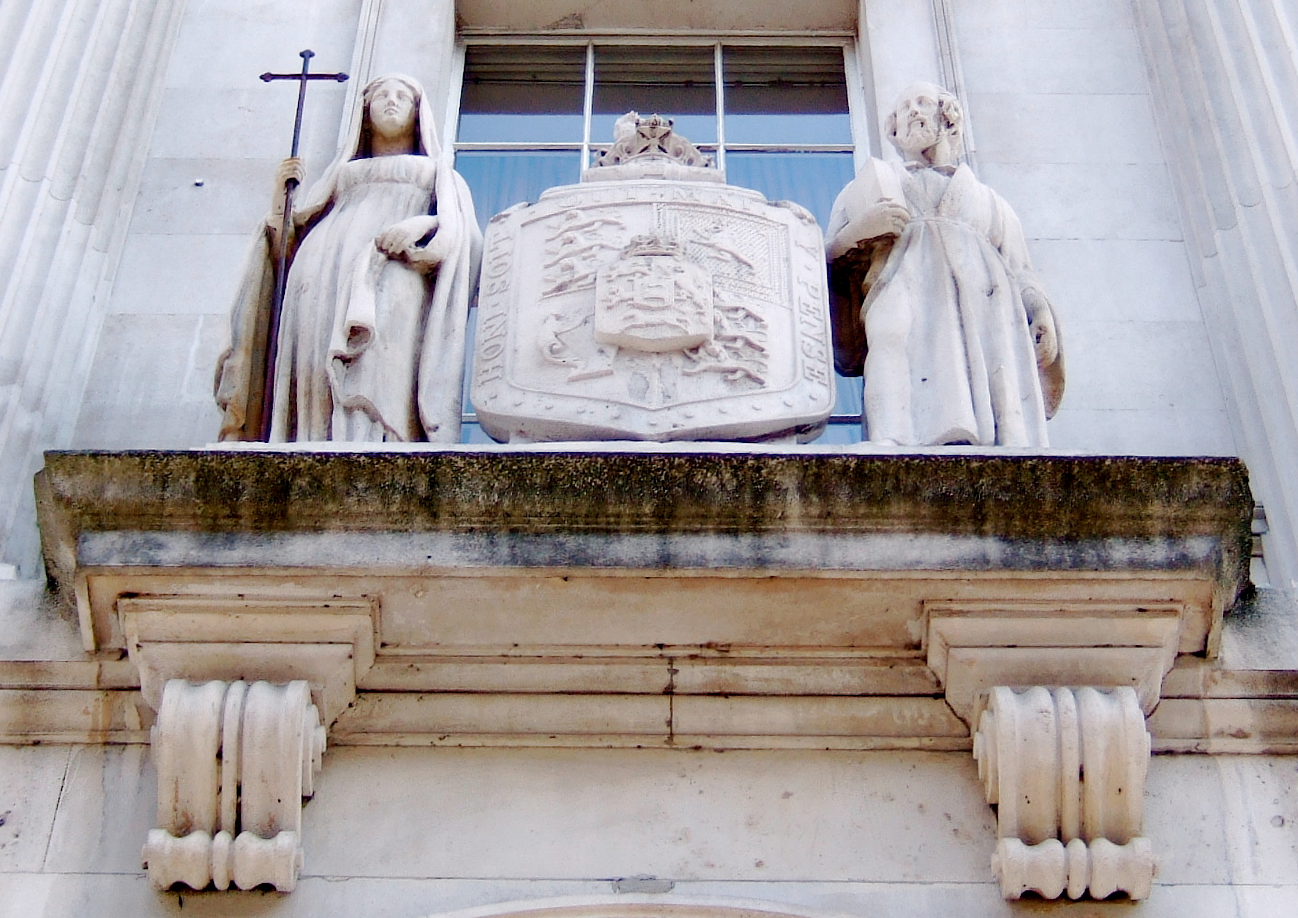
The original arms displayed on the entrance of the King's Building

The original coat of arms used from 1829 to 1989 is that of George IV, who was the King at the time of foundation of the college. The shield depicts the royal coat of arms together with an inescutcheon of the House of Hanover, while the supporters embody the college motto of sancte et sapienter ("With Holiness and Wisdom"). The original arms are displayed on the 1829 Royal Charter of King's College London.

The supporters, which reference the college's motto 'Sancte et Sapienter' (With Holiness and Wisdom) are blazoned: Dexter a female figure habited Azure the cloak lined coif and sleeves Argent holding in the exterior hand a Lond Cross botony Gold and Sinister a male figure the Long Coat Azure trimmed with Sable proper shirt Argent holding in the interior hand a Book proper.

There is no surviving correspondence in the King's College London Archives and at the College of Arms regarding the choice of the original coat of arms. A wide variety of unofficial adaptations have been used during the college history. The original arms can still be seen at the entrance to the 19th century King's Building at the Strand Campus.

== Usage ==
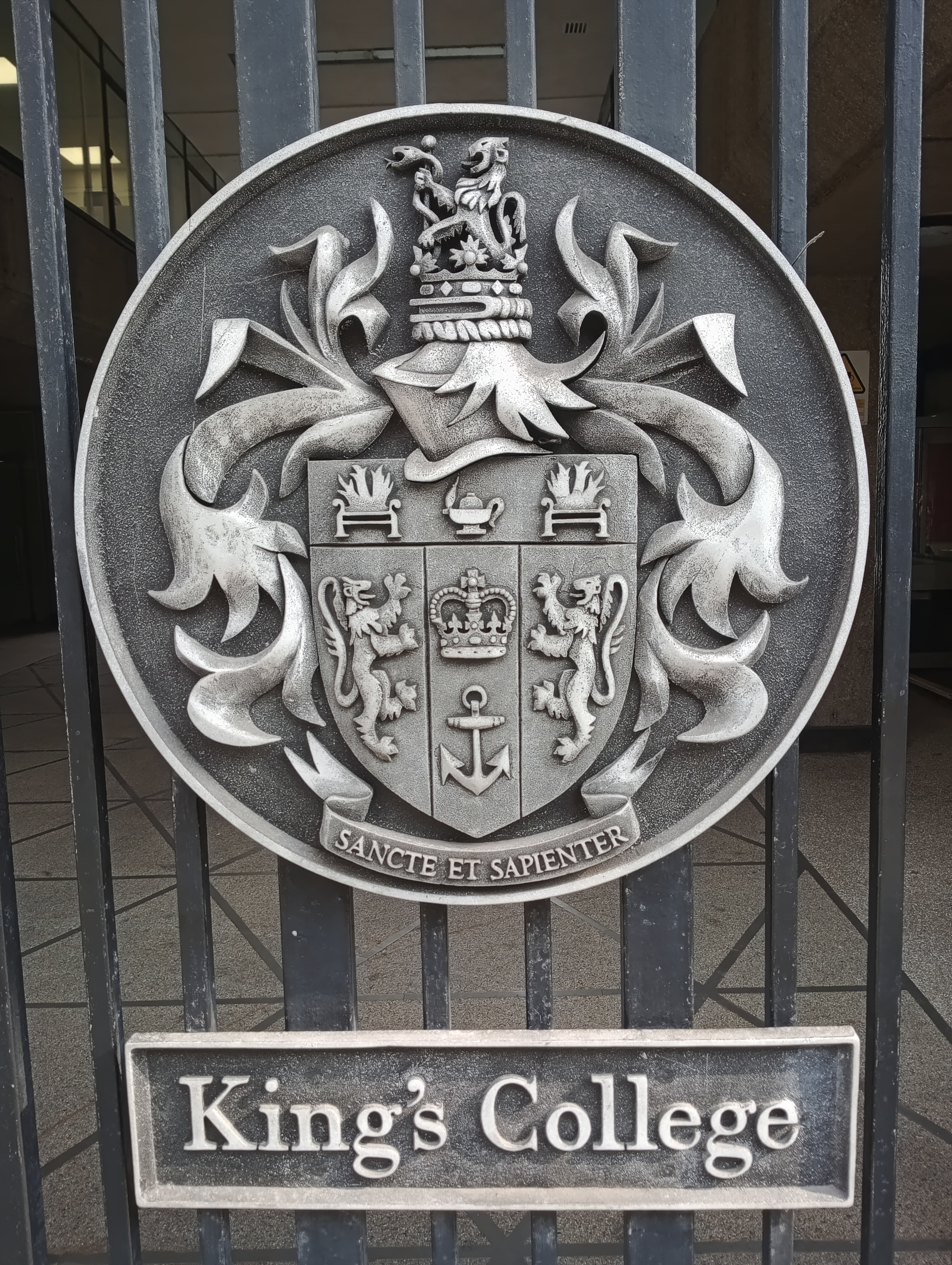
The current arms displayed on the main gates of King's College London

The King's College London coat of arms is used on formal documents, including examination certificates, formal invitations and graduation materials, and it acts as a legitimising device on official legal titles and documents. Although not the college's prime brand identifier the coat of arms is found on the college gates, merchandise, and used by student societies.. The university also specifically endorses use of the KCL escutcheon to represent King's College Hospital alongside those of Guy's Hospital and St Thomas' Hospital, the teaching hospitals being the three components of King's College London GKT School of Medical Education.

== See also ==
- Armorial of UK universities
- King's College London
- History of King's College London
