= Coat of arms of the London Borough of Camden =

- Armiger: London Borough of Camden
- Adopted: 1965
- Crest: On a Wreath of the Colours issuant from a Mural Crown Argent a demi Elephant Sable armed Or about the neck a Wreath of Holly fructed proper.
- Shield: Argent on a Cross Gules a Mitre Or a Chief Sable thereon three Escallops Argent.
- Supporters: On the dexter side a Lion and on the sinister side a Eagle Or each gorged with a Collar the dexter Argent charged with three Mullets Sable the sinister Gules charged with three Mullets Or and pendent from the collar of each a Fountain.
- Compartment: A grassy mound vert
- Motto: Latin: *NON SIBI SED TOTI* (Not for self but for all)

Arms of the London Borough of Camden: Argent, on a cross gules a mitre or on a chief sable three escallops of the first

The coat of arms of the London Borough of Camden were granted on 10 September 1965. The borough was formed by the merger of three former boroughs, namely the Metropolitan Borough of Hampstead, the Metropolitan Borough of Holborn and the Metropolitan Borough of St. Pancras, from whose arms elements were utilised in the arms of the new borough.

== Arms ==
The arms of the London Borough of Camden are blazoned: Argent, on a cross gules a mitre or on a chief sable three escallops of the first. The red cross on a silver field is the Cross of St. George, which was present in the coat of arms of Holborn and represents the patron saint of two parish churches therein, namely St George the Martyr, Holborn and St George's, Bloomsbury. The gold mitre, like that in the coat of arms of Hampstead, refers to Westminster Abbey which held the manor of Hampstead for six centuries until 1539. The black chief with three silver escallops is from the coat of arms of Holborn and escallops were also present in the arms of St. Pancras; the chief and escallops are ultimately derived from the arms of the Russell family, Dukes of Bedford, which owns the Bedford Estate, a large estate in Bloomsbury and surroundings, now much reduced in size.

== Crest ==
The crest is: On a wreath of the colours issuant from a mural crown argent a demi-elephant sable armed or about the neck a wreath of holly fructed proper. The mural crown is a common heraldic symbol for local municipal authorities and in these arms it is also a reminder that Camden is adjacent to the old city wall of the City of London. The elephant is taken from the arms of the Pratt family, as Camden Town is named after Charles Pratt, 1st Earl Camden (1713–1794), father of John Pratt, 1st Marquess Camden (1759–1840). An elephant is also present in the coat of arms of St. Pancras, but the wreath of holly around its neck in the crest of the Borough of Camden is taken from the coat of arms of Hampstead, itself taken from the seal of the vestry in Hampstead.

== Supporters ==
The supporters are: On the dexter side a lion and on the sinister side a eagle or each gorged with a collar the dexter argent charged with three mullets sable the sinister gules charged with three mullets or and pendent from the collar of each a fountain. They are derived from the arms of Lincoln's Inn and Gray's Inn, both situated in the Borough; the lion is from the arms of the De Lacy family, Earls of Lincoln, whose London town house was Lincoln's Inn, while the griffin stands for Gray's Inn, formerly the town house of the Gray family. The supporters are both differenced by a collar bearing three mullets and from which hangs an heraldic fountain (which should be depicted proper, that is in the usual silver and blue since no other tinctures are specified for them in the blazon). The three mullets on each collar symbolise the three boroughs merged to form Camden while their total number, six, represent the number of old parishes in Camden. The fountains reflect the name of Holborn, originally the "old bourne" (stream) or may possibly represent the canals and waterways of the borough.

== Motto ==
The motto, NON SIBI SED TOTI, is Latin for 'not for self but for all' and was previously used by Holborn.

== Badge ==
The badge is blazoned: On a roundel tierced in pairle reversed gules azure and sable fimbriated or an elephant's head erased argent armed or.

== See also ==
- Armorial of London
