= Coat of arms of the London Borough of Brent =

- Armiger: London Borough of Brent
- Adopted: 1 September 1965
- Crest: Within a Saxon Crown Or on a Mount Vert a Lion statant guardant Or charged on the shoulder with a Cinquefoil Gules.
- Shield: Per chevron Gules and Vert a Chevron wavy Argent between in dexter chief an Orb ensigned with a Cross crosslet Or and in sinister chief two Swords in saltire proper Pommels and Hilts Or points upwards and in base two Seaxes in saltire proper Pommels and Hilts Or enfiled with a Saxon Crown Or.
- Supporters: On the dexter side a Lion Or supporting a Staff Gules with a Banner Vert charged with a Balance Or on the sinister side a Dragon Azure supporting a Staff Vert with a Banner Gules charged with three Lilies Argent Mantled Gules doubled Argent the whole upon a Grassy Mound divided by Water Argent charged with a Pale wavy Azure.
- Motto: 'FORWARD TOGETHER'.

The Coat of arms of the London Borough of Brent is the official arms of the London Borough of Brent. It was granted on 1 September 1965.

== Design ==
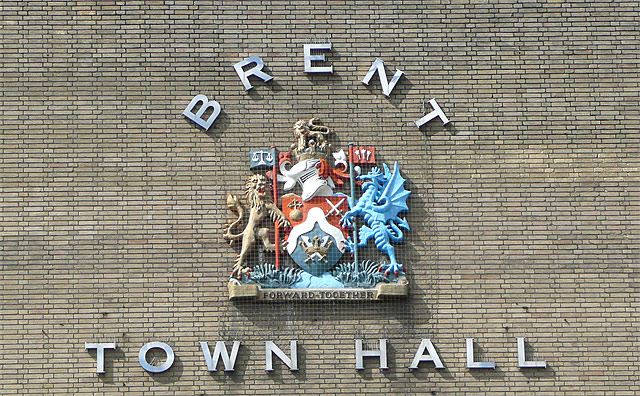
Coat of arms of Brent in relief on the former Brent Town Hall

The red field on the shield is from the arms of the Municipal Borough of Willesden, the green field is from those of Municipal Borough of Wembley. They are divided by a wavy chevron, standing for the River Brent, which divided the two but now unites them and has given the borough its name. The orb and the crossed swords are from the arms of Willesden; the orb represents King Athelstan, who granted the Manors of Neasden-cum-Willesden to the Monastery of St. Arkenwold in the 10th century, while the swords represent the Dean and Chapter of St. Paul's, who were the owners of the Manor of Willesden at the time of Domesday. The crossed seaxes and Saxon crown in the lower field, corresponding to the old arms of Wembley, are derived from the arms of the Middlesex County Council.

The crest was combined of those of the two merged Boroughs. The gold lion in the Saxon Crown is the lion of England, which also was present in the arms of Wembley, and it is charged with a red cinquefoil, from the arms of Willesden, ultimately from the arms of All Souls College, Oxford, which owns land in the area.

The supporters are also taken one from each of the arms of the former Boroughs, the lion from Wembley and the dragon from Willesden. The gold lion comes from the arms of John Lyon, founder of a trust for the maintenance of Harrow and Edgware Roads, which partly lie within the Borough. The green flag held by the lion bears gold scales, which indicate that the Hundred Moot (court of law) of Gore was held at Wembley. The Willesden arms were supported by two blue dragons. The remaining one of these holds a red flag with three silver lilies, the emblem of St. Mary, the patron saint of Willesden. The compartment has a stylised river, again a reference to the River Brent.

== Former arms ==
Coat of Arms of the Municipal Borough of Willesden

Coat of Arms Municipal Borough of Wembley

== See also ==
- Armorial of London
