= White horse of Kent =

Symbol of Kent, England

White horse of Kent on the coat of arms of Kent

The white horse of Kent, known colloquially as the white horse rampant, is a symbol of the county of Kent, in south-east England. The heraldic image is correctly blazoned as Gules, a stallion forcené argent (strictly the term rampant applies to heraldic lions).

The figure of the prancing white horse can also be referred to as Invicta, which is the motto of Kent.

== Origin ==
The white horse of Kent is the old symbol for the Jutish Kingdom of Kent, dating from the 6th–8th century. The white horse relates to the emblem of Horsa, the brother of Hengest, who according to legend defeated the King Vortigern near Aylesford. Other sources point to the existence of pre-Roman coins from the area depicting the horse. The first recorded reference to the white horse can be found in Restitution of Decayed Antiquities from 1605 by Richard Verstegan. The book shows an engraving of Hengist and Horsa landing in Kent in 449 under the banner of a rampant white horse.

The Saxon Steed on the flag of the Electorate of Hanover (1692).

Historian James Lloyd equates the White Horse of Kent with the Saxon Steed, a continental emblem, though suggesting the two symbols derive from a common root rather than the one from the other. The continental emblem can be found from the coat of arms of Lower Saxony, the Dutch region of Twente, and the House of Welf, who adapted it in the late 14th century. Lloyd confirms the existence of a Celtic horse cult in pre-Roman Kent; and points out that the Saxon emblem of the brother's time was the dragon, and that Kent was a Jutish, rather than a Saxon kingdom. He further suggests the Saxon Steed motif was invented in the 14th century "as a faux ancient symbol for the Saxons", being derived from an account by Gobelinus of the myth of Hengist and Horsa in Britain, thus tracing both emblems independently to the same source.

== Usage ==
The horse is a key part of the official coat of arms of the county. The animal appears on the coat of arms of many of the boroughs of Kent, and London boroughs historically part of Kent, like in the coat of arms of the London Borough of Bexley and the coat of arms of the London Borough of Bromley. and on the University of Kent coat of arms. The horse is depicted on the flag of Kent and forms part of the modern logos of Kent County Council, the Kent Fire and Rescue Service and the Kent Police. The horse is also depicted on the badges of Kent County Cricket Club, Gillingham F.C., Welling United F.C., Bromley F.C. and Folkestone Invicta F.C.

The horse also features on the logos of many companies and sports teams in Kent. It was used on the former Invictaway London commuter coaches operated by Maidstone & District Motor Services. A large number of pubs in the county also feature White Horse in their name. However, the name also occurs around the United Kingdom and may not necessarily relate to the Kent horse.

Arms of the London Borough of Bexley

Arms of the London Borough of Bromley

Arms of Kent County Council

== See also ==
- Folkestone White Horse, a hill figure in Kent
- White Horse Stone, megaliths near Aylesford, Kent
- The White Horse at Ebbsfleet, a planned colossal white horse statue sculpture in Ebbsfleet, Kent
- List of fictional horses
