= Coat of arms of the Royal Borough of Greenwich =

- Armiger: London Borough of Greenwich
- Adopted: 2012
- Crest: Upon a helm with a wreath argent and azure on waves barry wavy of four argent and azure a foul anchor or charged with a Tudor rose barbed and seeded proper.
- Shield: Gules a cannon barrel erect palewise proper surmounted by a lion's face or between two hour glasses or a chief nebuly of one point upwards azure thereon a chief nebuly of one point upwards argent charged with two mullets azure.
- Supporters: On the dexter a representation of Zeus proper vested gules murally crowned and holding in the dexter hand a Hartmann astrolabe or and on the sinister a representation of Neptune proper vested azure crowned with a naval crown & holding in the sinister hand a trident or.
- Motto: We Govern By Serving
- Earlier version
- Use: The coat of arms used between 1965 and 2012, with the following blazon: Per chevron Argent and Gules in chief an Hour Glass proper between two Estoiles Azure and in base three Cannon Barrels erect palewise proper each surmounted on the breech by a Lion's Face Or.

The coat of arms of the Royal Borough of Greenwich is the official heraldic arms of the Royal Borough of Greenwich. Arms were originally granted to this London borough in 1965 but these were replaced in 2012 with a new grant when the borough gained the epithet of "Royal Borough".

== Original arms ==
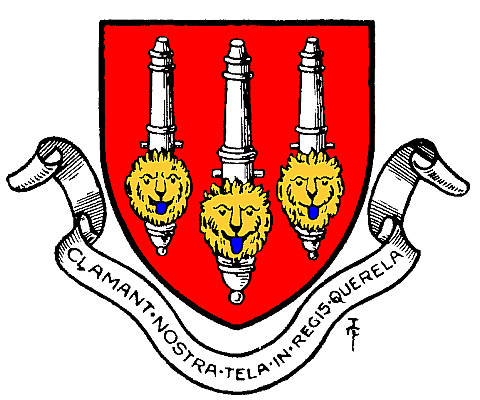
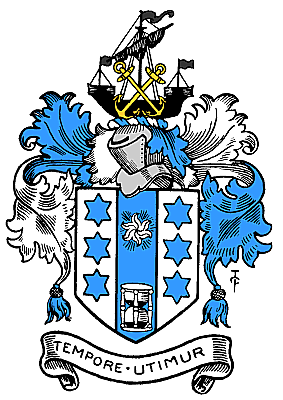
Coats of arms of Metropolitan Boroughs of Woolwich (top) and Greenwich (bottom)

Arms were originally granted to the London Borough by letters patent dated 1 October 1965. The hour glass and stars were taken from the arms of the Metropolitan Borough of Greenwich and symbolise the position of the borough as the place from which the standard of time is taken. The three cannon barrels, taken from the arms of the Metropolitan Borough of Woolwich, signify the association of that borough with the Royal Arsenal. These are also the origin of the cannon in the crest of Arsenal F.C.

== 2012 grant ==
New arms were granted to replace to borough on 3 January 2012, as it was decided the borough was to become a royal borough that year. Originally, the intention was that the borough would receive the royal epithet on 3 January, but this was postponed by one month to 3 February.

Although much of the 1965 design has been retained, the arms have been altered by the addition of a representation of the Thames. The two six-pointed radiated stars from the old arms were replaced by two five-pointed mullets, one hour glass became two and instead of three cannon barrels with a lion's head on each, there is now only one. In addition a crest and supporters were added to the arms: the crest comprises a Tudor Rose and a fouled anchor for royal and maritime connections. The supporters are two Roman gods: Jupiter (in Greek called Zeus, a name also used in the blazon) and Neptune (in Greek called Poseidon, but here the blazon uses the English cognate of the Latin name). According to the homepage of the borough, the supporters wear a mural crown and a naval crown respectively to represent the borough's historic associations with the British Army and Royal Navy; normally, a mural crown is used in heraldry to represent the civil municipal authority of a town or city and is not connected to the military at all. Jupiter is holding an astrolab of a kind constructed by Georg Hartmann, clearly a symbol for the astronomical studies at the Royal Observatory in Greenwich, while Neptune is holding his usual attribute of a trident.

The helmet is facing forwards, something which usually is reserved for royal arms. Special dispensation has been given to the royal borough for this use. The same is true for the Tudor rose in the crest, which also is marking the borough's long association with royalty.

The motto, 'We govern by serving', has been retained from the old arms.

== Meaning ==
The symbols relate to the Royal Observatory, built in 1675 for the advancement of navigation and nautical astronomy.

The ship and anchor on the crest recall the close association with the Royal Navy since the old royal palace was converted to a seamen's hospital, now the Old Royal Naval College.

== See also ==
- Armorial of London
