= Randall Division of Cell and Molecular Biophysics =

English research institute

Coordinates: 51.50320°N 0.08837°W

- Founder: Sir John Randall
- Location: New Hunt's House, Guy’s Campus, King's College London, London, England

The Randall Division of Cell and Molecular Biophysics (the Randall) is a research institute of King's College London located in London United Kingdom. It is a centre for study in allergy and asthma; muscle signalling and development; structural biology; muscle biophysics; cell motility and cytoskeleton, and cell imaging.

The Randall continues the tradition of Biophysics at King's established by Sir John Randall, which produced the studies of the structure of DNA by Rosalind Franklin and Maurice Wilkins. Much of this early work was supported by the Medical Research Council, who still provide the majority of research funding.

The Biophysics Unit expanded and in the 1960s moved to the site in Drury Lane that later became known as the Randall Institute, incorporating at various stages the King's Biophysics Department, MRC Cell Biophysics Unit, and MRC Muscle and Motility Unit. After King's merged with the Guy's and St Thomas’ Medical Schools in 1998, the Randall Institute research groups moved to new labs on the Guy's Campus at London Bridge, which became the present Randall Division of Cell and Molecular Biophysics.
