= Metropolitan Borough of St Pancras =

Metropolitan borough of England

Coordinates: 51°32′N 0°8′W

St Pancras
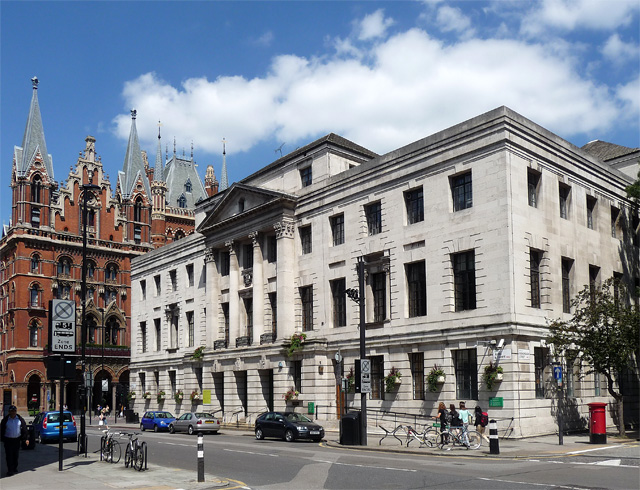
- St Pancras Town Hall

- St Pancras within the County of London
- Population
  - 1801: 31,779
  - 1961: 124,855
- History
  - Abolished: 1965
  - Succeeded by: London Borough of Camden
- Status: Civil parish (1937-1965); Metropolitan borough (1900-1965)
- Government: St Pancras Vestry; St Pancras Borough Council (1900–1965)
  - Type: Vestry (16th century–1855); Incorporated vestry (1855–1900); Metropolitan borough council (1900–1965)
  - HQ: Vestry Hall, Pancras Road (1847-1937); Town Hall, Judd Street (1937-1965)
  - Motto: With Wisdom and Courage
- Coat of arms
- Map of borough boundary

St Pancras was a civil parish and metropolitan borough in London, England. It was an ancient parish in the county of Middlesex, governed by an administrative vestry. The parish was included in the area of responsibility of the Metropolitan Board of Works in 1855 and became part of the County of London in 1889. The parish of St Pancras became a metropolitan borough in 1900, following the London Government Act 1899, with the parish vestry replaced by a borough council. In 1965 the borough was abolished and its former area became part of the London Borough of Camden in Greater London.

== Geography ==
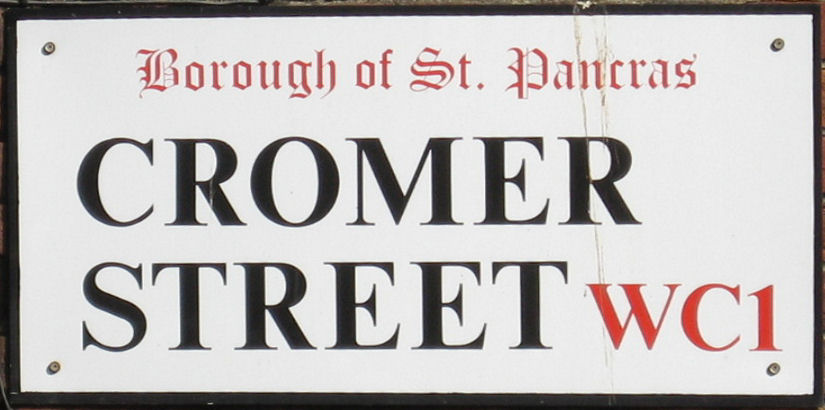
Older street sign

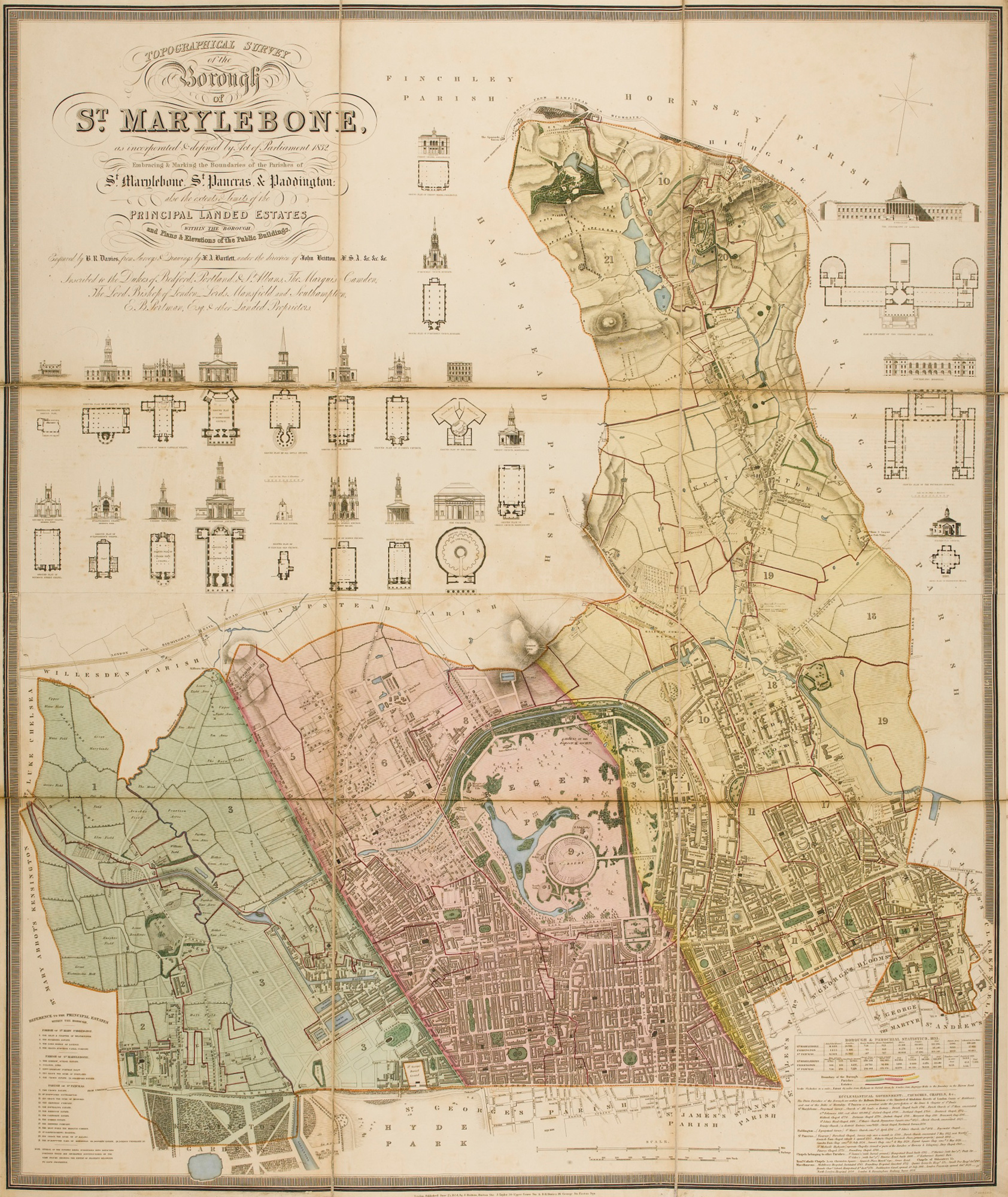
Topographical survey of St. Marylebone, St. Pancras and Paddington Parishes. Engraving by B.R. Davies, 1145 x 950mm, dated 1834.

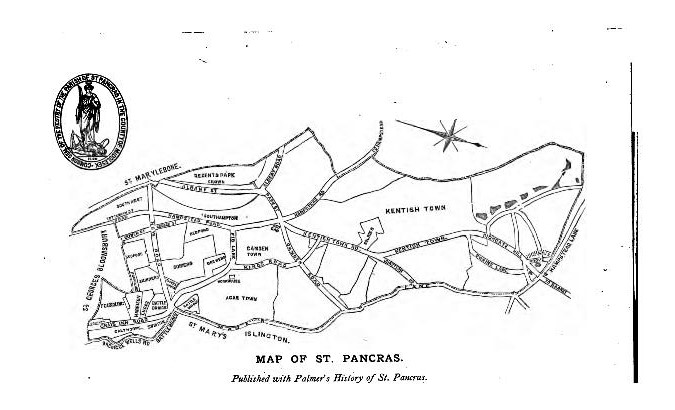
Map of St Pancras, published in 1870

The borough covered the following areas: Fitzrovia (including most of Tottenham Court Road), St Pancras, King's Cross, Somers Town, Euston, part of Regent's Park (east of The Broad Walk), most of Primrose Hill, Camden Town, Kentish Town, Gospel Oak, Dartmouth Park, and the southern portion of Highgate. Some street name signs bearing the inscription "Borough of St Pancras" are still visible today.

== Governance ==
St Pancras was just outside the area of London mortality statistics known as the bills of mortality, and was counted as one of the "five villages beyond the Bills". In 1801 it was included as a metropolitan parish for census purposes and was part of statistical returns for the Metropolis from that date.

The parish adopted the Vestries Act 1831, which provided for election of vestrymen by all ratepayers. The vestry was incorporated as a local authority by the Metropolis Management Act 1855. St Pancras had a local act to regulate the poor law so was unaffected by the Poor Law Amendment Act 1834. The Metropolitan Poor Act 1867 (30 & 31 Vict. c. 6) later provided that the Poor Law Board could add it to a poor law union or install a board of guardians. The parish was transferred from the County of Middlesex to the County of London in 1889. Following the London Government Act 1899, the civil parish of St Pancras also became a metropolitan borough. The vestry was replaced with a borough council.

== Coat of arms ==
=== Unofficial arms of 1902 ===
Unofficial arms adopted in 1901

The corporation designed its own, unofficial, coat of arms in 1902. In the centre of the shield was a depiction of St Pancras. The shield itself was in four quarters. The first quarter was described as a "fimbriated cross" (actually a saltire) representing the martyrdom of Pancras. The fourth quarter stood for Middlesex, and bore three seaxes on red: (the attributed arms of the kingdom of the middle and east Saxons). The other two quarters had a lion and cross crosslets; and blue and silver chequers. These were taken from the arms of the borough of Lewes, in Sussex. The parish church of Lewes was the first in England to be dedicated to St Pancras. At the top of the shield was shown a gold rising sun for the "dawn of Christianity" in the area. The colours used in the design were described as "gold, azure, white and crimson". The motto adopted was Constans Justitiam Moniti (Well Versed In Justice). According to Richard Crosley, writing in 1928, "This motto is unique amongst the mottoes of London in as much as the author has not discovered anyone who can translate it".

=== Official arms of 1936 ===
In 1936 the corporation received an official grant from the College of Arms. The figure of St Pancras was moved to the crest, on top of the helm. The shield featured elements from the arms of historical landowners of the borough. The scallop shells were taken from the arms of the Russell family, Dukes of Bedford. The elephant's heads were from the arms of the Marquess Camden. The roses and crossed swords represented the Dean and Chapter of St Paul's Cathedral.

The 1936 arms can still be seen over the entrance of Camden Town Hall. Charges from these arms were used, together with charges from the coats of arms of Hampstead and of Holborn, when the new coat of arms of the London Borough of Camden was designed in 1965.

== Population and area ==
The borough had an area of 2,694 acres (10.9 km^{2}). The populations recorded in National Censuses were:

St Pancras Vestry 1801-1899

Year	1801	1811	1821	1831	1841	1851	1861	1871	1881	1891
Population	31,779	46,333	71,838	103,548	129,763	166,956	198,788	221,465	236,363	234,379

Metropolitan Borough 1900-1961

Year	1901	1911	1921	1931	1941	1951	1961
Population	235,317	218,387	211,366	198,133		138,377	124,855

== Politics ==
A map showing the wards of St Pancras Metropolitan Borough as they appeared in 1916.

Under the Metropolis Management Act 1855 any parish that exceeded 2,000 ratepayers was to be divided into wards; as such the incorporated vestry of St Pancras was divided into eight wards (electing vestrymen): No. 1 (9), No. 2 (12), No. 3 (18), No. 4 (15), No. 5 (15), No. 6 (15), No. 7 (18) and No. 8 (18). The metropolitan borough divided into those same wards for its elections.

=== Parliament constituencies serving this area ===
For elections to Parliament, the borough was used as the starting base and at first divided into four:

- St Pancras East
- St Pancras North
- St Pancras South
- St Pancras West

Then, from 1918 into three:

- St Pancras North
- St Pancras South East
- St Pancras South West

From 1950 parliamentary representation was reduced to 1 1/2 seats namely:

- Holborn and St Pancras South
- St Pancras North

As such in the south, a seat straddled this Borough and the Metropolitan Borough of Holborn.

== See also ==
- List of mayors of St Pancras
