= Municipal Borough of Acton =

Former local government area in the UK

Coordinates: 51.5065°N 0.2677°W

Acton
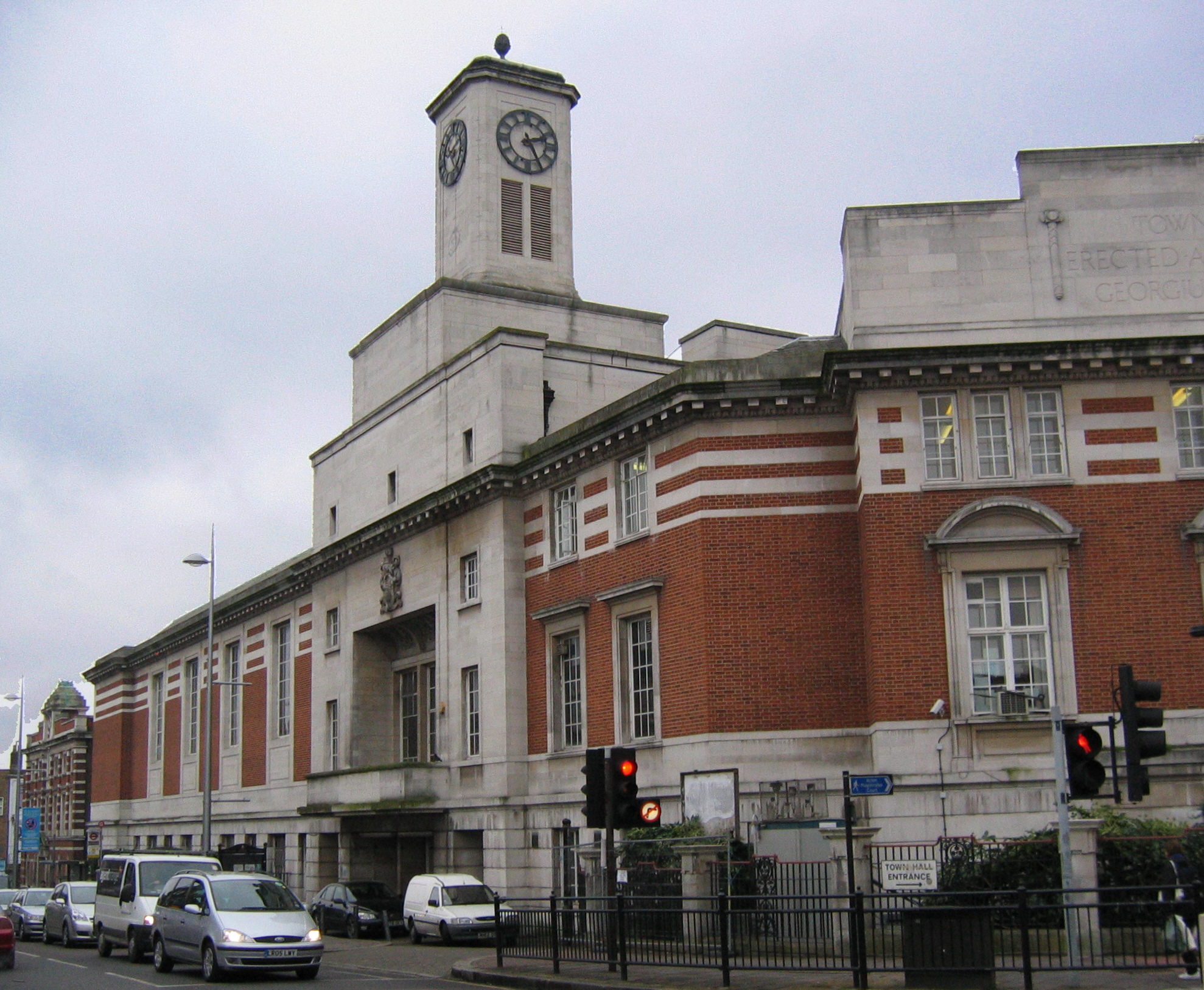
- Acton Town Hall (1910, extended 1939)

- Acton within Middlesex in 1961
- Area
  - 1894: 2,305 acres (9.3 km^{2})
  - 1965: 2,320 acres (9.4 km^{2})
- Population
  - 1901: 37,744
  - 1961: 65,586
- History
  - Created: 1894
  - Abolished: 1965
  - Succeeded by: London Borough of Ealing
- Status: Local board (1865 to 1894); Urban district (1894 to 1921); Municipal borough (from 1921); Civil parish
- Government
  - Motto: Floreat Actona (May Acton flourish)
- Arms of the borough council

Acton was a local government district in Middlesex, England from 1865 to 1965.

== Formation ==
In 1865 the Local Government Act 1858 was adopted by the parish of Acton, and a twelve-member local board of health was formed to govern the area. The Local Government Act 1894 constituted the area an urban district, and an urban district council of fifteen councillors replaced the local board. The number of councillors was increased to sixteen in 1906.

In 1921 the town was granted a charter of incorporation to become a municipal borough. The borough council consisted of a mayor, six aldermen and twenty-four councillors.

== Coat of arms ==
On incorporation in 1921 the borough was granted a coat of arms by the College of Arms. The shield featured an oak tree and the crest a branch of oak, both in reference to the derivation of the name "Acton" from "Oak Town". At the top of the shield were the arms of Middlesex County Council between an open book and a cogwheel for education and industry in the borough respectively.

In 1926, the borough council granted permission for the Canadian village of Acton, Ontario to adopt a variant of its coat of arms, substituting maple leaves for the oak leaves in the original, which it used until 1974.

== Later history ==
Prior to the Second World War the borough council was controlled by the Conservative Party. In post-war elections control passed to the Labour Party.

In 1965 the municipal borough was abolished and its former area transferred to Greater London to be combined with that of other districts to form the London Borough of Ealing. The oak from the coat of arms is now present in the coat of arms of the London Borough of Ealing.

== See also ==
- London Government Act 1963
