= Yarrow (disambiguation) =

Yarrow (Achillea millefolium) is a plant in the family Asteraceae.

Yarrow may also refer to:

- Yarrow, other species within the genus Achillea

== Places ==
- Yarrow, British Columbia, a community in Canada
- Yarrow, Northumberland, England, location of the Kielder Reservoir dam
- Yarrow, Somerset, a hamlet in England
- River Yarrow (Lancashire), England
  - Yarrow Reservoir, Lancashire, England
- Yarrow Water, Scotland
- Yarrow, Scottish Borders, Scotland
- Yarrow, Missouri, an unincorporated community in the United States

== People with the name ==
- Alder Yarrow, American wine journalist and restaurant critic
- Alfred Yarrow (1842–1932), British shipbuilder
- Arnold Yarrow (1920–2024), British actor
- Catherine Yarrow (1904–1990), British artist
- Eric Yarrow (1920–2018), British shipbuilder, son of Harold Yarrow
- Ernest Yarrow (1876–1939), British-American missionary
- Harold Yarrow (1884–1962), British shipbuilder, son of Alfred Yarrow
- H. C. Yarrow (1840–1929), American naturalist, ornithologist, and surgeon
- Joan Rosemary Yarrow (1928–2023), English singer and recording artist Rosemary Squires
- Norma Yarrow (born 1963), Peruvian politician
- Peter Yarrow (1938–2025), American singer and member of Peter, Paul and Mary

== Arts, entertainment, and media ==
- Yarrow (novel), a novel by Charles de Lint
- Yarrowstalks, an underground publication from the 1960s and 1970s
- "The Dowie Dens of Yarrow" or simply "Yarrow," an Anglo-Scottish border ballad

== Brands and enterprises ==
- Yarrow boiler, developed by Yarrow Shipbuilders and widely used in ships
- Yarrow Shipbuilders, in Glasgow, Scotland

== Other uses ==
- Yarrow, a codename for the Fedora Core 1 Linux distribution
- Yarrow algorithm. a family of cryptographic pseudorandom number generators
- Yarrow baronets, a title in the Baronetage of the United Kingdom
- Yarrow Stadium, former name of Stadium Taranaki, New Plymouth, New Zealand
- Yarrow sticks method, an approach to I Ching divination
- USS Yarrow (SP-1010), a United States Navy patrol boat

== See also ==
- Jarrow, a town in Tyne and Wear, England
