= Bertrand Dawson, 1st Viscount Dawson of Penn =

British royal physician (1864–1945)

The Right Honourable The Viscount Dawson of Penn GCVO KCB KCMG PC FRCP
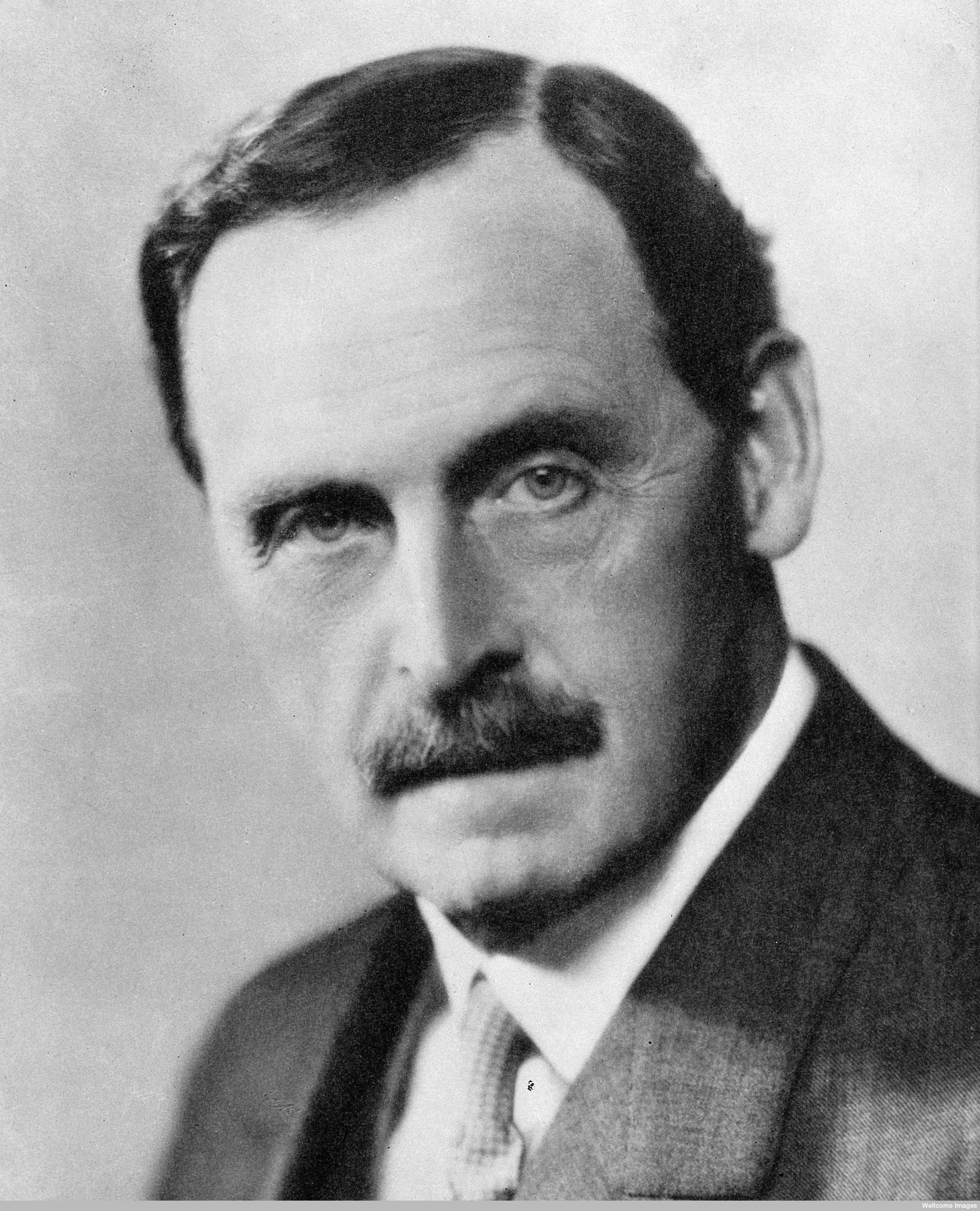

Member of the House of Lords Lord Temporal
- In office 1 January 1920 – 7 March 1945; Hereditary peerage
- Preceded by: Peerage created
- Succeeded by: Peerage extinct

Personal details
- Born: 9 March 1864 Croydon, England
- Died: 7 March 1945 (aged 80) London, England
- Spouse: Minnie Ethel Yarrow (m. 1900)
- Children: 3
- Relatives: Sir Eric Yarrow (nephew); Sir Harold Yarrow (brother-in-law); Sir Alfred Yarrow (father-in-law); Sir Ian Bowater (son-in-law); 1st Viscount Eccles (son-in-law); 2nd Viscount Eccles (grandson); David Yarrow (great-nephew); Damian Lewis (great-grandson)
- Occupation: Physician

Bertrand Edward Dawson, 1st Viscount Dawson of Penn, GCVO, KCB, KCMG, PC, FRCP (9 March 1864 – 7 March 1945) was a physician to the British royal family and President of the Royal College of Physicians from 1931 to 1937. He is known for his responsibility in the death of George V, who under his care was injected with a fatal dose of cocaine and morphine to hasten his death.

== Early life and education ==
Bertrand Edward Dawson was born on 9 March 1864 in Croydon, the son of Henry Dawson, of Purley, an architect, and Frances Emily Wheeler.

He entered St Paul's School in London in 1877 and University College London in 1879, graduating in 1888 with a Bachelor of Science (BSc) degree. He graduated from the Royal London Hospital in 1893 with a Doctor of Medicine (MD) degree.

== Career ==
After graduation he was registered as a Member of the Royal College of Surgeons (MRCS) in 1890 and invested as a Fellow of the Royal College of Physicians (FRCP) in 1903, and worked as a physician for several years. In 1907, Dawson joined the Royal Household as a physician-extraordinary to King Edward VII, an office he held until 1910, when he was promoted to a physician-in-ordinary under King George V until 1914. He was appointed Knight Commander of the Royal Victorian Order (KCVO) in 1911. Following the outbreak of World War I, he was given the rank of colonel in the Royal Army Medical Corps in November 1914. He served on the Western Front in France from 1915 to 1919, rising to the rank of major-general (he had served as a Royal Army Medical Corps officer in the Territorial Force for many years), noticing the poor physical fitness of British troops and conducting research into trench fever. He was mentioned in dispatches.

He held the office of Physician-in-Ordinary to King George V until 1936 and was appointed Knight of Grace in the Venerable Order of Saint John and Companion of the Order of the Bath (CB) in 1916, Knight Grand Cross of the Royal Victorian Order (GCVO) in the 1918 New Year Honours, and Knight Commander of the Order of St Michael and St George (KCMG) in 1919.

== Report on the Future Provision of Medical and Allied Services ==
Dawson was commissioned whilst he was Chairman of the Consultative Council on Medical and Allied Services in 1919 by Christopher Addison, the first British Minister of Health to produce a report on "schemes requisite for the systematised provision of such forms of medical and allied services as should, in the opinion of the Council, be available for the inhabitants of a given area". An Interim Report on the Future Provision of Medical and Allied Services (the so-called Dawson report) was published in 1920, though no further report ever appeared. The report laid down details plans for a network of Primary and Secondary Health Centres, together with architectural drawings of different sorts of centres. The report was very influential in debates about the National Health Service when it was set up in 1948.

== Titles ==
In the 1920 New Year Honours, he was elevated to the peerage as Baron Dawson of Penn, of Penn, in the County of Buckinghamshire and became an active member of the House of Lords. In April 1926 he was appointed Knight Commander of the Order of the Bath (KCB), and he was appointed to the Privy Council in the 1929 Birthday Honours.

He held the office of President of the Royal Society of Medicine from 1928 to 1930 and President of the Royal College of Physicians from 1931 to 1938.

== Death of George V ==
On the night of 20 January 1936, King George V was close to death; his physicians issued a bulletin with the words "The King's life is moving peacefully towards its close." Dawson's private diary, unearthed after his death and made public in 1986, reveals that the King's last words, a mumbled "God damn you!", were addressed to his nurse, Catherine Black, when she gave him a sedative that night. Dawson, who supported the "gentle growth of euthanasia" but opposed a 1936 Voluntary Euthanasia (Legalisation) Bill in the Lords, admitted in the diary that he ended the King's life with a lethal dose of morphine and cocaine:

At about 11 o'clock it was evident that the last stage might endure for many hours, unknown to the Patient but little comporting with that dignity and serenity which he so richly merited and which demanded a brief final scene. Hours of waiting just for the mechanical end when all that is really life has departed only exhausts the onlookers & keeps them so strained that they cannot avail themselves of the solace of thought, communion or prayer. I therefore decided to determine the end and injected (myself) morphia gr.3/4 and shortly afterwards cocaine gr.1 into the distended jugular vein...In about 1/4 an hour - breathing quieter - appearance more placid - physical struggle gone.

Dawson said that he acted to preserve the King's dignity, to prevent further strain on the family, and so that the King's death at 11:55 pm could be announced in the morning edition of The Times newspaper rather than "less appropriate ... evening journals". To make doubly sure that this would happen Dawson telephoned his wife in London asking her to let The Times know when the announcement was imminent.

Dawson's public stance on euthanasia was expressed later that year when he opposed a move in the Lords to legalise it because it "belongs to the wisdom and conscience of the medical profession and not to the realm of law". In 1986, the contents of Dawson's diary were made public for the first time, in which he clearly acknowledged what he had done—which was described by a medical reviewer in 1994 as an arrogant "convenience killing".

== Further career ==
In the 1936 Birthday Honours, on 30 October, he was advanced in the peerage as Viscount Dawson of Penn, in the County of Buckingham and remained in the Medical Households of King Edward VIII and his brother, King George VI. During the abdication crisis of 1936, Lord Dawson of Penn was believed to have attempted to influence the retirement of prime minister Stanley Baldwin on health grounds, thereby to reduce pressure on the king to abdicate. The account of his close colleague William Evans attempts to clear Dawson of any suspicions in this regard:

Dawson was physician and friend to both parties in the feud that was then taking place between the King and the Prime Minister. That Dawson, although initially inclined to the view that Baldwin should retire, eventually pronounced on the Prime Minister's health from medical grounds exclusively, and uninfluenced by either political or moral considerations, was confirmed through his immediate acceptance of a young medical colleague's opinion that the Prime Minister's heart was healthy, which made Baldwin's retirement on the grounds of his unfitness from heart trouble no longer tenable, so that any attempt to dethrone the Prime Minister on that assumption must fail.

== Personal life and death ==
Lord Dawson of Penn married Minnie Ethel Yarrow, daughter of Sir Alfred Fernandez Yarrow, 1st Baronet, of Homestead, on 18 December 1900. They had three daughters:

- The Honourable Sybil Frances Dawson (1904 – 2 June 1977), married on 1 October 1929 David Eccles, 1st Viscount Eccles, and had issue
- The Honourable Ursula Margaret Dawson (1907 – 16 November 1999), married on 10 December 1927 Sir Ian Frank Bowater, Lord Mayor of London, and had issue, including Charlotte Mary Bowater, mother of the actor Damian Lewis
- The Honourable Rosemary Monica Dawson (1913 – 13 June 1998), married on 30 November 1939 Sir John Wrightson, 3rd Baronet (19 June 1911 – 1983), and had four children, including Sir Charles Mark Garmondsway Wrightson, 4th Baronet (18 Feb 1951 – ).

Dawson died from bronchopneumonia in London on 7 March 1945, aged 80. As he had no male heirs, on his death his titles became extinct.

Coat of arms of Bertrand Dawson, 1st Viscount Dawson of Penn
Crest Upon a mount Vert between two wings Sable as many torches in saltire inflamed Proper. Escutcheon Ermines on a pile Argent a rod of Aesculapius Gules on a chief engrailed Or three martlets also Gules. Supporters On either side a wolf Sable muzzled collared and chained the chain reflexed over the back Or. Motto Droit Et Avant

== Footnotes ==
Academic offices
Preceded by Sir John Bradford	President of the Royal College of Physicians; 1931–1938	Succeeded by Robert Hutchison
Peerage of the United Kingdom
New creation	Viscount Dawson of Penn; 1936–1945	Extinct
New creation	Baron Dawson of Penn; 1920–1945	Extinct
