= Damian Lewis =

British actor (born 1971)

Damian Lewis CBE
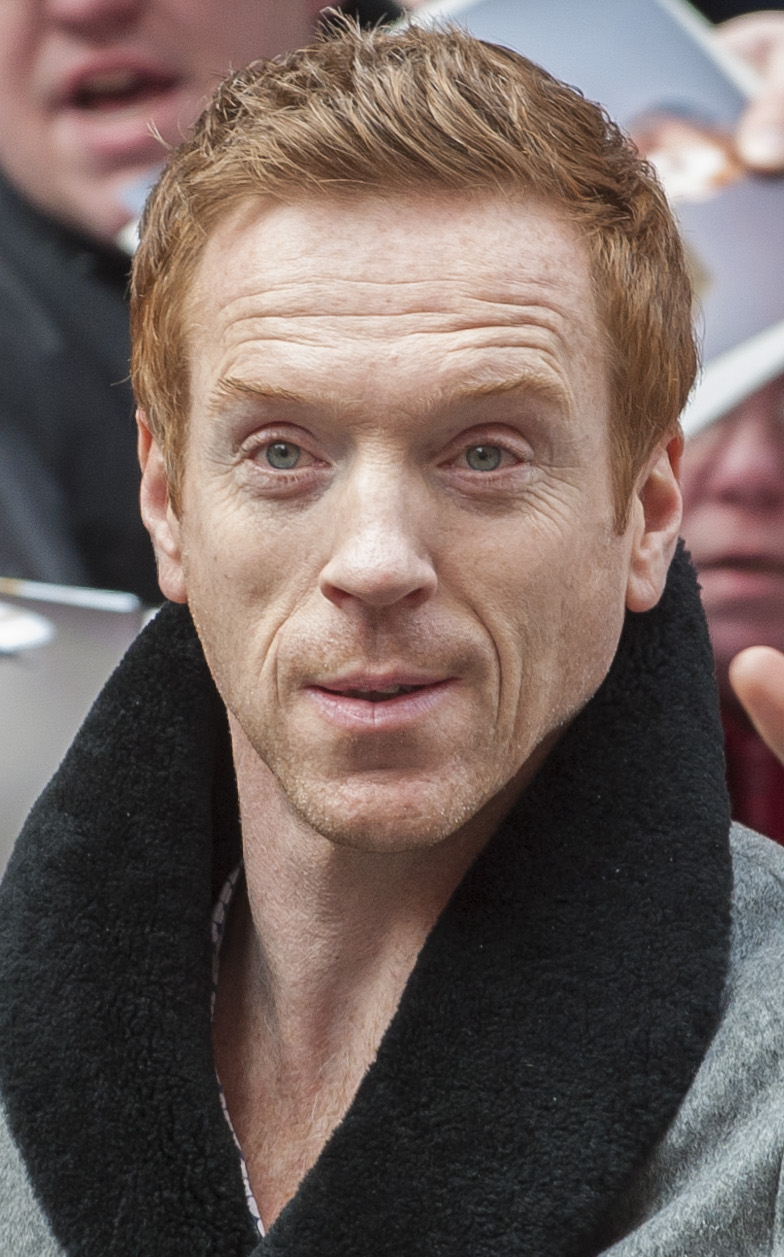
- Lewis in 2015
- Born: Damian Watcyn Lewis; 11 February 1971 (age 55); London, England
- Education: Guildhall School of Music and Drama (BA)
- Occupations: Actor; musician; presenter; producer
- Years active: 1993–present
- Spouse: Helen McCrory (m. 2007; died 2021)
- Partner: Alison Mosshart (2022–present)
- Children: 2
- Relatives: Ian Bowater (grandfather); Bertrand Dawson (great-grandfather); Frank Bowater (great-grandfather); Alfred Yarrow (great-great-grandfather); William Vansittart Bowater (great-great-grandfather)
- Awards: Full list
- Musical career
- Genres: Folk; jazz; roots rock; rock; blues
- Instruments: Guitar; vocals
- Label: Decca

Damian Watcyn Lewis (born 11 February 1971) is an English actor and musician. He rose to prominence portraying U.S. Army Major Richard Winters in the HBO miniseries Band of Brothers. Lewis won a Primetime Emmy Award and a Golden Globe Award for his portrayal of U.S. Marine Sergeant Nicholas Brody in the Showtime series Homeland, and received nominations for his performance as Henry VIII of England in Wolf Hall. He portrayed Bobby Axelrod in the Showtime series Billions in six out of seven seasons, and appeared in Once Upon a Time in Hollywood (2019) as actor Steve McQueen.

== Early life and education ==
Damian Watcyn Lewis was born on 11 February 1971 in St John's Wood, London, the eldest son of Charlotte Mary (née Bowater) and John "J." Watcyn Lewis, a City insurance broker with Lloyd's. His paternal grandparents were Welsh, and he says he considers himself "London Welsh". His maternal grandfather was Lt-Col. Sir Ian Bowater, Lord Mayor of London, and his great-great-grandfather was the eminent naval shipbuilder and philanthropist Sir Alfred Yarrow, 1st Baronet (see Yarrow Shipbuilders), who was of partial Sephardic Jewish descent. His brother is writer, producer, and director, Gareth Lewis. Lewis has said that he "went to English boarding schools and grew up around people very much like [his character] Soames and in a milieu very much like the Forsytes'".

As a child, Lewis made several visits to the US to visit relatives during summer breaks. He decided to become an actor at the age of 16.

He was educated at the independent Ashdown House School in Forest Row, East Sussex, then Eton College, and graduated B.A. from the Guildhall School of Music and Drama in 1993.

== Career ==
Lewis once worked as a telemarketer selling car alarms. His first television appearance was as a medical student in "Hickory Dickory Dock", a feature-length episode of Agatha Christie's Poirot, an ITV Studios TV production, broadcast in 1995. He also appeared as a rakish student in an early episode of the drama series A Touch of Frost (1996). He appeared in Robinson Crusoe (1997) as Patrick Conner.

At this time he was also working as an actor with the Royal Shakespeare Company, playing among other roles Borgheim in Adrian Noble's production of Henrik Ibsen's Little Eyolf and Posthumus Leonatus in William Shakespeare's Cymbeline. He would later go on to star in another of Ibsen's plays, as Karsten Bernick in Pillars of the Community at the National Theatre in November 2005.

He also appeared in Jonathan Kent's production of Hamlet, playing Laertes. This production was seen by Steven Spielberg, who later cast Lewis as lead role Richard Winters, respected leader of Easy Company in Band of Brothers (2001), the first role of several that required him to have a credible American accent.

He was in the 2000 series called Hearts and Bones as the love interest of Dervla Kirwan. Subsequently, Lewis portrayed Soames Forsyte in the ITV series The Forsyte Saga, which earned him positive reviews. He returned to the US to star in Dreamcatcher, a Lawrence Kasdan film about a man who becomes possessed by an evil alien. The character is American but when possessed he takes on a British accent. On the heels of this role, he starred in Keane as a Manhattanite with a fragile mental state who is searching for his missing daughter. Despite the film's poor box-office, Lewis's performance in the role was very well reviewed.

He played Jeffrey Archer in the TV special Jeffrey Archer: The Truth. Since 2004, he has appeared in a number of films, as well as the 2005 BBC TV adaptation of the Shakespeare comedy Much Ado About Nothing, as part of the ShakespeaRe-Told season. Lewis played the role of Yassen Gregorovich in the film Stormbreaker. In 2006, he appeared in Stephen Poliakoff's BBC drama Friends and Crocodiles. He has appeared on BBC's Have I Got News for You as guest host several times; on 10 November 2006, 1 May 2009, 18 November 2010, 27 April 9 November 2012, 31 October 2014 and 2 October 2020.

In 2008, Lewis starred as the main character Charlie Crews in the American television series Life on NBC. The show premiered in the US on 26 September 2007 and was affected by the 2007–08 Writers Guild of America strike. Only half of the first season's shows were produced. Regardless, the show won a 2008 AFI Award for best television series. Although the show received critical acclaim, when it returned the following television season, it was shuffled from night to night, and eventually cancelled by NBC to clear its time slot for The Jay Leno Show.

Lewis appeared the following year in the lead role in The Baker, a film directed by his brother, Gareth. Damian took a supporting role of Rizza in The Escapist, which he also helped produce. He led the cast in Martin Crimp's version of Molière's comedy, The Misanthrope, which opened in December 2009 at the Comedy Theatre, London. Other cast members included Tara Fitzgerald, Keira Knightley and Dominic Rowan.

Lewis played Tory Prime Minister Simon Laity in two seasons of Number 10 on BBC Radio 4. He played Gareth, the father of an eleven-year-old Liverpool fan, in the 2011 film Will. From 2011 to 2013, Lewis had a starring role as Gunnery Sergeant Nicholas Brody in the Showtime series Homeland, for which he won a Primetime Emmy Award. In 2013, he narrated poetry for The Love Book App, an "interactive anthology of love literature developed by Allie Byrne Esiri".

In 2016, he began starring as billionaire financial manager Bobby Axelrod in the Showtime series Billions. He left the show in 2021 after five seasons, but returned for half of season 7. In 2016, he appeared in the British spy film Our Kind of Traitor. In 2024, he played a dual role as Peter Radley and his brother Will Radley, alongside Kelly Macdonald in the vampire comedy film The Radleys.

In 2026, Lewis starred as the Caller in Kevin Macdonald's psychological thriller The Runner, alongside Gal Gadot, Rory Wilmot and Alfred Enoch. Gadot portrayed Maia, a London-based lawyer whose son is abducted and who is forced to follow a series of cryptic demands from the mysterious Caller, played by Lewis. The film was shot in London in 2025, during which production attracted media attention after pro-Palestinian activists disrupted filming due to Gadot's involvement in the project.

=== Music ===
In an interview with The Guardian in October 2022, Lewis said that he had long-standing ambitions to be a musician, and had been collaborating with jazz artist Giacomo Smith, firstly on cover songs and then writing new material for an album that would be released in 2023: "I started writing and found out there was lots that I actually did want to write, and before we knew it we had a record's worth of songs. We’ve ended up with a rootsy, jazzy, rock’n’rolly, singer-songwritery-type album". Lewis released his debut single, "Down On the Bowery", on 13 April 2023. His debut album, Mission Creep, was released in June that year on Decca Records. On 9 July 2023, he sang the national anthem at the British Grand Prix, accompanied by a saxophonist.

== Other ventures ==
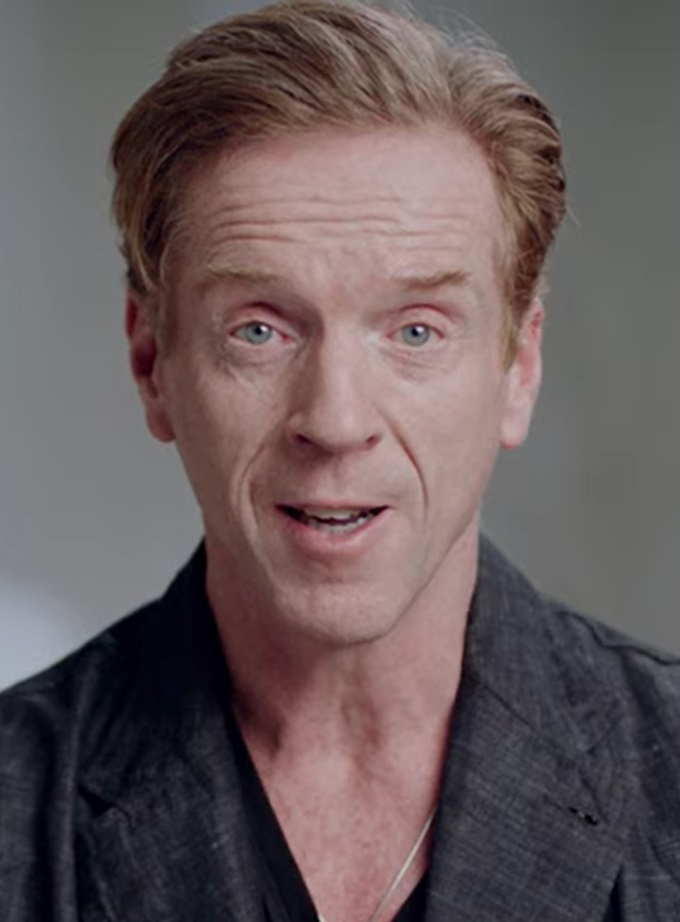
Damian Lewis Soccer Aid for UNICEF 2024

In 2009, Lewis featured in Inspired By Music, a book commissioned by the Prince's Trust, written and photographed by celebrity photographer Cambridge Jones, and sponsored by Starbucks. It features personal reflections by 36 celebrities as well as four ordinary people helped by The Prince's Trust, about musical lyrics that inspired them. Lewis's photo portrait also featured in Jones's exhibition Talking Pictures, featuring famous people of Welsh descent, that toured the world from 2010.

In 2010, Lewis became a Trade Justice ambassador for the charity Christian Aid. In May 2006, June 2016, June 2018 and June 2022, he played for England in Soccer Aid, and played golf for Europe in the All*Star Cup in August 2006, both shown on ITV.

During the COVID-19 pandemic, Lewis and his wife Helen McCrory supported Feed NHS, a fundraiser to give food from high street restaurants to NHS staff. By April 2020, they had raised £1 million for the charity. The initiative started in London, but following its success, plans were announced to roll it out to other cities throughout the UK.

== Personal life ==
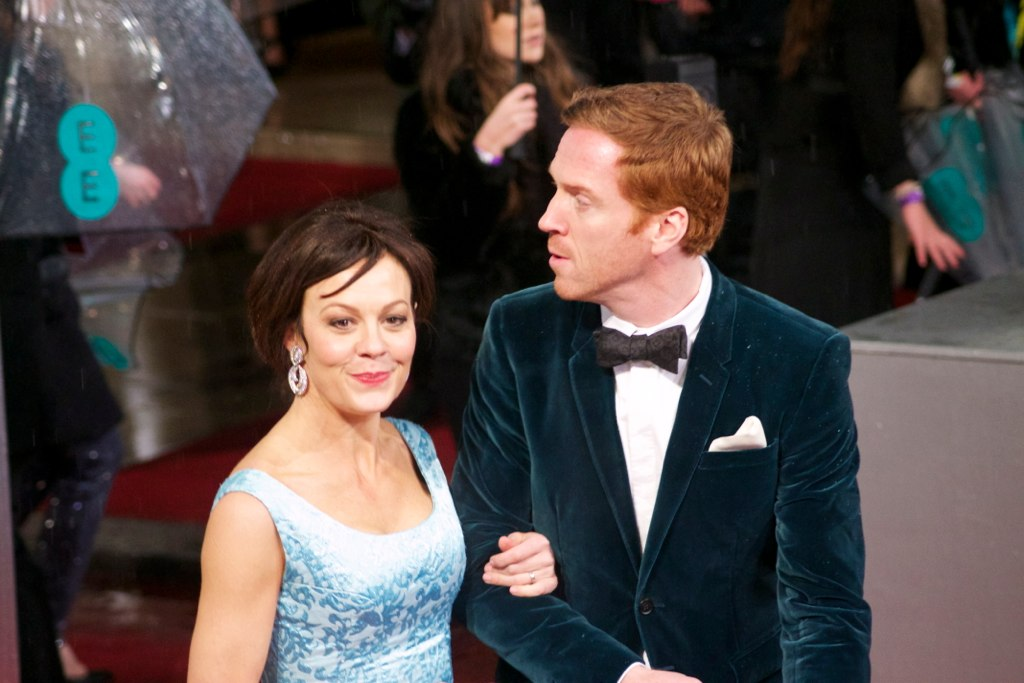
Helen McCrory and Lewis at the 2013 British Academy Film Awards

Lewis suffered a period of depression following a motorcycle accident in north London in 1998. He is a supporter of Premier League club Liverpool.

Having previously dated Katie Razzall, Kristin Davis and Sophia Myles, Lewis married actress Helen McCrory on 4 July 2007. They have a daughter and a son. McCrory died of cancer on 16 April 2021, aged 52. Since 2022, he has been in a relationship with singer Alison Mosshart.

== Acting credits ==
Key
†	Denotes films that have not yet been released

=== Film ===
Year	Title	Role	Notes	Ref.
1997	Robinson Crusoe	Patrick		
2003	Dreamcatcher	Gary "Jonesy" Jones		
2004	Keane	William Keane		
2004	Brides	Norman Harris	Original Greek Title: Νύφες	
2005	Chromophobia	Marcus Aylesbury		
2005	An Unfinished Life	Gary Winston		
2006	The Situation	Dan Murphy		
2006	Stormbreaker	Yasha "Yassen" Gregorovich	Released in the United States as Alex Rider: Operation Stormbreaker	
2007	The Baker	Milo "The Baker" Shakespeare	Also producer; also known as Assassin in Love	
2008	The Escapist	Rizza		
2011	Your Highness	Boremont		
2011	Will	Gareth		
2012	The Sweeney	Detective Chief Inspector Frank Haskins		
2013	Romeo & Juliet	Lord Capulet		
2014	The Silent Storm	Balor McNeil		
2015	Queen of the Desert	Lt-Col. Charles Doughty-Wylie, VC		
2015	Bill	Sir Richard Hawkins		
2016	Our Kind of Traitor	Hector		
2019	Run This Town	Rob Ford		
2019	Once Upon a Time in Hollywood	Steve McQueen		
2020	Dream Horse	Howard Davies		
2024	The Radleys	Peter Radley / Will Radley		
2025	Orwell: 2+2=5	George Orwell		
2025	Fackham Hall	Lord Davenport		
2026	Pressure	Field Marshal Bernard Montgomery		
2026	The Runner	The Caller		
2027	Jack of Spades †	TBA	Post-production	
TBA	The Return of Stanley Atwell †	Barnaby	Post-production	

=== Television ===
Year	Title	Role	Notes	Ref.
1993	Micky Love	Clive	Television film	
1995	Agatha Christie's Poirot	Leonard Bateson	Episode: "Hickory Dickory Dock"	
1996	A Touch of Frost	Adam Weston	Episode: "Deep Waters"	
1999	Warriors	Lt. Neil Loughrey	Television film	
2000	Life Force	Kurt Glemser	5 episodes	
2000	Hearts and Bones	Mark Rose	Main role (season 1)	
2001	Band of Brothers	Maj. Richard D. Winters	Miniseries (Main role, 10 episodes)	
2002	Jeffrey Archer: The Truth	Jeffrey Archer	Television film	
2002–2003	The Forsyte Saga	Soames Forsyte	Main role	
2003	The Forsyte Saga: To Let	Soames Forsyte	Television film	
2005	Colditz	Cpl / Lt. Nicholas McGrade	2 episodes	
2005	Friends and Crocodiles	Paul	Television film	
2005	Much Ado About Nothing	Benedick	Television film	
2006–2020	Have I Got News for You	Presenter	7 episodes	
2007–2009	Life	Charlie Crews	Main role	
2011	Stolen	D.I. Anthony Carter	Television film	
2011–2014	Homeland	Nicholas Brody	Main role	
2015	Wolf Hall	Henry VIII	Miniseries	
2016–2023	Billions	Bobby Axelrod	Main role (seasons 1-5, 7)	
2019	Spy Wars	Host	8 episodes	
2022	A Spy Among Friends	Nicholas Elliott	Main role; also producer	
2024	Wolf Hall: The Mirror and the Light	Henry VIII	Miniseries	
2025	The American Revolution	King George III	TV documentary	

=== Theatre ===
Year	Title	Role	Theatre	Ref.
1994	The School for Wives	Horace	Almeida Theatre	
1995	Hamlet	Laertes	Belasco Theatre	
1996	Little Eyolf	Borgheim	Swan Theatre	
1997	Cymbeline	Posthumus Leonatus	Royal Shakespeare Theatre	
1998	Much Ado About Nothing	Don John	Barbican Theatre	
1998	Into the Woods	The Wolf; Cinderella's Prince	Donmar Warehouse	
2003–2004	Five Gold Rings	Daniel	Almeida Theatre	
2005	Pillars of the Community	Karsten Bernick	National Theatre	
2009	The Misanthrope	Alceste	Comedy Theatre	
2015	American Buffalo	Teach	Wyndham's Theatre	
2017	The Goat, or Who Is Sylvia?	Martin Gray	Theatre Royal Haymarket	

== Discography ==
=== Albums ===
Title	Album details
Mission Creep	Released: 16 June 2023; Label: Decca; Format: Digital download, streaming

=== Singles ===
Title	Year	Album
"Down On the Bowery"	2023	Mission Creep
"Zaragoza"	2023	Mission Creep
"Makin' Plans"	2023	Mission Creep
"She Comes"	2023	Mission Creep

=== Other appearances ===
Title	Year	Credited artist(s)	Album
"William I – Introduction by Damien Lewis"	2021	Damian Lewis	Music of Kings and Queens
"Henry VIII – Introduction by Damien Lewis"	2021	Damian Lewis	Music of Kings and Queens
"Charles II – Introduction by Damien Lewis"	2021	Damian Lewis	Music of Kings and Queens
"George II – Introduction by Damien Lewis"	2021	Damian Lewis	Music of Kings and Queens
"George VI – Introduction by Damien Lewis"	2021	Damian Lewis	Music of Kings and Queens

== Accolades and honours ==
=== Honours ===
Lewis was appointed an Officer of the Order of the British Empire (OBE) in 2014 for "services to drama" and promoted Commander of the Order of the British Empire (CBE) in 2022 for "services to drama and charity".

=== Awards and nominations ===
Lewis' portrayal of U.S. Army Major Richard Winters in the HBO miniseries Band of Brothers earned him a Golden Globe nomination. Lewis' performance as U.S. Marine Gunnery Sergeant Nicholas Brody in the Showtime series Homeland won him a Primetime Emmy Award and a Golden Globe Award in 2012. His performance as Henry VIII of England in Wolf Hall earned him his third Primetime Emmy nomination and fourth Golden Globe nomination.

== Ancestry ==
Ancestors of Damian Lewis

John Watcyn Lewis
Damian Lewis
William Vansittart Bowater
Frank Bowater
Ian Bowater
Charlotte Mary Bowater
Bertrand Dawson
Ursula Margaret Dawson
Alfred Yarrow
Minnie Ethel Yarrow
