= Bowater (disambiguation) =

Bowater was a British and later American paper milling company.

Bowater may also refer to:

- Bowater (surname)
- Bowater baronets
