= Peter Candler =

English rugby union player

- Full name: Peter Laurence Candler
- Born: 28 January 1914 Exeter, England
- Died: 27 November 1991 (aged 77) Natal, South Africa
- School: Sherborne School
- University: University of Cambridge

Rugby union career
- Position: Centre / Stand-off
International career
Years	Team	Apps	(Points)
1935–38	England	10	(6)

Peter Laurence Candler (28 January 1914 – 27 November 1991) was an English international rugby union player.

== Biography ==
Born in Exeter, Candler was educated at Sherborne School, St Bartholomew's Hospital and University of Cambridge, where he gained a blue playing as a centre three quarter on the 1934 varsity side. He also played rugby in the United Hospitals Cup, as well as for London club Richmond. While based in London, Candler represented Middlesex, otherwise played county fixtures for his native Devon.

Candler was an England player from 1935 and 1938. He was used as a stand-off for the first two years, including in the historic win over the All Blacks at Twickenham. His contributions to England's triple crown-winning 1937 Home Nations campaign were as a centre. He finished his England career in 1938 with 10 caps.

A gynecologist, Candler later worked as a Medical Officer for the Kenyan government. He was joined in Kenya by his younger twin brothers, one of whom was killed by terrorists in 1954. His wife, Sheilagh, was the youngest daughter of WW1 flying ace Olaus Johnsen and a grand-daughter of London Lord Mayor Frank Bowater.

== See also ==
- List of England national rugby union players
