= Bowater (surname) =

Bowater is an English surname. Notable people with the surname include:

- Alexis Bowater British television journalist and presenter
- Edward Bowater (1787–1861), British Army general
- Frank Bowater (1866–1947), English politician
- George Bowater (1911–1966), English footballer
- Vansittart Bowater (1862–1938), English politician
- William Vansittart Bowater (1838–1907), British businessman
