= Consultative Council on Medical and Allied Services =

The Consultative Council on Medical and Allied Services was established under the Ministry of Health Act 1919 along with the Consultative Council on National Health Insurance.

Bertrand Dawson was the first chair.

There were disagreements in the council about finance matters, and whether health authorities should be statutory committees of existing local authorities, or bodies established purely to manage health services.

It produced an Interim Report on the Future Provision of Medical and Allied Services in 1920 which was influential in later debates about the future of the National Health Service

Records of the Councils and their subcommittees are held in the National Archives.
