= Bowater baronets =

Baronetcies in the Baronetage of the United Kingdom

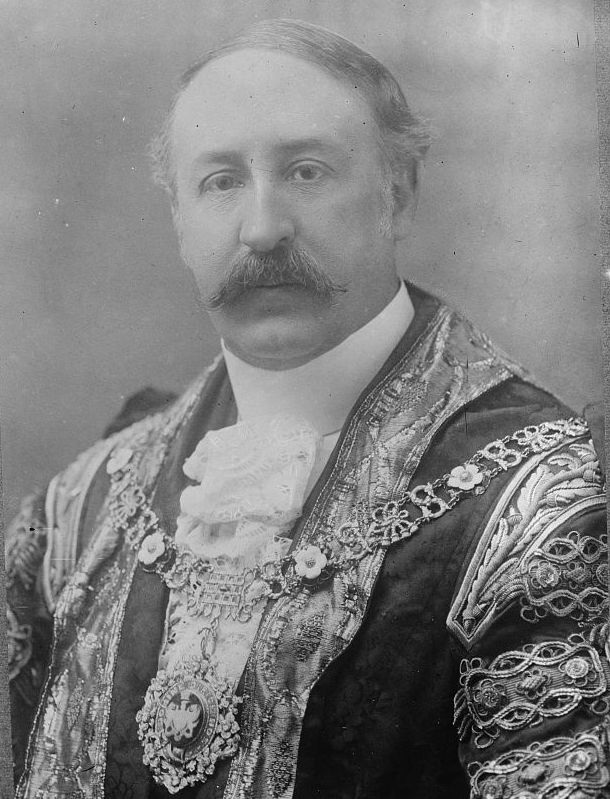
Sir Vansittart Bowater, 1st Baronet

There have been two baronetcies created for members of the Bowater family, both in the Baronetage of the United Kingdom. Both creations are extant as of 2010.

The Bowater baronetcy, of Hill Crest in the Borough of Croydon, was created in 1914 for Vansittart Bowater, Lord Mayor of London (a one-year office) from 1913 to 1914.

The Bowater baronetcy, of Friston in the County of Suffolk, was created in 1939 for Frank Bowater, a paper entrepreneur and Lord Mayor of London 1938–1939. He was the younger brother of the above. His son, the second Baronet was Lord Mayor of London 1953–1954.

Frederick Bowater (1856–1924), fourth son of William Vansittart Bowater and brother of the above Baronets was created a KBE (knight) in 1920. His son, Sir Eric Vansittart Bowater (1895–1962), was Director-General of the Ministry of Aircraft Production between 1940 and 1943 and was knighted in 1944.

Sir Ian Bowater, second son of the second-created Baronet, was Lord Mayor of London from 1969 to 1970.

== Bowater baronets, of Hill Crest (1914) ==
- Sir (Thomas) Vansittart Bowater, 1st Baronet (1862–1938), for one term Lord Mayor of London
- Sir Rainald Vansittart Bowater, 2nd Baronet (1888–1945)
- Sir (Thomas) Dudley Blennerhassett Bowater, 3rd Baronet (1889–1972)
- Sir John Vansittart Bowater, 4th Baronet (1918–2008)
- Sir Michael Patrick Bowater, 5th Baronet (born 1949)

There is no heir.

== Bowater baronets, of Friston (1939) ==
- Sir Frank Henry Bowater, 1st Baronet (1866–1947), for one term Lord Mayor of London
- Sir Noël Vansittart Bowater, 2nd Baronet (1892–1984), for one term Lord Mayor of London
- Sir Euan David Vansittart Bowater, 3rd Baronet (born 1935)

The heir apparent is the present holder's eldest son Moray David Bowater (born 1967).

== Line of succession ==
- William Vansittart Bowater (1838–1907)
  - Sir Thomas Vansittart Bowater, 1st Baronet, of Hill Crest (1862–1938) 586th Lord Mayor of London
    - Sir Rainald Vansittart Bowater, 2nd Baronet (1888–1945)
    - Sir Thomas Dudley Blennerhassett Bowater, 3rd Baronet (1889–1972)
    - Victor Spencer Bowater (1891–1967)
      - Sir John Vansittart Bowater, 4th Baronet (1918–2008)
        - Sir Michael Patrick Bowater, 5th Baronet (born 1949)
  - Major Sir Frank Henry Bowater, 1st Baronet, of Friston (1866–1947) 611th Lord Mayor of London
    - Sir Noël Vansittart Bowater, 2nd Baronet (1892–1984) 626th Lord Mayor of London
      - Sir Euan David Vansittart Bowater, 3rd Baronet (born 1935)
        - (1) Moray David Bowater (born 1967)
        - (2) Lucien Ross Thomas Bowater (born 1973)
    - Lt.-Col. Sir Ian Frank Bowater (1904–1982) 642nd Lord Mayor of London
      - (3) Michael Ian Vansittart Bowater (born 1934)
