= Samuel Barnett (reformer) =

English cleric (1844–1913)

The Reverend Canon Samuel Barnett
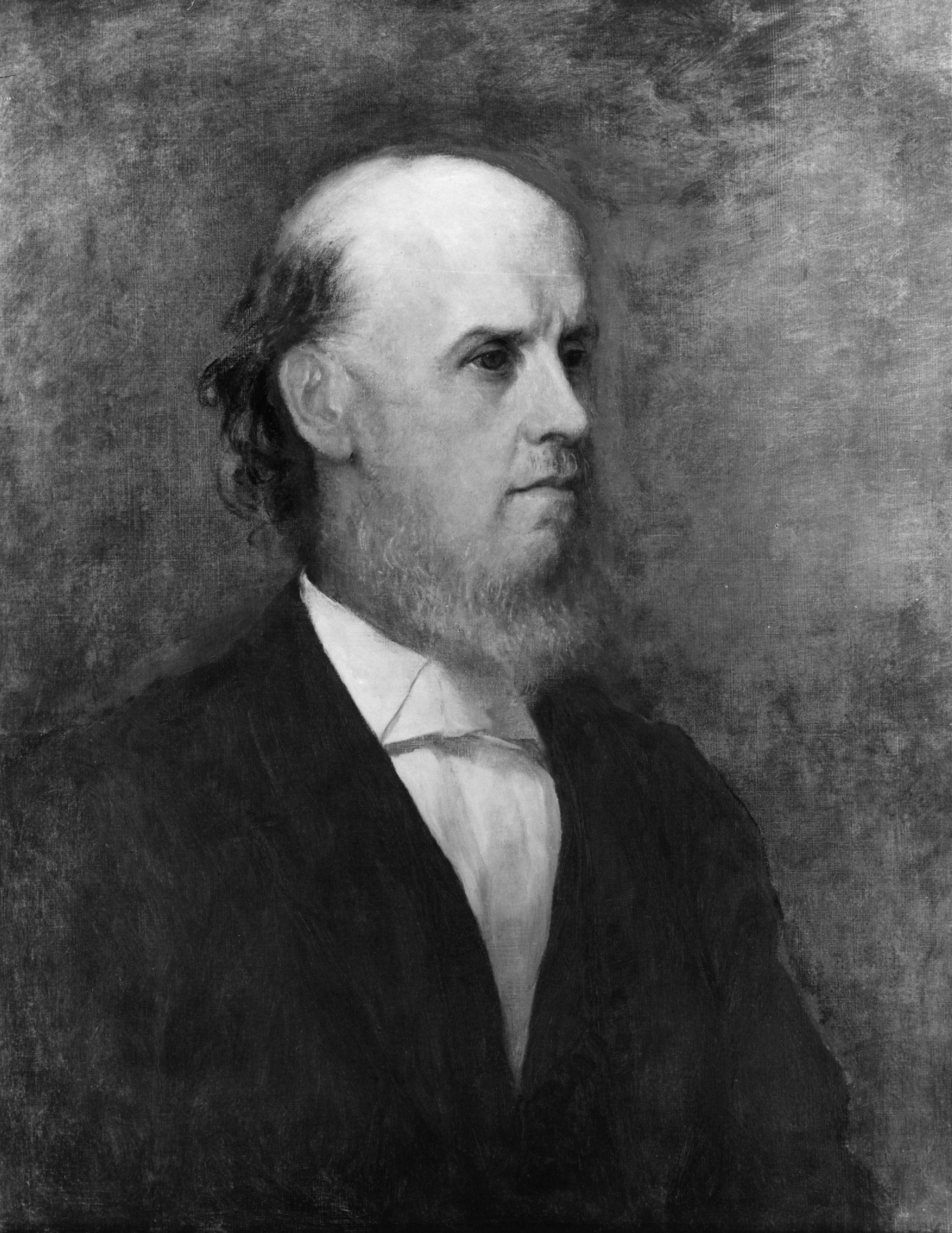
- Samuel Augustus Barnett by George Frederic Watts

Personal details
- Born: Samuel Augustus Barnett; 8 February 1844 Bristol, England, UK
- Died: 17 June 1913 (aged 69) Hove, Sussex, England, UK
- Spouse: Dame Henrietta Barnett
- Occupation: Priest, humanitarian

Samuel Augustus Barnett (8 February 1844 – 17 June 1913) was a Church of England cleric and social reformer who was particularly associated with the establishment of the first university settlement, Toynbee Hall, in east London in 1884. He is often referred to as Canon Barnett, having served as Canon of Westminster Abbey from 1906 until his death.

== Early life ==
Samuel Augustus Barnett was born in Bristol, the elder son of Francis Augustus Barnett, an iron manufacturer. After a private education by tutors he entered Wadham College, Oxford, in 1862, leaving in 1866, whereafter he visited the United States. In the following year he was ordained as a deacon and became the curate of St Mary's, Bryanston Square before being ordained as a priest in 1868.

In 1873, he married Henrietta Octavia Weston Rowland (1851–1936), heiress, social reformer and author, later Dame Henrietta Barnett, DBE, who had been a co-worker of Octavia Hill. Both were social reformers and philanthropists with broad cultural interests. Later that year, the Barnetts moved to the impoverished Whitechapel parish of St. Jude's intent on improving social conditions in one of London's worst slums.

== Social reform ==
The East End area was notorious for its squalor and overcrowded housing conditions, as well as prostitution and other criminal activities. The Barnetts worked hard for the poor of their parish—opening evening schools for adults, providing them with music and entertainment, and serving on the local board of guardians and on the managing committees of schools. Barnett discouraged outdoor relief believing it fostered the pauperisation of the neighbourhood. At the same time, the Barnetts helped improve conditions of indoor relief, and coordinated the various charities by co-operation with the Charity Organization Society and the parish board of guardians.

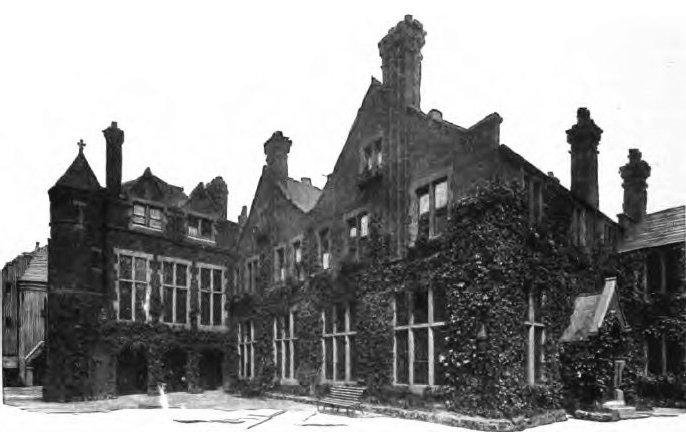
Toynbee Hall 1902

In 1875 Balliol historian Arnold Toynbee paid the first of many visits to Whitechapel. In 1877, Barnett, who kept in constant touch with Oxford, formed a small committee, over which he presided, to consider the organisation of university extension in London. His chief assistants were Leonard Montefiore, a young Oxford man, and Frederick Rogers, a member of the Vellum (Account Book) Binders' Trade Society.

The committee received influential support, and in October four courses of lectures, one by Dr Samuel Rawson Gardiner on English history, were given in Whitechapel. The Barnetts were associated with the foundation of the East End Dwellings Company, which built many model dwellings in the East End from 1888, with the establishment of the Children's Country Holiday Fund (1884) and the annual loan exhibitions of fine art at the Whitechapel gallery.

== University settlements ==
In 1884 an article by Henrietta Barnett in Nineteenth Century discussed the question of university settlements – places where richer students could live alongside, learn about and contribute to the welfare of much poorer people – in Barnett's words: 'to learn as much as to teach; to receive as much to give'. This resulted in the formation of the University Settlements Association. Toynbee Hall, named after the recently deceased historian Arnold Toynbee, was built shortly afterwards, and Barnett became its first Warden. In 1888 American reformer Jane Addams visited the settlement, and was inspired to create similar facilities in the United States—the first Hull House opening in Chicago a year later.

Barnett was a select preacher at Oxford (1895–97), and at Cambridge in 1900. In 1893 he received a canonry in Bristol Cathedral, but retained his wardenship of Toynbee Hall, while relinquishing the living of St. Jude's. In June 1906 he was given a canonry at Westminster, and when in December he resigned the wardenship of Toynbee Hall the position of president was created so that he might retain his home there.

== Hampstead Garden Suburb ==
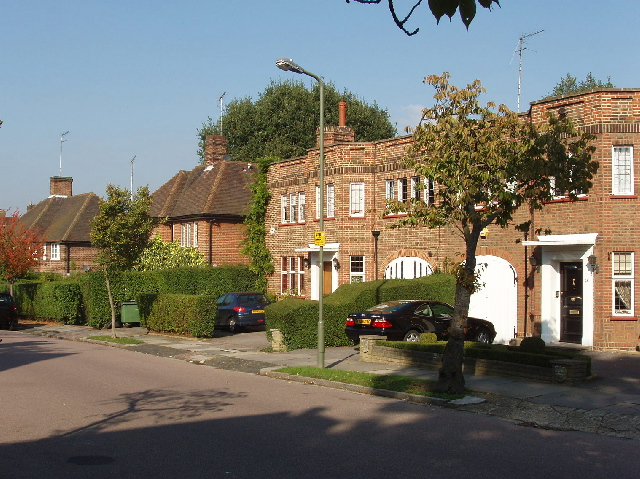
Litchfield Way, Hampstead Garden Suburb

The Barnetts also became known for their involvement in the Hampstead Garden Suburb. This arose after the activist couple acquired a weekend home at Spaniard's End in the Hampstead area of north-west London. The Barnetts worked to protect part of nearby Hampstead Heath from development by Eton College, as well as beginning in 1904 established trusts which bought 243 acres of land along the newly opened Northern line extension to Golders Green. Henrietta Barnett broke ground for the development on her 56th birthday, and while it never was completed to the plan of architects Raymond Unwin and Sir Edwin Lutyens, it achieved worldwide acclaim.

== Westminster Abbey ==
In 1906 Barnett moved from Canon of Bristol Cathedral to Canon of Westminster Abbey. At the coronation of King George V in 1911, Barnett's role was to carry the royal orb.

In 1913 he was elevated to Sub-Dean. His health had begun to fail, suffering several heart attacks prior to the coronation and one after. In his final days he suffered greatly from insomnia. A memorial to his memory lies on the north aisle of the Choir.

== Legacy ==
Samuel Barnett died in 1913 at 69 Kings Esplanade in Hove, and is buried with his wife in the churchyard at St Helen's Church, Hangleton, East Sussex.

As a memorial, his friend Sir Alfred Yarrow dedicated a charitable building in Hampstead Garden Suburb in his name in 1916: the Barnett Homestead. A Greater London Council blue plaque unveiled in 1983 on Heath End House on Spaniards Road, Hampstead commemorates Barnett and his wife. In 1914, Henrietta Barnett founded Barnett House at Oxford in his memory, and it became the Department of Social Policy and Intervention, University of Oxford. There is a Samuel Barnett Close in Filwood Park, Bristol.

The Barnetts jointly wrote Practicable Socialism (1888; 2nd ed. 1894).

Samuel is remembered (with Henrietta) in the Church of England with a commemoration on 17 June.

== Published work ==
- Barnett, Samuel Augustus; Barnett, Henrietta Rowland (1888). Practicable Socialism: Essays on Social Reform (1st ed.). London: Longmans, Green & Co.
  - Barnett, Samuel Augustus; Barnett, Henrietta Rowland (1895). Practicable Socialism: Essays on Social Reform (2nd ed.). London: Longmans, Green & Co.
  - Barnett, Samuel Augustus; Barnett, Henrietta Rowland (1915). Practicable Socialism: Essays on Social Reform (New Series ed.). London: Longmans, Green & Co.
- Barnett, Samuel Augustus; Barnett, Henrietta Rowland (1909). Towards Social Reform. London: T. Fisher Unwin.
