= William Coxen =

British merchant and politician (1867–1946)

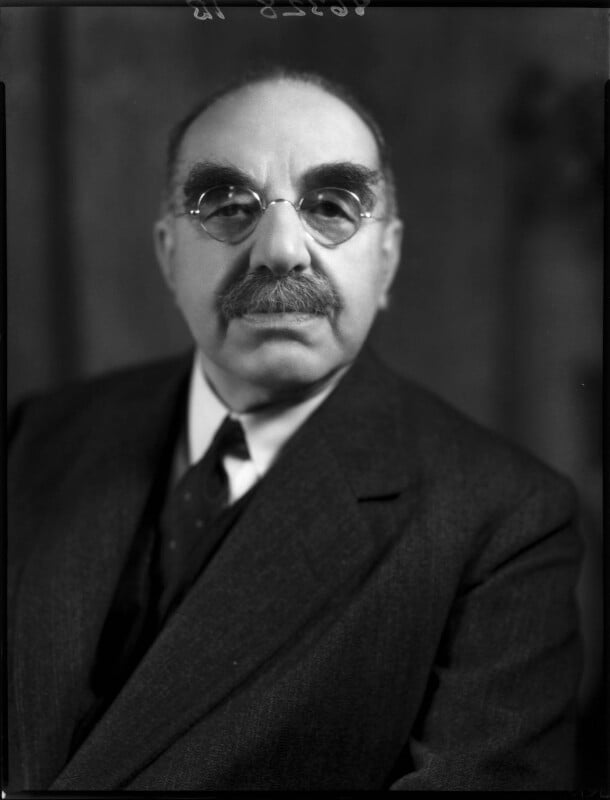
Coxen in 1939

Major Sir William George Coxen, 1st Baronet (23 March 1867 – 7 April 1946) was a British merchant and politician.

Coxen was born in Southwark, the eldest child of George Nickels Coxen and Fanny Luxton, of Newington, London. He was educated at Ongar Grammar School in Essex and at King's College London. During the First World War, he served as Commanding Officer of the 4th Battalion of the London Volunteer Rifles. After the war he was Mayor of Holborn between 1919 and 1920, Chairman of the Joint Industrial Council for the London District between 1920 and 1922, an Alderman of London, Sheriff of the City of London between 1928 and 1929 and Lord Mayor of London between 1939 and 1940. He was also the Treasurer of the Royal National Orthopaedic Hospital and a Trustee for the Metropolitan Nursing Association He was knighted in 1929 and created a baronet, of Seal in the County of Kent, in 1941.

Coxen married Kathleen Alice Doncaster in 1912. They had no children. He died in Seal, Kent, aged 69, when the baronetcy became extinct.

Honorary titles
Preceded by Sir Frank Bowater	Lord Mayor of London; 1939–1940	Succeeded by Sir George Wilkinson, 1st Baronet
Baronetage of the United Kingdom
New creation	Baronet (of Seal); 1941–1946	Extinct
