= Barnett Homestead =

Building in the London Borough of Barnet, England

Coordinates: 51.5864°N 0.1933°W

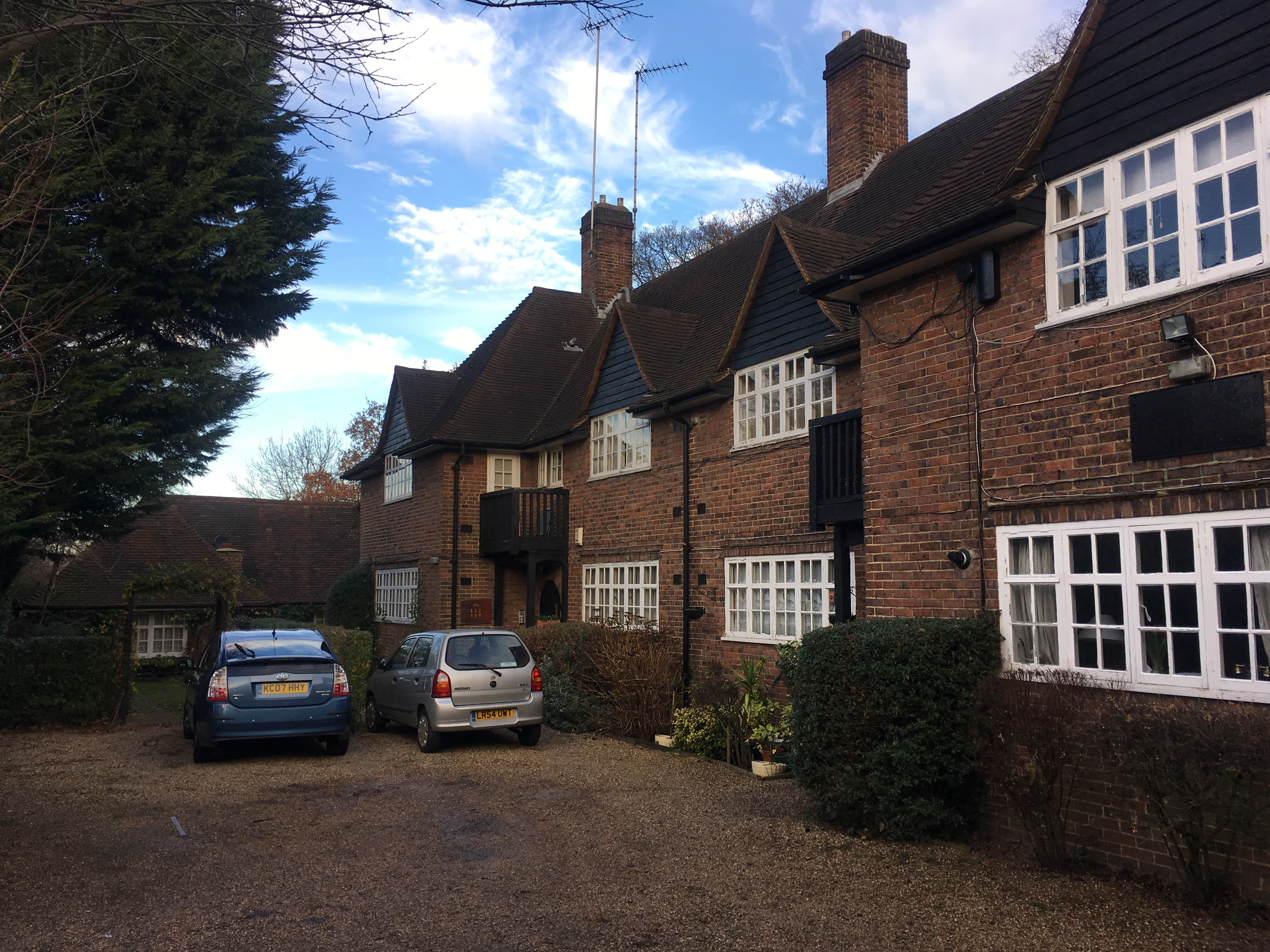
Barnett Homestead

The Barnett Homestead is a grade II listed building in Erskine Hill, Hampstead Garden Suburb, in north London, England. Designed by architect John Soutar, the building comprises 12 apartments intended for soldiers' widows and their children, and its construction was funded by shipbuilder and philanthropist Sir Alfred Yarrow in 1916. The building was given its name as a memorial to clergyman and social reformer Samuel Augustus Barnett, who was a friend of Yarrow's. It was listed in November 1996.

The building is symmetrically designed in a Georgian style, though Soutar adopted a cottage vernacular with dormer windows. A metal plaque on the west face of the south wing bears the inscription:

"These cottages were built by Sir Alfred Yarrow Baronet out of his great respect for and in affectionate memory of his friend Canon S. A. Barnett, whose life was spent in assisting all with whom he came in contact to become both nobler and happier."

Barnett was married to Henrietta Barnett, who founded The institute (later renamed Henrietta Barnett School) nearby in 1911.
