= List of awards and nominations received by Damian Lewis =

List of Damian Lewis awards
- Damian Lewis
Award	Wins	Nominations
Biarritz International Festival of Audiovisual Programming	1	1
Dorian Awards	1	1
Critics' Choice Television Awards	0	2
Emmy Awards	1	3
Golden Globe Awards	1	4
Gotham Awards	0	1
Satellite Awards	1	2
Screen Actors Guild Awards	0	1
Overall	5	13

The following is a list of awards and nominations received by Damian Lewis throughout his career.

== By award ==
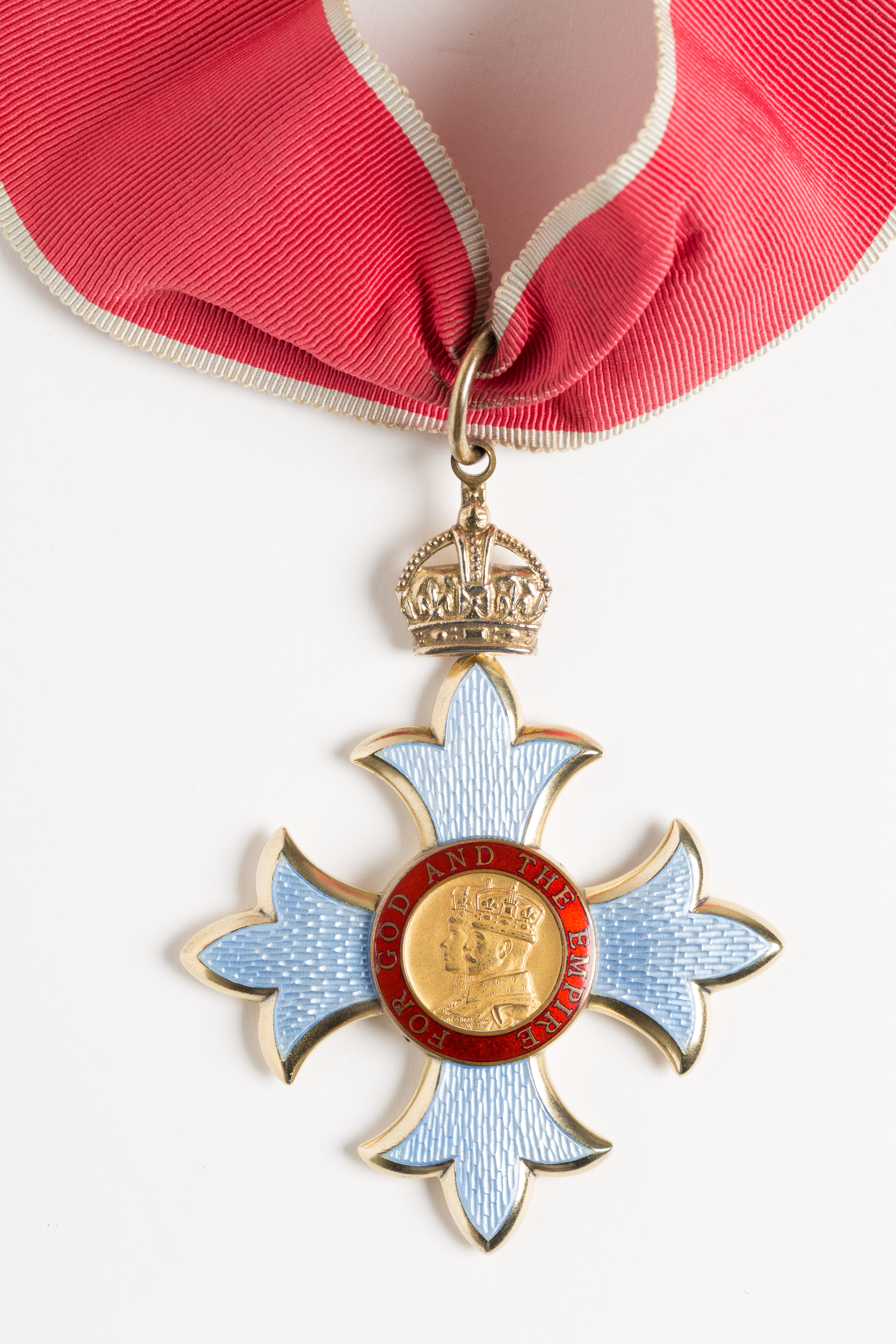
CBE neck decoration

=== Biarritz International Festival of Audiovisual Programming ===
==== Television awards ====
#	Year	Season	Category	Title	Result	Lost to
1	2001	—N/a	Best Actor – Series and Serials	Band of Brothers	Won	—N/a

=== Critics' Choice Television Awards ===
#	Year	Season	Category	Title	Result	Lost to
1	2012	1	Best Actor in a Drama Series	Homeland	Nominated	Bryan Cranston (Breaking Bad)
2	2013	2	Best Actor in a Drama Series	Homeland	Nominated	Bryan Cranston (Breaking Bad)

=== Emmy Awards ===
#	Year	Season	Category	Title	Result	Lost to
1	2012	1	Outstanding Lead Actor in a Drama Series	Homeland	Won	—N/a
2	2013	2	Outstanding Lead Actor in a Drama Series	Homeland	Nominated	Jeff Daniels (The Newsroom)
3	2015	—N/a	Outstanding Supporting Actor in a Limited Series or a Movie	Wolf Hall	Nominated	Bill Murray (Olive Kitteridge)

=== Golden Globe Awards ===
==== Television awards ====
#	Year	Season	Category	Title	Result	Lost to
1	2002	—N/a	Best Actor – Miniseries or Television Film	Band of Brothers	Nominated	James Franco (James Dean)
2	2012	1	Best Actor – Television Series Drama	Homeland	Nominated	Kelsey Grammer (Boss)
3	2013	2	Best Actor – Television Series Drama	Homeland	Won	—N/a
4	2015	—N/a	Best Supporting Actor – Series, Miniseries or Television Film	Wolf Hall	Nominated	Christian Slater (Mr. Robot)

=== Gotham Awards ===
==== Film awards ====
#	Year	Category	Title	Result	Lost to
1	2005	Breakthrough Actor	Keane	Nominated	Amy Adams (Junebug)

=== Satellite Awards ===
==== Television awards ====
#	Year	Season	Category	Title	Result	Lost to
1	2002	—N/a	Best Actor – Miniseries or Television Film	Band of Brothers	Nominated	Richard Dreyfuss (The Day Reagan Was Shot)

=== Screen Actors Guild Awards ===
==== Television awards ====
#	Year	Season	Category	Title	Result	Lost to
1	2013	2	Outstanding Performance by a Male Actor in a Drama Series	Homeland	Nominated	Bryan Cranston (Breaking Bad)

== By film or TV series ==
Year	Award	Category	Result
Band of Brothers (2001)			1 Win, 3 Nominations
2002	Biarritz International Festival of Audiovisual Programming—Golden FIPA	Best Actor – Series and Serials	Won
2002	Golden Globe Award	Best Actor – Miniseries or Television Film	Nominated
2002	Satellite Award	Best Actor – Miniseries or Television Film	Nominated
Keane (2004)			0 Wins, 1 Nomination
2005	Gotham Awards	Breakthrough Actor	Nominated
Homeland (2011–present)			2 Wins, 7 Nominations
2012 (Season 1)	Critics' Choice Television Award	Best Actor in a Drama Series	Nominated
2012 (Season 1)	Emmy Award	Outstanding Lead Actor in a Drama Series	Won
2012 (Season 1)	Golden Globe Award	Best Actor – Television Series Drama	Nominated
2013 (Season 2)	Critics' Choice Television Award	Best Actor in a Drama Series	Nominated
2013 (Season 2)	Emmy Award	Outstanding Lead Actor in a Drama Series	Nominated
2013 (Season 2)	Golden Globe Award	Best Actor – Television Series Drama	Won
2013 (Season 2)	Screen Actors Guild Awards	Outstanding Performance by a Male Actor in a Drama Series	Nominated
Totals			3 Wins, 11 Nominations
