= Noël Bowater =

Sir Noël Bowater Bt GBE MC KStJ
- Born: 25 December 1892
- Died: 22 January 1984 (aged 91)
- Allegiance: United Kingdom
- Service years: 1914–1919
- Conflicts: First World War
- Awards: Military Cross
- Spouse: Constance Bett

Sir Noël Vansittart Bowater, 2nd Baronet (25 December 1892 – 22 January 1984) was the 626th Lord Mayor of London from 1953 to 1954.

== Career ==
He was the eldest son of Sir Frank Bowater, 1st Baronet and his wife, Ethel Anita (née Fryar), and educated at Rugby School, Rugby, Warwickshire.

He fought in the First World War between 1914 and 1919, being awarded the Military Cross in 1917. After the war, he was invested as a Knight Commander of the Order of the Polar Star of Sweden, decorated with the award of the Order of Menelik II of Ethiopia, and invested as a Knight of the Most Venerable Order of the Hospital of Saint John of Jerusalem (KStJ).

=== Bowater Paper Corporation ===
Bowater became a vice-chairman of Bowater Paper Corporation.

=== Lord Mayor of London ===
He succeeded his father to the title of 2nd Baronet Bowater, of Friston, Suffolk (U.K., 1939) on 10 November 1947 and held the office of Sheriff of the City of London in 1948 and Lord Mayor of London in 1953. The following year he was invested as a Knight Grand Cross (GBE) of the Order of the British Empire and became Master of the Worshipful Company of Vintners. He also held the office of Lord Lieutenant of the City of London.

== Marriage and issue ==
On 1 February 1921, he married Constance Bett (died 27 May 1993), daughter of David Gordon Bett, of Woodbridge, Suffolk, and they had three children.

Bowater died on 22 January 1984. He was succeeded by his son, Euan, as the third baronet.

== Sources ==
- Charles Mosley, editor, Burke's Peerage, Baronetage & Knightage, 107th edition, 3 volumes (Wilmington, Delaware, U.S.A.: Burke's Peerage (Genealogical Books) Ltd, 2003), volume 1, pages 456 and 457.

Political offices
Preceded by Rupert De la Bère	Lord Mayor of London; 1953–1954	Succeeded by Seymour Howard
Baronetage of the United Kingdom
Preceded by Frank Bowater	Baronet (of Friston); 1947–1984	Succeeded by Euan Bowater
