= Alexis Bowater =

British television journalist and presenter

Alexis Bowater OBE
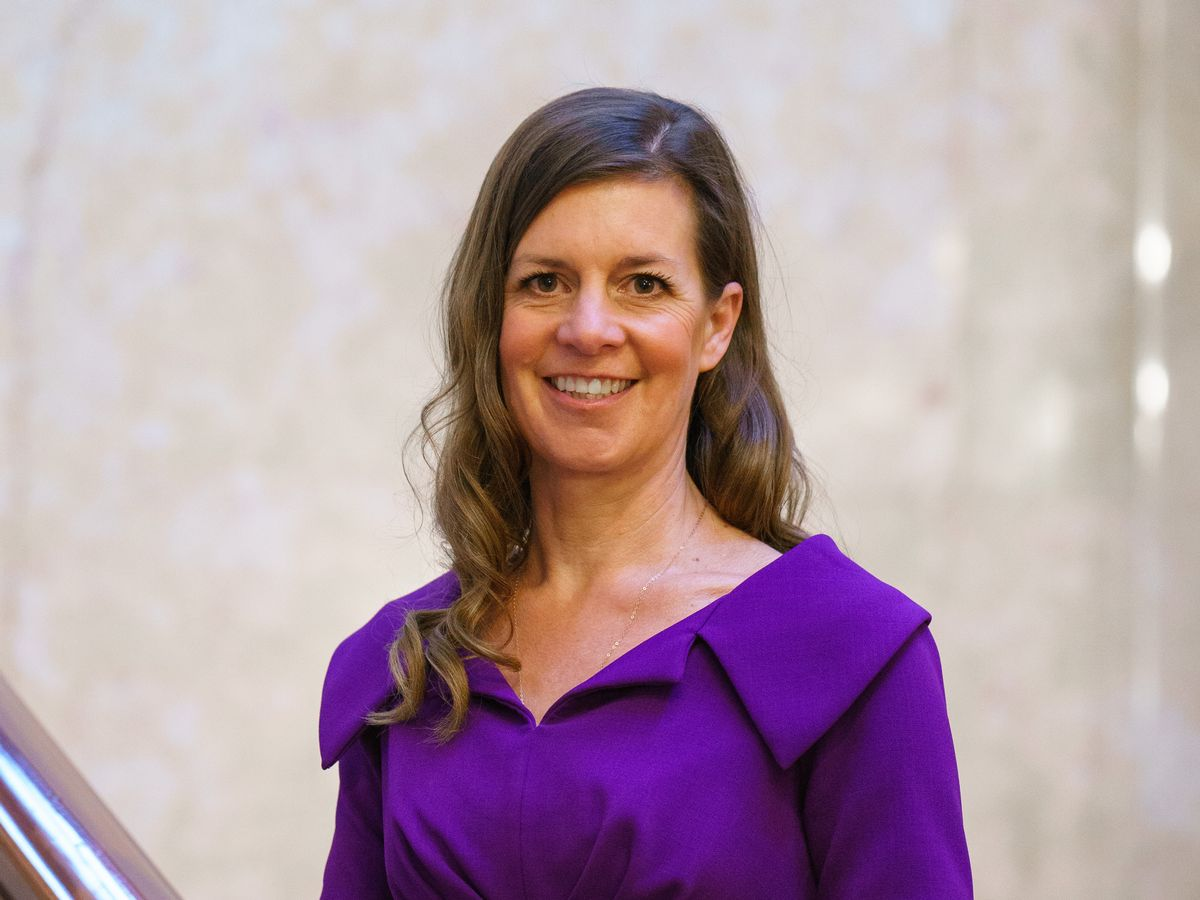
- Born: Alexis Bowater; Chagford, Devon, United Kingdom
- Occupations: Newsreader, journalist
- Notable credit: Westcountry Live
- Children: 2

Alexis Bowater OBE is a Devon-born British newsreader (first known for her career as a news presenter on Westcountry Live), journalist and women's campaigner. In response to her stalking experience whilst main anchor at ITV Westcountry, she became the Chief Executive of the Network for Surviving Stalking and then campaigned for the laws to be changed in the UK and Europe. After stepping down as CEO, she set up her own communications and consultancy agency Bowater Communications.

Bowater has been involved with community interest companies and projects including Beach Schools South West, The Venus Awards, South West Women in Business and from May 2022, the West Country Women Awards.

Bowater was appointed Officer of the Order of the British Empire (OBE) in the 2022 Birthday Honours for services to the safety and equality of women.

== Early life ==
The daughter of Sir Euan, 3rd Baronet Bowater and Lady Bowater, Bowater was born and brought up in Chagford, Devon. She graduated from the University of Newcastle upon Tyne with a bachelor's degree in English and Geography. She graduated from Bristol University with an MSc in International Politics, Economics and Social Policy.

Bowater has two children.

== Career ==
=== News and journalism ===
Bowater became a reporter in 1993 for the Express & Echo newspaper in Exeter.

She joined Westcountry Television (ITV Westcountry) in 1995 as a newsroom researcher, before becoming a presenter/producer for Westcountry Live opt-out bulletins during GMTV, alongside reporting duties.

She later became a presenter/producer for late night and weekend bulletins, and an anchor for the main evening programme, Westcountry Live, before becoming a full-time main anchor in 2003. She has also contributed to a number of non-news regional programmes for Westcountry including output for the station's Britain on the Move and People's Millions campaigns. Bowater left the station in February 2009 when ITV Westcountry merged with ITV West, signalling the end of Westcountry Live.

Also a Royal Television Society judge, she supports and recognises the skills and commitment of those working in the UK media industry.

=== Stalking and protections ===
While pregnant in 2006 and 2008, Bowater was cyber-stalked by Alexander Reeve, 24, who sent her 26 messages in one five-month period. Reeve, from Looe, Cornwall, pleaded guilty at Plymouth Crown Court to five counts of communicating false information with intent and causing fear of violence. He also admitted twice communicating false information that a bomb was in the ITV studios at Language Science Park. He was sentenced to four years and one month in jail, and received a lifetime restraining order.

Bowater subsequently became the Chief Executive for the Network for Surviving Stalking.

In April 2010, the NSS, in collaboration with the Suzy Lamplugh Trust and Protection Against Stalking, launched the world's first National Stalking Helpline.

Bowater stepped down as CEO of NSS after successfully campaigning to have stalking included in The Istanbul Convention to combat Violence Against Women and Girls. The Council of Europe Convention on preventing and combating violence against women and domestic violence entered force on 1 August 2014. The new stalking laws to protect victims in the UK came into force on 25 November 2012.

From 2018 she worked with MP Sarah Wollaston on the Stalking Protection Orders which became law in the UK in January 2020.

=== Communications ===
Bowater is still a working journalist and campaigner.

Since March 2013 she has been with Bowater Communications, a bespoke consultancy service advising on media strategy including PR, media training, presentation skills, strategic comms, campaigning, video production, copywriting, networking, social media management, website creation and speechwriting services.

=== Projects and campaigns ===
In 2018-2019, Bowater was the Project Lead for the Nancy Astor Statue Campaign, successfully crowdfunding more than £140,000 and gaining worldwide coverage for the project. The statue, the first of the first female MP to sit in the House of Commons, was unveiled on Plymouth Hoe on 28 November 2019, exactly 100 years after her landslide victory, by the only living female prime minister of the UK, Theresa May. UK Prime Minister Boris Johnson attended the post-unveiling event to congratulate the Astor Statue Committee on their historic achievement.

== Community organisations ==
Bowater launched an outdoor education company, Beach Schools South West CIC, taking children out of the classroom and onto the beach for curriculum-linked learning.

Bowater was a Regional Director of the Venus Awards, which at the time were high profile regional events. They rewarded women in local business for the outstanding contribution they made to their local communities. Their objective was to recognise female owned and female friendly businesses. The Venus Awards started in Dorset in 2009 and were developed into a number of regional events. In each region these events are fast becoming known as the social and networking event of the business calendar. Bowater held responsibility for the Devon and Cornwall regions.

Bowater still supports women in business, and was the co-founder and director of South West Women in Business. Pre-COVID Business Networking was available at in Exeter, Plymouth, Truro and Taunton and was free to attend. The organisation was a registered community interest company and was run by four local women.

As part of South West Women in Business CIC, Bowater hosted the annual International Women's Day conference in Plymouth from 2017 onwards.

Following on from Bowater's experience supporting local women in business through previous endeavours, she and her co-director Tess Stuber launched the independent West Country Women Awards in June 2022.
