= Ministry of Health Act 1919 =

Act of the Parliament of the United Kingdom

Ministry of Health Act 1919 (Note: Section 11(1).)
- Act of Parliament
- Parliament of the United Kingdom
- Long title: An Act to establish a Ministry of Health to exercise in England and Wales powers with respect to Health and Local Government, and confer upon the Chief Secretary certain powers with respect to Health in Ireland, and for purposes connected therewith.
- Citation: 9 & 10 Geo. 5. c. 19
- Territorial extent: United Kingdom

Dates
- Royal assent: 3 June 1919
- Commencement
- Repealed: 1 March 2007
Other legislation
Amends	Local Government Board Act 1871; Light Railways Act 1896; National Insurance Act 1911
Amended by	National Health Insurance Act 1924; Public Health Act 1936; Public Health (London) Act 1936; Science and Technology Act 1965
Repealed by	National Health Service (Pre-consolidation Amendments) Order 2006

Status: Repealed

Text of statute as originally enacted

Revised text of statute as amended

The Ministry of Health Act 1919 (9 & 10 Geo. 5. c. 19) was an act of the Parliament of the United Kingdom that established a Ministry of Health in England and Wales and appointed the Chief Secretary as Minister of Health for Ireland.

It also established the Consultative Council on National Health Insurance, the Consultative Council on Medical and Allied Services, the Consultative Council on Local Health Administration and the Consultative Council on General Health Questions. Separate provision was made for consultative arrangements in Wales and Ireland.

Christopher Addison was the first minister appointed.

Its role was to 'take all such steps as may be desirable to secure the preparation, effective carrying out and co-ordination of measures conducive to the health of the people'.
