= Wilkinson baronets =

Baronetcy in the Baronetage of the United Kingdom

The Wilkinson Baronetcy, of Brook in Witley in the County of Surrey, is a title in the Baronetage of the United Kingdom. It was created on 8 December 1941 for George Wilkinson, Lord Mayor of London from 1940 to 1941.

== Wilkinson baronets, of Brook (1941) ==
- Sir George Henry Wilkinson, 1st Baronet (1885–1967)
- Sir (Leonard) David Wilkinson, 2nd Baronet (1920–1972)
- Sir (David) Graham Brook Wilkinson, 3rd Baronet (born 1947)

There is no heir to the baronetcy.

== Arms ==
Coat of arms of Wilkinson baronets
Crest Issuant from a chaplet of roses Argent barbed and seeded Proper a demi-unicorn Or. Escutcheon Quarterly Argent and Vair Sable and Or a cross Gules in the 1st & 4th quarters a lion rampant of the fourth on a chief also of the fourth three mullets of the third. Motto Honorem Custode
