= Eric Vansittart Bowater =

English businessman

Sir Eric Vansittart Bowater, FRSA (16 January 1895 – 30 August 1962), was an English businessman, who took the family firm Bowater from a paper merchant to the world's largest paper products company in his 40 years as its CEO and chairman.

== Early life ==
The son of Sir Frederick W. Bowater, KBE, and Dame Alice Bowater, he served with the Royal Artillery from 1913. Badly wounded at the Battle of Passchendaele in 1917, and decorated Legion of Honour, he was subsequently pensioned off from the British Army.

== Career ==
After a period of convalescence, he joined the family business of W.V. Bowater and Sons in 1919, taking charge of project management for construction of the company's first paper mill at Northfleet on the south side of the Thames estuary near Gravesend, Kent. After ensuring that the mill reached full production in 1925, he joined the company board and became Chief Executive in 1927.

Expanding the firm quickly, he sold part of the business to Lord Rothermere, using the funds to double production at Northfleet. He then reached agreement with both Lord Rothermere and Lord Beaverbrook to invest directly in the build of a new paper mill at Ellesmere Port on the River Mersey close to Liverpool, with the mill's profits ensured through long-term supply agreements with his investors. However, the 1930s recession brought about a need by the investors for cash injections into their own business, resulting by the early 1930s in the company again being wholly family owned. Bowater then oversaw an international expansion of the business, with offices and mills in Canada, the United States and Australia.

Seconded to the Ministry of Aircraft Production by his friend Lord Beaverbrook, he was made a Director-General and placed in charge of the salvage of all downed aircraft. Bowater was subsequently knighted in 1944 for his services to the war effort.

Returning to the family business in 1945, he oversaw its development into six lines of business. The firm grew into the world's leading supplier of paper products, with total assets of £194,891,000 and annual sales of 2,422,000 long tons of paper, pulp and other products valued at £150,818,000. A period of international expansion began in 1953, which included investments in North America in the mid-late 1950s and the acquisition of manufacturers in continental Europe in 1959-60. Company assets at the time of Bowater's death in 1962 totalled close to £200 million.

He was a Fellow of the Royal Society of Arts.

== Personal life ==
He married Blanche Murre de Ville, with whom he had one daughter. After their divorce, he married, secondly, to Margaret Vivian Perkins, on 23 June 1937. They remained married until his death in 1962, and with whom he had a daughter and a son.

His main home was Dene Place in West Horsley, Surrey (now converted into a Bupa nursing home), which on top of its extensive ornamental gardens, then housed a 300 acres (120 ha) dairy farm based around a herd of pedigree Guernsey cattle. He also owned extensive lands in Newfoundland, Canada, including: a house in Corner Brook; a fishing lodge on the Serpentine River; and a farm on the banks of the Humber River, where he raised Ayrshire cattle. He also had homes in Riceville, Tennessee, and in Australia.

He died at his home in Surrey on 30 August 1962.
