= Sir George Wilkinson, 1st Baronet =

Lord Mayor of London from 1940-1941

Sir George Henry Wilkinson, 1st Baronet, (20 July 1885 – 27 June 1967) was Lord Mayor of London for 1940 to 1941.

== Arms ==
Coat of arms of Sir George Wilkinson, 1st Baronet
| Crest Issuant from a chaplet of roses Argent barbed and seeded Proper a demi-unicorn Or. Escutcheon Quarterly Argent and Vair Sable and Or a cross Gules in the 1st & 4th quarters a lion rampant of the fourth on a chief also of the fourth three mullets of the third. Motto Honorem Custode |

== See also ==
- Wilkinson baronets
