= Olaus Johnsen =

British flying ace

Olaus Charles Wilhelm Johnsen
- Born: 25 October 1889; Bromley, London, England
- Died: 20 April 1960 (aged 70)
- Burial place: St. Mary's Church, Balcombe, West Sussex, England
- Military career
- Allegiance: United Kingdom
- Branch: British Army; Royal Air Force
- Service years: 1913–1919
- Rank: Captain
- Units: 4th London (Howitzer) Brigade, Royal Field Artillery; No. 98 Squadron RAF
- Conflicts: World War I; Western Front
- Awards: Distinguished Flying Cross

Olaus Charles Wilhelm Johnsen (Note: Several sources misspell his first name as Olans, the result of a misprint in the citation for his DFC in the London Gazette, which elsewhere renders it correctly as Olaus. His gravestone has William Johnsen, apparently the name he was known by.) DFC (25 October 1889 – 20 April 1960) was a British flying ace of the First World War credited with five aerial victories.

== Biography ==
=== Family background ===
Johnsen was born in Bromley, Hertfordshire, the son of Wilhelm Martin and Eliza Johnsen.

=== Military service ===
Johnsen was commissioned as a supernumerary second lieutenant in the 4th London (Howitzer) Brigade, Royal Field Artillery, a unit of the Territorial Force, on 17 May 1913, and was absorbed into the establishment on 17 November. He was promoted to lieutenant on 1 July 1914, and to captain on 29 April 1917, with precedence from 1 June 1916.

Johnsen was seconded to the Royal Flying Corps, in which he was appointed a flying officer on 7 July 1917, with the rank of lieutenant (honorary captain). He was posted to No. 98 Squadron RFC, flying the DH.9 two-seater day-bomber. On 27 June 1918 he was appointed a temporary captain. (Note: The rank of temporary captain usually denoted an appointment as a flight commander.)

Johnsen's first victory came on 11 July 1918, by driving down out of control a Pfalz D.III over Don. On 18 July he destroyed an Albatros D.V over Fère-en-Tardenois, and on 20 July shot down a Fokker Dr.I in flames. For these first three victories he flew with observer Captain G. H. Whitfield. His fourth victory came on 30 August, driving down a Fokker D.VII over Somain, with observer 2nd Lieutenant A. H. Fuller, and he repeated this feat for his fifth and final victory on 16 September over Oisy, with observer 2nd Lieutenant C. H. Thompson.

Johnsen was subsequently awarded the Distinguished Flying Cross, which was gazetted on 7 February 1919. His citation read:

Lieutenant (Acting-Captain) Olans [sic] Charles William Johnsen.

"A brilliant leader and gallant fighter. On 1st October this officer led a bombing formation against a railway junction, and, owing to his skilful leadership, serious damage was caused. Three big explosions occurred in the station, wrecking a number of trucks, and a factory nearby was demolished. He has taken part in thirty-four raids, eighteen of which he has led. He has accounted for five enemy aeroplanes."

He received his medal from the King at Buckingham Palace on 24 July 1919.

Johnsen relinquished his temporary rank of captain on 3 December 1918, and was transferred to the unemployed list of the RAF on 2 January 1919. He resigned his army commission in the 4th London Brigade on 17 November 1920, but retained the rank of captain.

=== Personal life ===
On 5 February 1916 Johnsen married Ethel May Bowater (1896–1990), the daughter of Major Sir Frank Henry Bowater, Bt. They had eight children, six boys and two girls.
