= Yarrow baronets =

Baronetcy in the Baronetage of the United Kingdom

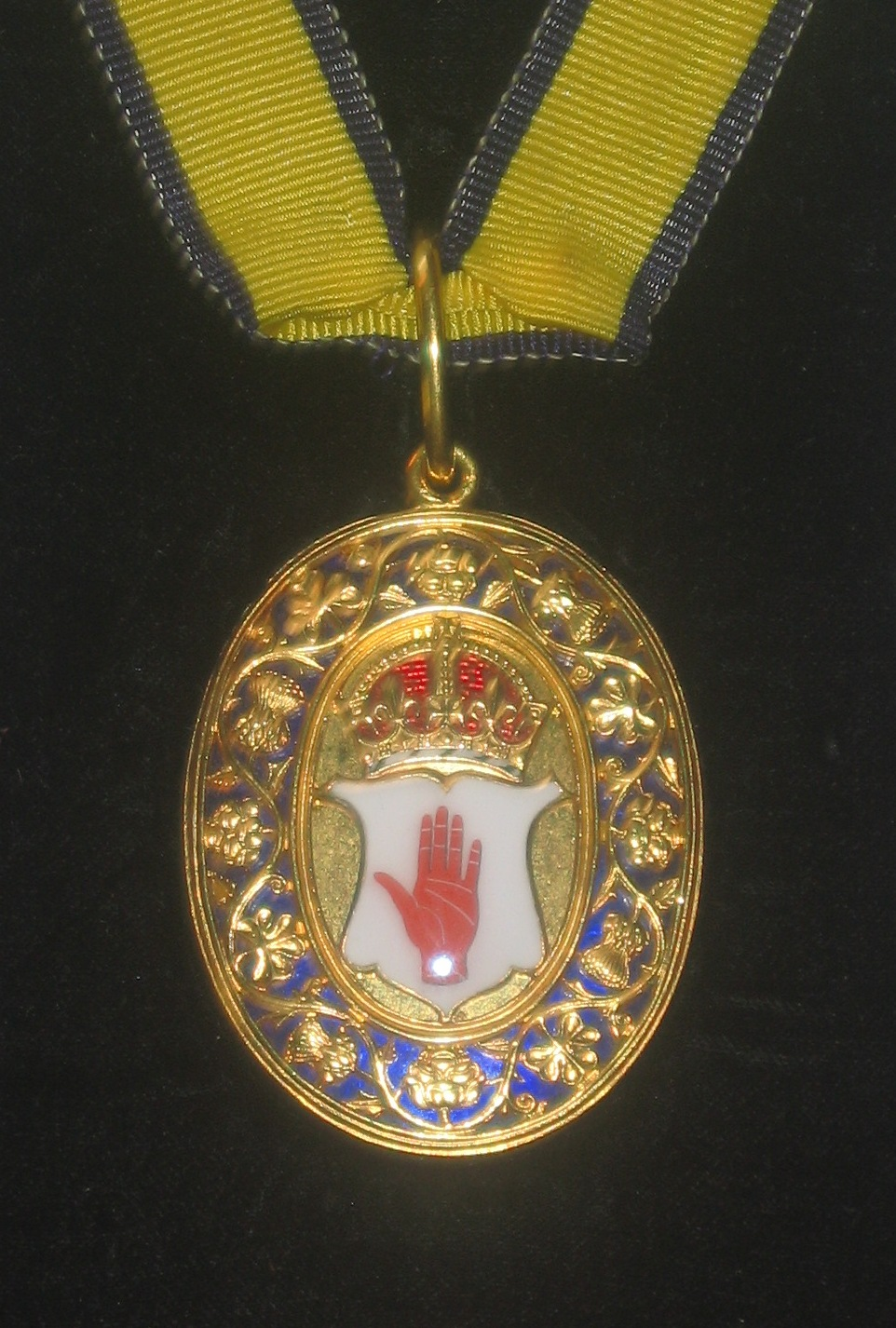
Insignia of Baronet

The Yarrow baronetcy, of Homestead, Hindhead, in Frensham in the County of Surrey, is a hereditary title in the Baronetage of the United Kingdom.

It was created by George V on 29 January 1916 for the shipbuilder and engineer Alfred Yarrow. He was founding Chairman of Yarrow & Co, shipbuilders, of the Isle of Dogs, London and later of Scotstoun, Glasgow.

Sir Eric Yarrow, the third baronet, was a businessman who has been appointed MBE and also served as a Deputy Lieutenant for Renfrewshire.

The actor Damian Lewis is the 1st baronet's great-great-grandson.

== Yarrow baronets, of Homestead (1916) ==
- Sir Alfred Fernandez Yarrow, 1st Baronet (1842–1932)
- Sir Harold Edgar Yarrow, 2nd Baronet (1884–1962)
- Sir Eric Grant Yarrow, 3rd Baronet (1920–2018)
  - Richard Grant Yarrow (1953–1987)
- Sir Ross Yarrow, 4th Baronet (born 1985)

== Arms ==
Coat of arms of Yarrow baronets

Crest
Above clouds Proper a swallow volant Argent holding in the beak a yarrow flower slipped also Proper.
Escutcheon
Azure in base on the sea Proper an ancient three-masted ship sailing to the sinister Argent in chief two swallows volant of the last each holding in the beak a harebell slipped also Proper.
Motto
Be Just And Fear Not
