= Harry Twyford =

Mayor of London (1937-1938)

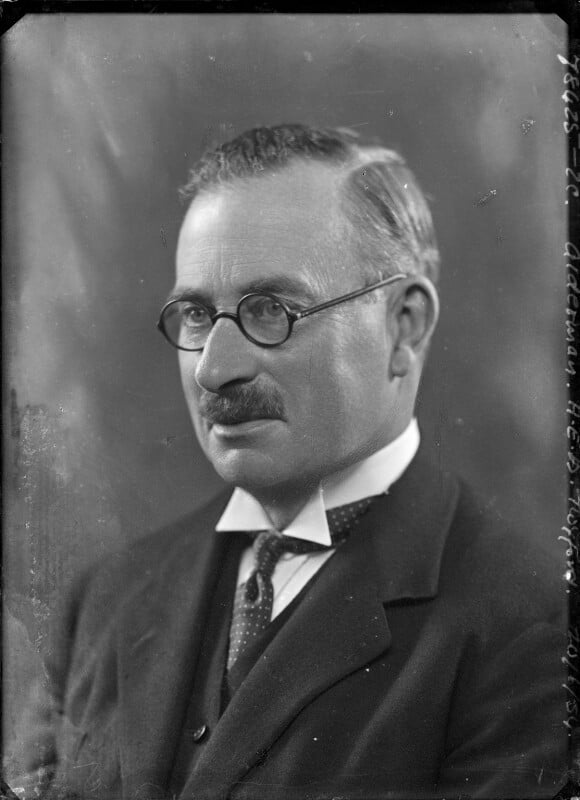
Twyford in 1934

Sir Harry Edward Augustus Twyford (1870 – 10 January 1967) was a British businessman who was Lord Mayor of London from 1937 to 1938.

He was a descendant of Sir Nicholas Twyford, Lord of Mayor in 1388, who was present at the killing of Wat Tyler in 1381.
