= Charles Trinder =

British businessman; Lord Mayor of London from 1968 to 1969

Sir Arnold Charles Trinder (12 May 1906 – 25 December 1989) was a British businessman who was the Lord Mayor of London from 1968 to 1969.
