= Ian Bowater =

Lord Mayor of London from 1969 to 1970

Sir Ian Bowater
- Bowater in 1967

Lord Mayor of London
- In office 1969–1970
- Preceded by: Charles Trinder
- Succeeded by: Peter Studd

Personal details
- Born: 16 December 1904
- Died: 1 October 1982 (aged 77)
- Parent: Sir Frank Bowater, 1st Baronet (father)
- Education: Eton College; Magdalen College, Oxford

Military service
- Allegiance: United Kingdom
- Branch/service: Territorial Army
- Rank: Lieutenant-Colonel
- Unit: Royal Artillery
- Battles/wars: Second World War
- Awards: Distinguished Service Order; Territorial Decoration

Lieutenant-Colonel Sir Ian Frank Bowater (16 December 1904 – 1 October 1982) served as Lord Mayor of London from 1969 to 1970.

== Career ==
The youngest son of Sir Frank Bowater, 1st Baronet (Lord Mayor from 1938 to 1939), and Ethel Anita Fryar, he was educated at Eton, then Magdalen College, Oxford.

Just before the onset of war in 1939, Bowater was appointed one of HM Lieutenants of the City of London. During the Second World War, he served with distinction reaching the rank of lieutenant colonel in the service of the Royal Artillery (Territorial Army), for which he was decorated with the awards of the Distinguished Service Order (DSO) in 1945 and the Territorial Decoration (TD). He later became Sheriff of the City of London in 1965 and was invested as a Knight Bachelor in 1967.

Bowater later served as Lord Mayor of London between 1969 and 1970 and was invested as an Knight of the Most Venerable Order of the Hospital of Saint John of Jerusalem (KStJ) and as a Knight Grand Cross of the Order of the British Empire (GBE) in 1970. In 1966, Bowater received the Grand Decoration of Honour in Silver for Services to the Republic of Austria. He also became chairman of Bowater Hotels.

== Marriage and issue ==
On 10 December 1927 Bowater married The Hon. Ursula Margaret Dawson, the daughter of the 1st Viscount Dawson of Penn. They had four children.

== Sources ==
- Charles Mosley, editor, Burke's Peerage, Baronetage & Knightage, 107th edition, 3 volumes (Wilmington, Delaware, U.S.: Burke's Peerage (Genealogical Books) Ltd, 2003), volume 1, page 456.

Civic offices
Preceded by Sir Charles Trinder	Lord Mayor of London; 1969–1970	Succeeded by Sir Peter Studd
