= Consultative Council on National Health Insurance =

The Consultative Council on National Health Insurance was established under the Ministry of Health Act 1919 along with the National Health Insurance Joint Committee.

Sir Thomas Neill was chair until 1924 and was knighted for his services in the 1920 New Year Honours In 1934 the chair was Mr. J. W. Shaw, of the Order of Druids Friendly Society.

Records of the Councils and their subcommittees are held in the National Archives.
