= David Yarrow =

Scottish fine-art photographer

- Born: 8 February 1966 (age 60); Glasgow, Scotland
- Occupation: Photographer / financier
- Title: Founder David Yarrow Photography
- Children: Two
- Father: Eric Yarrow
- Website: davidyarrow.photography

David Yarrow (born 8 February 1966) is a Scottish fine-art photographer, conservationist, philanthropist and author. The subjects of his photography include sport stars, world-renowned models, wildlife, indigenous communities and landscapes. He has collaborated with super models Cara Delevingne and Cindy Crawford. Since 2018, Yarrow's work has raised over $20m for philanthropic and conservation organisations. In 2021, his collaboration with Crawford raised over $5m for the American Family Children's Hospital. He is also known for his staged narrative series capturing the American Wild West. He currently lives in London.

== Early life ==
Yarrow is the son of Eric Yarrow, part of the Yarrow shipbuilding dynasty before serving as the chairman of Clydesdale Bank from 1985 to 1991.

He began his photographic career recording iconic sporting events and was named Young Scottish Photographer of the Year at the age of 20 whilst studying at Edinburgh University. In the same year (1986) he covered the World Cup in Mexico for The Times. His photo of Diego Maradona holding the trophy aloft was internationally syndicated.

== Career ==
After graduating from Edinburgh University, Yarrow pursued a career in finance. He spent 8 years working as an institutional stockbroker in UK equities, both in London and New York City. In 1993 Yarrow was appointed Director of Equities at Natwest Securities where he worked until leaving to found his London-based hedge fund, Clareville Capital in 1995.

Yarrow's passion and interest in photography remained constant throughout this period, which prompted Spear's magazine to liken him to James Boswell in an article that explored Yarrow's "double-life" as hedge fund manager and artist. In 2021, Yarrow has been focussing on his staged narrative shoots such as his Wild West series.

== Photography ==
His approach to photography is guided by Jim Richardson's assertion that "if you want to be a better photographer stand in front of more interesting stuff".

He has captured a diverse range of subjects and collaborators including the Dinka people of South Sudan, Diego Maradona, Cindy Crawford, Cara Delevingne and various wildlife around the world. When possible, Yarrow takes his photographs of dangerous wildlife using a remote-controlled camera, acknowledging that a photographer can achieve perspective by capturing shots that look up at the animal from the ground.

Yarrow uses an innovative technique to capture his shots. One of Yarrow's methods involves coating his camera casing in a variety of scents to entice dangerous animals towards his camera lens. These treatments have been used after research into identifying the most attractive and enticing smell for the animal in question.

=== Prints and exhibitions ===
Yarrow's work has been exhibited in London's Saatchi Gallery, the Phillip's Gallery and Christie's global headquarters (8 King Street).

His photographs have been auctioned at Sotheby's. On 19 May 2017, Yarrow's "Mankind" image was included in Sotheby's annual photography auction. The photograph sold for £60,000. A 2018 New York auction for "The Wolf of Main Street" fetched $100,000, 4 times the high estimate of $25,000. A 2018 London auction for "78 Degrees North" fetched £81,250, thus marking a new record. In 2019, edition 12/12 of the photograph "Africa" sold for $106,250. In 2019,"Old Testament" the photograph "Old Testament sold for $52,500 in a Sotheby's auction.

Solo Exhibitions:

- Storytelling, Maddox Gallery, London (October–November 2023)
- David Yarrow Gallery Space, Maddox Gallery, London (August 2024-April 2025)

=== Books ===
Nowhere (2007) is a 172-page selection of colour photographs of some of the world's most isolated locations.

Encounter (2013) is a compilation of 87 monochrome photographs of wildlife and indigenous communities, combined with Yarrow's narrative. The collective is a result of three years of trips to parts of the world that have largely escaped public overexposure.

Wild Encounters (2016) includes a foreword written by Prince William, Duke of Cambridge and was awarded Art Book of 2017 by Amazon. Yarrow's royalties from the book are being donated to Tusk Trust, a British charity that focuses on animal conservation in Africa.

David Yarrow (2019) is a 368-page photography monograph, it contains 150 images from the past two years. The book includes a foreword by global NFL player Tom Brady and an afterword by Cindy Crawford. All royalties from this book are being donated to conservation charities Tusk in the UK and WildAid in the US.

== Charity ==
Yarrow is the affiliated photographer for the African Conservation Charity Tusk Trust, a British organisation founded in 1990. Since November 2013, David Yarrow Photography has contributed over $1 million to help support Tusk's programmes and projects. Yarrow is also an Ambassador for Wild Ark, the Kevin Richardson Foundation, the African Community and Conservation Foundation, and Best Buddies.

Since 2018, Yarrow's work has raised over $20m for philanthropic and conservation organisations. In 2021, his collaboration with Cindy Crawford raised over $3m for the American Family Children's Hospital.

In 2020, he launched the #KoalaComeback Campaign to support the wildfire recovery efforts in Australia. The campaign raised over $1.4m and after the outbreak of COVID-19, he helped raise over £1m for the NHS by releasing a charity print, “Our Pride” with all proceeds going to HEROES.

In 2021, his collaboration with Cindy Crawford raised over $3m for the American Family Children's Hospital.

== Personal life ==
Yarrow married Jane Martin, a public relations director in 2000. The couple are now divorced. They have two children.

== Publications ==
- Nowhere (Clearview, 2007)
- Encounter (Clearview, 2013)
- Wild Encounters (Rizzoli, 2016)
- David Yarrow (Rizzoli, 2019)
