= Harold Yarrow =

British industrialist and shipbuilder

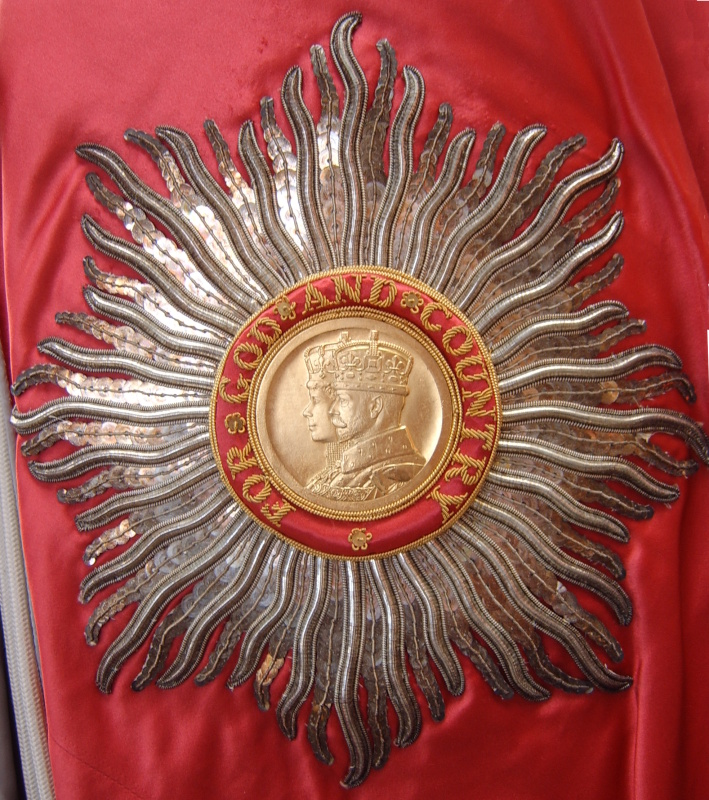
GBE insignia

Sir Harold Edgar Yarrow, 2nd Baronet, GBE FRS FRSE (11 August 1884 – 19 April 1962) was a British industrialist and shipbuilder. He developed Yarrow Shipbuilders as Chairman and Managing Director, as well as later serving as Chairman of Clydesdale Bank.

== Life ==
He was born on 11 August 1884 in London the first surviving son of Sir Alfred Yarrow 1st Bt, an English shipbuilder and founder of the shipping dynasty Yarrow Shipbuilders, and his wife, Minnie Florence Franklin.

He was educated at Bedford School. He succeeded as 2nd baronet upon his father's death in 1932.

Yarrow was chairman and managing director of Yarrow Shipbuilders for over forty years, diversifying the company and overseeing its move to the River Clyde.

He served as Chairman of the North of Scotland and Clydesdale Bank and, having been appointed a Commander of the Order of the British Empire (CBE) in the 1918 New Year Honours, he was promoted to Knight Grand Cross (GBE) in the 1958 New Year Honours, for advancing Scottish business interests.

He served two terms as President of the Institution of Engineers and Shipbuilders in Scotland, from 1921 to 1923 and from 1956 to 1957.

Sir Harold died at Overton, Kilmacolm, Renfrewshire on 19 April 1962, when he was succeeded by Eric Yarrow, his only son.

== Arms ==
Coat of arms of Harold Yarrow

Crest
Above clouds Proper a swallow volant Argent holding in the beak a yarrow flower slipped also Proper.
Escutcheon
Azure in base on the sea Proper an ancient three-masted ship sailing to the sinister Argent in chief two swallows volant of the last each holding in the beak a harebell slipped also Proper.
Motto
Be Just And Fear Not

Baronetage of the United Kingdom
Preceded by Alfred Fernandez Yarrow	Baronet (of Homestead, Surrey); 1932–1962	Succeeded by Eric Grant Yarrow
