= Alfred Yarrow =

British industrialist and shipbuilder (1842–1932)

Sir Alfred Yarrow Bt FRS
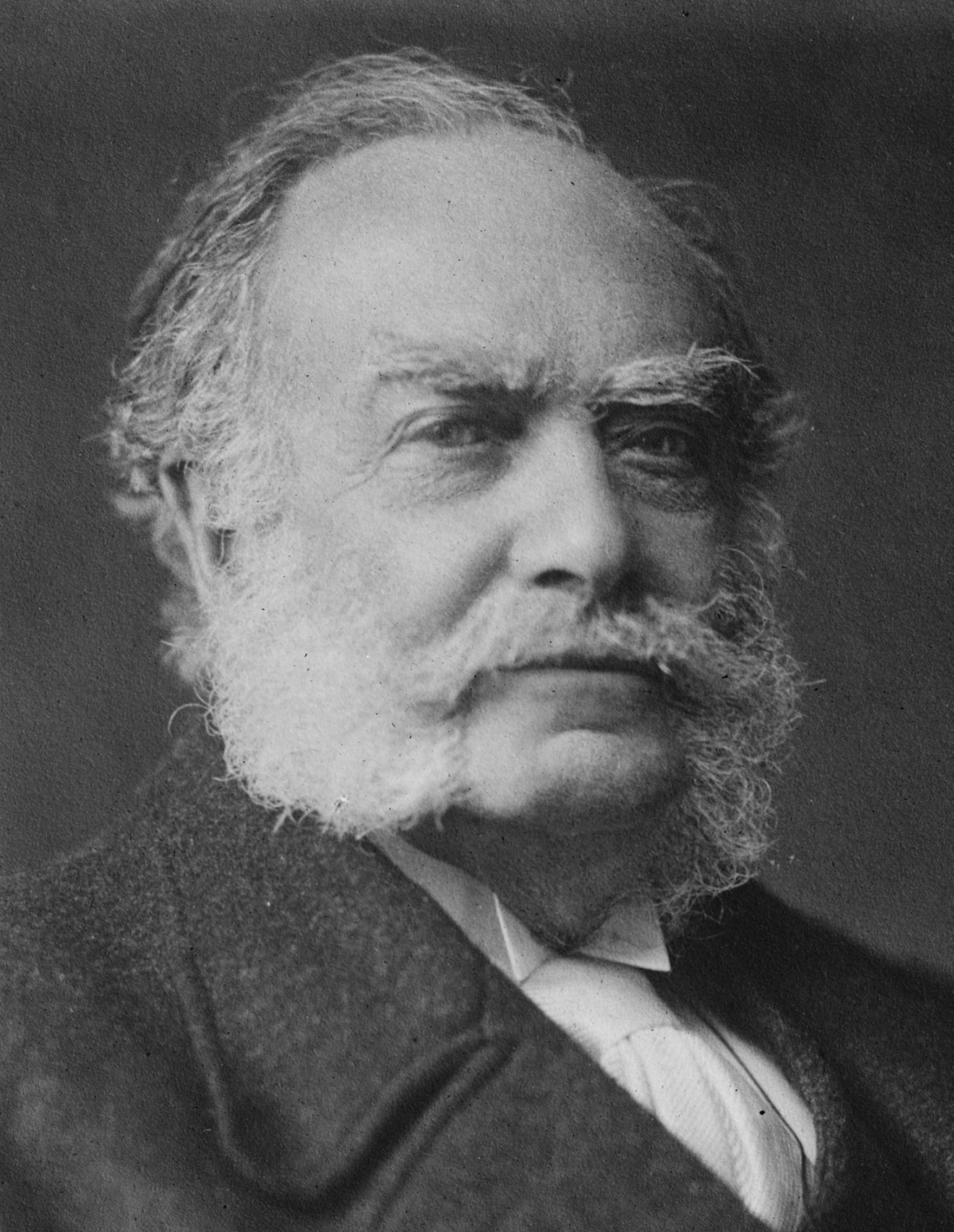
- Born: Alfred Fernandez Yarrow; 13 January 1842; East London, London, United Kingdom
- Died: 24 January 1932 (aged 90); Strand, London, United Kingdom
- Resting place: Highgate Cemetery
- Citizenship: British
- Education: University College School
- Spouses: Minnie Yarrow (m. 1875) Eleanor Yarrow (m. 1922)
- Children: 6
- Parents: Edgar Williams Yarrow (father); Esther Lindo (mother)
- Engineering career
- Discipline: Shipbuilding
- Practice name: Yarrow Shipbuilders

Sir Alfred Fernandez Yarrow, 1st Baronet, (13 January 1842 – 24 January 1932) was a British shipbuilder who started a shipbuilding dynasty, Yarrow Shipbuilders.

== Origins ==
Yarrow was born of humble origins in East London, the son of Esther (Lindo) and Edgar William Yarrow. His mother was of Spanish Sephardic Jewish background and his father was from an English Christian family; Yarrow was raised a Christian. He was educated at University College School.

== Shipbuilding ==
After serving an apprenticeship in nearby Stepney, he opened a yard – Yarrow and Hedley (a partnership) – at Folly Wall, Poplar on the Isle of Dogs in 1865 to build steam river launches. Yarrow's stern wheel steamers, designed with a shallow draft suitable for river navigation, were used in the early stages of the 1884 Nile Expedition.

Yarrow ventured into military vessels from the early 1870s, building torpedo boats for the Argentine and Japanese navies, among other customers. Then in 1892 he built the first two destroyers for the Royal Navy: Havock and Hornet of the Havock class. He struck up a strong friendship and correspondence with Lord Fisher ("Jackie Fisher"), and subsequently Yarrow Shipbuilders became a lead contractor for the Royal Navy for smaller, but almost always fast, boats.

By this time, the Hedley partnership had been dissolved (1875), and the company was known as Yarrow & Co, and around 1898 moved out of Folly shipyard to the nearby London Yard. It was to be a short-lived move, for less than 10 years later (1906–1908) Yarrow gradually moving his yard northwards to Scotstoun on the banks of the River Clyde on the west coast of Scotland, closing the London shipyard in 1908. An operation in Esquimalt, Canada, was purchased in 1913, renamed Yarrows Ltd., and after the Second World War sold to Burrard Dry Dock.

Yarrow's strong naval engineering capabilities and inventive mind were behind a number of inventions designed to drive ships ever faster, and in 1912 he was appointed to the Royal Commission on Fuel and Engines. Long after he died, the shipyard remained famous throughout navies of the world for building smaller fast vessels.

== Personal life ==
He lived in Greenwich, London for some years, occupying Woodlands House in Mycenae Road, Westcombe Park for some years from 1896. In 1899, Yarrow encouraged a young engineer who lived nearby in Greenwich, Alexander Duckham, to specialise in lubricants, leading to the establishment of the Duckhams oil company.

Created a baronet in 1916, Sir Alfred displayed extensive philanthropic tendencies throughout his later years, donating towards: a convalescent home on the Isle of Dogs for the benefit of children; residences for soldiers' widows in Hampstead Garden Suburb (the Barnett Homestead, Erskine Hill); a school, the Royal Merchant Navy College, in Berkshire; a home and hospital for children in Broadstairs, Kent; a scholarship at University College London; fellowships for research in natural science at Girton College, Cambridge; a gallery at Oundle School in Northamptonshire; and medical research at the Royal London Hospital, Whitechapel, among other noble causes. He also left a bequest to the Institution of Civil Engineers.

His first wife, married in 1875, was Minnie Florence Franklin, daughter of Theodosia (née Balderson; daughter of Major G. R. Balderson) and Frank Franklin. Frank Franklin's family were Jewish emigrants from Germany. Yarrow's daughter Minnie Ethel Yarrow was invested as an Officer of the Order of the British Empire (OBE); she married on 18 December 1900 Dr Bertrand Dawson physician to King George V. The actor Damian Lewis is their great-grandson.

Yarrow married his second wife Eleanor Cecilia Barnes on 2 December 1922.

He was succeeded by his son Harold (1884–1962). His younger son, 2/Lt Eric Fernandez Yarrow (born 5 January 1895), was killed in action, aged 20, on 8 May 1915, whilst serving with the Argyll & Sutherland Highlanders. In 1918, he donated an Art Gallery to Oundle School in Eric's memory which is known as the Yarrow Gallery. Son Norman Alfred Yarrow (10 July 1891 – 1956) ran Yarrows shipyards in Victoria, British Columbia.

Yarrow had two other daughters, Florence Yarrow (d. 8 March 1948) and Evelyn Yarrow (d. 13 January 1963).

He died on 24 January 1932 and is buried in Highgate Cemetery.

== Honours and recognition ==
Yarrow was elected an honorary member of the American Society of Mechanical Engineers in 1914 in recognition of his work on high speed vessels, marine engines, and the Yarrow boiler.

In addition to his Baronetcy (1916), he was further honoured in 1922 as a Fellow of the Royal Society, and received an honorary degree of LLD from Glasgow University in 1924.

He was inducted into the Scottish Engineering Hall of Fame in 2024.

== See also ==
- Yarrow boiler

== Gallery ==
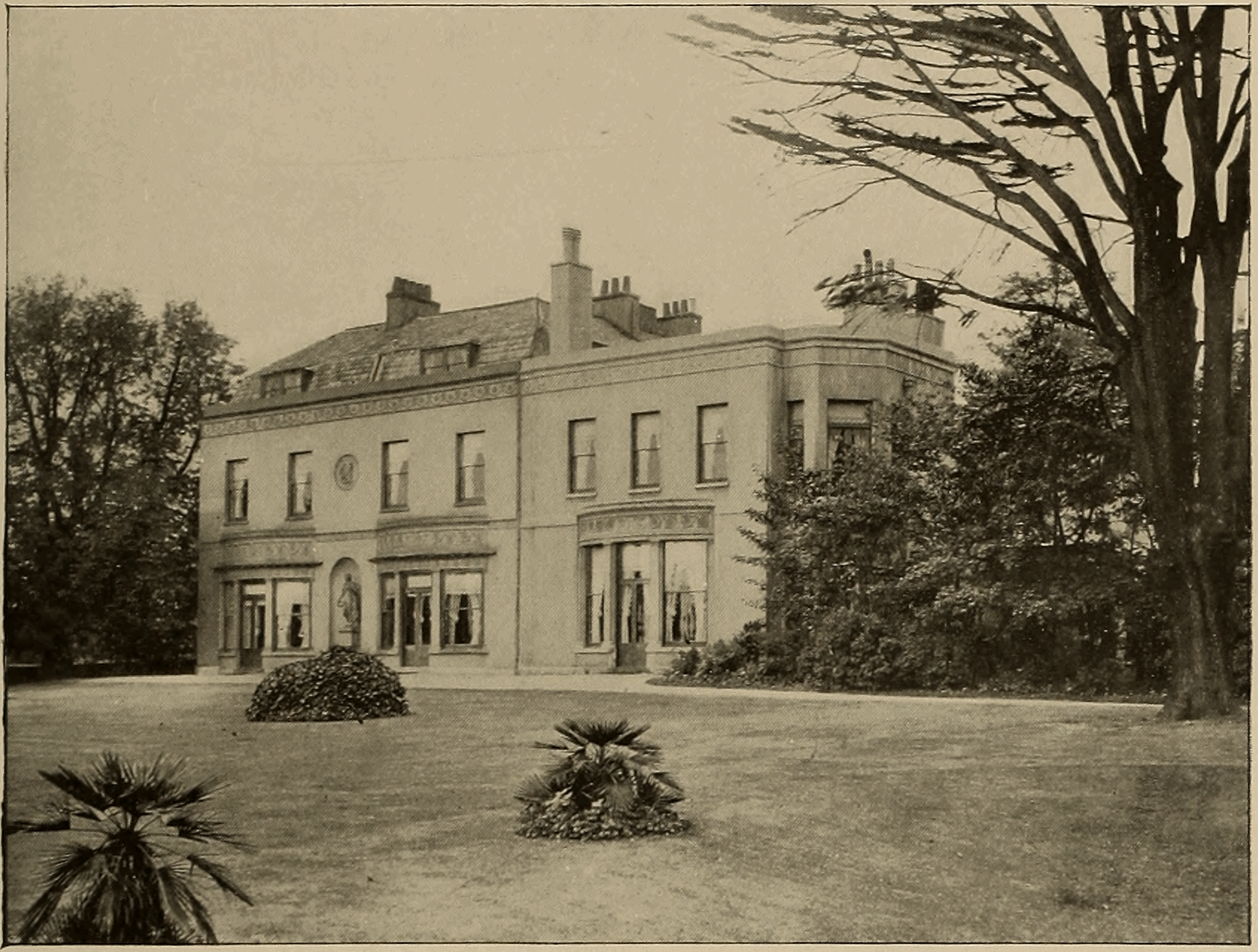
This photo of Woodlands House appeared in the November 1897 edition of Cassier's Magazine as part of an article about Alfred Yarrow.

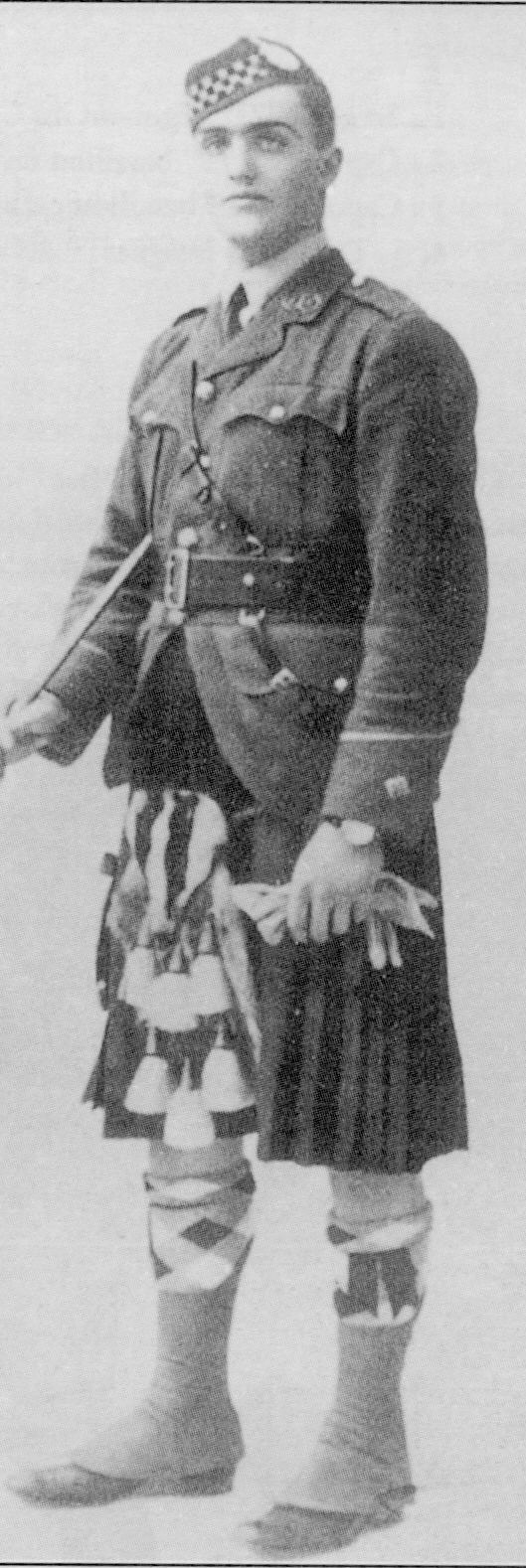
Eric Yarrow, son of Sir Alfred Yarrow

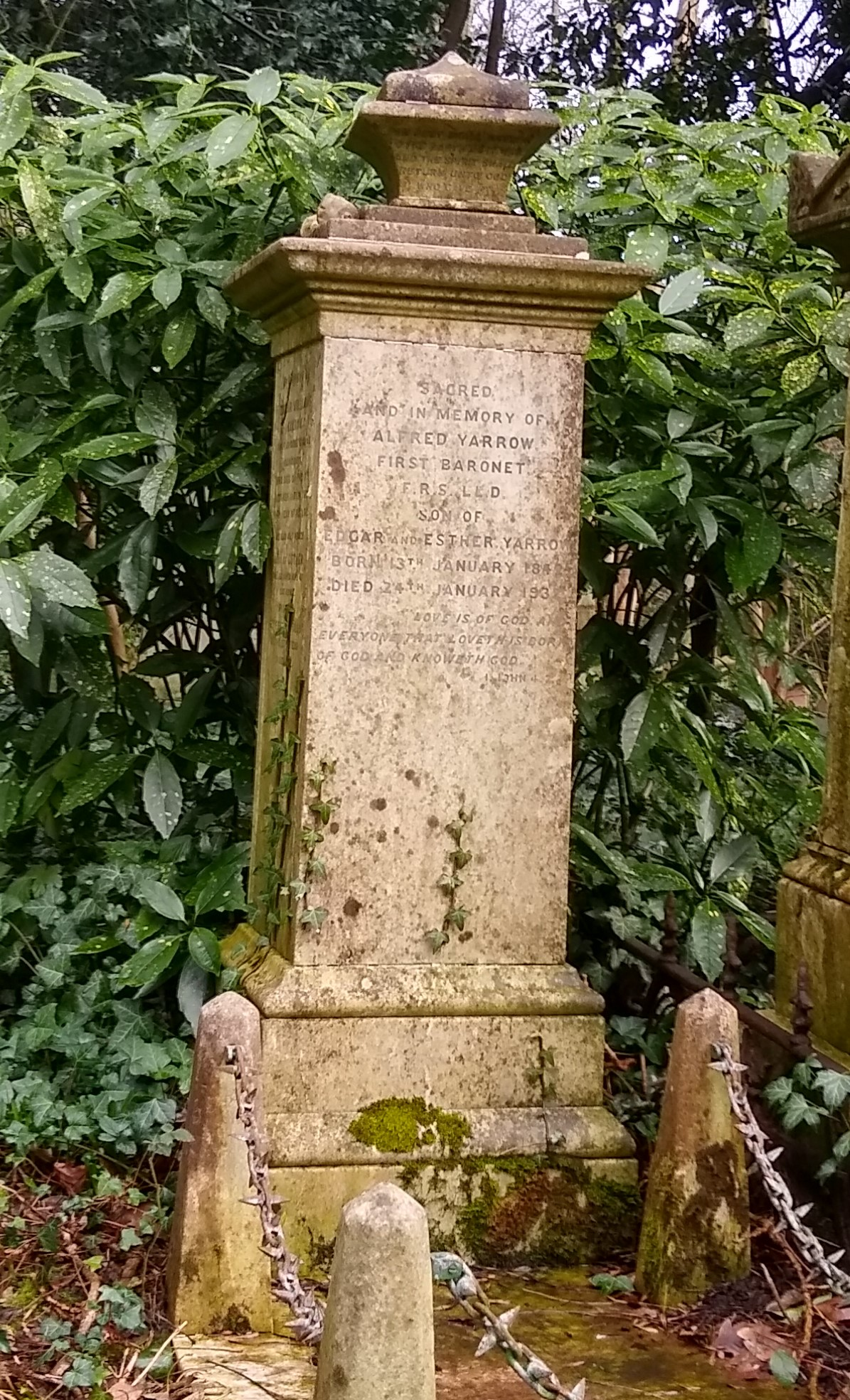
Grave of Sir Alfred Yarrow in Highgate Cemetery (west)

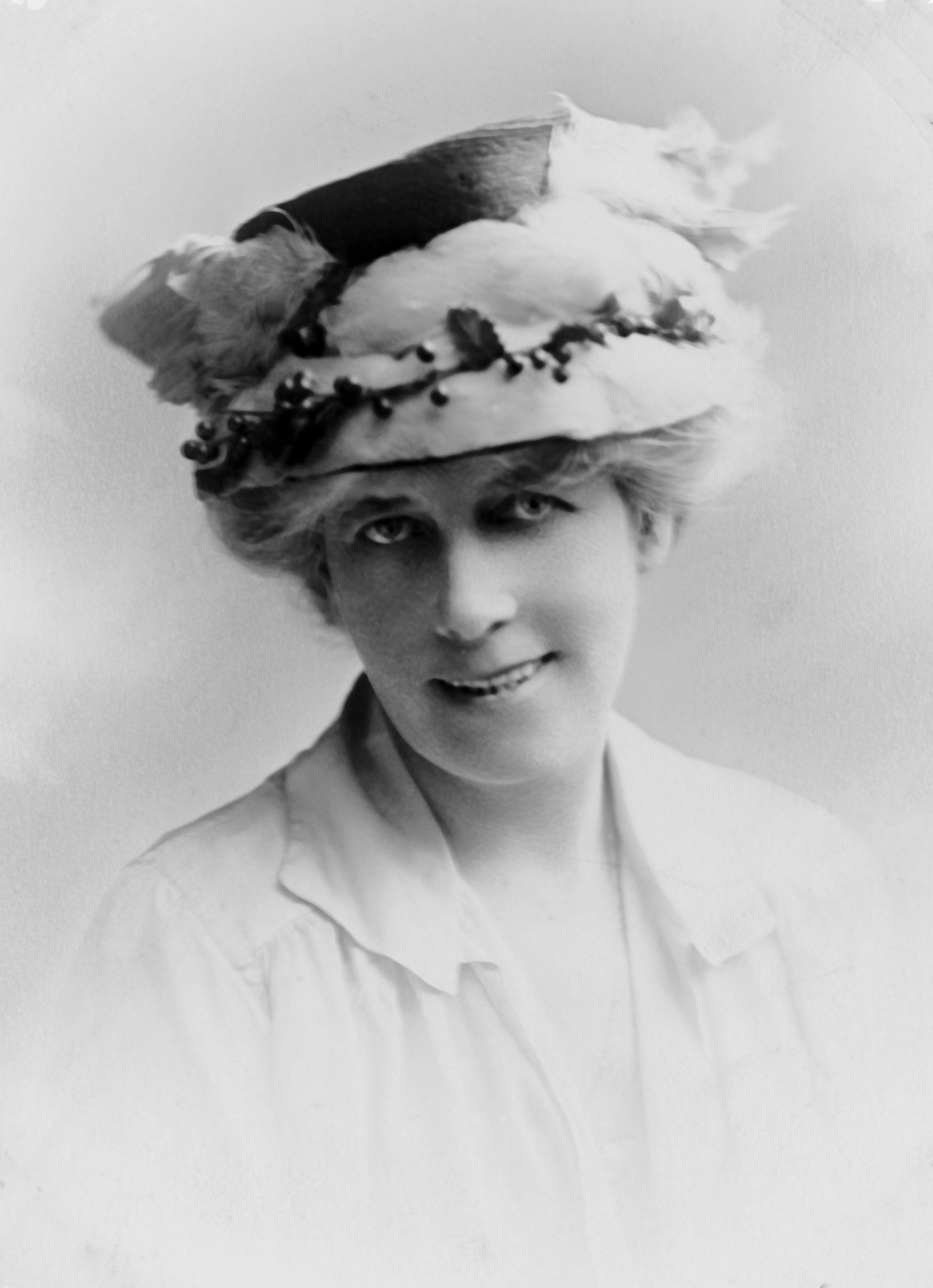
Eleanor Lady Yarrow, née Eleanor Cecilia Barnes, 2nd wife of Sir Alfred Yarrow

== Arms ==
Coat of arms of Alfred Yarrow

Crest
Above clouds Proper a swallow volant Argent holding in the beak a yarrow flower slipped also Proper.
Escutcheon
Azure in base on the sea Proper an ancient three-masted ship sailing to the sinister Argent in chief two swallows volant of the last each holding in the beak a harebell slipped also Proper.
Motto
Be Just And Fear Not

Baronetage of the United Kingdom
New title	Baronet (of Homestead); 1916–1932	Succeeded by Harold Yarrow
