= Frank Bowater =

British politician

Major Sir Frank Bowater Bt CStJ TD DL
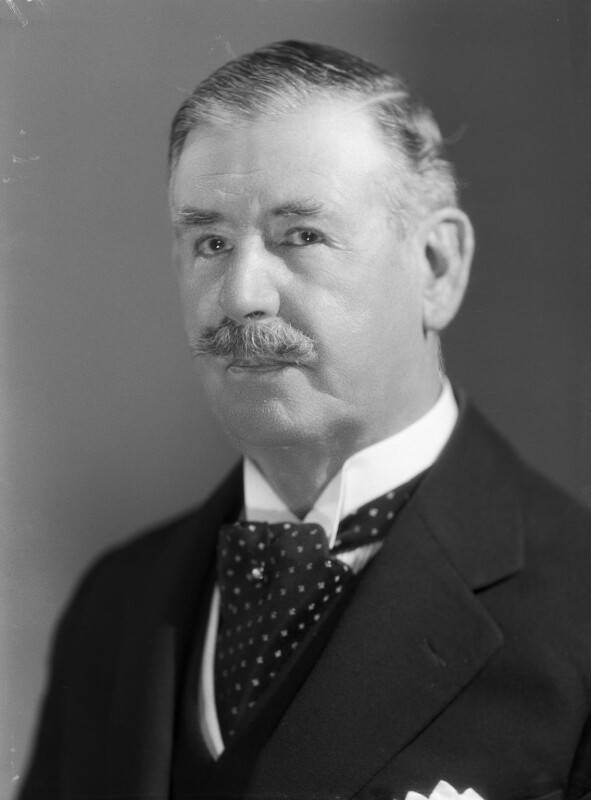
- Bowater in 1938

Lord Mayor of London
- In office 1938–1939

Personal details
- Born: 3 April 1866
- Died: 10 November 1947 (aged 81)

Major Frank Bowater, 1st Baronet (3 April 1866 – 10 November 1947) was Lord Mayor of London from 1938 to 1939.

== Early life ==
He was the son of William Vansittart Bowater and his wife Eliza Jane née Davey.

== Career ==
In 1905, Bowater was commissioned into the 4th London Howitzer Brigade Royal Field Artillery (Royal Artillery, Territorial Army), rose to the rank of major in 1908, and fought in World War I. He also held the office of Lord Lieutenant of the City of London in 1914 and was awarded the Territorial Decoration (TD). From 1929 to 1930 he held the office of Sheriff of London and was decorated with the awards of the Order of the Crown (Romania), Grand Officier of the Legion of Honour and Companion of the Most Venerable Order of the Hospital of Saint John of Jerusalem (CStJ) and was invested as a Knight Bachelor. He then held the office of Lord Mayor of London from 1938 to 1939 and was created 1st Baronet Bowater, of Friston, Suffolk (UK) upon his retirement on 11 October 1939.

== Marriage and issue ==
On 8 October 1891, he married Ethel Anita Fryar, who died on 19 December 1943, following an accident, who was invested as a Companion of the Most Venerable Order of the Hospital of Saint John of Jerusalem (CStJ), daughter of Mark Lindsay Fryar, of Rangoon, Burma, who was in the Indian Civil Service, and they had four children:

- Sir Noël Vansittart Bowater, 2nd Baronet (25 December 1892 – 22 January 1984).
- Ethel May Bowater (13 May 1896 - 1990), who usually went by her middle name of May, married on 5 February 1916 Captain Olaus Charles William Johnsen (25 October 1889 – 20 April 1960), son of W. M. Johnsen, and had issue.
- Beryl Stuart Bowater (11 December 1902 – 8 October 1972), married on 9 April 1931 Colonel Arthur Howard Eckford Howell, who lived at 5 Headford Place, London, gained the rank of Colonel in the service of the Royal Artillery and was decorated with the awards of the Territorial Decoration (TD) and Companion of the Distinguished Service Order (DSO), son of Lieutenant Colonel Ernest Alfred Russell Howell), and had issue
- Sir Ian Frank Bowater (16 December 1904 – 1 October 1982).

== Arms ==
Coat of arms of Frank Bowater
Crest A Rainbow issuant from Water proper Escutcheon Argent on an Inescutcheon Sable between eight Martlets in orle Gules a Crescent of the field Motto Nec Aspera Terrent (Difficulties do not daunt)

== Sources ==
- Charles Mosley, editor, Burke's Peerage and Baronetage, 106th edition, 2 volumes (Crans, Switzerland: Burke's Peerage (Genealogical Books) Ltd, 1999), volume 1, pages 51, 456 and 457.

Political offices
Preceded by Harry Twyford	Lord Mayor of London; 1938–1939	Succeeded by Sir William Coxen
Baronetage of the United Kingdom
New creation	Baronet (of Friston); 1939–1947	Succeeded by Noel Bowater
