= Eric Yarrow =

British businessman (1920–2018)

Sir Eric Yarrow Bt MBE DL CEng FRSE MRINA
- Born: Eric Grant Yarrow; 23 April 1920; Bearsden, Glasgow
- Died: 22 September 2018 (aged 98); Kilmacolm, Scotland
- Education: Marlborough
- Alma mater: University of Glasgow (MA)
- Occupations: President, Yarrow plc; chair, Clydesdale Bank (retd)
- Parent: Sir Harold Yarrow Bt GBE (father)

Sir Eric Grant Yarrow, 3rd Baronet, MBE, DL, FRSE (23 April 1920 – 22 September 2018) was a British businessman.

After serving during World War II as a major in the Royal Engineers, he joined the family business Yarrows of Scotstoun, Glasgow in 1946, becoming managing director when aged 38 and chairman, following the death of his father, Harold Yarrow, in 1962 when Sir Eric was aged 42. Later he became President of Yarrow plc until 1987, and was a non-executive director of the Clydesdale Bank from 1962 to 1985 then chairman until 1991.

He is credited with steering successfully the distinguished Glasgow shipbuilding company through some of the most turbulent periods in the British shipbuilding industry's history and with enhancing the name and status of the family firm when many shipyards were failing. Critical to the success was maintaining and developing the relationship with the Royal Navy, where a Yarrow ship was traditionally regarded as a fast ship. (Yarrows having built the first destroyer to exceed 30 knots). Sir Eric went to great efforts to maintain and develop this reputation, leading to a stream of orders from the Royal Navy and overseas navies when new business was thin on the ground. As a result, Yarrows became a prime contractor on the Type 21, Type 22, Type 23 and Type 45 frigate programmes for the Royal Navy and remains involved in the Type 26 programme alongside the Govan yard.

Yarrow was appointed a Vice-President of RINA in 1972 as well as serving as prime warden of the Shipwrights' Company (1970–71), among other charitable activities.

Appointed Member of the Order of the British Empire (MBE) for military service in 1946, he succeeded as 3rd baronet in 1962, upon the death of his father, Sir Harold Yarrow Bt GBE, later becoming a Deputy Lieutenant for Renfrewshire in 1970. He is succeeded to the title by his eldest grandson, Ross.

== Philanthropic and other interests ==
At home Sir Eric held appointments with a number of shipbuilding and other engineering organisations He was Deacon of the Incorporation of Hammermen in the Trades House in Glasgow in 1961, Prime Warden of the Worshipful Company of Shipwrights in 1970, and was made a Fellow of the Royal Society of Edinburgh in 1975. He also followed the family tradition of support for the Princess Louise Hospital at Erskine, acting as chairman of the board of governors for several years, and personally supporting many functions and fund-raising activities. He also took an active interest in the Burma Star Association, becoming president of the Scottish Branch in 1990.

== Personal life ==
On 28 April 1951, he married Rosemary Ann Young (who died in 1957). They had one child, a son, Richard Grant Yarrow (born 21 March 1953; died 1987), who by his wife Sheila Allison (married 1982) had two sons, including Ross Yarrow (born 1985), who inherited his title.

Yarrow married second, on 23 May 1959, Annette Elizabeth Françoise Steven, by whom he had three more sons – Norman, Peter (twins, born 1960) and David Yarrow (born 1966). The couple divorced in 1975.

Sir Eric lived in Renfrewshire with his third wife, Caroline Botting, née Masters, whom he married in 1982. He died on 22 September 2018 at the age of 98.

== Honours ==
- Baronet (abbr: Bt)
- MBE (Member, Order of the British Empire)
- OStJ (Officer, Order of St John of Jerusalem)

Coat of arms of Eric Yarrow

Crest
Above clouds Proper a swallow volant Argent holding in the beak a yarrow flower slipped also Proper.
Escutcheon
Azure in base on the sea Proper an ancient three-masted ship sailing to the sinister Argent in chief two swallows volant of the last each holding in the beak a harebell slipped also Proper.
Motto
Be Just And Fear Not

== See also ==
- Yarrow baronets

Baronetage of the United Kingdom
| Preceded by Harold Yarrow | Baronet (of Homestead); 1962–2018 | Succeeded by Ross Yarrow |
