= William Vansittart Bowater =

British businessman

William Vansittart Bowater (15 March 1838 – 28 April 1907) was the founder of Bowater, which became one of the world's largest producers of newspaper print.

== Career ==
Having trained as a manager with James Wrigley in print paper manufacturing in Manchester, Bowater decided to establish himself in business as a paper agent in 1881. The business expanded rapidly in the final decades of the nineteenth century, supplying newsprint for both the Daily Mail and the Daily Chronicle.

Bowater married Eliza Jane Davey in 1861 and they went on to have nine children, including Sir Thomas Vansittart Bowater and Sir Frank Vansittart Bowater, both of whom were to become Lord Mayor of London. Another child was Mabel Bowater, who died on 16 June 1919: her husband was tried but acquitted of her murder.

They lived at Bury Hall in Edmonton north of London.
