= Creekmouth =

Coordinates: 51.5169°N 0.0991°E

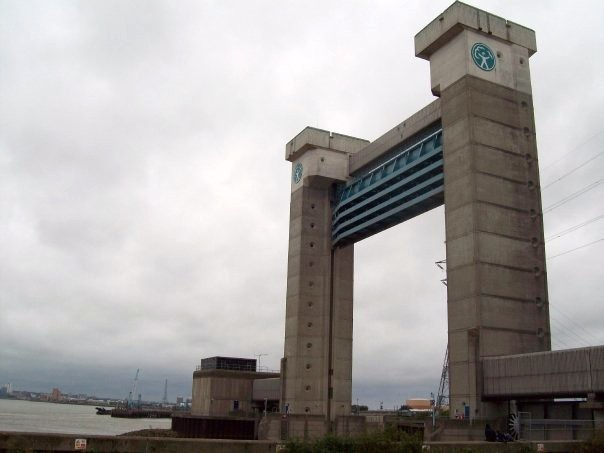
- Barking Creek tidal barrier from the Creekmouth industrial estate

- Location within Greater London
- OS grid reference: TQ457448
  - Charing Cross: 10 mi (16 km) W
- London borough: Barking & Dagenham
- Ceremonial county: Greater London
- Region: London
- Country: England
- Sovereign state: United Kingdom
- Post town: BARKING
- Postcode district: IG11
- Dialling code: 020
- Police: Metropolitan
- Fire: London
- Ambulance: London
- UK Parliament: Barking
- London Assembly: City and East

Creekmouth is an area of Barking in east London, England. It is best known for its large industrial estate. The industrial area around River Road and Thames Road is one of the London Borough of Barking and Dagenham's largest employment areas. Creekmouth has a wide range of businesses from small local manufacturers to major multi-national companies.

== History ==
The Creekmouth Village as it was known, was built not far from the Thames and Roding riverbanks in the 1850s by John Bennett Lawes, primarily for workers at his factory, the Lawes Chemical and Fertiliser Company. The village consisted of two rows of small houses, approximately fifty in total, and had its own school, Mission Hall, shop and a public house called The Crooked Billet, which is mentioned in records going back to 1719. The village community was very isolated.

Most people who lived here worked for the chemical factory, or on the river, on the barges or as Lightermen. The area was surrounded by marshes and fields full of grazing cows and horses. For much of the 20th century Creekmouth was the location of the former Barking Power Station; the current station is further east near Dagenham Dock.

The 1953 North Sea flood struck the village hard - with the sea surge flooding the entirety of the village to a height of 3 feet (0.91 m). Although no one lost their lives, the village at Creekmouth was demolished soon after. Residents were rehoused on the nearby Thames View Estate. Subsequently, the Barking Creek tidal barrier was constructed in the early 1980s as part of the wider flood defences of London.

== Governance ==
The local authority is Barking and Dagenham London Borough Council. The area is within the Thames ward, which returns three councillors. For elections to the London Assembly it is part of the City and East constituency. For elections to the UK Parliament it is within the Barking constituency.

== Geography ==
The regeneration project, costing £290,000 was started in 2005 and has seen the Environment Agency work in partnership with local charity the Creekmouth Preservation Society to transform disused land at the Barking Barrier into a green space.

Billy Bragg, poet and musician, originally from nearby Barking, helped local children from Thames View Junior School plant over 500 wild flower bulbs at the "Creekmouth Open Space" at the Barking Barrier on 28 November 2007.

== Transport ==
Creekmouth is served by the East London Transit bus service EL3, which runs between Little Heath and Barking Riverside and the East London Transit routes EL1 and EL2 serve nearby Thames View, to the north of Creekmouth with routes to Barking, Ilford, Barking Riverside and Dagenham Dock

A Creekmouth DLR station was proposed on the Dagenham Dock extension of the Docklands Light Railway, however this was cancelled in 2008.
