= Docklands Light Railway extension to Dagenham Dock =

Proposed transit project in Thames Gateway

Coordinates: 51°30′32″N 0°04′18″E

Overview
- Status: Historic proposal
- Locale: London Borough of Newham; London Borough of Barking and Dagenham
- Termini: Gallions Reach; Dagenham Dock
- Stations: 5

Service
- Type: Light metro
- System: Docklands Light Railway

Technical
- Track gauge: 4 ft 8+1/2 in (1,435 mm) standard gauge

The Docklands Light Railway extension to Dagenham Dock was a proposed extension of the Docklands Light Railway (DLR) to Dagenham Dock in East London, to serve the Barking Riverside development and the wider London Riverside part of the Thames Gateway.

Plans for the extension can be traced back to 2002 and it was included in the London Plan from 2004. It had been anticipated that it could be completed and open for use by 2017. In November 2008, the Mayor of London Boris Johnson announced that due to financial constraints further development of the extension had been cancelled.

Since July 2022, the Barking Riverside development has been served by an extension of the London Overground to a new station at Barking Riverside. Proposals to extend the Docklands Light Railway to Thamesmead have subsequently become a priority instead of an extension to Dagenham Dock.

== History ==
=== Proposal development ===
In 2002, the London Riverside Urban Strategy proposed an extension of the Docklands Light Railway (DLR) from Gallions Reach over Barking Creek, through Barking Riverside, South Dagenham and on to CEME and Rainham to support housing development in the London Riverside section of the Thames Gateway. The London Plan published by the Greater London Authority in 2004 and 2008 included the extension of the DLR as far as Dagenham Dock.

In 2007, a number of route options went to public consultation, with a decision made in November. An application for a Transport and Works Act order was made during 2008. A public inquiry was due to take place and the project was expected to be completed in 2017 at a cost of around £750m.

The public enquiry was postponed, following the announcement by Mayor of London Boris Johnson in November 2008 that further development of the project had been cancelled.

The extension to Dagenham Dock was included in the Mayor's Transport Strategy published in May 2010 and the London Plan published in July 2011.

=== Barking Riverside alternative rail service ===
A Grampian condition limited the number of homes that could be built in the Barking Riverside development that the extension was intended to serve. Until adequate public transport could be provided the number of homes was limited to 1,200. In 2016, Transport for London assessed various options to bring transport links to Barking Riverside, including the previously proposed DLR extension. Subsequently, the Gospel Oak to Barking line of the London Overground was extended from Barking to a new station in Barking Riverside to serve the area. This opened in July 2022, at a cost of around £325m. The Overground extension cost around half as much as the DLR extension.

=== Further proposals ===
The Mayor's Transport Strategy published in March 2018 proposed an extension of the DLR towards Thamesmead and Barking town centre. In December 2019, an extension to Thamesmead was formally proposed by TfL that would diverge from the Beckton branch at Gallions Reach and could include a station at Beckton Riverside. The London Plan published in March 2021 prioritises the Thamesmead extension. In 2023, an outline business case for the extension to Thamesmead via Beckton Riverside was submitted to Government.

Barking and Dagenham Council continue to have an aspiration to extend the DLR to Dagenham Dock, including it in their transport priorities for the borough in October 2021. In July 2024 it was confirmed by the Deputy Mayor of London for Transport that construction of the extension to Thamesmead would not preclude a further branch into Barking and Dagenham.

== Proposed route and stations ==
The 2008 proposed route diverged from the Beckton branch at Gallions Reach station in the London Borough of Newham. It would have followed the River Thames north bank, crossing the mouth of the River Roding in a bored tunnel south of the Barking Flood Barrier. Here the route would have entered the London Borough of Barking and Dagenham, following the River Thames on a viaduct before heading northwards to reach Goresbrook and Dagenham Dock. It was envisaged that four new stations would be built, with additional platforms at the existing c2c station at Dagenham Dock.

The 2007 consultation noted that the DLR could be extended further from Dagenham Dock, such as north towards Dagenham Heathway or east towards Rainham. The London Borough of Barking and Dagenham supported these additional extensions, provided it could be achieved without negatively impacting on existing infrastructure in the area.

Station locale	London borough
Beckton Riverside	Newham
Creekmouth	Barking and Dagenham
Barking Riverside	Barking and Dagenham
Goresbrook (formerly Dagenham Vale)	Barking and Dagenham
Dagenham Dock (existing station)	Barking and Dagenham
