= Barking Riverside railway station =

London Overground station

Barking Riverside
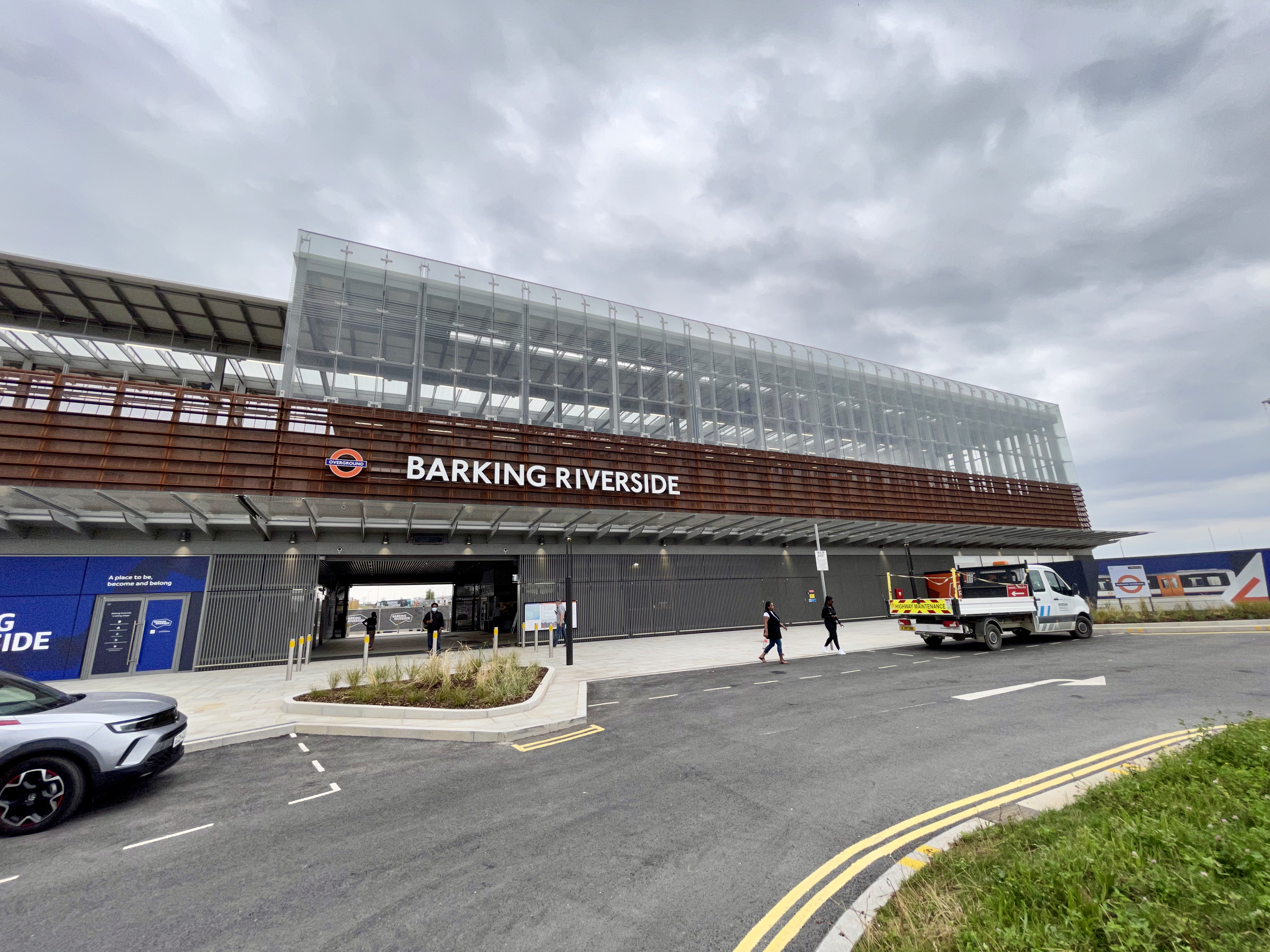
- The completed station in July 2022

General information
- Location: Barking Riverside, Barking and Dagenham
- Coordinates: 51.519108°N 0.114764°E
- Owner: Transport for London
- Manager: London Overground
- Platforms: 2
- Connections: Barking Riverside Pier

Construction
- Accessible: Yes

Other information
- Station code: BGV
- Fare zone: 4
- Website: Official website

History
- Opened: 18 July 2022

Passengers

National Rail annual entry and exit
- 2022–23: 0.461 million
- 2023–24: ▲0.945 million
- 2024–25: ▲1.209 million
- 2025–26: ▲1.340 million
Location
- Location in Barking and Dagenham

Barking Riverside is a railway station in the London Borough of Barking and Dagenham, East London. The eastern terminus of the Suffragette line of the London Overground, the station serves the Barking Riverside regeneration area and was built as part of a £327m extension of the Gospel Oak to Barking line. It opened on 18 July 2022 and provides interchange with the Uber Boat by Thames Clippers boat service from Barking Riverside Pier.

The extension runs partly over the existing London, Tilbury and Southend line from Barking, operated over by c2c, and over 1.5 kilometres (0.93 mi) of new track laid to the new station. The extension reduces typical journey times to the centre of Barking from the area by 18 minutes.

== History ==
The Barking Riverside development is a brownfield site of some 440 acres (180 ha), on the site of the former Barking Power Station. The site has planning permission for around 10,800 homes, however planning restrictions prevent more than 1,200 homes without adequate transport links.

An extension of the Docklands Light Railway to Dagenham Dock was proposed in the mid-2000s at a cost of around £750m, however this extension was cancelled in 2008 by then Mayor of London Boris Johnson. Following this, Transport for London assessed various options to bring transport links to Barking Riverside, including the previously proposed DLR extension, extension of the Hammersmith & City line to Grays, new segregated, high frequency bus services and a new station at Renwick Road.

Following a decision to extend the Gospel Oak to Barking line to the area in 2014, the proposed route was consulted on in 2014, 2015 and 2016. Following this, a Transport and Works Act Order for the extension and new station was submitted in March 2016. As part of this process, a public inquiry was held in October 2016. The Transport and Works Order was approved in August 2017.

Following approval of the Transport and Works Order in August 2017, construction on the extension by a joint venture of Morgan Sindall and VolkerFitzpatrick began in late 2018. Construction was originally expected to take 3 years at a cost of £260m, with the new station opening in December 2021. The station building has been designed by Weston Williamson. Following delays caused by COVID-19 pandemic restrictions and utility diversion issues, it was announced in December 2020 that the extension would be delayed until Autumn 2022, with a cost increase to £327m.

In June 2022, TfL announced that the extension's opening would be brought forward to open in summer 2022. This was followed by an announcement on 11 July 2022 that services would begin on 18 July 2022. The opening coincided with the 2022 United Kingdom heat wave with temperatures of nearly 40 °C. TfL issued a warning to passengers advising them to only travel if essential. As a result, the first day of operation saw few passengers. The London Overground service at the station was rebranded as the Suffragette line from November 2024.

== Location ==
Leaving Barking station towards the southeast, the extension of the Gospel Oak to Barking line runs on the London, Tilbury and Southend line for around 2.4 km (1.5 mi). It then branches from the existing line, passing underneath Renwick Road where a future station at Renwick Road has been passively safeguarded. The extension then turns south, crossing the main line and the Ripple Lane freight yard on a viaduct, as well as crossing over the High Speed 1 tunnels. The viaduct then continues south for 1.5 km (0.93 mi) to the elevated station at Barking Riverside.

Barking Riverside town centre is being built adjacent to the station, with public space, shops, community facilities and a bus interchange.

Thames Clippers services from Barking Riverside Pier are a short walk away from the station. East London Transit branded bus routes EL1 and EL3 also serve the station.

== Future ==
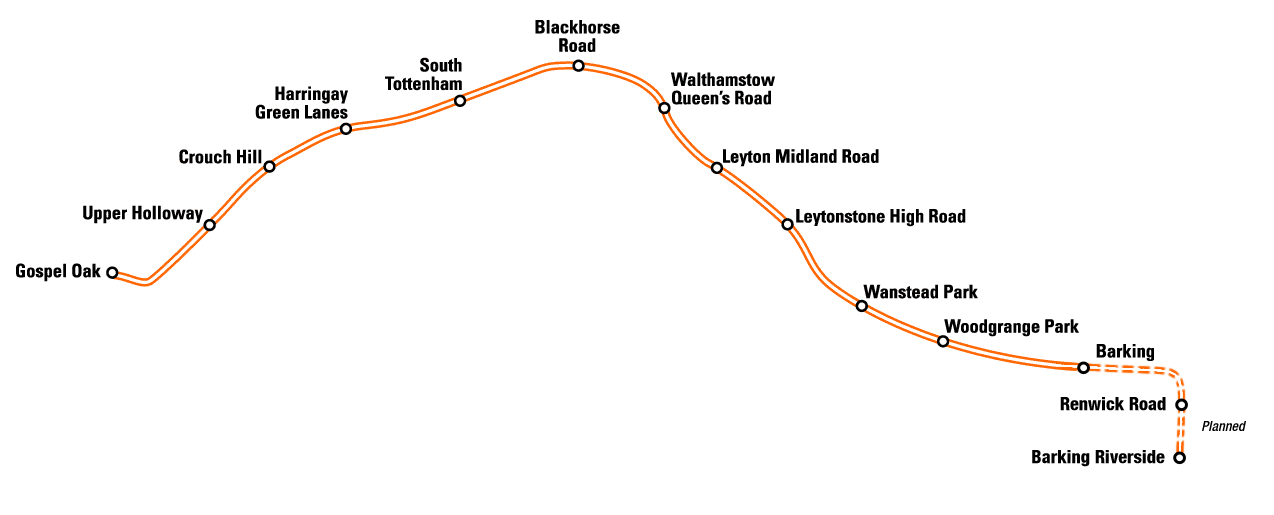
Gospel Oak to Barking line with Barking Riverside extension (and proposed Renwick Road station)

There have been calls to extend the line further south across the river to Thamesmead and Abbey Wood. In August 2017, the Government granted permission for the extension, with a future provision for a stop at Renwick Road. A future extension across the Thames is not prevented by this project, however an extension of the Docklands Light Railway to Thamesmead has been proposed instead.

== Services ==
The station is owned by Transport for London, however the railway infrastructure was handed over to Network Rail upon project completion. All services at Barking Riverside are operated by London Overground using Class 710 EMUs.

The typical off-peak service is four trains per hour to and from Gospel Oak, reducing to three trains per hour in the late evenings.

Preceding station	London Overground	Following station
Barking towards Gospel Oak	Suffragette line Gospel Oak to Barking line	Terminus
