= London Sustainable Industries Park =

Eco-industrial park in London, England

- Interactive map of London Sustainable Industries Park
- Location: Dagenham Dock, London
- Coordinates: 51.523122°N 0.136288°E
- Opening date: December 2008
- Owner: GLA Land and Property
- Size: 60 acres (24 ha)

London Sustainable Industries Park (LSIP) is a 60-acre eco-industrial park in the Dagenham Dock area of the London Borough of Barking and Dagenham in London, England. Around half the plots are taken up by whole businesses and the remaining half have been sold to Segro to be divided up into spaces for smaller businesses, marketed as Segro Park Dagenham.

== History ==
In 2007 the London Development Agency started developing the 60-acre site in Dagenham Dock. The London Thames Gateway Development Corporation announced plans for the site in August 2008. Closed Loop Recycling, a plastic recycling plant, were the first business to become operational in December 2008. In 2012 the site ownership transferred to GLA Land and Property when the London Development Agency was wound up. The Mayor of London announced improvements to roads, footpaths, cycle ways, utilities, drainage and landscaping at the site in 2012. TEG Biogas, an anaerobic digestion and composting facility, began operating in April 2014.

The sustainable industries park is defined in the Barking and Dagenham local plan as "a defined industrial location in which new employment opportunities embrace the following: research and development, sustainable industrial and business accommodation, recycling operations, energy efficiency, ‘green links’ between businesses, sustainable transportation, environmental technology and waste minimisation."

== Businesses ==
Land north of Choats Road is known as LSIP North:

- Plot 1 - Segro Park Dagenham (Segro) - 13 units
- Plot 2 - Thames Gateway Waste To Energy/Cyclamax
- Plot 3 - Segro Park Dagenham - 2 units
- Plot 4 - Thames Gateway Institute for Sustainability
- Plot 5 - Saria Ltd/ReFood
- Plot 6 - Not owned by GLA Land and Property

Land south of Choats Road is known as LSIP South:

- Plot 7a - TEG Biogas/East London Biogas (Bio Capital Group)
- Plot 7b - Segro Park Dagenham
- Plot 8 - Capital Dairy Company
- Plot 9 - City of London Corporation for part of future Dagenham Dock wholesale market
- Plot 10 - Segro Park Dagenham
- Plot 11 - Closed Loop Recycling
