= East London Transit =

Bus rapid transit scheme in London

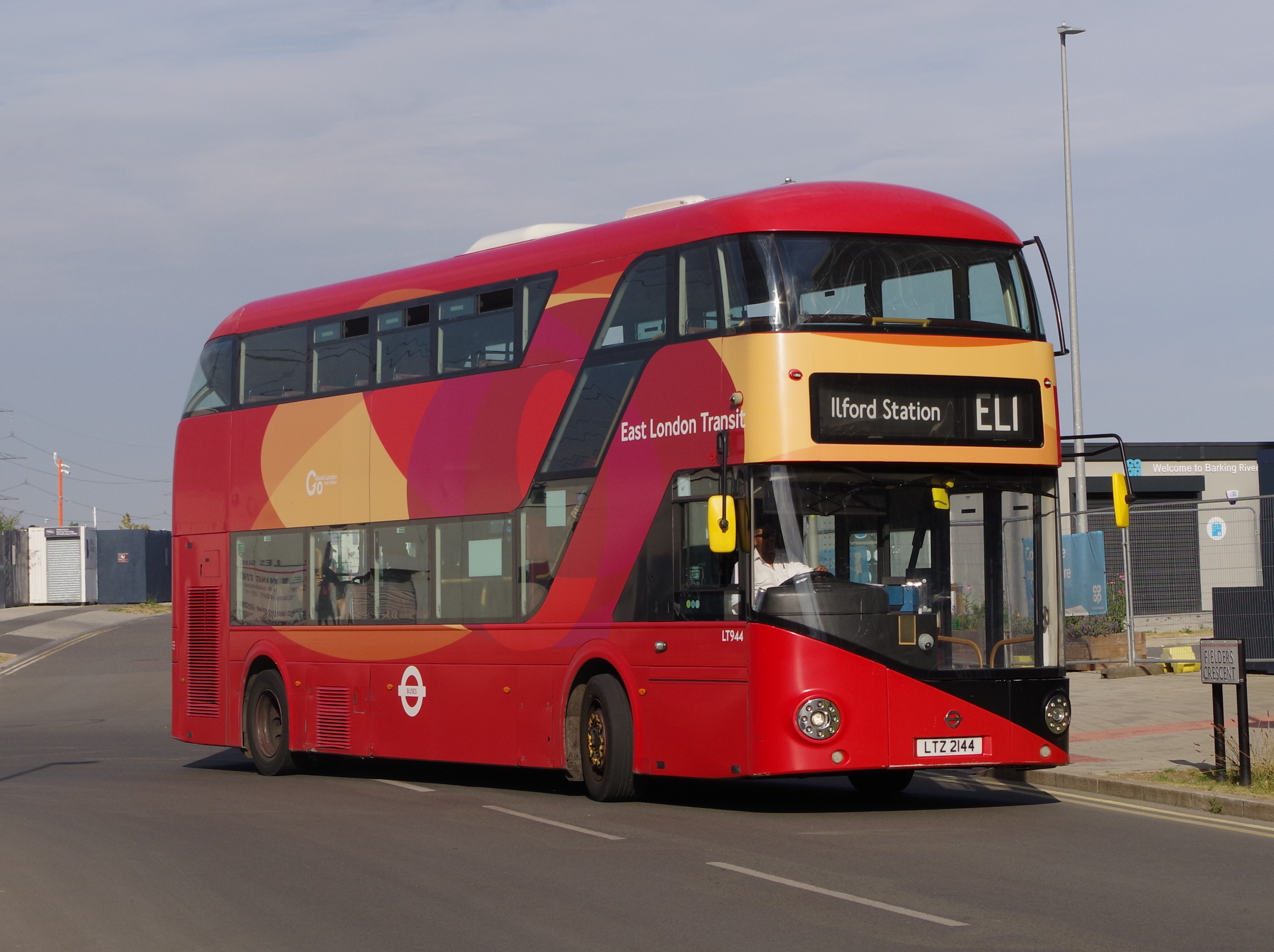
- East London Transit liveried New Routemaster on route EL1 in July 2022
- Parent: Transport for London
- Founded: 20 February 2010
- Headquarters: Westminster
- Locale: East London
- Service area: Barking & Dagenham, Redbridge
- Service type: Bus rapid transit
- Routes: 3: EL1 (Ilford-Barking Riverside); EL2 (Becontree Heath-Dagenham Dock); EL3 (Little Heath-Barking Riverside)
- Destinations: Ilford, Barking, Goodmayes, Thames View, Becontree Heath, Barking Riverside
- Hubs: Barking Riverside
- Fleet: New Routemaster
- Fuel type: Hybrid
- Operator: Blue Triangle (Go-Ahead London)

East London Transit (ELT) is a part-segregated bus rapid transit system in London, England, operated as part of the London Buses network. The East London Transit opened in phases between 2010 and 2013. The scheme for this system was developed by Transport for London to meet the existing and anticipated demand for public transport in east London caused by the Thames Gateway redevelopment, and has been planned to allow for a possible future upgrade to tram operation.

It connects National Rail, London Underground, the Elizabeth line and London Overground stations in the London boroughs of the Redbridge, and Barking and Dagenham with other major population centers, such as Barking Riverside, that were currently only served by bus routes. The first stage of the scheme opened on 20 February 2010. There are proposals for a variety of extensions.

== History ==
The East London Transit (ELT) was developed by Transport for London as an integrated public transport system in conjunction with the London Borough of Barking and Dagenham and the London Borough of Redbridge and other stakeholders.

There are three routes in the East London Transit system. EL1 replaced the previous route 369 bus service and operated 24 hours a day, initially between Thames View Estate and Ilford, and has since been extended from Thames View Estate to Barking Riverside. EL2 operated over the whole length of the phase 1 route between Dagenham Dock and Ilford until March 2016, when it was amended to run to Becontree Heath after leaving Barking. EL3 replaced the previous route 387 operated between Little Heath and Barking Riverside, the route change through Barking Town Centre. As a result of these changes, route 179 was withdrawn between Ilford and Barking and was diverted to terminate at Ilford (Hainault Street) bus terminus.

Each route operates five buses an hour on Monday to Saturday daytimes and three buses an hour during the evenings and on Sunday; this gives a combined frequency of ten buses an hour over the core route from Barking to Thames View Estate during the day.

=== Delivered phases ===
Phase 1

- Ilford — Barking — Thames View Estate — Dagenham Dock station

Phase 1 commenced on 20 February 2010.

Phase 2

- Barking — Thames View Estate — Barking Reach

Construction of phase 2 began in 2011 and was completed in 2013. It received funding from the Homes and Communities Agency.

=== Extension to Barking Reach ===
In 2013 it was proposed to extend route EL1 from Thames View Estate to Barking Reach, Mallards Road and a consultation was held. The extended service started on 7 September 2013.

=== Extension to Barking Riverside, Northgate Road ===
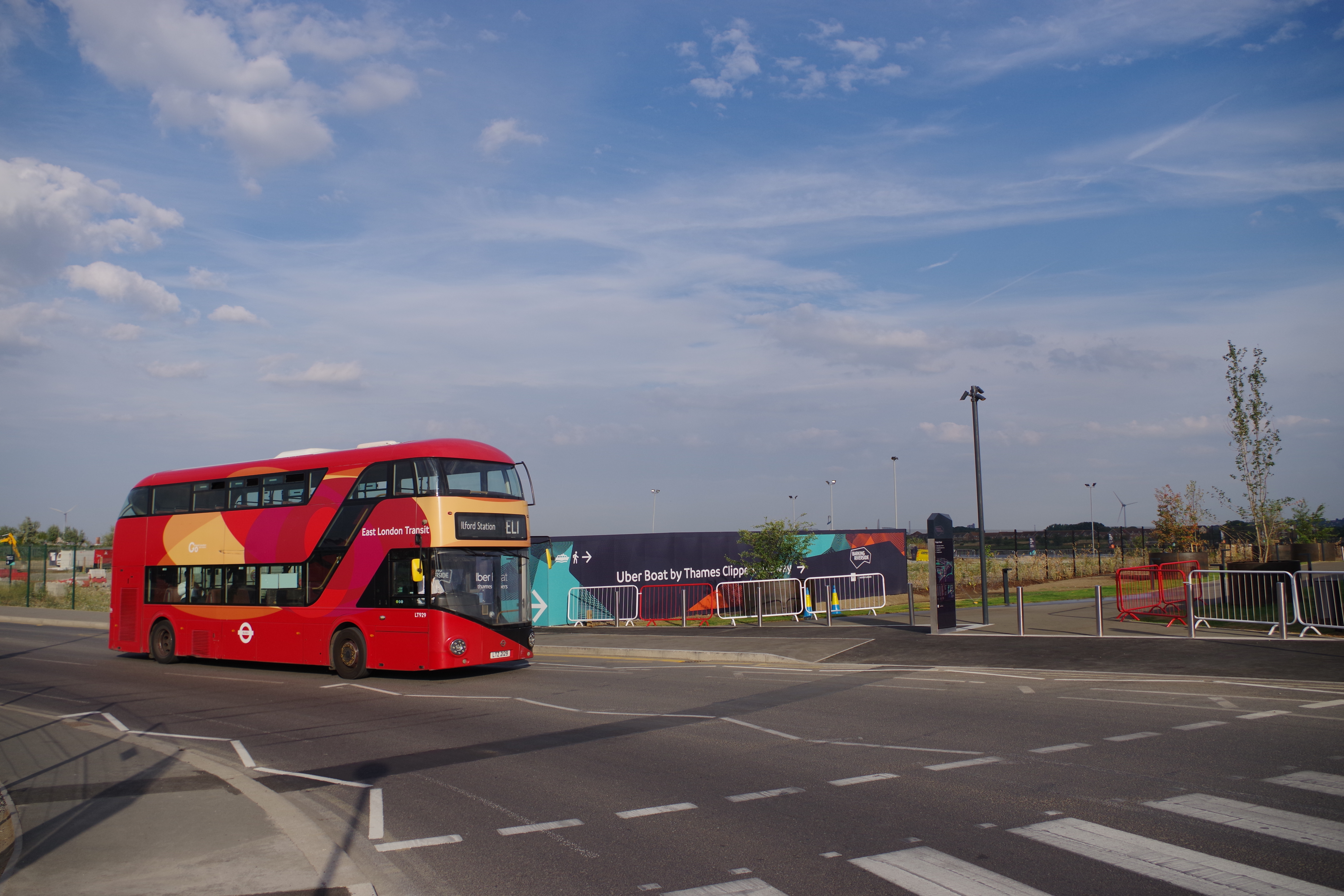
A route EL1 bus on the new Northgate Road extension passing the newly opened Barking Riverside pier.

In 2020, the route EL1 was extended from the Barking Reach terminus to further serve the new housing developments that had been built in the area. The route was extended to terminate at the newly built Northgate Road on the far east side of the development and was routed to pass the new Barking Riverside station and Barking Riverside pier that opened in 2022. Route EL3, which commenced operating on 18 February 2017, between Little Heath and Barking Reach but via Creekmouth, also has two schoolday journeys that are extended beyond Mallards Road to Northgate Road, however the route still terminates at Mallards Road at all other times.

== Network ==

Route EL1 operates via these primary locations:

- Ilford Hill for Ilford station
- Ilford Ilford Lane
- Barking station
- Vicarage Field Shopping Centre
- Creekmouth Waverley Gardens
- Thames View Christ Church
- Barking Riverside Riverside Centre
- Barking Riverside station
- Barking Riverside Northgate Road

Route EL2 operates via these primary locations:

- Becontree Heath Leisure Centre
- Becontree Martins Corner
- Barking Longbridge Road
- Barking Park Bus Garage / Faircross
- Barking station
- Vicarage Field Shopping Centre
- Creekmouth Waverley Gardens
- Thames View Christ Church
- Dagenham Choats Road
- Dagenham Dock Terminus for Dagenham Dock station

Route EL3 operates via these primary locations:

- Little Heath Chadwell Heath Lane
- King George Hospital
- Goodmayes station
- Barking Park Bus Garage / Faircross
- Barking station
- Vicarage Field Shopping Centre
- Creekmouth Waverley Gardens
- Creekmouth Thames Road
- Barking Riverside Riverside Centre
- Barking Riverside station (limited service)
- Barking Riverside Northgate Road (limited service)

== Vehicles ==
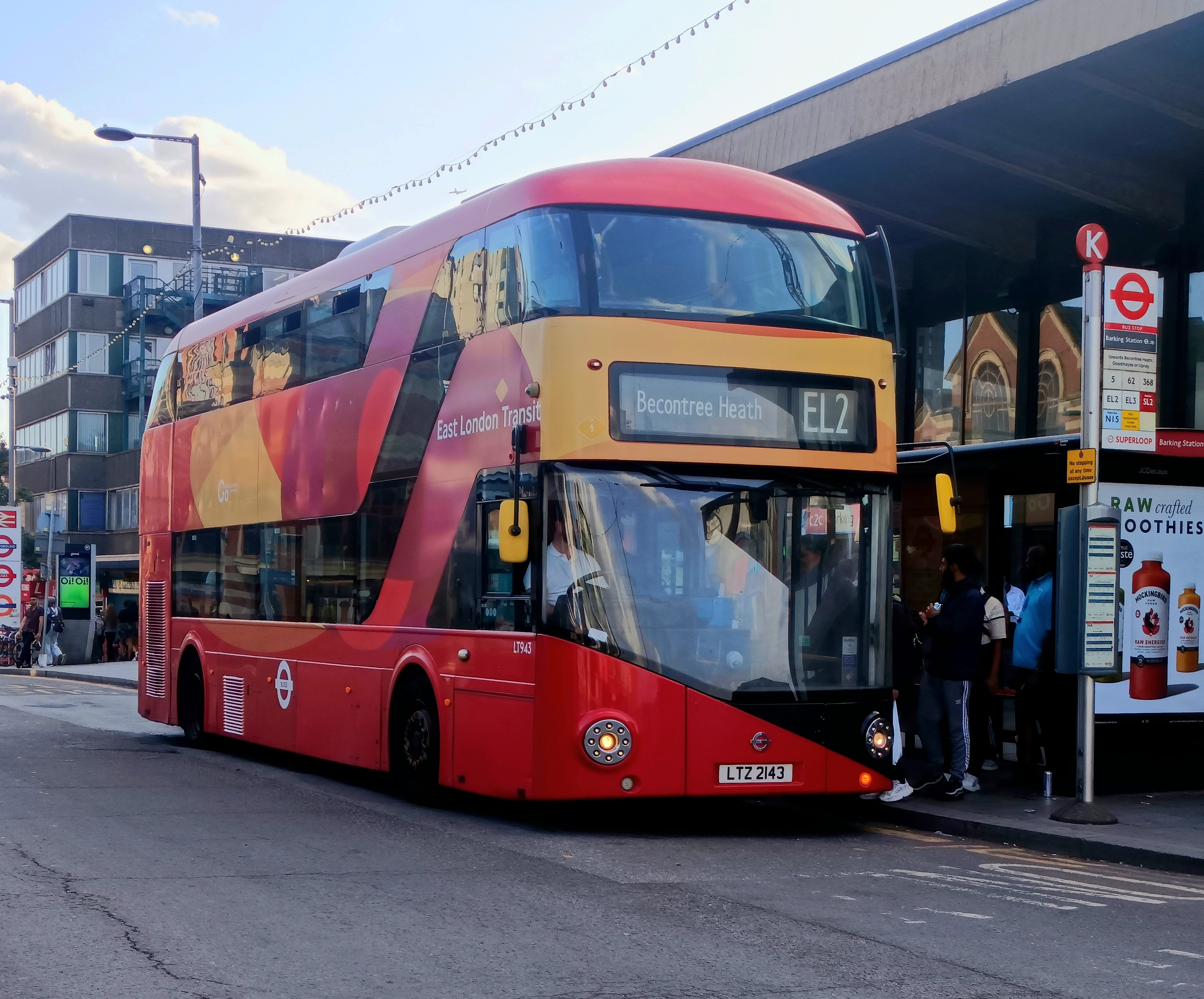
East London Transit liveried New Routemaster on route EL2 at Barking station in July 2025

All services are operated by Go-Ahead London subsidiary Blue Triangle using New Routemasters from River Road garage. In February 2017, Blue Triangle commenced a new contract on routes EL1 and EL2 along with new route EL3 (which replaced the similarly routed 387). These routes gradually introduced New Routemasters, with some of them painted in East London Transit livery, which is coloured in different accents of red and mandarin orange.

== Future developments ==
=== Proposed destinations ===
Early proposals for extensions have included Gants Hill for the Central line, Rainham, Barkingside, Romford, Elm Park and Collier Row and Harold Wood. Havering London Borough Council has voiced support for the extension to Rainham through London Riverside.

In a bus network development paper from 2016, a new route EL4 is proposed between Barking Riverside station and Becontree Heath Leisure Centre via Becontree Underground station. In a council meeting in July 2023, Barking & Dagenham council had talked with TfL about extending the proposed route to Romford.

Additional proposals include services to Gallions Reach for the Docklands Light Railway, East Ham, Silvertown and Stratford.

=== Thames Gateway Transit ===
The East London Transit formed part of a plan for a much larger Thames Gateway Transit service, which would use the Thames Gateway Bridge to connect to the Greenwich Waterfront Transit on the south side of the River Thames. However, construction of the bridge and the Greenwich busway was cancelled in 2008.

== See also ==
- London Superloop
