= Riverside School, Barking =

Coordinates: 51.5244°N 0.1105°E

Riverside Campus

Location
- Renwick Road; Barking, Essex, IG11 0FU; England

Information
- Type: Free school
- Motto: Excellence for all
- Established: 1 September 2013
- Local authority: Barking and Dagenham London Borough Council
- Trust: PARTNERSHIP LEARNING
- Department for Education URN: 139791 Tables
- Ofsted: Reports
- Headteacher: Andrew Roberts
- Gender: Mixed
- Age: 11 to 18
- Enrolment: 1,200+
- Houses: Amazon; Ganges; Nile; Congo
- Colours: Turquoise and Maroon
- Website: http://riversidecampus.com/

Riverside Campus (also known as Riverside School) is an 11-18 mixed, secondary free school and selective sixth form situated in Barking Riverside, London, England. It is one of the largest schools in the London Borough of Barking and Dagenham, with currently over 1,200 students on roll.

The school opened in September 2013 for years 7–11, and the sixth form (years 12–13) opened in 2017.

== History ==
The school opened in September 2013, with a small intake of students from school years 7 to 11. Its first location was at 40 Thames Road in Barking, England.

In September 2017, the school had relocated to a £44 million campus in Barking Riverside, as the United Kingdom's largest free school. The campus is a 23,000sqm five-story building, and is able to accommodate up to 2,465 children from 0–19 years. The school integrated provision for nursery, primary and sixth form pupils and furthermore introduced a special educational needs (SEN) school for Riverside Bridge.

== Facilities ==
The school's campus features a wide range of facilities.

- A wide indoor sports hall.
- A dance studio.
- A fitness suite, containing a variety of gym equipment with stationary bicycles, treadmills, indoor rowers, power racks, and more.
- Specialised laboratories for the sciences, multiple computer labs/rooms, design and technology rooms and music rooms.
- Four outdoor multi-use game areas (MUGAs), table tennis courts and a large football pitch that runs across the campus.

Alongside these, the school maintains 5 floors (0 to 4) each with their own dedicated subject classes, represented with colours: blue (Floor 0), orange (Floor 1), green (Floor 2), yellow (Floor 3) and grey (Floor 4), all maintaining several computer rooms.

== Curriculum ==
The school organises students into separate buildings depending on their "school"; namely Riverside Bridge, Riverside Primary and Riverside Secondary, however are all connected in the same campus, and differ in term dates and their curriculums.

=== Secondary school curriculum ===
The school is independent from the national curriculum, and instead follow their own curriculum for their secondary school:

- Students are placed into 1 of 5 form brackets (R, I, V, E, S), which is based on their Key Stage 2 (KS2) performance, mainly decided from their National Curriculum assessment results (SATs).
- Riverside School maintains a 1-week timetable, featuring 25 x 60-minute taught lessons, plus a 20-minute assembly each day.
- PSHE/citizenship/RS are delivered through Civics (one lesson per week for years 7–10).
- Science provision in year 11 for those students undertaking triple science is increased to 6 hours each week, providing 2 discrete hours for chemistry, physics and biology.
- Students that play a musical instrument receive personal tuition provided by the school's peripatetic music tutors each week.

==== Key Stage 4 ====
At Key Stage 4 (year 9), students are required to study core GCSE subjects, involving AQA English, AQA Sciences, Edexcel Mathematics and AQA Spanish Language (E and S excluded). They also must study either AQA GCSE Physical Education or Edexcel BTEC Level 1/2 First Award In Sport.

Students also have the following option choices as part of their GCSE option choices:

- OCR Computer Science
- AQA History
- AQA Spanish (E and S only)
- Edexcel Music
- AQA Media Studies
- OCR Geography
- Edexcel Photography
- Edexcel Art
- As vocational option choices - WJEC Hospitality and Catering Level 1/2 Award, OCR Creative iMedia or Edexcel BTEC Performing Arts.

== Results ==
In the 2018 Department for Education school league tables, Riverside Campus ranked the highest achieving school in Barking and Dagenham at GCSE, with a Progress 8 well above average score of 0.91, an Attainment 8 score of 55.5, 80% of students entering EBacc, and an EBacc average point score of 5.11. However, as of 2019, the school had a below average ranking for A-Levels, but over time the school has had an outstanding change in their A-Level results, with students progressing onto higher education at Russell Group universities and a low number of students being offered Oxbridge places.

As of 2019, the school currently stands as one of the top 80 schools in the United Kingdom represented by the school league tables.

== Uniform ==
Secondary school students are required to wear a maroon blazer with the embroidered school logo and a grey polo shirt with the embroidered school logo. Trousers must be black and classic-cut, and skirts must be black and below the knee. Socks or tights must be plain black, and flat, black shoes with a closed toe and heel are mandatory.

Primary and Bridge school students are required to wear a navy blue cardigan or jumper with the embroidered school logo, a grey polo shirt with the embroidered school logo and black or grey trousers. Black shoes are mandatory with the uniform. The uniform for the primary school differs depending summer or winter season.

== Standards ==
The school received a 'Good' rating from Ofsted in 2015 and 2019.

In September 2020, the school was interviewed and looked into by the BBC, with year 11 and 13 examinations taking place following school openings after the British national lockdown, presenting what social distancing measures the school has established.
