= Thames Gateway Transit =

Pair of proposed segregated bus schemes

The Thames Gateway Transit was the collective name of two planned segregated bus schemes planned and partially implemented by Transport for London (TfL) in the east London section of the Thames Gateway redevelopment zone in England. They were:

- East London Transit, which opened in phases from 2010 and 2013
- Greenwich Waterfront Transit, which was cancelled in 2009

The Thames Gateway Bridge that would have connected the two systems was cancelled in 2008.

== East London Transit ==
East London Transit (ELT) is a part-segregated bus rapid transit, operated as part of the London Buses network. The East London Transit opened in phases between 2010 and 2013, designed to meet the existing and anticipated demand for public transport in East London caused by the Thames Gateway redevelopment. Originally, the ELT formed part of the Thames Gateway Transit proposal, which would use the Thames Gateway Bridge to connect to the Greenwich Waterfront Transit on the south side of the River Thames.

== Greenwich Waterfront Transit ==
Following construction of 1.8km of dedicated bus lanes along the Greenwich Peninsula to connect to North Greenwich station and the Millennium Dome in 2000, Greenwich Waterfront Transit was proposed by TfL to connect development sites around the Millennium Dome, Charlton, Woolwich and Thamesmead on dedicated bus lanes. Originally proposed to use optically guided trolleybuses, the system would have operated as part of the London Buses network. Transport for London announced at the end of March 2009 that the Greenwich Waterfront Transit scheme would not proceed.

== Thames Gateway Transit ==
It was envisaged that the two schemes, while promoted separately by Transport for London, would have formed a single network connected by the Thames Gateway Bridge, which was cancelled by then Mayor of London Boris Johnson in 2008.
