= Dagenham Dock =

Industrial district in London, England

Coordinates: 51.525353°N 0.143144°E

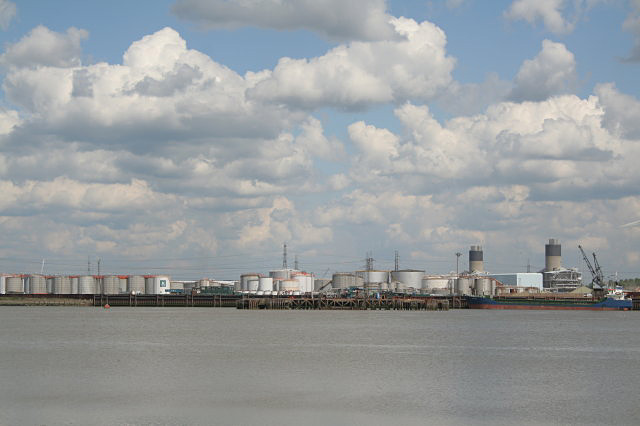
- Dagenham Dock viewed from the River Thames

- Location within Greater London
- Population: 7,855 (Rylands Estate & Dagenham Dock MSOA, E02000021, 2011 Census)
  - Charing Cross: 11.6 mi (18.7 km) W
- London borough: Barking & Dagenham
- Ceremonial county: Greater London
- Region: London
- Country: England
- Sovereign state: United Kingdom
- Post town: DAGENHAM
- Postcode district: RM9
- Dialling code: 020
- Police: Metropolitan
- Fire: London
- Ambulance: London
- UK Parliament: Dagenham and Rainham
- London Assembly: City and East

Dagenham Dock is an industrial district in the London Borough of Barking and Dagenham in London, England. It is located in the south of Dagenham and is on the River Thames. It was once the site of a large coaling port and continues to be the location of a small terminal licensed to handle coal off-loading. Today the site is used for a number of river-related operations including a 25-acre (100,000 m^{2}) TDG (now XPO Logistics) depot with around 200 tanks for the storage of petrol, distillates, aviation fuel, biofuels, tallow, ethanol, fertilisers, and urea.

== History ==
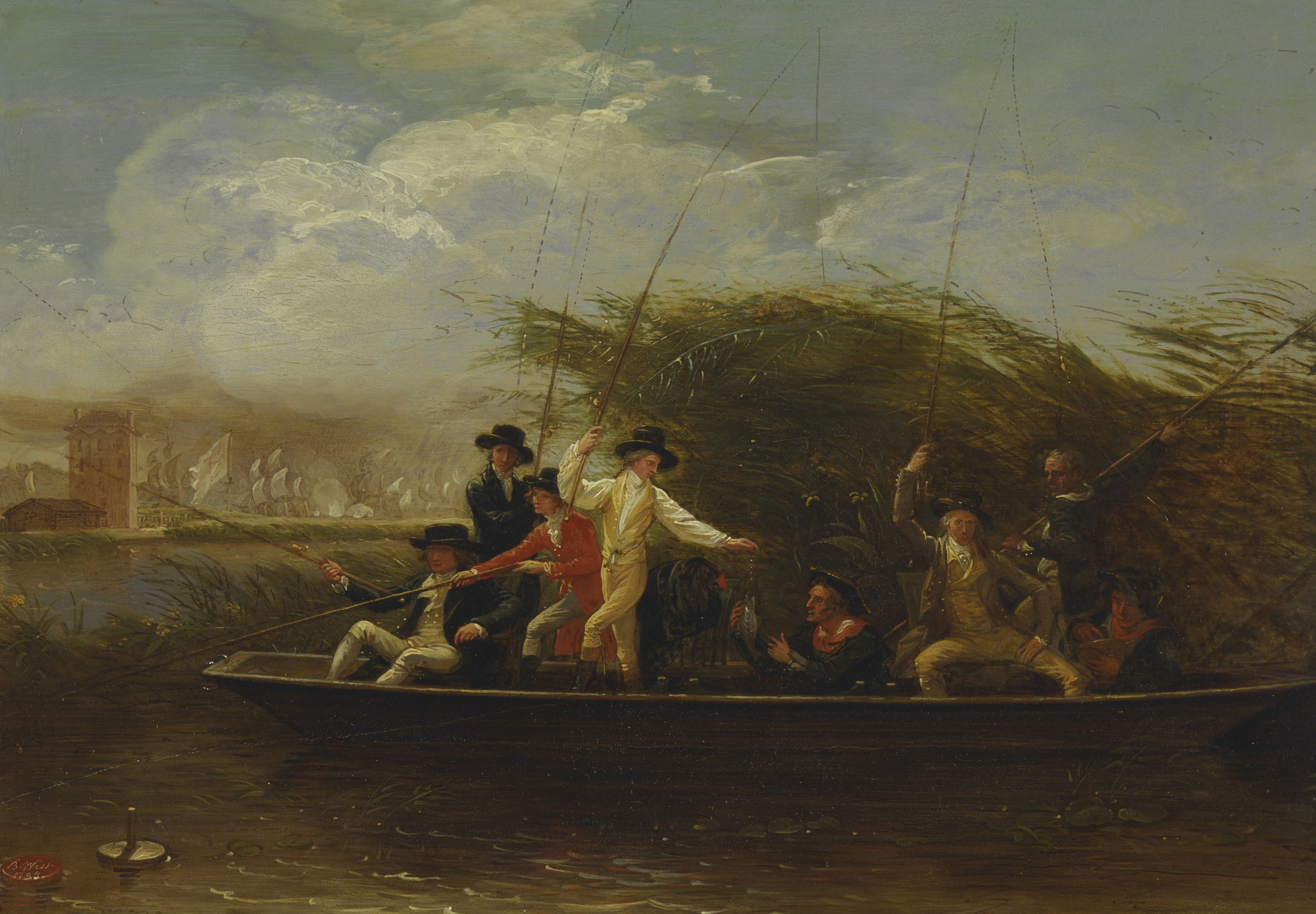
Gentlemen Fishing, a 1794 painting by Benjamin West displaying a fishing expedition in the old Dagenham Breach

Dagenham (Thames) Dock Act 1855
- Act of Parliament
- Parliament of the United Kingdom
- Long title: An Act to authorize the Construction of a Dock on the North Side of the River Thames, to be called "The Dagenham (Thames) Dock."
- Citation: 18 & 19 Vict. c. clxii

Dates
- Royal assent: 23 July 1855

Text of statute as originally enacted

Dagenham (Thames) Dock Act 1862
- Act of Parliament
- Parliament of the United Kingdom
- Long title: An Act for extending the Time for the Purchase of Lands and the Completion of the Works authorized by "The Dagenham Thames Dock Act, 1855," and for other Purposes.
- Citation: 25 & 26 Vict. c. ccxiii

Dates
- Royal assent: 7 August 1862

Dagenham (Thames) Dock Act 1866
- Act of Parliament
- Parliament of the United Kingdom
- Long title: An Act to enable the Dagenham (Thames) Dock Company to acquire additional Lands, and to enlarge their Undertaking, and to provide Abattoirs and other Conveniences; to amend the Dagenham (Thames) Dock Acts, 1859 and 1862; and for other Purposes.
- Citation: 29 & 30 Vict. c. xlvi

Dates
- Royal assent: 18 May 1866

Dagenham (Thames) Dock Company's Act 1870
- Act of Parliament
- Parliament of the United Kingdom
- Long title: An Act for facilitating the Sale and Transfer of the Property or Undertaking of the Dagenham (Thames) Dock Company, in liquidation; and for other purposes.
- Citation: 33 & 34 Vict. c. clxii

Dates
- Royal assent: 9 August 1870

Text of statute as originally enacted

The dock was constructed at the site of Dagenham Breach, an area of flooded marsh caused by the breaching of the sea wall in 1707, and repeatedly flooded in the 18th-century. After a number of failed attempts, in 1865 Sir John Rennie built a jetty and a branch railway, but the Dagenham (Thames) Dock Company failed financially. The site was acquired and Dagenham Dock was constructed over 30 acres (120,000 m^{2}) from 1887 by Samuel Williams. Historic records of Samuel Williams & Sons and John Hudson Ltd are held at Barking and Dagenham Archive Service, Valence House Museum although the full collection has not yet been fully catalogued.

Early in the 20th-century, HMS Thunderer, the last major warship built on the Thames, was fitted out at a new jetty, still known as the Thunderer Jetty.

=== Thames Deep Water Dock ===
Thames Deep Water Dock Act 1881
- Act of Parliament
- Parliament of the United Kingdom
- Long title: An Act to authorise the construction and maintenance of a Dock, and other Works in connexion therewith, in the parish of Dagenham, in the county of Essex.
- Citation: 44 & 45 Vict. c. cxlii

Dates
- Royal assent: 18 July 1881

Text of statute as originally enacted

Thames Deep Water Dock Act 1891
- Act of Parliament
- Parliament of the United Kingdom
- Long title: An Act to revive the powers and extend the periods for the Compulsory Purchase of Lands for and for the completion of the Dock and Works authorised by the Thames Deep Water Dock Act 1881 and for other purposes.
- Citation: 54 & 55 Vict. c. lxxiv

Dates
- Royal assent: 3 July 1891

Text of statute as originally enacted

Thames Deep Water Dock Act 1901
- Act of Parliament
- Parliament of the United Kingdom
- Long title: An Act to revive the powers and extend the periods for the compulsory purchase of lands for and for the completion of the dock and works authorised by the Thames Deep Water Dock Act 1881 and for other purposes.
- Citation: 1 Edw. 7. c. xvii

Dates
- Royal assent: 2 July 1901

Text of statute as originally enacted

In July 1881, an act of Parliament, the Thames Deep Water Dock Act 1881 (44 & 45 Vict. c. cxlii), incorporated the Thames Deep Water Dock Company. The company was intended to build a deep-water dock at Dagenham, downstream of the heavily congested existing docks.

The company hired renowned civil engineer John Abernethy, alongside the Glasgow firm Bell & Miller, to design a highly modern, advanced dock infrastructure.

The East and West India Dock Company obtained permission for an alternative deep water dock further downstream, at Tilbury. This meant the Thames Deep Water Dock Company struggled to raise money, and time available for it to compulsorily purchase land was extended twice, first by the Thames Deep Water Dock Act 1891 (54 & 55 Vict. c. lxxiv) and then by the Thames Deep Water Dock Act 1901 (1 Edw. 7. c. xvii), finally expiring in July 1905.

== Wholesale market ==
Barking Reach Power Station was constructed between 1992 and 1995 on Chequers Lane, and was the first major generating station to be built in London for many years. Decommissioning of the power station started in 2018.

In December 2018, the City of London Corporation acquired Barking Power Ltd along with the Barking Reach Power Station site. The historic City of London Corporation is obliged to provide wholesale markets through legislation enacted in the Victorian era. It proposed to relocate Billingsgate Fish Market (currently in Poplar), Smithfield Meat Market (in Central London) and New Spitalfields Market (currently in Leyton) to a new consolidated site.

The corporation considered potential sites in Silvertown, Fairlop, Thurrock and Dagenham Dock and the possible expansion of the New Spitalfields site in Leyton. The Barking Reach Power Station site was selected in April 2019. In March 2021, Barking and Dagenham Council gave outline planning permission for the City of London Corporation proposals. On 28 November 2022, the corporation submitted a private bill to allow the relocation of Smithfield and Billingsgate markets.

In February 2023, Havering Council attempted to use the 1247 market rights of Romford Market to block the opening of the consolidated wholesale market to the general public.

The new consolidated market was expected to become operational in 2027/2028. However, in November 2024, the Court of Common Council announced it did not intend to proceed with these plans as they were no longer economically viable; instead, if legislation removing the obligations is approved by Parliament, both Billingsgate Fish Market and Smithfield Market would close in or after 2028 with no replacements, while New Spitalfields Market would continue as a London hub for wholesale fruit and vegetable produce. Then, in December 2025, the Corporation and the Greater London Authority signed a Memorandum of Understanding to relocate both wholesale markets to Albert Island east of London City Airport in Newham, and in June 2026 the GLA started to procure a partner for the £220m markets development.

== Geography ==
The area is located in the London Riverside section of the Thames Gateway zone. It includes the London Sustainable Industries Park, an environmentally sustainable business cluster, and the Dagenham Green development.

East of Dagenham Dock is Hornchurch Marshes, west past The Gores waterway is Barking Riverside, to the south is the River Thames and to the north is the Merrielands Retail Park and the Becontree and Rylands estates.

== Transport ==
London Buses routes 145 and EL2 serve Dagenham Dock. The two bus routes are separated by the railway, with a footbridge to connect them. The routes provide services to destinations such as Barking, Dagenham, and Ilford.

Expansion of the little-used Dagenham Dock railway station is expected due to building development on the land along Choats Road and with the introduction of the East London Transit. This replaced a planned extension on the Docklands Light Railway which instead is now projected to be extended to terminate at Thamesmead.

== See also ==
- Port of London
