= Thames View Estate =

Housing estate in Barking, London

Coordinates: 51.528239°N 0.107597°E

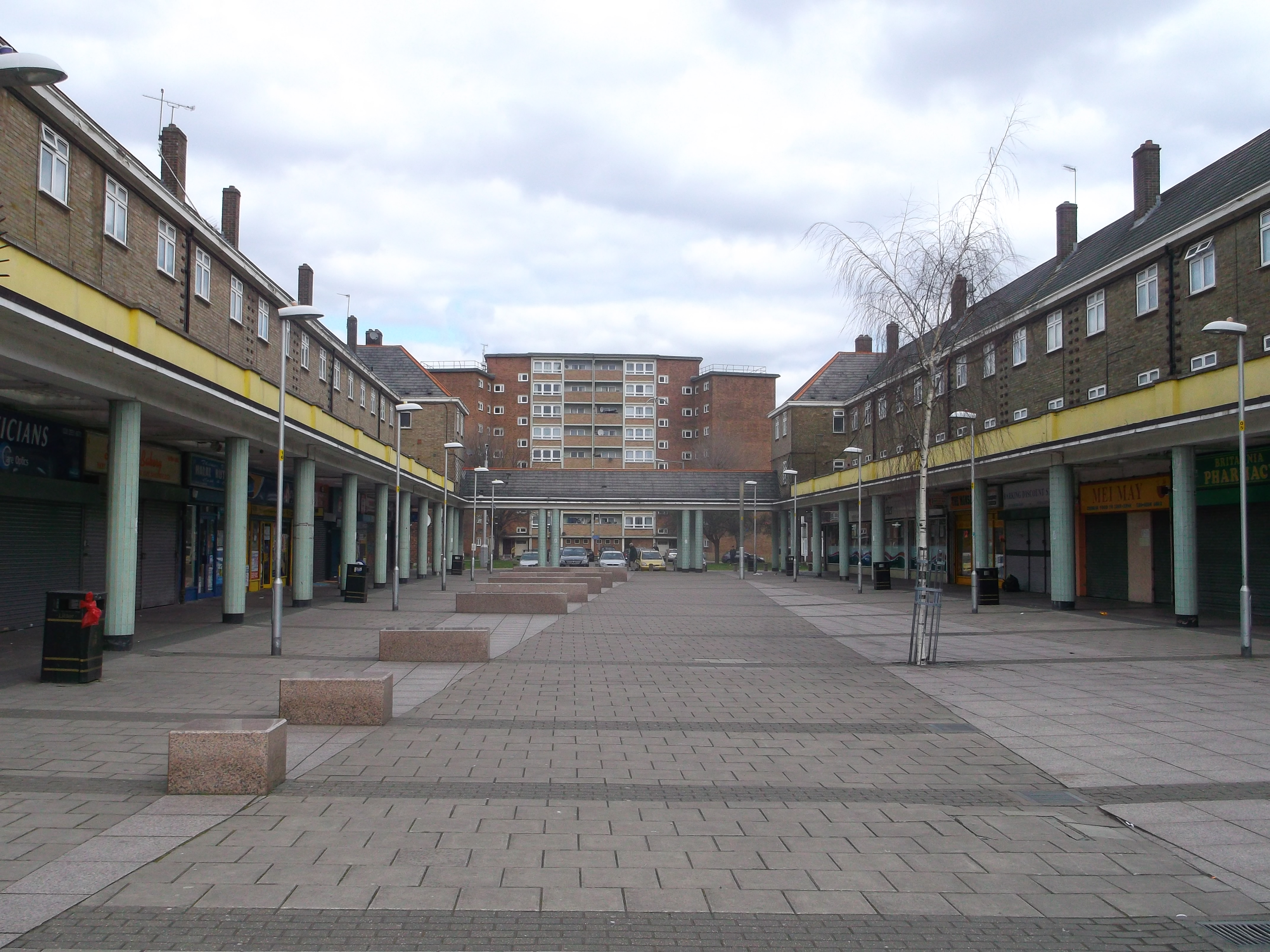
- Shopping precinct on Bastable Avenue

- Location within Greater London
- London borough: Barking & Dagenham
- Ceremonial county: Greater London
- Region: London
- Country: England
- Sovereign state: United Kingdom
- Post town: BARKING
- Postcode district: IG11
- Dialling code: 020
- Police: Metropolitan
- Fire: London
- Ambulance: London
- UK Parliament: Barking
- London Assembly: City and East

Thames View Estate is a large housing estate in Barking and Dagenham in East London, England.

== History ==
Constructed between 1954 and 1960 by Barking Borough Council, it features 2,000 homes rendering it the largest development constructed by the council. The site to the south of Barking was marshland and housing was constructed using piles and raft foundations. The name alludes to the proximity to the River Thames.

== Governance ==
There is a Thames View ward for election of councillors to Barking and Dagenham London Borough Council.

== Geography ==
The built environment is made up of terraced housing, flats and maisonettes. Community facilities, churches (including the Anglican church of Christ Church) and schools are provided, and there is a small pedestrianised shopping precinct on Bastable Avenue, the main thoroughfare. The new development of Barking Riverside is being created adjacent to Thames View.

== Transport ==
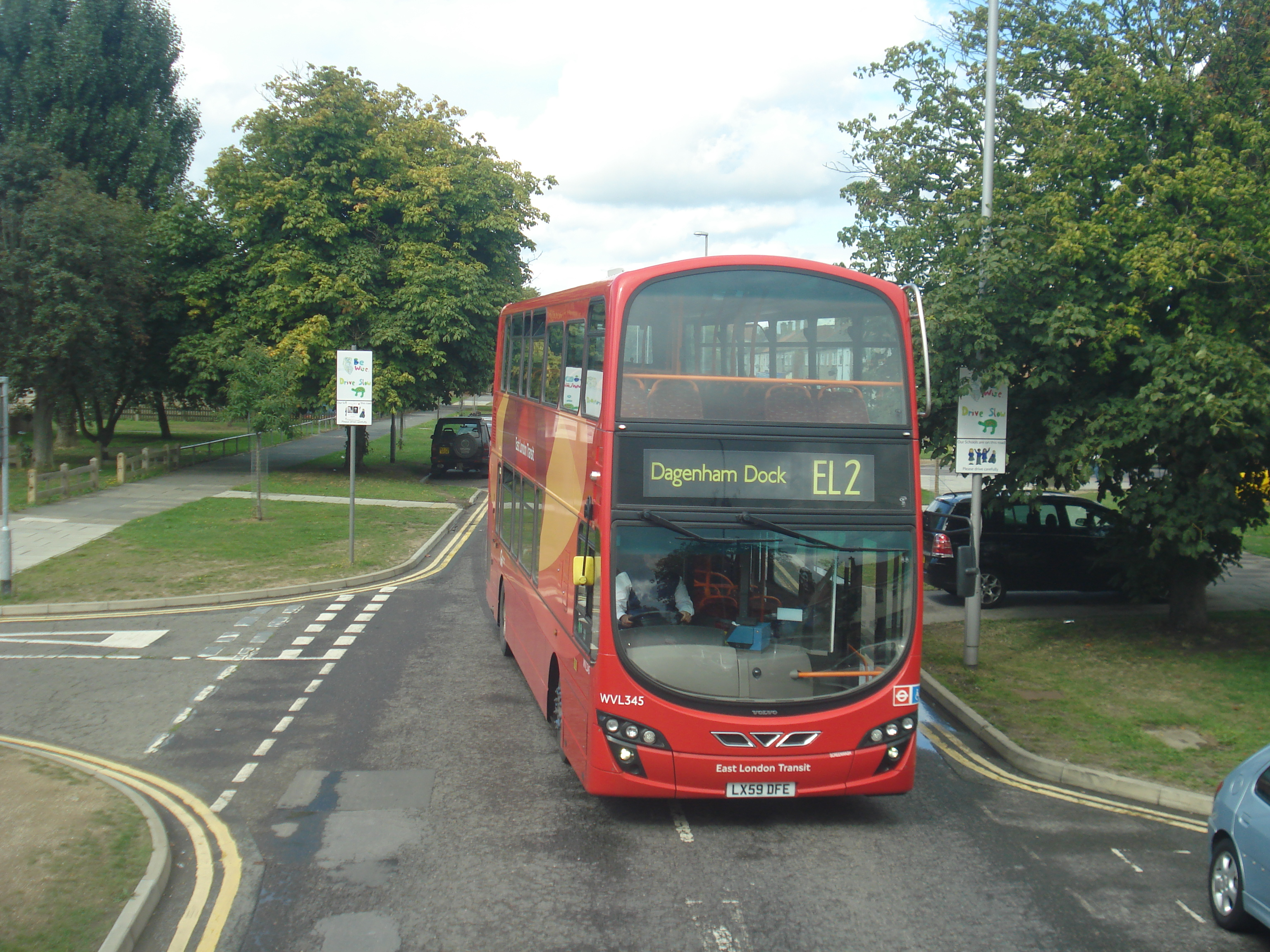
Thames View is served by the East London Transit

Public transport is provided by the East London Transit bus rapid transit service.
