= Barking Riverside =

Area of Barking, London

Coordinates: 51.5228°N 0.1124°E

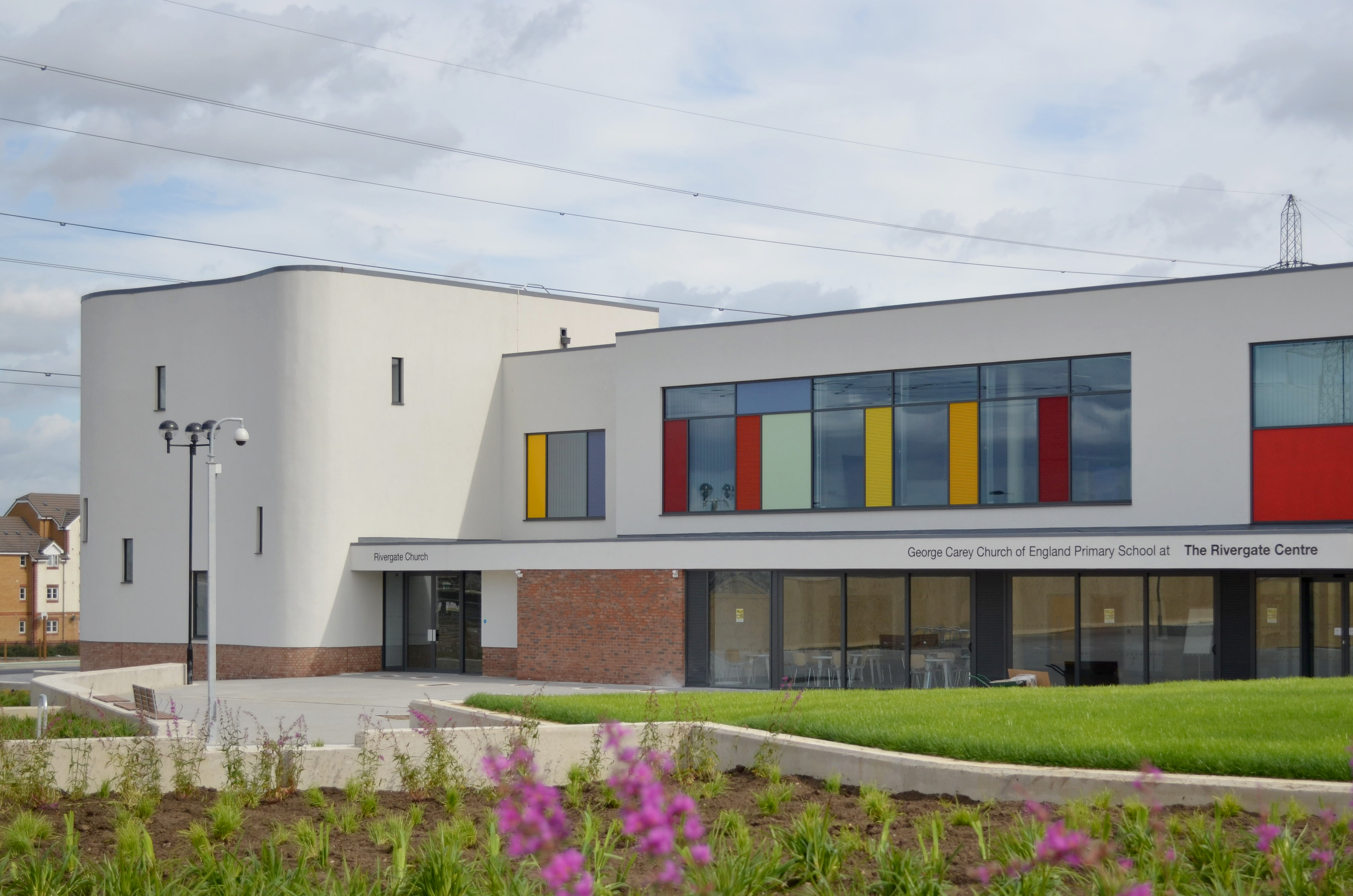
- Rivergate Centre

- Location within Greater London
- OS grid reference: TQ466825
  - Charing Cross: 10.5 mi (16.9 km) W
- London borough: Barking & Dagenham
- Ceremonial county: Greater London
- Region: London
- Country: England
- Sovereign state: United Kingdom
- Post town: BARKING
- Postcode district: IG11
- Dialling code: 020
- Police: Metropolitan
- Fire: London
- Ambulance: London
- UK Parliament: Barking
- London Assembly: City and East

Barking Riverside is a mixed-use development in the area of Barking, east London, England, within the London Borough of Barking and Dagenham. It is being built on land formerly occupied by Barking Power Station, adjacent to the River Thames, and is 10.5 miles (16.9 km) east of Charing Cross. The 440-acre brownfield site has planning permission for 10,800 homes.

As planning restrictions prevented more than 1,200 homes being built without adequate transport links, the London Overground Gospel Oak to Barking line has been extended to Barking Riverside to allow the development to be completed as planned and the new station opened on 18 July 2022.

Between 1995 and 2000, Bellway Homes built 900 homes, and since 2004 the development has been managed by Barking Riverside Ltd, a partnership between GLA Land and Property and Bellway. Building work under this partnership commenced in 2010 and the first homes were occupied in 2012.

In 2016, housing association L&Q bought out Bellway's stake in Barking Riverside Ltd, entering into a joint venture with the GLA to deliver the remaining new homes. There will be three neighbourhood centres and when complete in the 2030s, the development as a whole will have a population of approximately 26,000.

== History ==
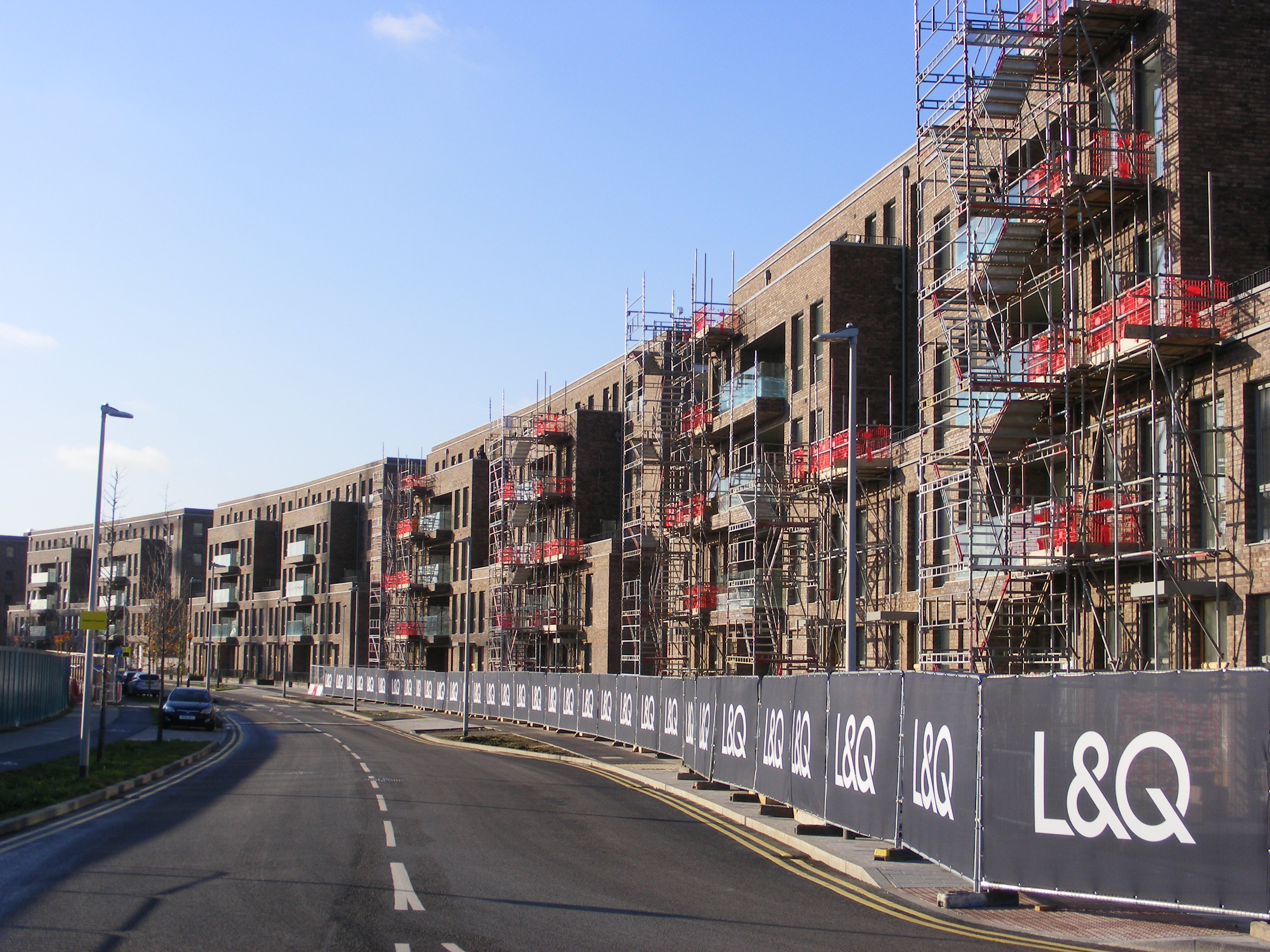
Housing under construction, Fielders Crescent, Barking Riverside

The development is taking place on brownfield land that was formerly occupied by Barking Power Station. Prior to being drained for industrial use, it was tidal marshland. The power station closed in 1981, with a concentration of National Grid pylons, overhead lines, cables and sub stations remaining.

In the early 1990s, the Department of Environment sought brownfield sites in the Thames Gateway area for development. The Barking project started as a public-private venture between the Greater London Authority, English Partnerships and developer Bellway Homes. National Power sold the land to Bellway Homes in 1994. The site has low land value, but the cost of converting it from industrial use caused Bellway to be concerned about profitability. Initially, Bellway constructed 900 homes on the site between 1995 and 2000. Barking Riverside Ltd provided essential infrastructure such as roads, utilities and community facilities.

The site is in the London Riverside section of the Thames Gateway and was within the area of the London Thames Gateway Development Corporation (LTGDC), established in 2004.

In 2004 Barking Riverside Ltd was formed as a joint venture of Bellway Homes and the Homes and Communities Agency (later replaced by GLAP) to deliver the project. Outline planning permission was granted in August 2007, with detailed consent for the first phases given in June 2009. Work started in 2010, and the first homes following the establishment of Barking Riverside Ltd were completed and occupied in 2012.

The development corporation was abolished in 2013 and responsibility passed to GLA Land and Property (GLAP), a subsidiary of the Greater London Authority (GLA). The project was jointly managed by the Homes and Communities Agency until its London operations were folded into the GLA in April 2012.

In 2016, L&Q bought Bellway's 51% stake in the scheme. It will deliver the new homes and infrastructure with the existing joint venture partner the GLA.

In 2017, the first three schools – Riverside School – opened in the area, serving primary, secondary and special needs students – all located on one campus on Renwick Road.

=== Toponymy ===
Barking is an ancient parish name, found in the Domesday Book of 1086. The appellation 'Barking Riverside' refers to the location adjacent to the River Thames. Initially, the name Barking Reach was selected for the area.

== Governance ==
The local authority is Barking and Dagenham London Borough Council. Since 2022, most of the development is within the Barking Riverside ward, which returns three councillors. Some western sections of Barking Riverside are in the Thames View ward, which returns two councillors. For elections to the London Assembly it is part of the City and East constituency. For elections to the UK Parliament it is within the Barking constituency.

As of 2015, the two roads giving access to the development were still privately owned by the developers.

== Geography ==
The 443 acres (1.79 km^{2}) site had planning permission for 10,800 homes and was expected to have a population of approximately 26,000 people. In 2026, Barking Riverside Ltd secured revised outline consent to deliver up to 20,000 homes – almost double the original consent. The site is located between the A13 road and Barking–Rainham railway line to the north and the River Thames to the south. It has 1.2 miles (1.9 km) of riverside frontage. The intention is to create three neighbourhood centres. To the north is the Thames View Estate and to the west is Creekmouth. To the south of Barking Riverside, across the River Thames, is the large housing development of Thamesmead.

== Culture and community ==
The Rivergate Centre, between Minter Road and Handley Page Road, is a community centre that houses halls for hire, the George Carey Primary School, the Rivergate Church and the Riverside School (secondary).

There is also a cafe, a pharmacy and a beauty salon. The local grocery shop on Minter Road was taken over by Co-Op in 2020, re-opening in July 2020 after a refurbishment.

In phases 2 and 3 of the development, there is a provision for a new Health and Leisure Hub including a large family-friendly swimming pool and 150-station gym. This will also incorporate a GP surgery, leisure centre and various community spaces.

== Transport ==
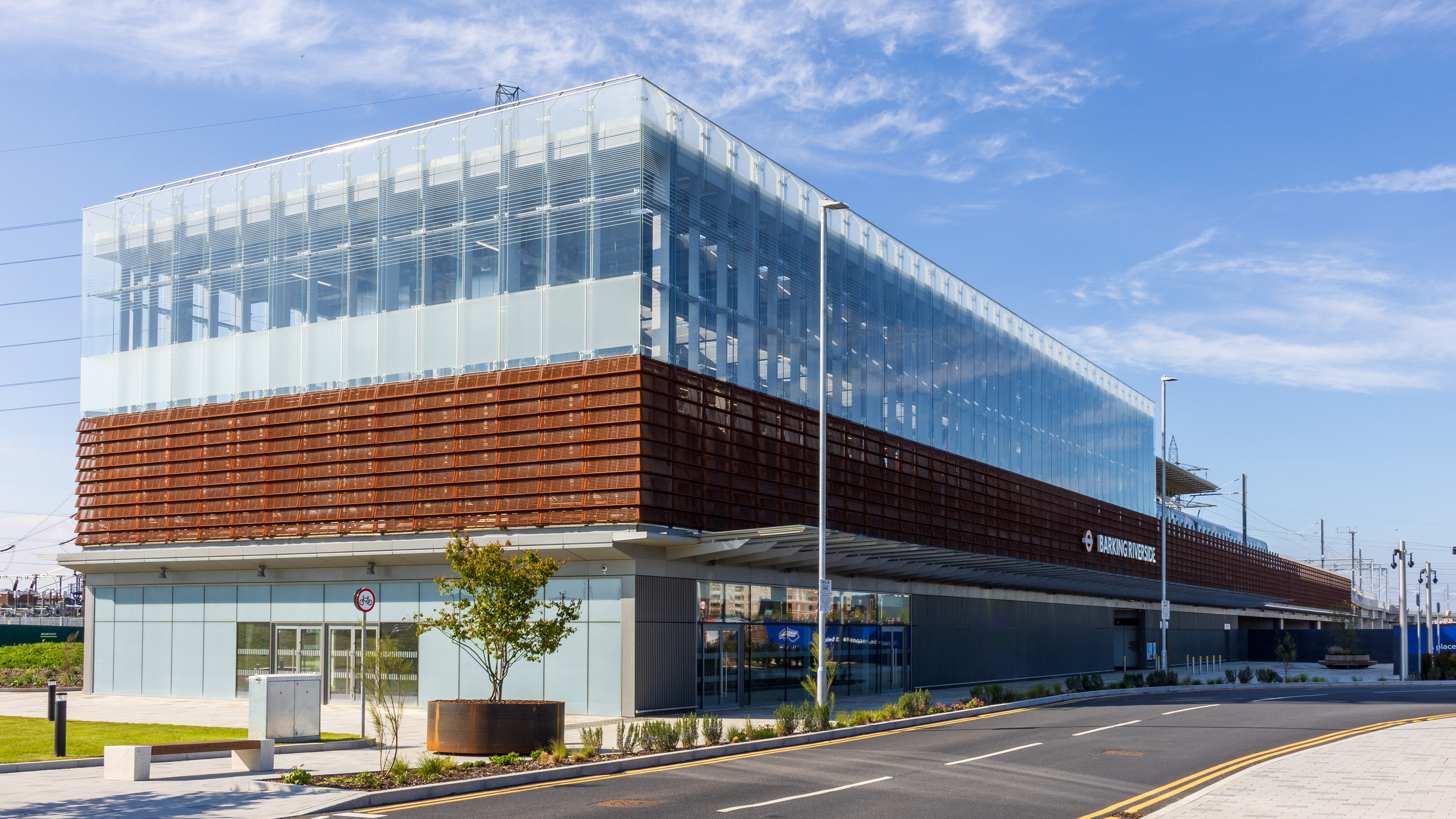
Barking Riverside station

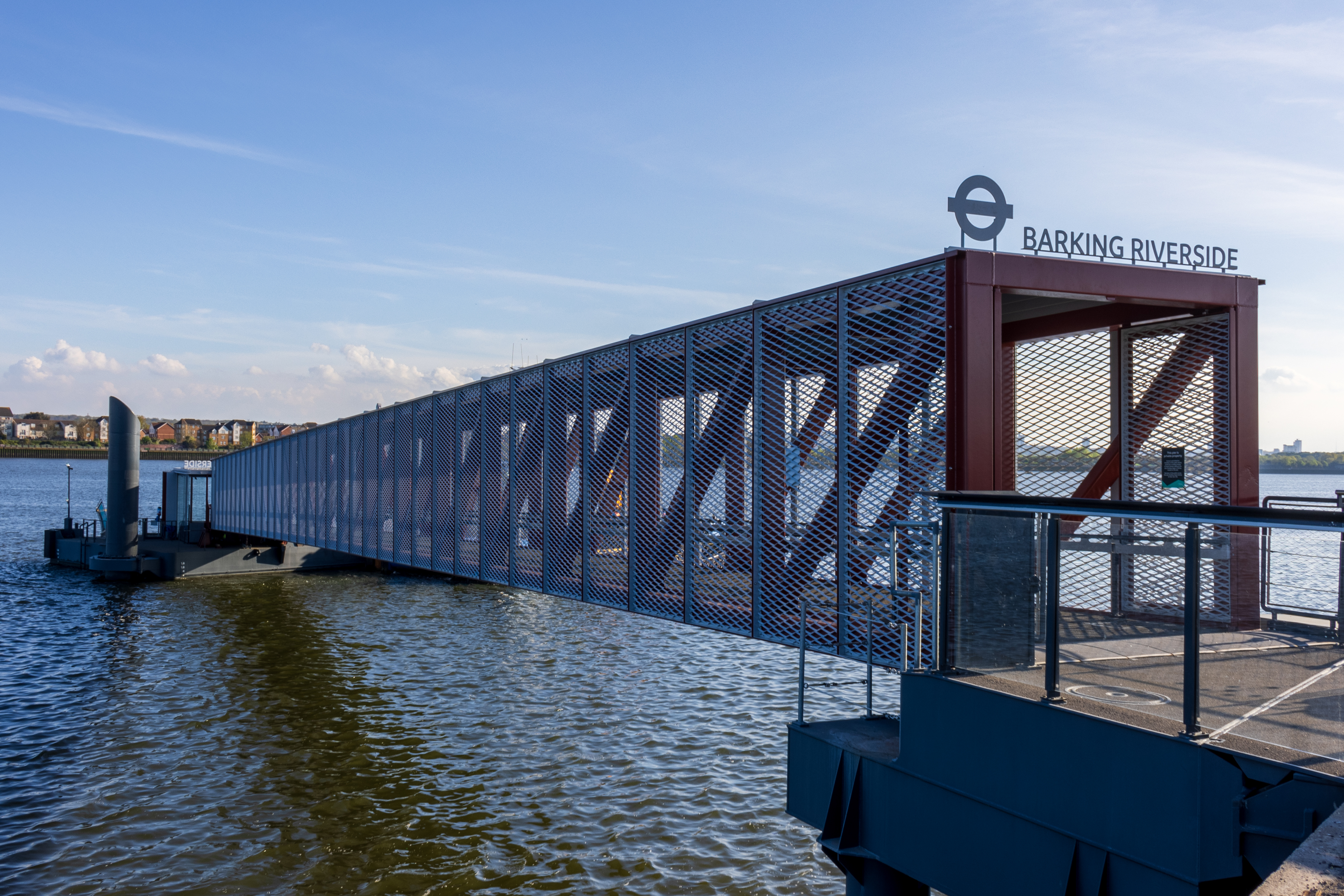
Barking Riverside Pier

=== Bus ===
Barking Riverside is connected to Barking, Goodmayes, Ilford and Dagenham Dock and other places by the East London Transit bus rapid transit services EL1, EL2 and EL3.

=== Overground extension ===
As planning restrictions had prevented more than 1,200 new homes being built before adequate transport links were in place, the area was to be served by an extension of the Docklands Light Railway; however, this was cancelled in 2008. In 2014, it was announced that the London Overground Gospel Oak to Barking line would be extended to Barking Riverside to allow the development to be completed as planned. The new station opened on 18 July 2022.

=== River services ===
On 22 April 2022 the river bus company Thames Clippers began serving an existing pier newly added to the London River Services network. Now called Barking Riverside Pier, it is situated on the north bank of the Thames in what will eventually become the district centre, a short distance from the London Overground station. During the morning and evening peaks, and at weekends, Thames Clippers provides passenger river bus services on the RB1 route to Woolwich Arsenal, Canary Wharf and piers in central London.
