= Dagenham Dock railway station =

National Rail station in London, England

Dagenham Dock
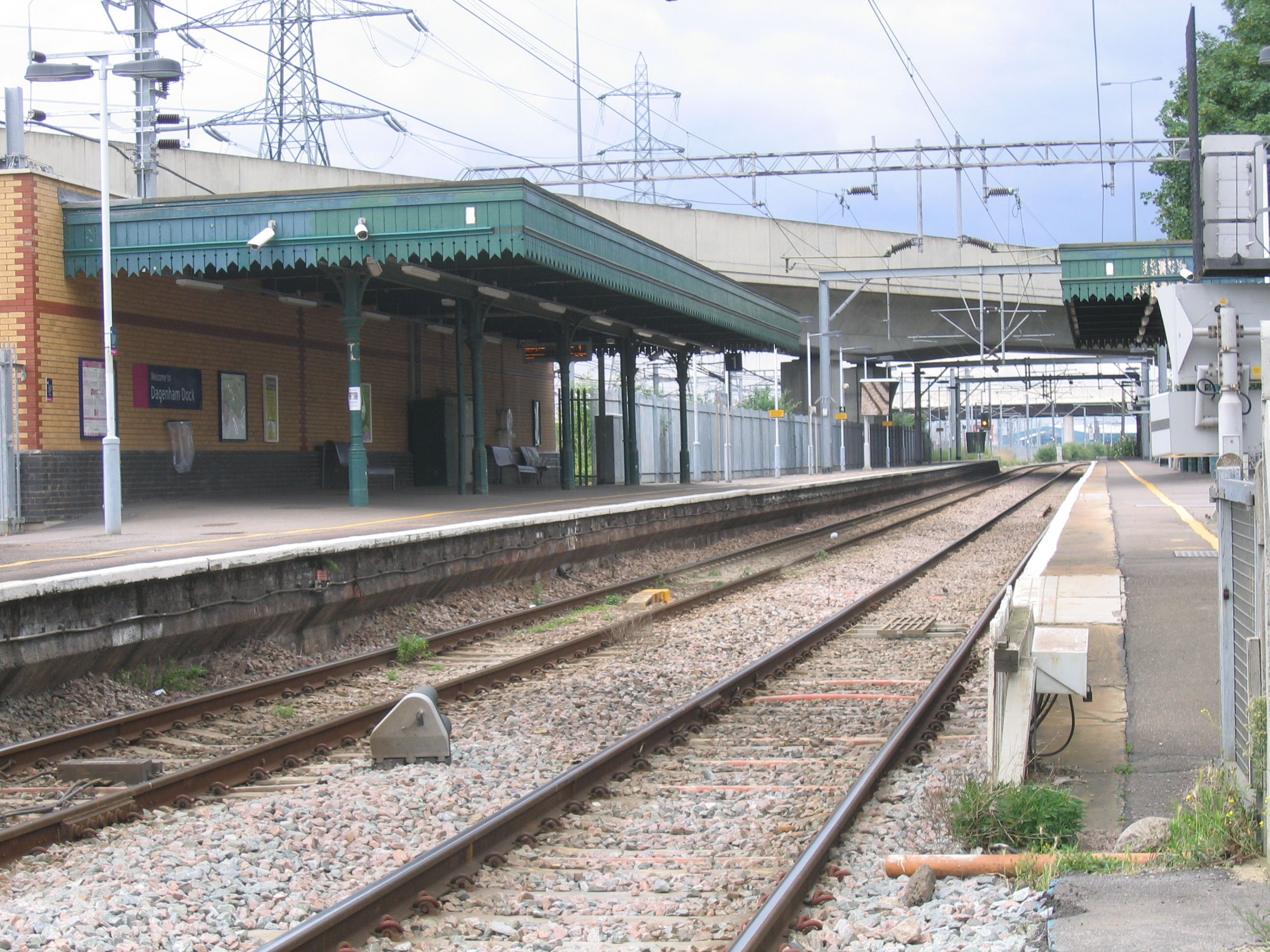
- Interactive map of Dagenham Dock

General information
- Location: Dagenham Dock, Dagenham
- Local authority: London Borough of Barking and Dagenham
- Managed by: c2c
- Owner: Network Rail
- Station code: DDK
- DfT category: E
- Number of platforms: 2
- Accessible: Yes
- Fare zone: 5

National Rail annual entry and exit
- 2020–21: ▼0.181 million
- 2021–22: ▲0.289 million
- 2022–23: ▲0.386 million
- 2023–24: ▲0.401 million
- 2024–25: ▲0.425 million

Railway companies
- Original company: London, Tilbury and Southend Railway
- Pre-grouping: Midland Railway
- Post-grouping: London, Midland and Scottish Railway

Key dates
- 1 July 1908: Opened

Other information
- External links: Departures; Facilities
- Coordinates: 51.5261°N 0.1464°E

Dagenham Dock is a National Rail station in the Dagenham Dock district of Dagenham in the London Borough of Barking and Dagenham, east London. The station is on the Tilbury loop of the London, Tilbury and Southend line, located 10 miles 45 chains (17.0 km) down the line from London Fenchurch Street between Barking to the west and Rainham to the east. The station was opened in 1908 by the London, Tilbury and Southend Railway. The station serves a primarily industrial area adjacent to the River Thames, including the Ford Dagenham site, that is now going through redevelopment as a commercial and residential district. Its three-letter station code is DDK and it is in London fare zone 5. The station and all trains serving it are currently operated by c2c. It is an interchange with the East London Transit bus service.

== History ==
=== Early years (1908–1922) ===
The railway through Dagenham Dock was opened on 14 April 1854 as part of the London, Tilbury and Southend Railway (LT&SR) main line to Tilbury. The railway was separated from the River Thames by Dagenham Marshes and in the 1860s and 1870s there were attempts to establish a dock there.

These came to nothing and 30 acres of land was bought by Samuel Williams and Co. In 1887. They drained the marshes and established a deep water jetty on the river as well as a link to the LT&SR east of Chequers Lane level crossing. An early station was built 200 yards east of Chequers Lane but this appears never to have opened although trains apparently stopped for local fisherman. The company built further jetties along the river and built a rail connected industrial estate.

The station was opened on 1 July 1908 by the London, Tilbury and Southend Railway and was built on land owned by Samuel Williams and Co. (SW&Co) who, as there were few houses in the area that time, wanted a station to bring workers to the industries establishing themselves on their site.

The station had two platforms and the station buildings were on the up side, and were built by SW&Co to an LT&SR specification. The station was located west of Chequer Lane Level Crossing and a signal box was provided to the east on the down side. This controlled the small goods yard and entrance to the exchange sidings used by SW&Co.

Just over four years later in 1912 the Midland Railway bought the LT&SR on 7 August 1912 so Dagenham Dock became a Midland Railway station.

Sometime after the war a private wagon works operated by Wagon Repairers Limited was opened south and east of the station which had access to the up sidings.

=== London Midland and Scottish Railway (1923–1948) ===
Following the Railways Act 1921 the station became the responsibility of the London Midland and Scottish (LMS) Railway from 1 January 1923.

Larger 3-Cylindered 2-6-4Ts designed by William Stanier were introduced in 1934 and seen on passenger services. During World War II many of the 3-cylindered 2-6-4Ts were transferred away from the area and haulage reverted to older LT&SR locomotives, but the 3-cylindered tanks were back before the end of 1945.

Motor manufacturer Ford bought a 244-acre site off SW&Co in 1924 and in 1931 opened the Dagenham Car Plant.

With a growing number of non-rail connected factories opening in the 1930s the LMS extended the goods yard and it was moved eastwards. Ford took over the old goods yard and car loading ramps were built there. Both of these facilities had been set back from the main line to allow for quadrupling.

Just after World War II started in September 1939, the passenger service was reduced as a wartime economy measure. Wartime production at Fords included large numbers of vans and trucks, along with Bren gun carriers and numerous 'special purpose' engines. Agricultural vehicles were also an important element. At one point, the Fordson represented 95% of UK tractor production.

During World War II there were two major incidents at Dagenham Dock. On Saturday October 12, 1940 bombs fell on the line and services were restored on 16 October. On 17 April 1941 a landmine exploded in the sidings damaging 30 wagons.

=== British Railways (1948–1994) ===
Following nationalisation of Britain's railways in 1948, the station transferred under British Railways to the London Midland Region. On 20 February 1949, the whole LTS line was transferred to the Eastern Region, yet despite the organisational changes, the old LTSR still was a distinctive system operated by former LTS and LMS locomotives until electrification.

During the late 1950s the LTS was being electrified and re-signalled and a full electric timetable started operating in June 1962 which was primarily worked by Class 302 EMUs.

At this time passenger numbers declined as car ownership rose as workers preferred driving to the local factories. Local BR public goods services ended in 1964.

SW&CO went into liquidation in 1980 and their sidings closed.

The LTS line and Dagenham Dock station became part of the London and South Eastern sector of British Rail in 1982, and in June 1986 this was rebranded as Network South East (NSE). With the Conservative government of the early 1990s looking to privatise the railways, the operation of the NSE passenger train service was put under the control of a Train Operating Unit.

=== Privatisation era (1994–2025) ===
==== Franchises ====
On privatisation in 1994, infrastructure ownership passed to Railtrack and Prism Rail took over operations of the franchise, marketing the route as LTS Rail. Prism Rail were bought out by National Express in 2000 and in 2002 the line was rebranded as c2c.

Ownership of the infrastructure passed to Network Rail in 2002.

National Express sold the operation of the franchise to Trenitalia in 2017.

The station and all trains serving it are currently operated by c2c and are operated by Class 357 and Class 720/6 EMUs.

A more detailed history of the franchises can be found on the c2c page.

On 20 July 2025 the C2C network was returned to the public sector by the Labour Government.

==== Infrastructure change ====
The signal box was closed in August 1996 when the signalling was taken over by Upminster Signalling Control Centre.

In 1998 a new viaduct crossing over the station site was opened carrying the A13 road (England) to the south of the railway line.

The building of High Speed 1 (HS1) saw a number of changes to the area with the platforms being realigned north. The lines passed behind the up platform and two years later Chequers Lane Level Crossing was closed. The eastern connection into Fords was closed and now three lines south of the HS1 alignment are used for entrance to the Fords factory and a Hansons Aggregate terminal. West of the station on the up side there are two sidings serving Dagenham Cold Store and then the up and down split to go around the Ripple Lane site. Much altered over the years this still has a freightliner terminal and Eurohub.

East of the station the former 1901 goods yard is now an aggregates terminal and Dagenham Down Sidings is now a headshunt for that facility.

== Design ==
The station consists of two side platforms with a small entrance building to the northern (down) platform. Within the station a footbridge connects the platforms. An accessible footbridge with stairs and lifts outside the station connects the northern entrance building with the East London Transit terminal to the south. The external footbridge also provides step-free lift access with the southern (up) platform.

High Speed 1 and some freight tracks run parallel, however these are not directly accessible from the platforms. The elevated A13 road runs above the eastern ends of the platform.

== Location ==
The station is located on Chequers Lane in the Dagenham Dock neighbourhood. London Buses route 145 serves the northern side of the station, while route EL2 operates from the East London Transit terminal to the south of the station.

These bus links connect to nearby areas, such as Barking, Becontree, Dagenham, and Ilford.

== Operations ==
=== Services ===
As of the June 2024 timetable the typical Monday to Friday off-peak service is:

- 2 trains per hour westbound to London Fenchurch Street
- 2 trains per hour eastbound to Grays

=== Ripple Lane ===
The LMS already had built a yard on this site in 1937 because Plaistow was at capacity and there was a need to serve local industries. The down side had eight sidings and a run round loop whilst the up sidings had seven sidings and a run round loop. The main line at this stage ran through the site.

The new marshalling yard was approved by the British Transport Commission act of 1951.

The main line was then split to go around the sides of the new facility to cut out crossing moves at both ends. The yard fully opened on 6 March 1961 and included:.

- Eight reception sidings (controlled by Ripple Lane Signal Box
- The Yard hump – wagons were pushed over the hump by a shunting locomotive and the wagons directed from an adjacent Control Tower into the siding group. Retarders would slow wagons down.
- The fan – sets of sidings leading to the Marshalling Sidings
- 54 double ended marshalling Sidings divided into 8 lettered groups of sidings
- The 54 sidings joined two lines and then fanned out into six lines – This end controlled by Ripple Lane Yard Signal Box.
- The east end entry and exit to the main line and Dagenham Dock station.

Within the yard area Ripple Lane TMD was opened by British Rail in November 1959 and closed in 1993. There was also a Carriage and Wagon repair shop.

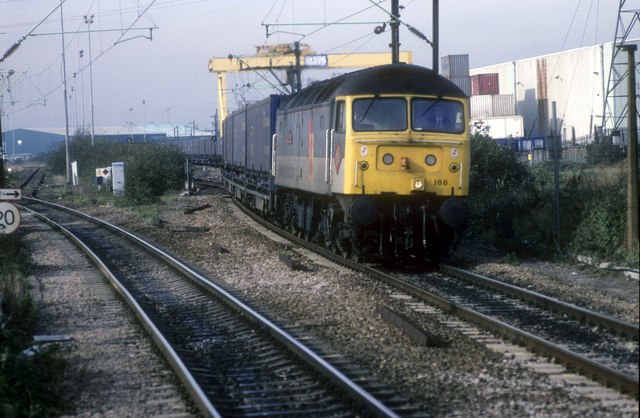
In October 1995, a Class 47 train departs Ripple Lane. The cranes of the depot can be seen in the background.

The hump was abolished and the yard reduced in size in 1968 with a number of marshalling sidings removed partly because more trains were operating as block trains so did not need to call and a general national contraction in freight. On the up side a new Freightliner terminal was built

Situated to the immediate west of the station, the Ripple Lane inter-modal freight depot was originally developed to supply parts from across Europe to the Ford Dagenham plant. Today it has become a base for various continental freight services.

During 2005 to 2009 part of the yard was used by High Speed 1 construction trains as that line ran past Ripple Lane.

In 2009 Stobart Rail commenced a new, weekly refrigerated train service, operated in conjunction with DB Schenker. The 1,100 miles (1,800 km) from Valencia in Spain terminates at Ripple Lane, providing for an alternative to lorries for the import of fresh Spanish produce. The first fully refrigerated goods service to run through the Channel Tunnel, it is then the longest train journey in Europe run by a single operator. On the return journey to Spain, the train carried pallets for CHEP but this ceased running in 2024.

=== Private Sidings and Networks ===
==== Samuel Williams and Co ====
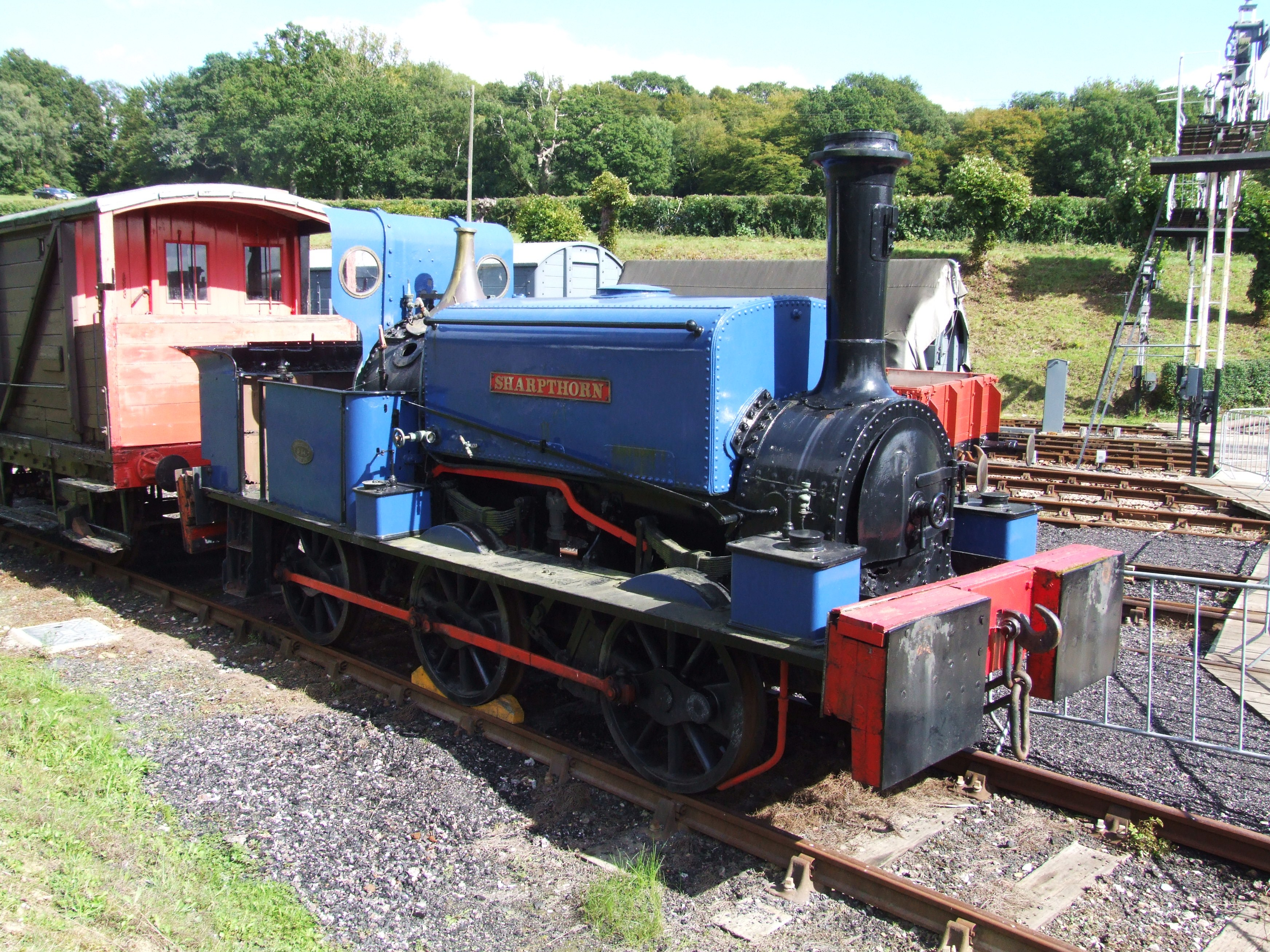
Sharpthorn at the Bluebell railway

The company operated a fleet of steam and diesel engines up to the end of operations in 1972 when the company went into liquidation. Operations changed over the years with coastal coal being a major part of the business in the early years and oil storage in the latter years. They had several rail served jetties, one of which is still extant as a listed structure.

Access to the LT&S was via sidings east of the station on the up side and later they sold land to Ford in 1922 they shared these sidings and the access to their site was realigned.

One of their locomotives, a Manning Wardle 0-6-0ST No. 4 Sharpthorn has been preserved at the Bluebell Railway.

==== Fords ====
In 1931 Fords had three diesel engines based on shunters employed in their USA New Jersey Plant. These 150 hp Bo-Bo were built by British Thompson Houston and these worked over the London, Tilbury and Southend Line to sidings on the downside of the line for which they had LMS approval. They also worked internal trains within the plant moving hot metal and slag ladles. The three locomotives lasted until the 1960s and number 1 has been preserved at the Kent and East Sussex Railway since 1966 and is the oldest diesel-electric locomotive in the UK.

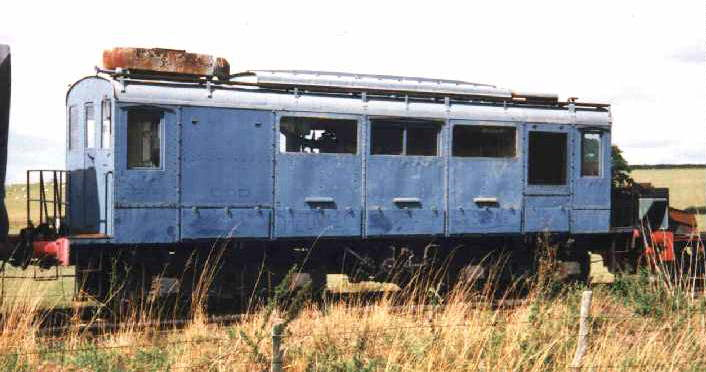
Ford-bth

From 1933 Fords bought Peckett 0-6-0ST tank engines to do the bulk of the shunting in the plant. These were replaced by three British Rail Class 04s and a Class 03 that had been made redundant by the contraction of freight on the national network in the early 1970s.

These were replaced by other industrial diesels as they became life expired although two of them have survived into preservation.

Ford Dagenham which now produces engines only is still connected to the rail network.

== Redevelopment ==
Although the station is relatively poorly served and located in an industrial area, there are plans to redevelop the area as London Riverside. Under these plans the station has become the southern terminus of phase one of the East London Transit and it was proposed that an eastern extension of the Docklands Light Railway would terminate here.

In October 2021, planning permission was given by Barking and Dagenham Council to Inland Homes for 380 new homes and a new public square to the north of the station.

In November 2022, Peabody was given planning permission for the first 935 of 3,500 homes in the Dagenham Green development on part of the former Ford Dagenham site to the northeast of the station.

A consolidated Dagenham Dock wholesale market was proposed for the southeast of the station on the former Barking Reach Power Station site, to become operational in 2027/2028. However, in November 2024, the Court of Common Council announced it did not intend to proceed with these plans as they were no longer economically viable.

Beam Park railway station is planned to be constructed as a new station to the east of Dagenham Dock.

== Notes ==
Preceding station	National Rail	Following station
Barking	c2c London, Tilbury and Southend line	Rainham
