= Henry Fanshawe =

Henry Fanshawe may refer to:

- Henry Fanshawe (1506–1568), English politician, MP for Kingston upon Hull and Queen's Remembrancer
- Henry Fanshawe (1569–1616), English politician, MP for Westbury and Boroughbridge and Queen's Remembrancer
- Henry Fanshawe (1634–1685), English politician, MP for Penryn
