= Barking Power Station =

Power stations in the London Borough of Barking and Dagenham

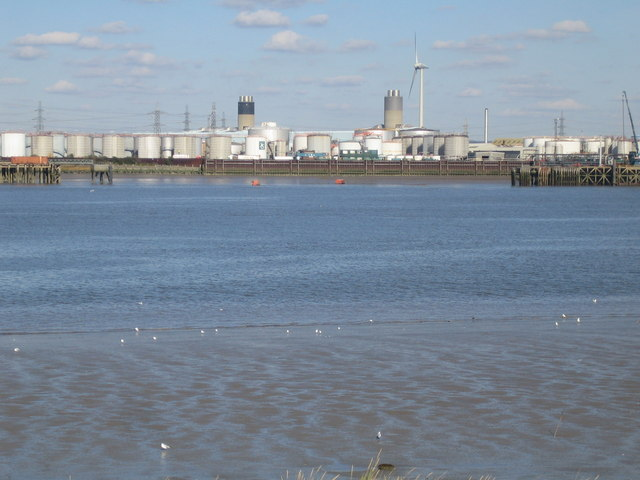
- Barking Reach Power Station; Viewed from the south in October 2007
- Country: England
- Location: Greater London
- Coordinates: 51.5210°N 0.1470°E
- Status: Decommissioned and demolished
- Construction began: 'A' 1925-28; 'B' 1931-39; 'C' 1952-54; Barking Reach 1992-95
- Commission date: 'A' 1925; 'B' 1933; 'C' 1954; Barking Reach 1995
- Decommission date: 'A' 1969; 'B' 1976; 'C' 1981; Barking Reach 2018
- Owner: As operator
- Operators: Barking Town Urban District Council (1897-1927); County of London Electric Supply Company (1925-1948); British Electricity Authority (1948-1955); Central Electricity Authority (1955-1957); Central Electricity Generating Board (1957-1981); Thames Power Services (1995-present)

Thermal power station
- Primary fuel: Coal Oil Natural gas
- Tertiary fuel: Coal
- Chimneys: 'A' 10; 'B' 4; 'C' 2; Barking Reach 2
- Cooling towers: None
- Cooling source: River water

Power generation
- Units operational: 'A' 3 × 40 MW & 1 × 36.75 MW; 'B' 4 × 75 MW; 'C' 3 × 77.5 MW; Barking Reach 1000 MW CCGT
- Units decommissioned: All
- Nameplate capacity: 220 MW & 144 MW

External links
- Commons: Related media on Commons

Barking Power Station refers to a series of power stations at various sites within the London Borough of Barking and Dagenham in east London. The original power station site, of the coal-fired A, B and C stations, was at River Road, Creekmouth, on the north bank of the River Thames. These stations were decommissioned by 1981 and were subsequently demolished. The later gas-fired power station (originally generally known as Barking Reach Power Station) was built further down the Thames near Dagenham Dock in the early 1990s. The site of the former power stations is being redeveloped as Barking Riverside.

== History ==
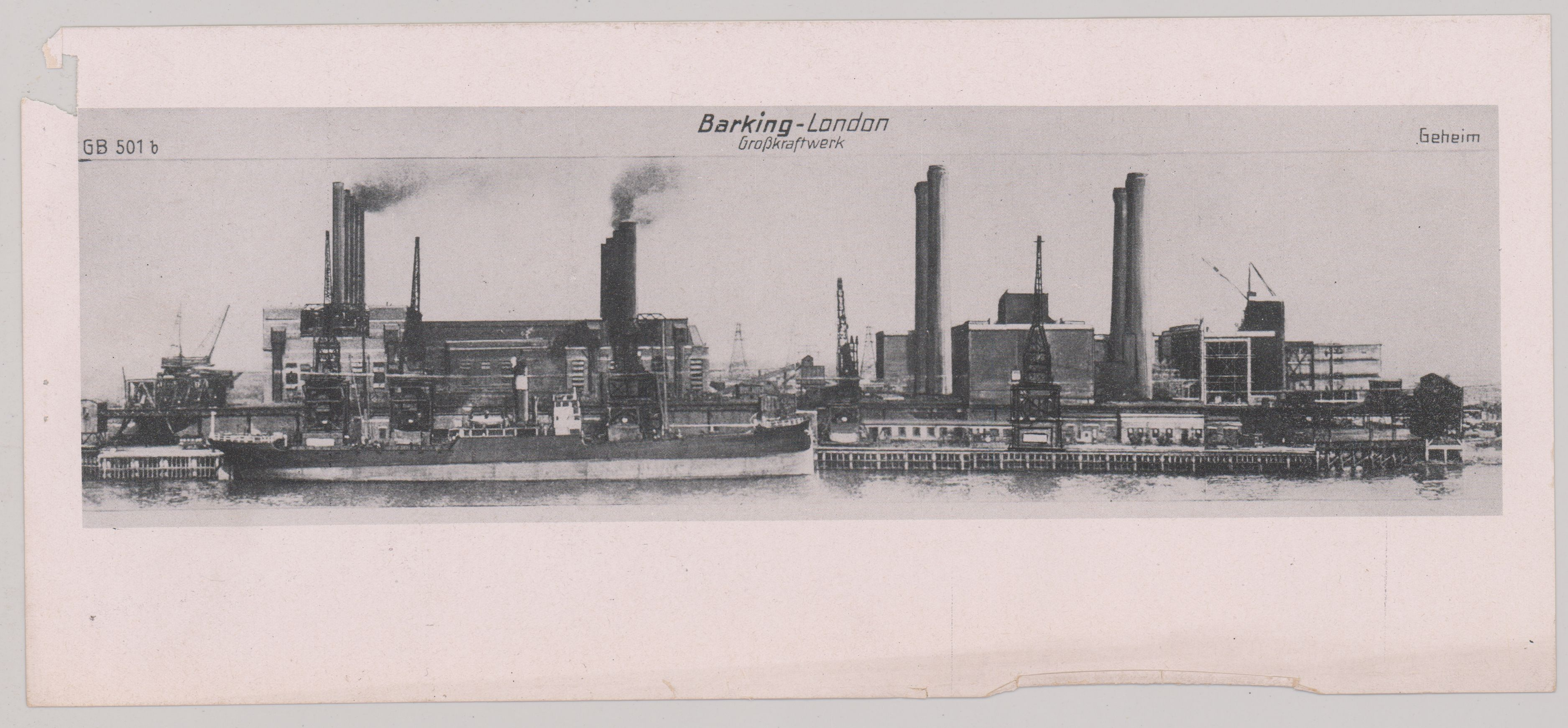
1930s photo

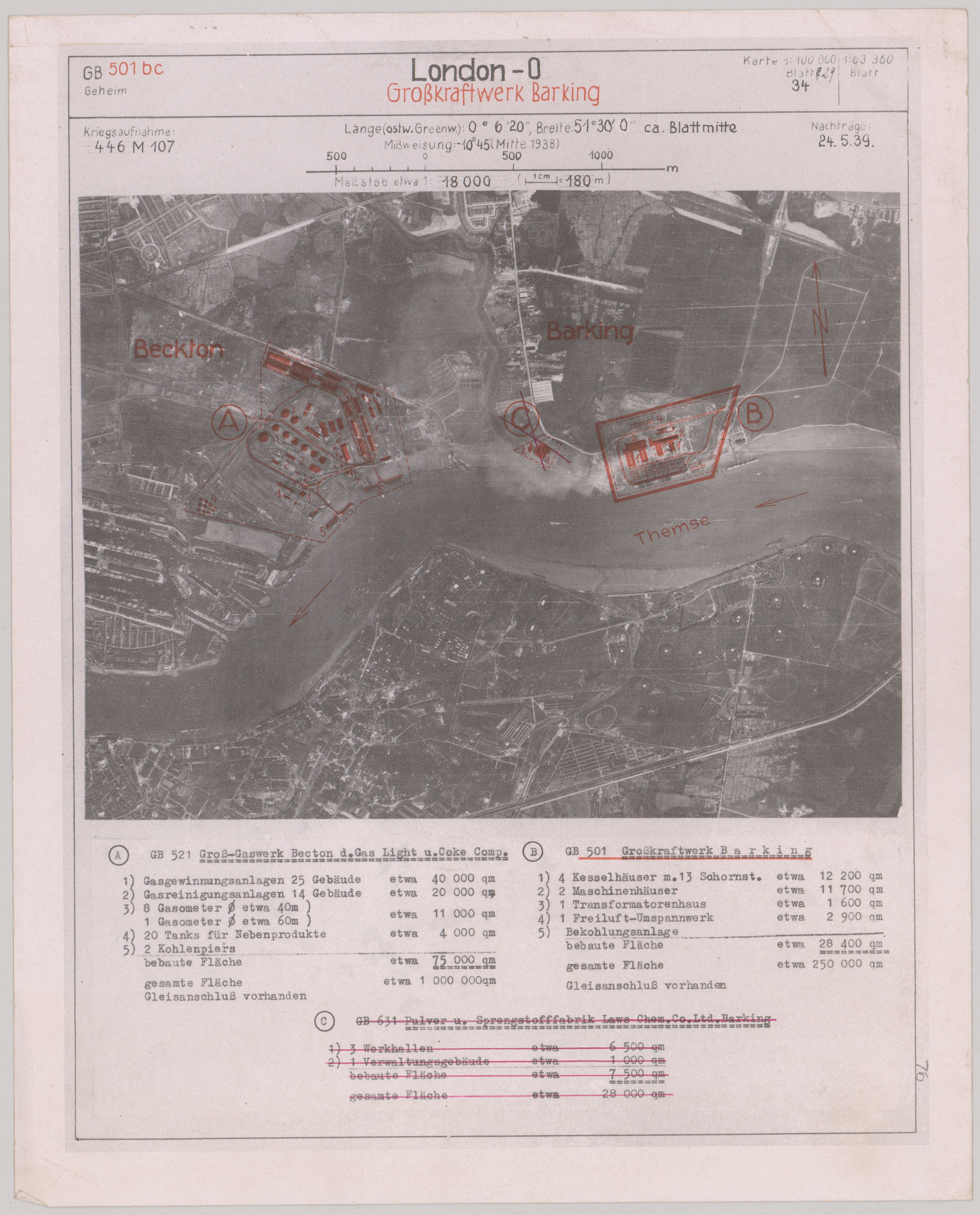
Barking Power Station on a target dossier of the German Luftwaffe, 1939

=== Barking A power station ===
Prior to the construction of Barking A Power Station, Barking Town Urban District Council operated its own small power station near its offices from 1897 until its closure in 1927. In 1920, the County of London Electric Supply Company applied for permission to build a power station at Creekmouth in Barking capable of expansion to 600 MW. The order for the whole of the generating plant for the first half section was placed with C. A. Parsons and Co., Ltd., in 1922, and was for a total aggregate capacity of 120,000 kW. It comprised 2 x 20,000-kW and 2 x40,000-kW (actually 2 x 20MW alternators/turbine) turbo-alternators.

Subsequently in 1926 the A Station was extended to 8 C. A. Parsons turbo-generators (4 × 40 MW and 4 × 20 MW) and 22 boilers, plus 2 dedicated reheat boilers. The two 40 MW sets were cross-compound units and one was the first Parsons set with reheat. These were in two boiler houses, one being all chain grate boilers (6 Babcock & Wilcox and 6 Yarrow) and the other being all pulverised fuel boilers (I.C.L.). The maximum steam capacity of the A station boilers was 1,900,000 lb/hr (239 kg/s). Steam pressure and temperature at the turbine stop valves was 350 psi (24 bar) and 371 °C. Barking Power Station was opened by King George V on 19 May 1925 and was brought into commercial operation on 1 January 1926. In 1927 it took over from the Barking Town Urban District Council station, providing a bulk electricity supply. When completed, the A station was the largest power station in Britain to have been built as a complete station at one time. The Yarrow boilers were scrapped in the early 1950s, their capacity being replaced by steam from the B station via a steam line and suitable regulating equipment. The pulverised fuel boilers were converted to oil firing around 1964. By 1964 there were 3 × 40 MW and 1 × 36.75 MW generators. One of the 40 MW machines was decommissioned in 1966. The A station was decommissioned in 1969.

The site of the power station was chosen for easy delivery of coal from the Thames and by rail, as well as the abundant water supply and space on the site for expansion. A cable tunnel was constructed under the river to supply the south bank with electricity.

=== Barking B power station ===
Barking's B station was opened in 1933 and initially contained 8 x underfeed stoker-fired Babcock and Wilcox boilers powering 2 x 75,000 kW manufactured between the B.T.H. Company and the Metropolitan-Vickers Electrical Company. The station reached its full capacity in 1939 at 303 MW with 4 × 75 MW B.T.H. turbo-generators plus a small house generator of 3.5 MW capacity. Steam conditions were 600 psig (41.4 bar) and 800 °F (427 °C). The B Station had 16 B&W chain grate boilers, each capable of producing 256,000 lbs steam per hour (32.3 kg/s). These were arranged in two boiler houses, with 8 boilers in each. The maximum total steam capacity of the B station boilers was 4,096,000 lb/hr (516 kg/s). The power station was transferred to the London Division of the British Electricity Authority upon nationalisation of the electricity industry in 1948. The B station closed on 15 March 1976, at which time its generating capacity was 144 megawatts.

=== Barking C power station ===
The British Electricity Authority built a third station at Creekmouth, which was completed in 1954. The C Station had three B.T.H. 75 MW turbo-generators operating with steam conditions of 900 psig (62 bar) and 900 °F (482 °C). There were 6 B&W boilers, 5 being pulverised fuel and the sixth a cyclone furnace. The maximum steam capacity of the station boilers was 2,565,000 lb/hr (323 kg/s). The pulverised fuel boilers were converted to oil firing around 1960. The station was closed on 26 October 1981, at which time its generating capacity was 220 MW. All three stations have since been demolished.

=== Electricity output ===
Electricity output from Barking A, B & C power stations over the period 1950–1981 was as follows.

Barking A annual electricity output GWh
Barking B annual electricity output GWh
Barking C annual electricity output GWh

== Barking Reach power station ==
The last station was at Chequers Lane at Dagenham Dock, to the west of Dagenham Breach (pond) and the Ford motor works. The station was constructed between 1992 and 1995 and was the first major generating station to be built in London for many years. It was one of the largest independently owned generating plants in the UK, being capable of generating 1000 MW of electricity, which is about 2% of the peak electricity demand in England and Wales.

The station used Combined Cycle Gas Turbine technology, with gas as its primary fuel. The station was owned by Barking Power Limited but was operated and managed by Thames Power Services.

In July 2014 the operators announced their intention to close the power station within two years. Decommissioning of the power station started in 2018, the chimneys being demolished using explosives.

In December 2018, the City of London acquired Barking Power Ltd along with the Barking Reach Power Station site. The 42-acre site was one of the potential options for the City Corporation's proposals to consolidate its three wholesale food markets of Billingsgate Fish Market (currently in Poplar), Smithfield Meat Market (central London) and New Spitalfields Market (Leyton). In March 2021, Barking and Dagenham Council gave planning permission for the City of London Corporation plans at the Dagenham Dock site.

Preceded by Carville B Power Station	Largest Power Station in the UK; 1925	Succeeded by Agecroft Power Station
Preceded by Fulham Power Station	Largest Power Station in the UK; 1954-1962	Succeeded by Drakelow Power Station
