= Ripple Lane TMD =

Former railway locomotive depot in East London, England

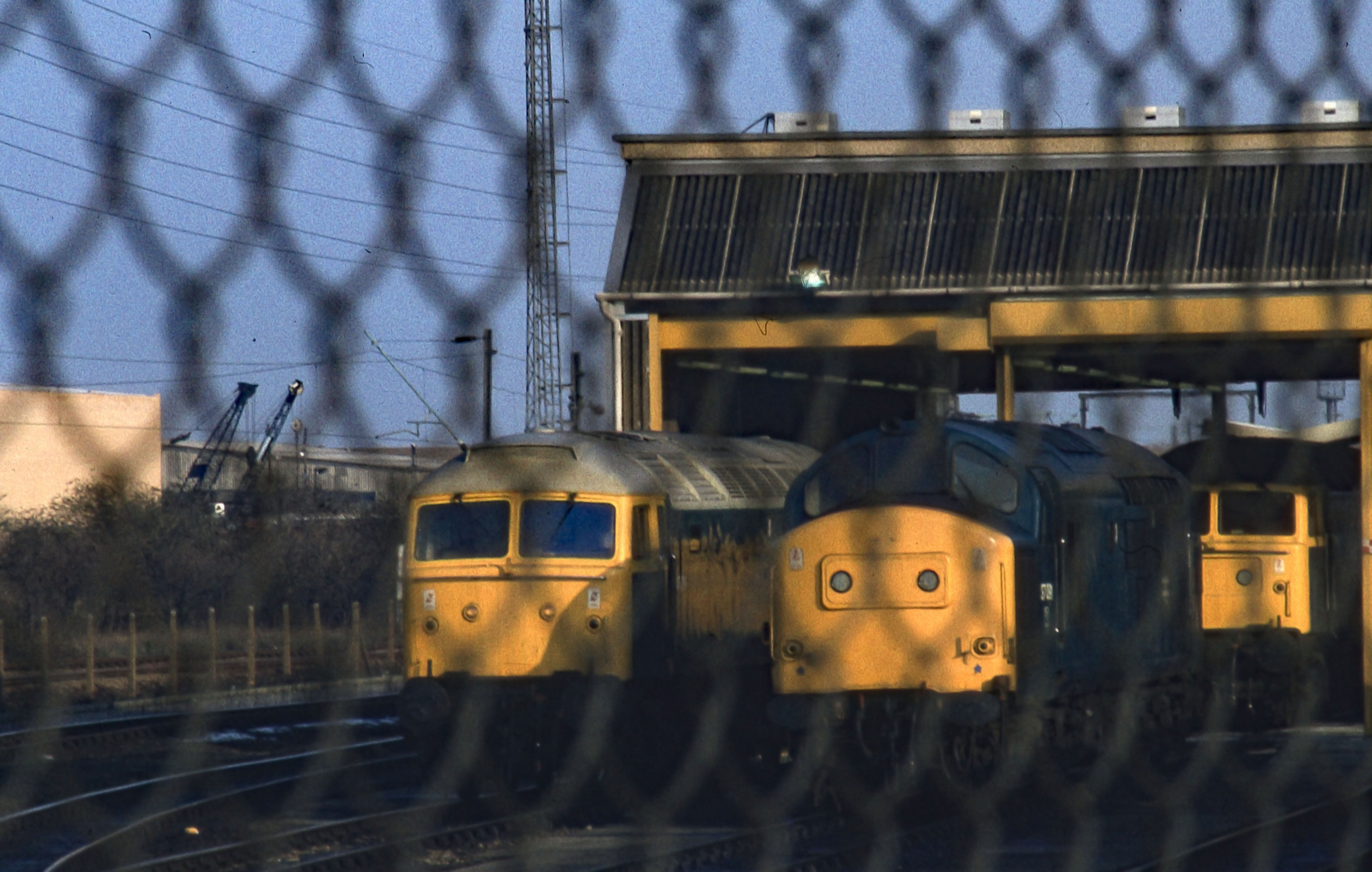
- Class 37 and 47 diesels at Ripple Lane TMD in the early 1980s
- Interactive map of Ripple Lane TMD

Location
- Location: Castle Green, London
- Coordinates: 51.5294°N 0.1251°E
- OS grid: TQ473833

Characteristics
- Owner: British Rail
- Depot code: RL (1973 - 1993)
- Type: Diesel

History
- Closed: 1993

Ripple Lane TMD, BR depot code RL, was a traction maintenance depot located to the south of Castle Green, London, England. It was located 9 miles 7 chains (14.6 km) east of Fenchurch Street station near the marshalling yard between Dagenham Dock and Barking stations. The actual depot was situated between the running lines with the up line to the south of the depot and the down line to the north.

== History ==
The facility opened in November 1959 as a fuelling and maintenance facility for diesel locomotives working on the London, Tilbury and Southend line which included Class 20s from Devons Road Depot, Class 31/0s from Stratford TMD and locally based shunting locomotives. From 1959 to 1960 the unreliable NBL Class 21 were allocated to Stratford and worked passenger and freight trains on the LT&S line.

In the 1970s and 1980s Ripple Lane was considered a sub-shed of Stratford (SF). At that time the depot had four roads each with an inspection pit. The building itself was of concrete and glass being long enough for a single Class 47 locomotive and without doors of any kind. In 1981 there were three Class 08 shunters outstationed at Ripple Lane shunting Ripple Lane yard and the nearby Ford factory. In addition to these shunters, in excess of 15 locomotives could be expected to stable overnight including shunters from Tilbury and Thameshaven.

Before its closure in 1993, British Rail Class 08 shunters, Class 47, Class 20, Class 37 and Class 31 could be seen at the depot.

The buildings were demolished in 2018.
