= Barking Creek =

River in the United Kingdom

Coordinates: 51.5163°N 0.0957°E

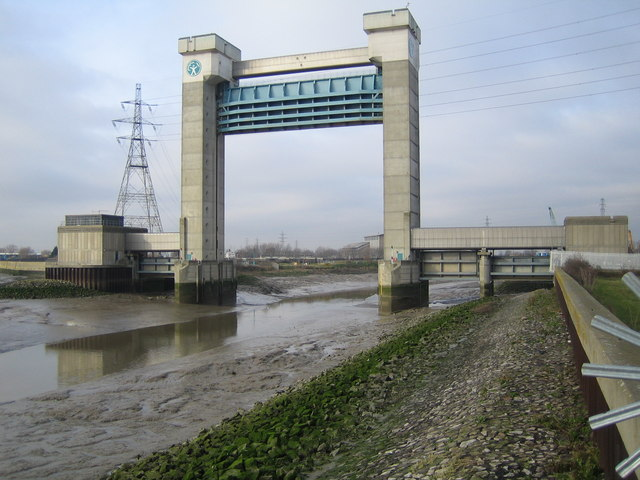
The downstream side of the Barking Creek tidal barrier, where Barking Creek joins the River Thames

Barking Creek joins the River Roding to the River Thames. It is fully tidal up to the Barking Barrage (a weir), which impounds a minimum water level through Barking.

In the 1850s, the creek was home to England's largest fishing fleet and a Victorian icehouse – where the fish were landed and stored prior to being transferred to London's fish markets. Barking Creek contains a small number of house boats, and the former village of Creekmouth is nearby.

The Barking Creek Barrier, a tidal flood barrier, was constructed in the 1980s as part of the Thames flood defence system, opening in 1983. Like all of the subsidiary gates, it is normally closed before, and opened after, the main Thames Barrier. The barrier is 38 metres wide, held aloft by two 40 metre towers to allow boats to pass at high tide.

== See also ==
- Battle of Barking Creek, a 'friendly fire' incident at the start of WW2
- RAF Hornchurch
