= London Borough of Barking and Dagenham =

Coordinates: 51°33′N 0°07′E

- London borough
- Coat of arms Council logo
- Motto(s): Dei gratia probemur rebus (By the grace of God let us be judged by our deeds)
- Barking and Dagenham shown within Greater London
- Sovereign state: United Kingdom
- Constituent country: England
- Region: London
- Ceremonial county: Greater London
- Created: 1 April 1965
- Admin HQ: 1 Town Hall Square, Barking

Government
  - Type: London borough council
  - Body: Barking and Dagenham London Borough Council
  - London Assembly: Unmesh Desai (Labour) AM for City and East
  - MPs: Nesil Caliskan (Labour); Margaret Mullane (Labour)

Area
  - Total: 13.93 sq mi (36.09 km^{2})
  - Rank: 269th (of 296)

Population (2025)
  - Total: 238,295
  - Rank: 81st (of 296)
  - Density: 17,100/sq mi (6,603/km^{2})
- Time zone: UTC (GMT)
  - Summer (DST): UTC+1 (BST)
- Postcodes: IG, RM
- Area code: 020
- ISO 3166 code: GB-BDG
- ONS code: 00AB
- GSS code: E09000002
- Police: Metropolitan Police
- Website: Council Website

The London Borough of Barking and Dagenham is a London borough in East London. The borough was created in 1965 as the London Borough of Barking; the name was changed in 1980. It is an Outer London borough and the south is within the London Riverside section of the Thames Gateway, an area designated as a national priority for urban regeneration. At the 2011 census it had a population of 187,000. The borough's three main towns are Barking, Chadwell Heath, and Dagenham. The local authority is the Barking and Dagenham London Borough Council. Barking and Dagenham was one of six London boroughs to host the 2012 Summer Olympics.

== History ==
The London Borough of Barking (as it was originally called) was created in 1965 under the London Government Act 1963, covering the combined area of the former Municipal Borough of Barking and the Municipal Borough of Dagenham, with the exceptions of a small area at Hog Hill from Dagenham which went to Redbridge, and the Gallions Reach area, being the part of Barking west of Barking Creek, which went to Newham. The area was transferred from Essex to Greater London to become one of the 32 London Boroughs. At the time of its creation the combined population of Barking and Dagenham was around 180,000.

The pre-1965 borough of Barking had evolved from the Barking Town local government district, which had been created in 1882 covering the central part of the parish of Barking. Such districts were reconstituted as urban districts under the Local Government Act 1894. The Barking Town Urban District was incorporated to become a municipal borough in 1931, at which point the name was changed from Barking Town to Barking.

Dagenham was a rural parish with a parish council from 1894, subordinate to the Romford Rural District Council. In 1926 the parish council was replaced when Dagenham was made an urban district; it was made a municipal borough in 1938.

The council changed the London borough's name from 'Barking' to 'Barking and Dagenham' with effect from 1 January 1980. In 1994, the borough was expanded to cover the part of the Becontree estate that until then had been within the Borough of Redbridge and other areas. The area covered by Mayesbrook Park in the Borough was once part of the historic Manor of Jenkins, seat of the Fanshawe family.

Until the mid-2000s, alongside neighbouring Havering due to its geographical location (being one of the most eastern boroughs of London) and regional postcodes, its predominant White British character as well as its working class cultural similarities to South Essex, Barking and Dagenham was widely perceived as being culturally part of neighbouring Essex as opposed to London. However, this sentiment faded out sometime after 2006 with the demographic changes as well as gentrification in the borough. In Dagenham in particular, the architecture is very similar to many other South Essex towns, etc. Basildon, Chelmsford, Brentwood.

Historic records of the London Borough of Barking and Dagenham and predecessor bodies, the Borough of Barking and the Borough of Dagenham, are held at the Barking and Dagenham Archive Service, Valence House Museum.

There are a total of 52 listed buildings located within the borough's boundaries. The Grade I and Grade II* listed buildings in the borough include Eastbury Manor House, the Church of Peter and Paul, Dagenham and Valence House.

== Boundaries ==
The borough borders the London Borough of Havering to the east with the River Rom forming part of the boundary. It borders the London Borough of Newham to the west with the River Roding forming much of the border. To the south is the River Thames which forms the borough's boundary with the London Borough of Bexley and the Royal Borough of Greenwich. To the north the borough forms a thin protrusion between Havering and the London Borough of Redbridge in order to encompass Chadwell Heath. 530 hectares within the borough are designated as part of the Metropolitan Green Belt.

== Geography ==
The borough's major districts include Barking, Becontree and Dagenham. It borders five other London boroughs: Newham, Redbridge, Havering, and Greenwich and Bexley to the south of the Thames.

Much of the housing of the borough was constructed by the London County Council during the interwar period of 1921–1939. Major settlement of the area, mostly escaping slum conditions in the East End of London, occurred during this period when the new motor and chemical industries such as the Ford Motor Company plant at Dagenham were set up. Since the decline of these industries in the 1980s, employment has shifted towards service sector jobs. There are large areas of logistics and warehouse development around the A13 road. Much of the borough is within the London Riverside area of the Thames Gateway zone and is the site of considerable house building and other development, such as Beam Park. A £500 million budget has been earmarked for redevelopment of the borough's principal district of Barking.

== Demographics ==
Population
Year	Pop.	±%
1801	1,937	—
1811	2,647	+36.7%
1821	3,110	+17.5%
1831	3,746	+20.5%
1841	4,151	+10.8%
1851	4,804	+15.7%
1861	5,983	+24.5%
1871	7,162	+19.7%
1881	8,341	+16.5%
1891	16,658	+99.7%
1901	25,080	+50.6%
1911	37,759	+50.6%
1921	67,708	+79.3%
1931	121,410	+79.3%
1941	143,122	+17.9%
1951	168,724	+17.9%
1961	164,639	−2.4%
1971	160,656	−2.4%
1981	148,973	−7.3%
1991	146,154	−1.9%
2001	163,944	+12.2%
2011	185,911	+13.4%
2021	218,871	+17.7%
2024 estimate	232,747	+6.3%
Source: A Vision of Britain through time 2024 estimate

Population pyramid of Barking and Dagenham in 2021

Religious makeup of Barking and Dagenham by single year age groups in 2021

Religion in London Borough of Barking and Dagenham (2021 census)
1. Christianity (45.4%)
2. Islam (24.4%)
3. Hinduism (3.00%)
4. Sikhism (2.00%)
5. Other (0.90%)
6. Non-religious (18.8%)
7. Not stated (5.50%)

In 1801, the civil parishes that form the modern borough had a total population of 1,937; and the area was characterised by farming, woodland and the fishing fleet at Barking. This last industry employed 1,370 men and boys by 1850, but by the end of the century had ceased to exist; replaced by train deliveries of fresh fish from the East Coast ports. The population rose slowly through the 19th century, as the district became built up; and new industries developed around Barking.

The population rose dramatically between 1921 and 1931, when the London County Council developed the Becontree Estate. This public housing development of 27,000 homes housed over 100,000 people, split between the then urban district councils of Ilford, Dagenham and Barking. People were rehoused from the slums of the East End. In 1931, the Ford Motor Company relocated to a 500 acres (2.0 km^{2}) site at Dagenham, and in 1932 the District line was extended to Upminster; bringing further development to the area.

After World War II, further public housing projects were built to rehouse the many Londoners, mainly from the East End, who were made homeless in the Blitz. As industry declined during the 1960s, the population entered a long decline, but has now begun to rise again with new housing developments on brownfield sites. In 2013 Barking and Dagenham has England's highest fertility rate: 2.58.

At the 2001 census, the White British and Irish ethnic group borough was recorded at 82, a modest decline from the 90% estimate recorded in the 1991 census.

However, by the time of the 2011 census the number of people identifying as White British sharply dropped to 49.5%. Barking and Dagenham has been strongly influenced by immigration, with the white British population having dropped 30.6% from 2001 to 2011 – the largest decrease in the country, and second largest proportional decrease, just behind neighbouring Newham. The population of non-UK born residents increasing by 205%. The largest decrease of White British occurred in the Longbridge ward (79.8% in 2001 to 35% in 2011), and the Abbey ward, which contains the main Barking area (from 46.2% to 15.8%). The smallest decrease was in the Eastbrook and Rush Green ward. The largest minority communities were of Black and Asian heritage.

Barking and Dagenham had by far the largest decrease of the 65+ population, having dropped almost 20% between 2001 and 2011. There were 69,700 households in the borough in 2011, up 3.6% from 2001. The borough also had the largest proportion of school-age (5–19) population of all the local authorities in England and Wales, 21.4%, at the 2011 census. The borough's pre-school (0–4) population rose by 49.1% from 2001 to 2011, by far the largest increase in London.

The following table shows the ethnic group of respondents in the 2001 and 2011 census in Barking and Dagenham.

=== Ethnicity ===
Ethnic makeup of Barking and Dagenham by single year ages in 2021

Ethnic demography of the London Borough of Barking and Dagenham over time

Ethnic group	Year											
Ethnic group	1971 estimations		1981 estimations		1991 census		2001 census		2011 census		2021 census	
Ethnic group	Number	%	Number	%	Number	%	Number	%	Number	%	Number	%
White: Total	–	98.2%	141,912	95.9%	133,903	93.19%	139,667	85.19%	108,386	58.30%	98,275	44.9%
White: British	—N/a	—N/a	—N/a	—N/a	—N/a	—N/a	132,566	80.86%	91,949	49.46%	67,550	30.9%
White: Irish	—N/a	—N/a	—N/a	—N/a	—N/a	—N/a	2,753	1.68%	1,730	0.93%	1,185	0.5%
White: Gypsy or Irish Traveller	—N/a	—N/a	—N/a	—N/a	—N/a	—N/a	—N/a	—N/a	182	0.10%	184	0.1%
White: Roma	—N/a	—N/a	—N/a	—N/a	—N/a	—N/a	—N/a	—N/a	—N/a	—N/a	858	0.4%
White: Other	—N/a	—N/a	—N/a	—N/a	—N/a	—N/a	4,348	2.65%	14,525	7.81%	28,498	13.0%
Asian or Asian British: Total	—N/a	—N/a	—N/a	—N/a	5,778	4%	9,061	5.53%	29,594	15.92%	56,583	25.8%
Asian or Asian British: Indian	—N/a	—N/a	—N/a	—N/a	2,807	1.95%	3,681	2.25%	7,436	4.00%	11,503	5.3%
Asian or Asian British: Pakistani	—N/a	—N/a	—N/a	—N/a	1,674	1.16%	3,055	1.86%	8,007	4.31%	15,799	7.2%
Asian or Asian British: Bangladeshi	—N/a	—N/a	—N/a	—N/a	200		673	0.41%	7,701	4.14%	22,393	10.2%
Asian or Asian British: Chinese	—N/a	—N/a	—N/a	—N/a	593		775	0.47%	1,315	0.71%	1,385	0.6%
Asian or Asian British: Other Asian	—N/a	—N/a	—N/a	—N/a	504		877	0.53%	5,135	2.76%	5,503	2.5%
Black or Black British: Total	—N/a	—N/a	—N/a	—N/a	3,347	2.32%	11,440	6.98%	37,140	19.98%	46,807	21.4%
Black or Black British: African	—N/a	—N/a	—N/a	—N/a	919	0.6%	7,284	4.44%	28,685	15.43%	35,101	16.0%
Black or Black British: Caribbean	—N/a	—N/a	—N/a	—N/a	1,790	1.24%	3,434	2.09%	5,227	2.81%	5824	2.7%
Black or Black British: Other Black	—N/a	—N/a	—N/a	—N/a	638	0.4%	722	0.44%	3,228	1.74%	5882	2.7%
Mixed or British Mixed: Total	—N/a	—N/a	—N/a	—N/a	—N/a	—N/a	3,076	1.88%	7,878	4.24%	9,320	4.3%
Mixed: White and Black Caribbean	—N/a	—N/a	—N/a	—N/a	—N/a	—N/a	1,420	0.87%	2,669	1.44%	2,974	1.4%
Mixed: White and Black African	—N/a	—N/a	—N/a	—N/a	—N/a	—N/a	572	0.35%	2,128	1.14%	2,376	1.1%
Mixed: White and Asian	—N/a	—N/a	—N/a	—N/a	—N/a	—N/a	534	0.33%	1,246	0.67%	1,550	0.7%
Mixed: Other Mixed	—N/a	—N/a	—N/a	—N/a	—N/a	—N/a	550	0.34%	1,835	0.99%	2,420	1.1%
Other: Total	—N/a	—N/a	—N/a	—N/a	653	0.45%	700	0.43%	2,913	1.57%	7,886	3.6%
Other: Arab	—N/a	—N/a	—N/a	—N/a	—N/a	—N/a	—N/a	—N/a	973	0.52%	1,489	0.7%
Other: Any other ethnic group	—N/a	—N/a	—N/a	—N/a	653	0.45%	700	0.43%	1,940	1.04%	6,397	2.9%
Ethnic minority: Total	–	1.8%	6,063	4.1%	9,778	6.8%	24,277	14.81%	77,525	41.70%	120,596	55.1%
Total	–	100%	147,975	100%	143,681	100%	163,944	100.00%	185,911	100.00%	218,871	100%

==== Religion ====
Religion	2021	
Religion	Number	%
Christian	99,342	45,4%
Muslim	53,389	24,4%
Hindu	6,596	3,0%
Buddhist	821	0,4%
Sikh	4,284	1,96%
Jewish	272	0,12%
Other religion	981	0,45%
No religion	41,191	18,8%
Religion not stated	11,991	5,48%
Total	218,867	100%

=== Immigration ===
This list includes top-15 sources of immigration to Borough of Barking and Dagenham for 2021 census:

#	Country	Number
1	Nigeria	9,434
2	Romania	9,416
3	Bangladesh	9,290
4	Pakistan	7,275
5	India	6,677
6	Lithuania	5,494
7	Ghana	3,320
8	Bulgaria	2,749
9	Poland	2,321
10	Moldova	2,222
11	Italy	2,073
12	Albania	1,394
13	Somalia	1,311
14	Kosovo	1,261
15	Portugal	1,253

== Governance ==
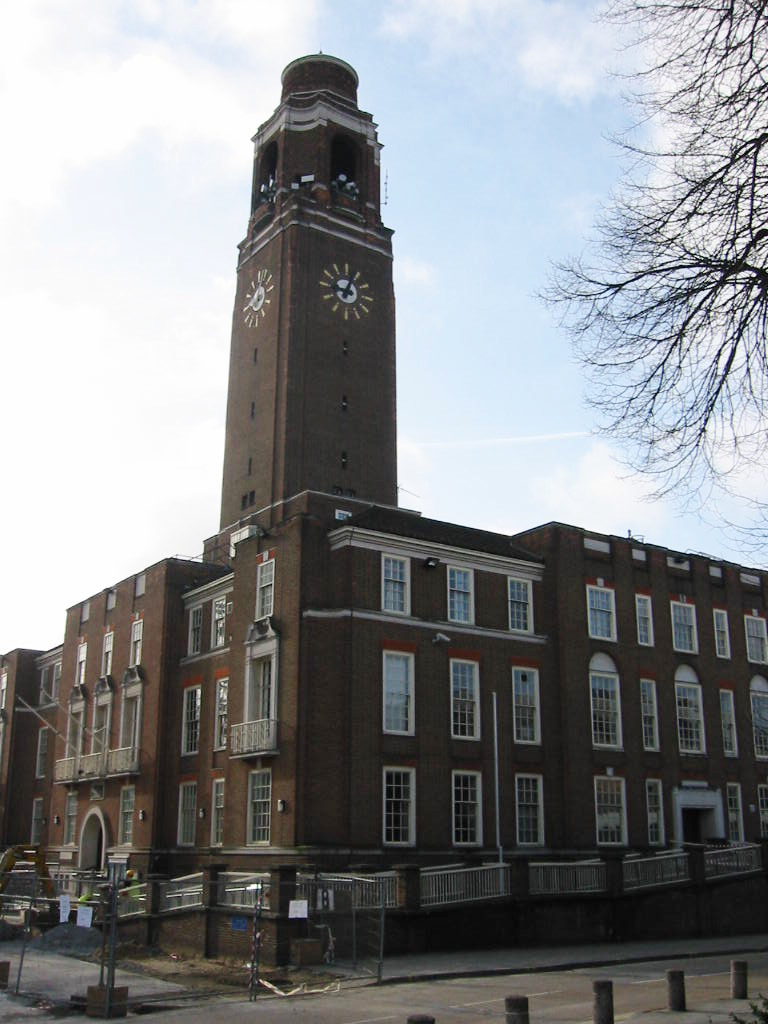
Barking Town Hall, headquarters of Barking and Dagenham Council

The local authority is Barking and Dagenham Council, which meets at Barking Town Hall.

=== Greater London representation ===
For elections to the Greater London Council, the borough formed the Barking electoral division, electing two members. In 1973 it was divided into the single-member Barking and Dagenham electoral divisions. The Greater London Council was abolished in 1986.

Since 2000, the borough is within the City and East London Assembly constituency, returning Unmesh Desai as the directly elected Assembly Member.

=== UK Parliament ===
The borough is covered by two parliamentary constituencies: Barking and Dagenham and Rainham. The latter was first contested in 2010.

=== Twin cities ===
London Borough of Barking and Dagenham is twinned with:

- Witten, North Rhine-Westphalia, Germany
- Tczew, Pomeranian Voivodeship, Poland

== Education ==
There are many schools and further education facilities in the borough. Situated near the Town Hall, the Barking Learning Centre is a learning facility providing a range of courses leading to recognised qualifications. It also includes a library with free public internet access, the council's first One Stop Shop, conference and meeting space, a gallery and a café. A study in 2017 found that nearly half of Barking & Dagenham's 19 year olds lack Level 3 qualifications (A Level equivalent) which was the highest figure in London.

Barking & Dagenham College is a general further education college offering courses for leaners 16+. It has four campuses across the borough with their main campus being located in Rush Green less than a mile from the Romford town centre. Their other campus is located in Barking town center at the Technical Skills Academy, The Broadway Theatre and Barking Learning Centre.

CU London, a Higher Education institute owned and governed by Coventry University, started offering courses to students in September 2017. Situated in the former Dagenham Civic Centre, they offer a range of subjects across Foundation, HNC, HND and degree level.

The University of East London formerly had a campus in the borough, however this has now closed with all campuses now being located in the neighbouring borough of Newham.

== Transport ==
In March 2011, the main forms of transport that residents used to travel to work were: driving a car or van, 22.5% of all residents aged 16–74; underground, metro, light rail, tram, 7.5%; bus, minibus or coach, 7.5%; train, 7.3%; on foot, 3.7%; passenger in a car or van, 1.7%; work mainly at or from home, 1.3%.

=== Rail ===
Barking and Dagenham is served by both the London Underground and National Rail networks. On the London Underground, the Borough is served by both Hammersmith & City Line, and District Line trains.

National Rail c2c trains call at Dagenham Dock and Barking railway stations. Most c2c trains terminate at London Fenchurch Street, whilst to the east, trains serve Grays, Southend and Shoeburyness in Essex.

Barking and, from summer 2022, Barking Riverside railway stations are served by the London Overground's Suffragette line with frequent services to Gospel Oak in the London Borough of Camden.

The Elizabeth Line serves Chadwell Heath railway station, which straddles the border between the London Borough of Redbridge and the borough.

Hammersmith & City Line services terminate at Barking. Some District Line services terminate at Barking, but many also call at Upney, Becontree, Dagenham Heathway and Dagenham East in the Borough. Some services terminate at Dagenham East.

=== Bus ===
Several London Buses serve the Borough. Night buses 128, EL1, N15 and N86 travel into Central London, Stratford, Romford and Harold Hill every night.

=== Cycling ===
Cycle Superhighway 3 begins in Barking, to the south of Greatfields Park, linking the Borough to Canary Wharf, the City of London and the City of Westminster via a bike freeway, most of which is segregated from other road traffic. TfL plans to extend the cycle network to Barking Riverside; the first consultations about this closed in winter 2019.

=== Roads ===
Two major A-roads cross the Borough: the A12 and A13.

The A12 has one junction in the Borough, to the north of Chadwell Heath. To the west, the A12 carries traffic through Newbury Park towards the North Circular, Stratford and Central London. To the east, the A12 heads through Romford towards the M25 and south and east Essex.

The A13 is named Alfred's Way as it enters the Borough to the west. Crossing Barking and Dagenham, the dual carriageway can be accessed via several grade-separated junctions. Leaving the Borough to the west via the A13 will lead to the Docklands and the City of London. To the east, the A13 passes Rainham and the M25 before traffic heads into south Essex.

Other A-roads cross the Borough, including the A118, A123, A124, A1083, A1112, and A1306, although these roads are smaller and generally carry less traffic.

== Local media ==
Time 107.5 FM was the commercial radio station broadcasting from Romford, and served East London and West Essex. On 1 August 2025 the station closed, with the 107.5 frequency transferring to Nation Radio London.

Bedrock Radio is a local community radio service based in the nearby Queen's Hospital in Romford.

The first Hospital Radio Service In Dagenham was founded in 1969 as Radio Rush Green with studios located in the porters’ lodge on the grounds of the former Rush Green Hospital on Dagenham Road. In 1985 Radio Rush Green began serving nearby Oldchurch Hospital, Romford, where the station rebranded to Hospital Radio 174 named after the bus route 174, which connected the two hospital sites. When Rush Green Hospital closed, the studios where moved into Oldchurch Hospital, the service renamed to Oldchurch Radio. The station became Bedrock Radio in 2002, after a merger with Harold Wood Hospital Radio, ahead of the opening of Queen's Hospital in 2006.

Today, Bedrock Radio serves the local community by broadcasting online and served local hospitals of Queen's, King George & Goodmayes Hospitals. The station features information about the Hospitals, NHS services, promotes charitable and community organisations and has an extensive local events guide featuring community & non-profit events. Bedrock Radio also provides local news on-air covering East London and South Essex, the station has announced it will launch on a local DAB+ later in 2025.

Barking & Dagenham News, a hyperlocal news service distributes news, weather, travel, sport and entertainment updates on Facebook Watch.

== London Fire Brigade ==
The London Borough of Barking and Dagenham has two fire stations within its boundary: Barking and Dagenham. Barking fire station operates two pumping appliances, a bulk foam unit and a command unit. The support units that are operated here will cover a large selection of station grounds and areas. Dagenham fire station operates two pumping appliances and a 64m turn-table ladder. The turntable ladder is one of three that are in use in London and are the tallest aerial appliances in Europe.

Of the two stations; Dagenham is the busier, attending over 2,000 incidents in 2006/2007.

== Coat of arms ==
The coat of arms of the borough displays the Curfew tower of Barking Abbey in its crest.

== Freedom of the Borough ==
The following people and military units have received the Freedom of the Borough of Barking and Dagenham.

=== Individuals ===
- George Shaw: 1992.
- Charles J. Fairbrass: 1992.
- Stephen R Thompson: 2008
- Sandie Shaw: 28 April 2021.
- Claire Symonds: 28 April 2021.
- Paul Ince: 23 September 2021.
- Trevor Lock: 23 September 2021.
- Dora Challingsworth: 23 September 2021.

=== Military units ===
- The Royal Anglian Regiment: February 2010.

== See also ==
- List of people from Barking and Dagenham
