= List of schools in the London Borough of Barking and Dagenham =

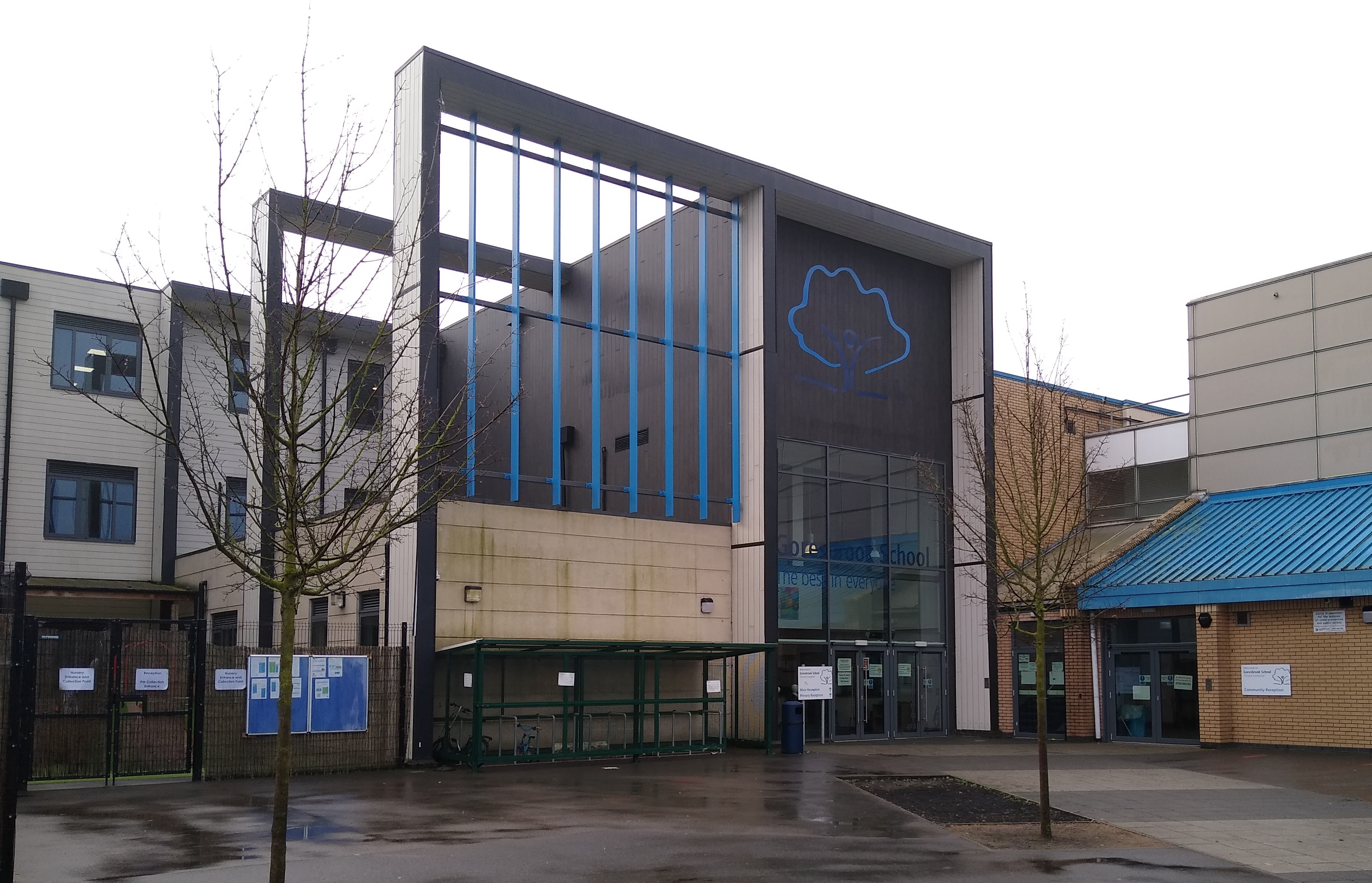
Goresbrook School

This is a list of schools in the London Borough of Barking and Dagenham, England.

== State-funded schools ==
=== Primary schools ===
- Beam Primary School
- Becontree Primary School
- Dorothy Barley Infants' School
- Dorothy Barley Junior Academy
- Eastbrook School
- Eastbury Community School
- Eastbury Primary School
- Five Elms Primary School
- Furze Infants' School
- Gascoigne Primary School
- George Carey CE Primary School
- Godwin School
- Goresbrook School
- Grafton Primary School
- Henry Green Primary School
- Hunters Hall Primary School
- The James Cambell Primary School
- John Perry Primary School
- The Leys Primary School
- Manor Infants' School
- Manor Junior School
- Marsh Green Primary School
- Monteagle Primary School
- Northbury Primary School
- Parsloes Primary School
- Richard Alibon Primary School
- Ripple Primary School
- Riverside Primary School
- Robert Clack School
- Roding Primary School
- Rose Lane Primary School
- Rush Green Primary School
- St Joseph's RC Primary School, Barking
- St Joseph's RC Primary School, Dagenham
- St Margaret's CE Primary School
- St Peter's RC Primary School
- The St Teresa RC Primary School
- St Vincent's RC Primary School
- Southwood Primary School
- Thames View Infant School
- Thames View Junior School
- Thomas Arnold Primary School
- Valence Primary School
- Village Infants' School
- Warren Junior School
- William Bellamy Primary School
- William Ford CE Junior School

=== Secondary schools ===
- All Saints Catholic School
- Barking Abbey School
- Dagenham Park Church of England School
- Eastbrook School
- Eastbury Community School
- Elutec
- Greatfields School
- Goresbrook School
- Jo Richardson Community School
- Riverside School
- Robert Clack School
- The Sydney Russell School
- The Warren School

=== Special and alternative schools ===
- Mayesbrook Park School
- Pathways School
- Riverside Bridge School
- Trinity School

=== Further education ===
- Barking and Dagenham College
- Adult College of Barking and Dagenham
- Barking Learning Centre

== Independent schools ==
=== Primary and preparatory schools ===
- Alamiyah School

=== Senior and all-through schools ===
- Frobel Independent School
- Lady Aisha Academy

=== Special and alternative schools ===
- Hopewell School
- Northstar New School
