= Grade I and II* listed buildings in the London Borough of Barking and Dagenham =

There are over 9,000 Grade I listed buildings and 20,000 Grade II* listed buildings in England. This page is a list of these buildings in the London Borough of Barking and Dagenham.

== Grade I ==
Name	Location	Type	Completed (Note: The date given is the date used by Historic England as significant for the initial building or that of an important part in the structure's description.)	Date designated	Grid ref. (Note: The grid reference is based on the British national grid reference system, sometimes known as OSGB36, used by the Ordnance Survey.) Geo-coordinates	Entry number (Note: The "List Entry Number" is a unique number assigned to each listed building and scheduled monument by Historic England.)	Image
Eastbury Manor House	Barking	Manor house	16th century	28 May 1954	TQ4570983804; 51°32′04″N 0°05′58″E	1359303	Eastbury Manor House More images
Garden walls of Eastbury Manor House	Barking	Garden wall	16th century	28 May 1954	TQ4573983813; 51°32′04″N 0°05′59″E	1064414	Garden walls of Eastbury Manor House More images
Church of St Margaret	Barking	Parish church	13th century	28 May 1954	TQ4406583891; 51°32′08″N 0°04′33″E	1064408	Church of St Margaret More images

== Grade II* ==
Name	Location	Type	Completed	Date designated	Grid ref. Geo-coordinates	Entry number	Image
Church of St Peter and St Paul	Dagenham	Church	1688	28 June 1954	TQ5004384530; 51°32′21″N 0°09′50″E	1359302	Church of St Peter and St Paul More images
Eastbrook public house	Dagenham	Public house	Built 1937–38	11 December 2009	TQ4996585842; 51°33′04″N 0°09′48″E	1393600	Eastbrook public house More images
Fire Bell Gate (also known as the Curfew Tower), Barking Abbey	Barking	Gate	Early 19th century	28 May 1954	TQ4409683947; 51°32′08″N 0°04′40″E	1064407	Fire Bell Gate (also known as the Curfew Tower), Barking Abbey More images
Valence House	Becontree	House	13th century	28 June 1954	TQ4804486539; 51°33′28″N 0°08′09″E	1064404	Valence House More images

== Grade II ==
Name	Location	Type	Completed	Date designated	Grid ref. Geo-coordinates	Entry number	Image
Barking station	Barking	station	13 April 1854	24 November 1995	TQ4435184373; 51°32′21″N 0°04′54″E	1242678	Barking station More images
Civic Centre	Dagenham	Building	October 1937	24 August 1981	TQ4951986869; 51°33′37″N 0°09′22″E	1064422	Civic Centre More images
St Patrick's Church	Barking	Church	July 1940	10 September 2009	TQ4542283725; 51°32′01″N 0°05′43″E	1393196	St Patrick's Church More images
