= Manor of Jenkins =

Former English manor

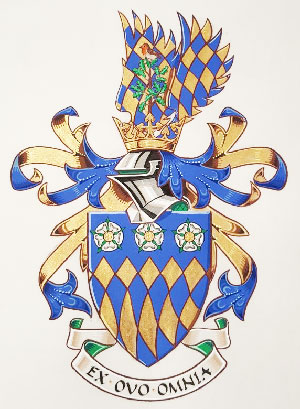

Jenkins was a manor under the overlordship of Barking manor. It was also known as 'Dagenham' manor, 'Dagenhams' and 'Dagenham Place' throughout the centuries. Today, the once open area has been consumed by suburbia.

== The Manor of Jenkins in Essex, England ==
It was originally property of the Abbey of Barking, and was granted status of a freehold. This meant throughout time it was put for lease and indeed some manorial Lords did also lease nearby tenements. As such the estate at its largest spread as far as Dagenham village and it was found in some historical records to have stretched as far as East Hall. The original estate was located in present-day Mayesbrook Park in the London Borough of Barking & Dagenham, north of where Eastbury manor house stands today. Eastbury is a popular tourist attraction.

Records from 1540 suggest that, at an ancient and unknown time, Barking Abbey had allowed the holding of Jenkins to a family recorded as Fitz-stephen, at a rent of 4 shillings and 4 pence. In 1273 the manor of Jenkins was recorded as being held by Emery de Bezill, for a rent of 8 shillings 8 pence and a suit-court.

The Bishop of Winchester was leased Jenkins by Robert Osborne in 1448 for a rent of £13 6 shillings 8 pence. Osborne was purported to have assaulted the Abbess in 1450 over a disagreement regarding his access rights to a tenement he held in the Abbey grounds. Records show that in 1456 the manor was owned by the Abbey and was leased to a T. Plomer for a rent of 31 shillings 2 pence.

Records show that in 1479-80 Jenkins was purchased by a H. Brown and H. Wodecock. They sold Jenkins to a H. Brice, who held the neighbouring manor of Mal-maynes, further down the Mayes Brook towards the marshes. His son received the manor, but he was a child and died without heirs of his own. It then passed to his sister who married the Master of the Mint to Henry VIII, Robert Amadas. In 1555, the Jenkins estate belonged to Frances and Martin Bowes.

In 1567-68 the manor was conveyed to Henry Fanshawe who died later that year. His nephew then received the manor dying in 1601. The manor passed to his wife, but reverted to the Crown in 1628 and it was conveyed to Sir Thomas Fanshawe, their son. Documents describe the house of the time as a large gabled building which included a chapel with a window of stained glass containing an image of a woman suspected to be a depiction of the Abbess. A farmhouse stood on the original manor house site until 1937 when what was then called Jenkins farm was torn down for development of the expanding suburbs of London.

By tradition, a court baron and a court leet were held annually at Barking in April and a manorial court at Ilford in October. The Lord of the manor is no longer duty bound to hold these events as technically there are no people working the land for the manor; the manorial lands have now been consumed by the London Borough of Barking & Dagenham. However the title holder, Benjamin Harvey, Esq. retains the right to hold manorial courts at will.
