= Parsloes Park =

Park in Becontree, East London, England

Coordinates: 51.544°N 0.134°E

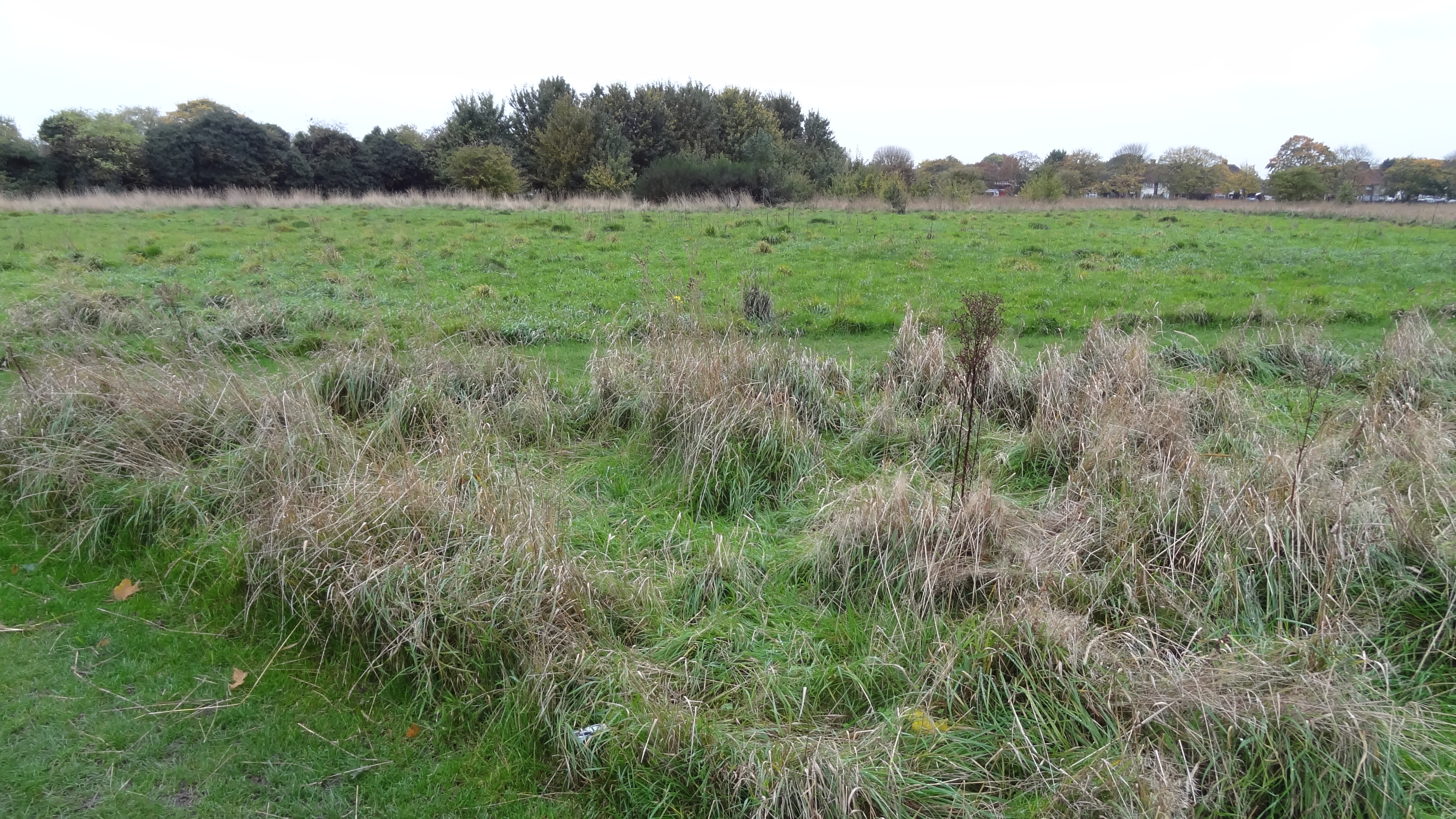
Parsloes Park Squatts

Parsloes Park is a 58 hectare public park in Becontree in the London Borough of Barking and Dagenham. It is owned and managed by the borough council. It is designated as metropolitan open land, which provides a high level of protection from development. A small area opposite the Wren Road entrance is managed for wildlife and designated as a Local Nature Reserve called Parsloes Park Squatts.

The park derives its name from the Passelewe family, who owned the land in the thirteenth century. It formed part of the grounds of the demolished Parsloes Manor House. Paintings of the old manor house are held in the Valence House Museum.

The land was acquired by the London County Council in 1923. The park was opened by MP Christopher Addison on 13 July 1935, marking the official completion of the LCC Becontree estate. It has a children's play area, football pitches, tennis courts, a basketball court, a bowling green (now defunct) and a lake, formed from a former gravel pit.

In 2024, The Bobby Moore Sports Hub, named after the footballer, was opened. The facility features 16 grass sports pitches and three 3G pitches, one of which is used by May & Baker FC and Athletic Newham FC. Other pitches are used by Essex Alliance Football League sides Bakers693, CSM London, Waltham Forest Borough and Philip United. It also includes a new pavilion building housing amenities such as a gym and a café. Parsloes Park Squatts is an area of rough acid grassland with a historic hedge. A number of tree planting programmes have taken place, including using the Miyawaki Method. In 2022, 8,000 saplings were planted in the park, next to this area, as part of a Forest of Thanks initiative following the Covid-19 Pandemic.

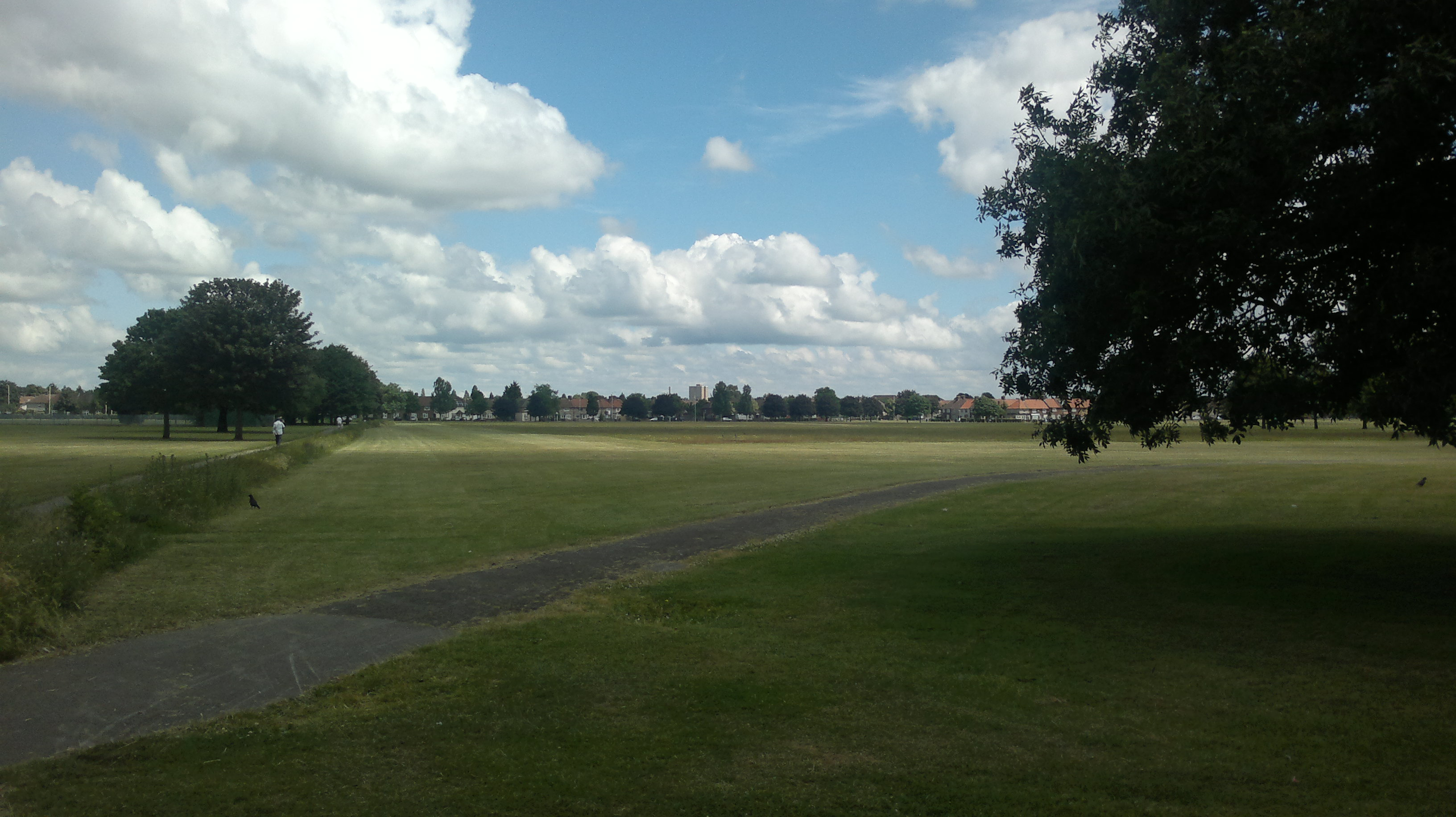
View of Parsloes Park

In the 1930s, the stretch of the Gores Brook which flowed through Parsloes Park was channelled through a pipe and buried. The brook now runs in culvert for approximately 430 metres under the eastern section of the Park. In 2022, Thames21 supported by the Mayor of London's Green and Resilient Spaces fund, announced plans to deculvert the stretch of Gores Brook running through the park.

In summer 2022, two new playgrounds were installed designed by artists Yinka Ilori and Eva Rothschild in collaboration between Create London and the London Borough of Barking and Dagenham. The latter consists of metal climbing frames inspired by a stone pyramid in Killiney Hill in Ireland, the former of a varied play area inspired by the former presence of flamingos in the park.

There are entrances in Parsloes Avenue, Gale Street and Wren Road.

Parsloes is also a ward of the London Borough of Barking and Dagenham. The population of the ward at the 2011 Census was 9,839.
