= List of public art in the London Borough of Barking and Dagenham =

This is a list of public art in the London Borough of Barking and Dagenham.

== Barking ==
Image	Title / subject	Location and coordinates	Date	Artist / designer	Architect / other	Type	Designation	Notes
	Barking War Memorial	Barking Park 51.5445°N 0.0836°E	1922	—	Charles James Dawson	War memorial	Grade II	
More images	The Catch	Fanshawe Avenue Roundabout 51.5409°N 0.0829°E	2002	Loraine Leeson	Anne Thorne Architects	Sculpture	—	
More images	Folly Wall	Town Square	2007	?	muf	Folly	—	
More images	The Lighted Lady of Barking	Roundabout at junction of Abbey Road and London Road 51.53775°N 0.07232°E	2007	Joost van Santen	—	Sculpture	—	
More images	Statue of Job Henry Charles Drain	Outside the Broadway, facing Barking Abbey Park 51.5353°N 0.0776°E	2009	Steven Hunter (Sculpt-It Limited); Mark Barnett (relief plaque)	—	Statue	—	
	Barking Berg	Abbey Road, Roding Riverside	2014	The Klassnik Corporation (Tomas Klassnik and Chloe Spiby Loh)	—	Sculpture	—	A timber clinker boat appearing to emerge from a "melting" faceted plinth, alluding to the area's maritime history and the discovery of historic ice houses nearby.
	Globe and Anchor	London Road		?	—	Sculpture	—	
	Inscribed benches	Town Quay		?	—	Stone benches	—	

London Bridge Stones

In 2007, two small stones from remains of the medieval London Bridge were joined together in a sculpture in front of St Margaret's Church, facing the ruins of Barking Abbey, as part of several public artworks placed in Barking town centre by the artist Joost van Santen.

== Dagenham ==
Image	Title / subject	Location and coordinates	Date	Artist / designer	Architect / other	Type	Designation	Notes
	Dagenham War Memorial	Heathway	After 1918	?	?	War memorial	—	
More images	Dagenham Village War Memorial	Junction of Church Lane and Crown Street 51.5399°N 0.1614°E	2000	?	?	War memorial cross	—	
	Sporting Heroes of Barking and Dagenham Bobby Moore Alf Ramsey Jason Leonard Beverley Gull	Gale Street	2008	The Sculpture Factory	—	Sculptures	—	
	Dagenham Idol	Valence Park	c. 2009	?	—	Sculpture	—	An iron maquette for an unrealised large sculpture, based on the prehistoric artefact of the same name.
	Capri MkI	Valence Park	2010–2011	A. J. Baldwin	—	Sculpture	—	An iron sculpture commissioned as part of the redevelopment of Valence House, the borough's local history museum; it alludes to the Ford Dagenham factory.
	Sustrans Portrait Bench	Beam Valley Country Park	2015	?	—	Sculptures	—	The three figures represent a machinist in the 1968 strike at Ford Dagenham; Ian Fisher, a soldier in the War in Afghanistan; and the singer Billy Bragg.

== Bibliography ==
- Matthews, Peter (2018). London's Statues and Monuments. Oxford: Shire Publications.
