= May & Baker F.C. =

Association football club in England

Coordinates: 51°32′36.4″N 0°8′4.8″E

May & Baker EC
- Full name: May & Baker Eastbrook Community Football Club
- Nickname: Bakers
- Founded: 1923
- Ground: Bobby Moore Sports Hub, Dagenham
- Chairman: Ray Wright
- Manager: Petrit Elbi
- League: Eastern Counties League Division One South
- 2025–26: Eastern Counties League Division One South, 18th of 21
Home colours

May & Baker Eastbrook Community Football Club is a football club based in Eastbrook, Dagenham, England. They are currently members of the Eastern Counties League Division One South and play at Bobby Moore Sports Hub in Parsloes, Dagenham.

== History ==
The club was established in 1923 as a works team of the May & Baker company. The club became members of the Essex Business Houses League and went on to win the League Cup in 2005–06. The club subsequently joined Division Three of the Essex Olympian League the following season. The club were Division Three runners-up in their first season in the league, and were promoted to Division Two, which was renamed Division One prior to the next season. The 2007–08 season saw them finish second in Division One, earning promotion to the Premier Division. Despite finishing fifth in the Premier Division the following season, they were demoted back to Division One. However, the club went on to win the Division One title in 2009–10 and were promoted back to the Premier Division. They won the Denny King Memorial Cup in 2011–12.

In 2014 the club were renamed May and Baker Eastbrook Community, reflecting the area of Dagenham in which the club is based. They won the Essex Junior Cup in 2016–17, and moved up to the newly created Division One South of the Eastern Counties League at the end of the following season.

== Ground ==
The club originally played on a pitch behind the May & Baker factory, with spectator facilities consisting of seats in a covered veranda built into the clubhouse. The pitch was requisitioned for use by the factory in the 1970s. The club moved to the M&B Sports and Social Club, a large sports ground site including a railed-off pitch and pavilion. In order to move up to the Eastern Counties League, the club relocated to Barking RFC's Gale Street ground. Prior to the 2019–20 season, May & Baker entered a groundsharing agreement at Aveley’s Parkside ground.

Ahead of the 2024–25 season, the club moved to Parsloes Park in Dagenham.

== Honours ==
- Essex Olympian League
  - Division One champions 2009–10
  - Denny King Memorial Cup winners 2011–12
- Essex Business Houses League
  - League Cup winners 2005–06
- Essex Junior Cup
  - Winners 2016–17

== Records ==
- Best FA Vase performance: Second round, 2018–19, 2023–24
