= Henry Fanshawe (1506–1568) =

British Member of Parliament and Remembrancer of the Exchequer

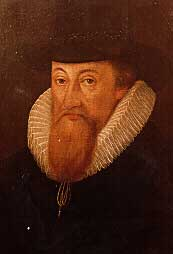
Henry Fanshawe

Henry Fanshawe (1506–1568) was a Member of the English Parliament during the reign of Elizabeth I. He also served as Queen's Remembrancer from 1565 to his death in 1568. Valence House Museum has a portrait of him (c. 1560) that was donated by Aubrey Fanshawe.

== Background ==
A member of the minor gentry of Derbyshire, Henry was born around 1506 at Fanshawe Gate Hall. After completing his education at Beauchief Abbey, Henry moved to London in the 1520s and obtained a clerkship within the Exchequer through the influence of his kinsman, Sir Christopher More.

== Public life ==
Little is known about Henry's career between his move to London and his elevation to the position of the Queen's Remembrancer in 1565. He was the first of nine members of the Fanshawe family to hold this position between 1565 and 1716, when the eldest branch of the Fanshawe family died out. In the 1561 patent for the reversion of the office of Remembrancer to Henry, his "good, true, and faithful service" is mentioned during every reign from Henry VIII to Elizabeth I. In 1566, Henry is first mentioned as Member of Parliament for Kingston upon Hull, although it is thought that he had entered Parliament at an earlier date. It was also around this time that Henry became Lord of the Manor of several estates, including Jenkins, which would remain in the Fanshawe family for over a century.

Shortly before his death, Henry secured reversion of the office of Remembrancer for his nephew, Thomas Fanshawe. In his will, Henry left a sum of money for the founding of a school in the parish in which he was born, which would come to be known as Dronfield Henry Fanshawe School. The profits of several of the estates he had accumulated over the years was dedicated to this end. Upon his death, Henry was buried at St Margaret's Church, Barking on 8 November 1568.

== Family ==
Henry was married twice. His first wife was Thomasine Hopkins, daughter of William Hopkins. After his first wife's death circa 1561/1562, Henry remarried to Dorothy Stonard, daughter of George Stonard. They had three daughters: Dorothy "Darraty" (bap. 16 March 1565 Christ Church Greyfriars Newgate, City of London, England) who died as an infant, Anne (who married William Fuller Esq.) and Susanna.
