= Christ Church, Barking =

Anglican church in London, England

Coordinates: 51.52845°N 0.09970°E

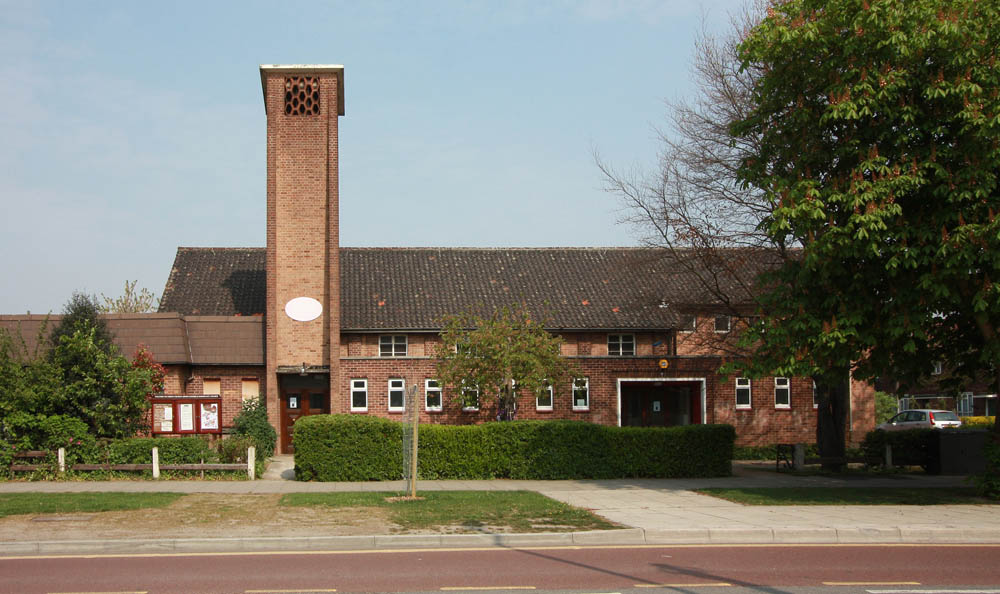
Christ Church

Christ Church, Barking or Christ Church, Thames View is a Church of England church on the Thames View estate in Barking, Greater London. It was built between 1958 and 1959 as a chapel of ease to St Patrick's. From the late 1970s until 1 January 2017 it formed a team parish with St Patrick's and St Margaret's.
