= Barking, London =

Town in Greater London, England

Coordinates: 51.54°N 0.08°E

Barking
- Riverside Town
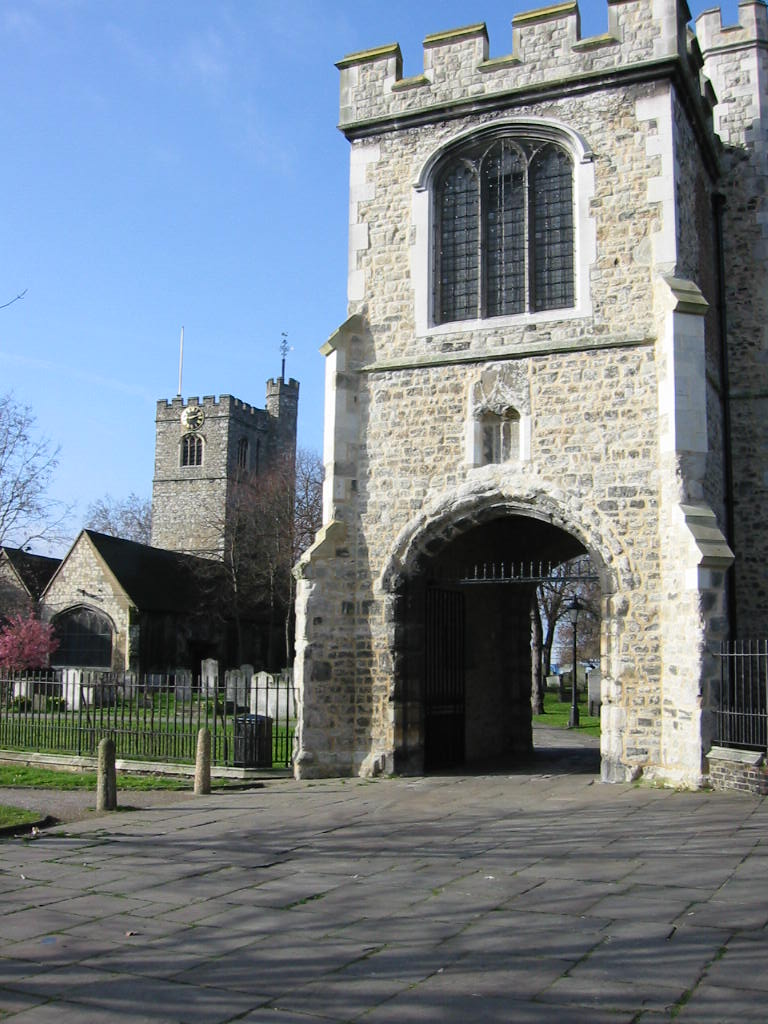
- Barking Abbey curfew tower with St Margaret's Church in background

- Location within Greater London
- Population: 218,534 (Office for National Statistics)
- OS grid reference: TQ440840
  - Charing Cross: 10 mi (16 km) W
- London borough: Barking & Dagenham
- Ceremonial county: Greater London
- Region: London
- Country: England
- Sovereign state: United Kingdom
- Post town: BARKING
- Postcode district: IG11
- Dialling code: 020
- Police: Metropolitan
- Fire: London
- Ambulance: London
- UK Parliament: Barking
- London Assembly: City and East

Barking is a riverside town in East London, England, within the London Borough of Barking and Dagenham. It is 9.3 miles (15 km) east of Charing Cross. The total population of Barking was 218,534 in 2021. (Note: If defined as the Abbey, Eastbury, Gascoigne, Longbridge, and Thames electoral wards of Barking & Dagenham Council) In addition to an extensive and fairly low-density residential area, the town centre forms a large retail and commercial district, currently a focus for regeneration. The former industrial lands to the south are being redeveloped as Barking Riverside.

Historically, Barking was an ancient parish that straddled the River Roding in the Becontree Hundred and historic county of Essex. It underwent a shift from fishing and farming to market gardening and industrial development on the River Thames. Barking railway station opened in 1854 and has been served by the London Underground since 1908. As part of the suburban growth of London in the 20th century, The Urban District of Barking significantly expanded and increased in population, primarily due to the development of the London County Council estate at Becontree in the 1920s, and became a municipal borough in 1931, and part of Greater London in 1965.

== History ==
=== Toponymy ===
The name Barking came from Old English Berecingas, meaning either "the settlement of the followers or descendants of a man called Bereca" or "the settlement by the birch trees". In AD 735 the area was Berecingum and was known to mean "dwellers among the birch trees". By AD 1086, it had become Berchingae as evidenced by the manor's entry in the Domesday Book of that year.

=== Manor of Barking ===
Barking was a huge Manor (landholding), first mentioned in a charter in 735 AD (though the Abbey is believed to have been founded in 666 AD). The Manor covered the areas now known as Barking, Dagenham and Ilford. The Manor was held by the Nunnery of Barking.

The Fanshawes were a prominent local family who were lords of the manor of Barking from 1628 to 1857. They owned and lived in a number of manor houses in the borough, including Valence House, Jenkins, Parsloes and Faulks, and gifted the Leet House to the residents of Barking.

=== Parishes ===
The Parishes of England were, with a few exceptions, fixed for around 700 years from the late 12th century onwards. The huge manor of Barking was served by two ancient parishes, Barking and Dagenham. This reversed the usual situation (for smaller, and even quite large manors) where a parish would serve one or more manors. As with other manors, the area held by the manor declined over time, but the parish boundaries based on its former extent remained constant.

A map showing the wards of Barking Parish in 1871. The ancient parish covered both Barking and Ilford.

The parish of Barking covered the areas now known as Barking and Ilford. Barking was a large ancient parish of 12,307 acres (49.80 km^{2}) in the Becontree hundred of Essex. It was divided into the wards of Chadwell, Ilford, Ripple and Town. A local board was formed for Town ward in 1882 and it was extended to cover Ripple ward in 1885. In 1888 Ilford and Chadwell were split off as a new parish of Ilford, leaving a residual parish of 3,814 acres (15.43 km^{2}).

=== Modern local government ===
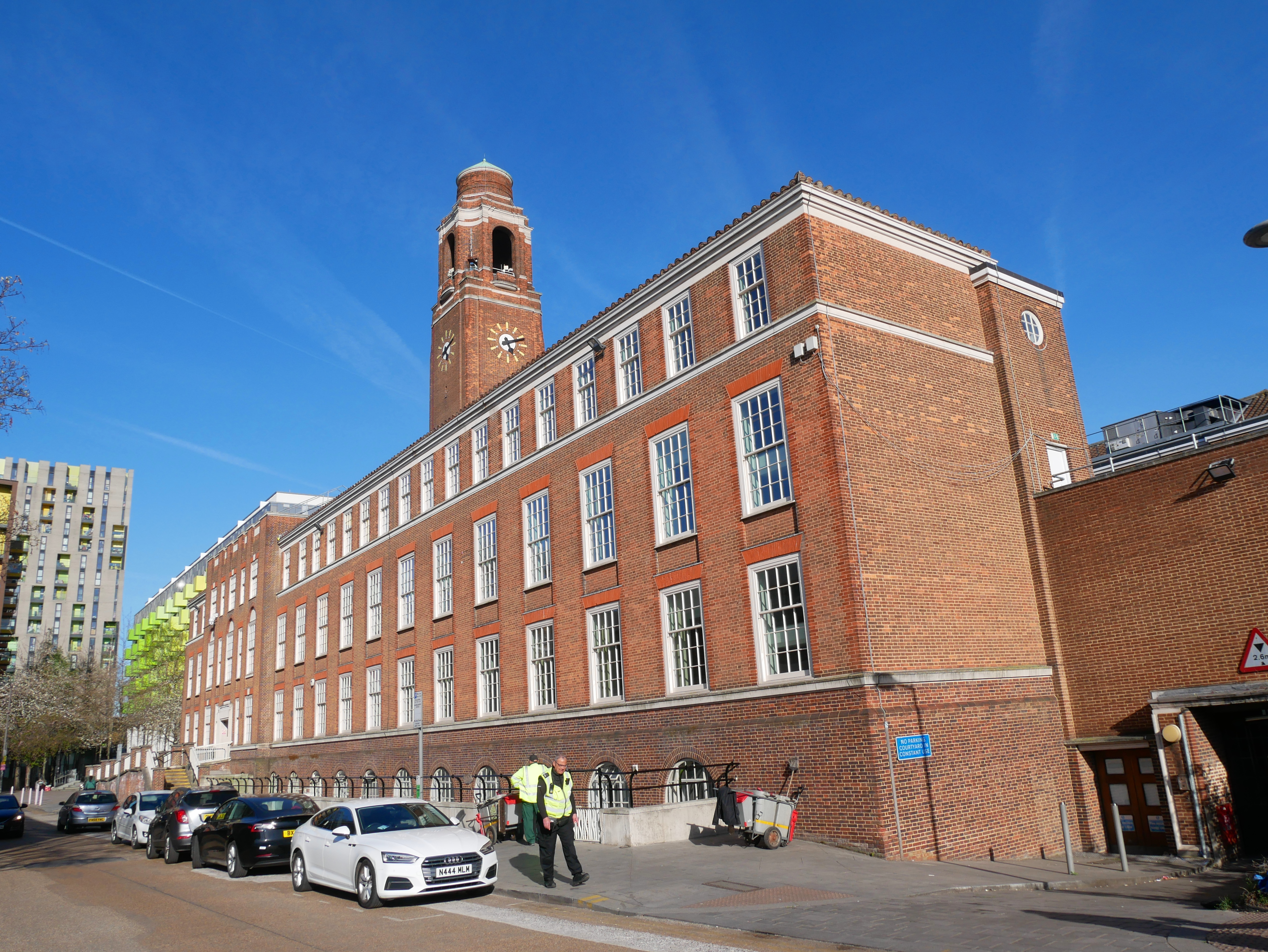
Barking Town Hall, the former town hall of the Municipal Borough of Barking

The parish became Barking Town Urban District in 1894 and the local board became an urban district council. The urban district was incorporated as the Municipal Borough of Barking in 1931. It was abolished in 1965 and split, with the majority merged with the former area of the Municipal Borough of Dagenham to form the London Borough of Barking. The part west of the River Roding, which included part of Beckton, became part of the London Borough of Newham. In 1980 the borough was renamed Barking and Dagenham.

=== Abbey ===
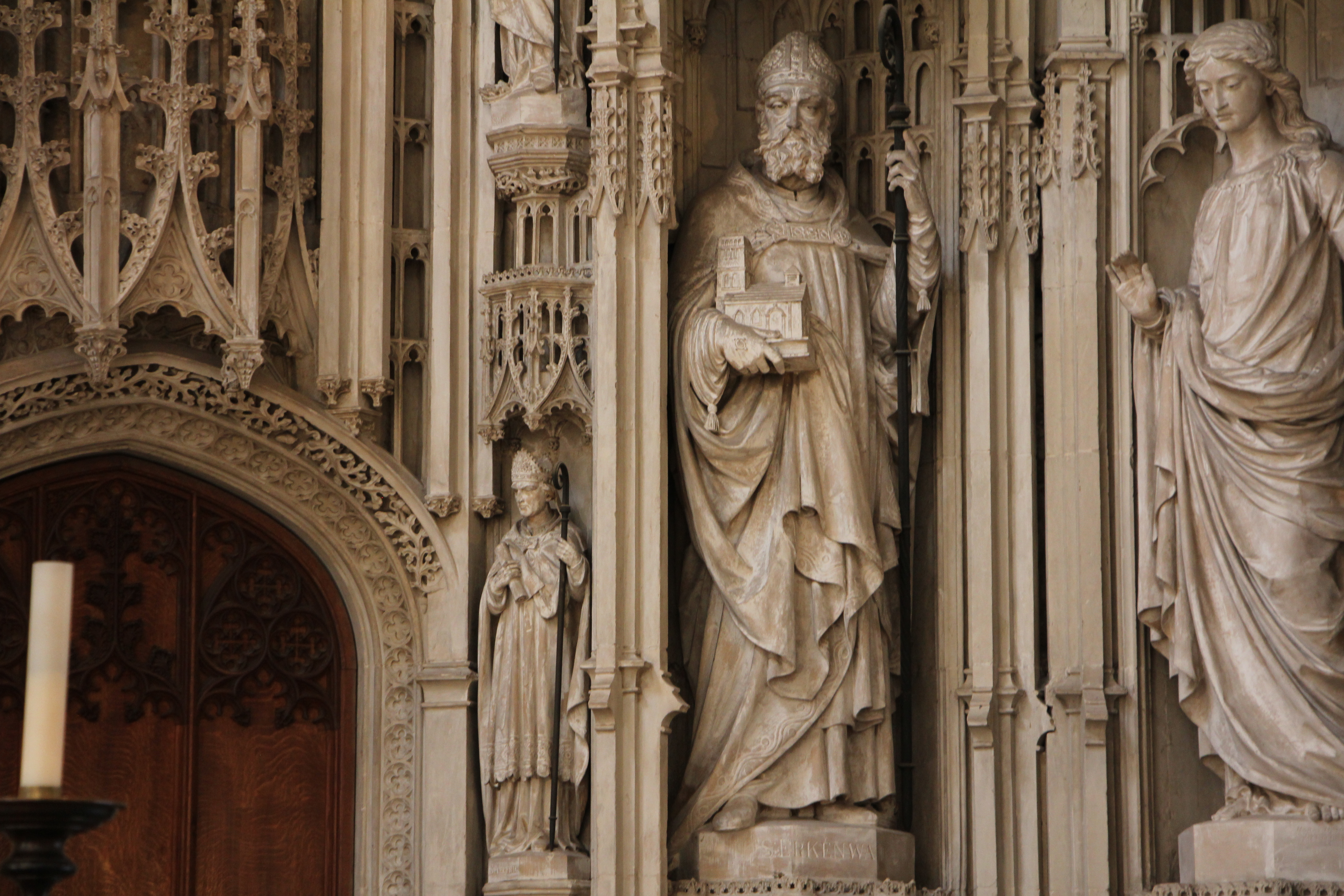
Statue of St Erkenwald, founder of the Abbey

The manor of Barking was the site of Barking Abbey, a nunnery founded in 666 by Eorcenwald, Bishop of London, destroyed by the Danes and reconstructed in 970 by King Edgar. The celebrated writer Marie de France may have been abbess of the nunnery in the late 12th century. At the dissolution of the monasteries in 1536, Barking Abbey was demolished; the parish church of St Margaret, some walling and foundations are all that remain. The parish church is an example of Norman architecture; Captain James Cook married Elizabeth Batts of Shadwell there in 1762, and it is the burial place of many members of the Fanshawe family of Parsloes Manor.

=== Market ===
A charter issued between 1175 and 1179 confirms the ancient market right. The market declined in the 18th century but has since been revived.

=== Architecture: historic buildings ===
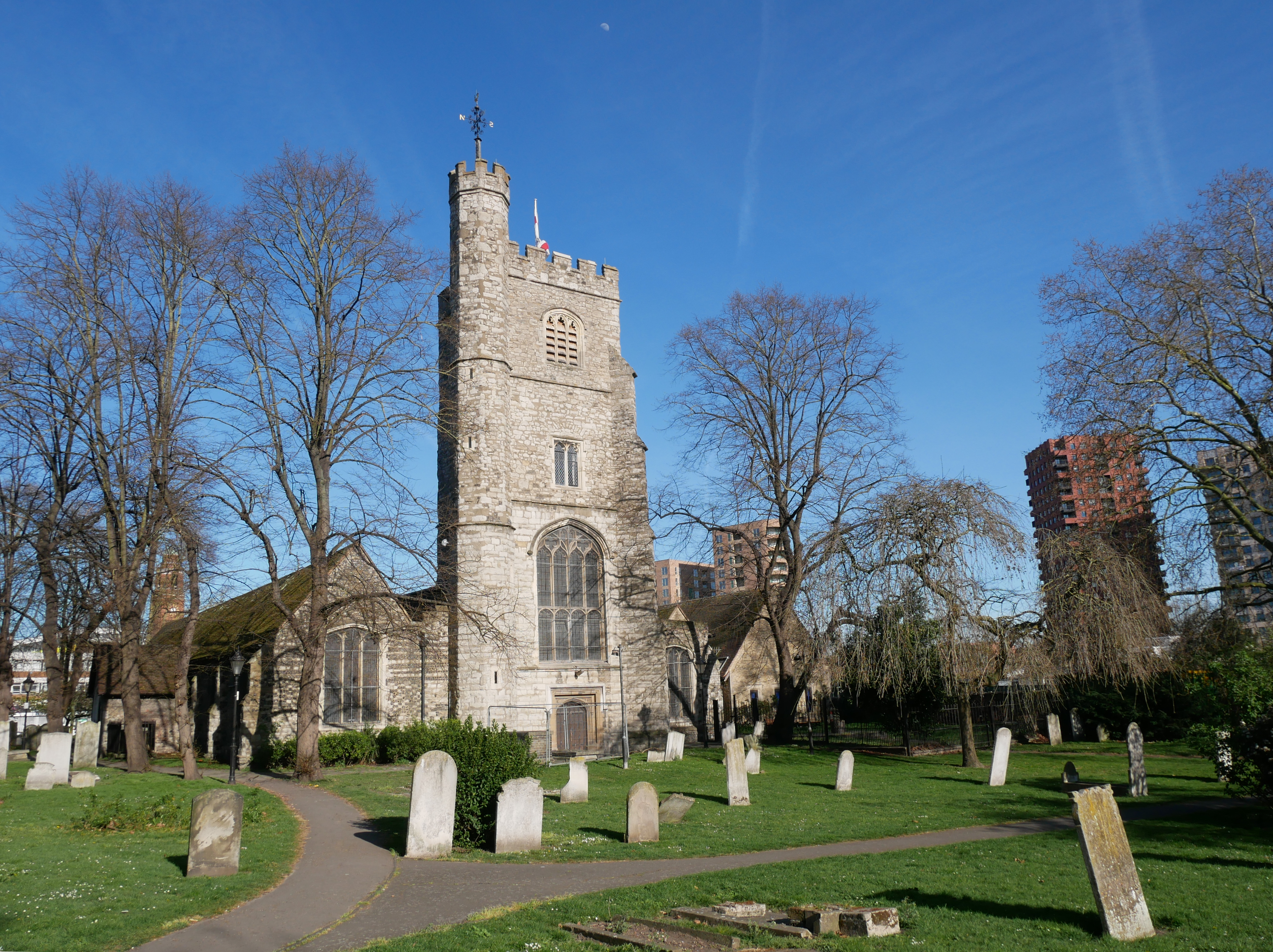
West face of St Margaret's Church

St Margaret's Church is a grade I listed building in the Abbey Green area of the Town Centre, dating back to the 13th century. It is built within the grounds of Barking Abbey, a former royal monastery, whose ruins are recognisable for its partially restored Grade-II* Listed Curfew Tower, which features on the coat of arms of the London Borough of Barking and Dagenham.

Eastbury Manor House in Barking is a Grade I listed 16th century Elizabethan manor house and museum run by the National Trust.

=== Fishing ===
Fishing was the most important industry from the 14th until the mid-19th centuries. Salt water fishing began before 1320, when too fine nets were seized by City authorities, but expanded greatly from the 16th century. Fisher Street (now the southern part of Abbey Road) was named after the fishing community there. From about 1775 welled and dry smacks were used, mostly as cod boats, and rigged as gaff cutters. Fishermen sailed as far as Iceland in the summer. They served Billingsgate Fish Market in the City of London, and moored in Barking Pool. Scymgeour Hewett, born on 7 December 1797, founded the Short Blue Fleet (England's biggest fishing fleet) based in Barking, using smacks out of Barking and east coast ports. Around 1870 this fleet changed to gaff ketches that stayed out at sea for months; to preserve the fish they used ice produced by flooding local fields in winter. Fleeting involved fish being ferried from fishing smacks to gaff cutters by little wooden ferry-boats. The rowers had to stand, as the boats were piled high with fish boxes. Rowers refused to wear their bulky cork lifejackets because it slowed down their rowing. At first the fast 50-foot gaff cutters with great booms projecting beyond the sterns raced the fish to port to get the best prices.

Until about 1870 the trade was mostly in live fish, using welled smacks in which the central section of the hull, between two watertight bulkheads, was pierced to create a 'well' in which seawater could circulate. Cod caught live were lowered into this well, with their swim bladders pierced, and remained alive until the vessel returned to port, when they were transferred to semi-submerged 'chests', effectively cages, which kept them alive until they were ready for sale. At this point they were pulled out and killed with a blow on the head before being despatched to market, where because of their freshness they commanded a high price. People who practised this method of fishing were known as 'codbangers'.

By 1850 there some 220 smacks, employing some 1,370 men and boys. The boats were typically 75 feet (23 m) long carrying up to 50 tons. During the wars of the 17th and 18th centuries they were often used as fleet auxiliaries by the Royal Navy, based at nearby Chatham Dockyard. The opening of rail links between the North Sea ports and London meant it was quicker to transport fish by train straight to the capital rather than waiting for ships to take the longer route down the east coast and up the River Thames. By the 1850s the Thames was so severely polluted that fish kept in chests quickly died. Consequently, the fishery slipped into decline in the second half of the 19th century. The decline was hastened by a storm in December 1863, off the Dutch coast, which caused the deaths of 60 men and damage estimated at £6000–7000. Many of its leading figures, including Hewett & Co, moved to Great Yarmouth and Grimsby. By 1900 Barking had ceased to be a fishing port, leaving only street and pub names as a reminder. A large modern steel sculpture entitled "The Catch" is another reminder. The sculpture is on the roundabout at the end of Fanshawe Avenue. The local fishing heritage is recorded at Valence House Museum.

=== Women's history ===
Barking Abbey was a female monastery founded in the mid 7th Century by St Erkenwald. His sister St Ethelburga was the first Abbess. Until its dissolution by Henry VIII in 1539, the Abbey was a major centre of female learning. It has been described as "perhaps the longest lived...institutional centre of literary culture for women in British history".

The author Mary Wollstonecraft, author of A Vindication of the Rights of Women, lived in Barking, then a small rural market town for some of her childhood. Wollstonecraft was born in Spitalfields in 1759, but the family moved to Barking when her father, a weaver, moved to Barking to try to become a farmer.

Annie Huggett, who died aged 104 in 1996, was from a young age, a prominent local Suffragette activist. Huggett's long life meant she was the last living Suffragette. The Gospel Oak and Barking Overground railway line (generally nicknamed the Goblin for short) is to be renamed the "Suffragette Line" in her honour.

=== Economic development ===
Boat building has a long history, being used for the repair of some royal ships of Henry VIII. In 1848, 5 shipwrights, 4 rope- and line-makers, 6 sail-makers and 4 mast-, pump-, and block-makers are listed in a local trade directory. Hewett & Co continued in boat building and repair until 1899. Other industries replaced the nautical trades, including jute spinning, paint and chemicals manufacture. By 1878 Daniel de Pass had opened the Barking Guano Works (later de Pass Fertilisers Ltd, part of Fisons) at Creekmouth. Creekmouth was also the site of the major Barking Power Station from 1925 until the 1970s, burning coal shipped in by river; the current station known as Barking is further east near Dagenham Dock. In the 20th century new industrial estates were established, and many local residents came to be employed in the car plant at Dagenham.

=== Thames disaster ===
On 3 September 1878 the iron ship Bywell Castle ran into the pleasure steamer Princess Alice in Gallions Reach, downstream of Barking Creek. The paddle steamer was returning from the coast via Sheerness and Gravesend with nearly 800 day-trippers. She broke in two and sank immediately, with the loss of more than 600 lives, the highest single loss of civilian lives in UK territorial waters. At that time there was no official body responsible for marine safety in the Thames; but the official enquiry resolved that the Marine Police Force based at Wapping be equipped with steam launches to replace their rowing boats to help them perform rescues.

=== Historical pageant ===
To mark the incorporation of Barking as a municipal borough, a historical pageant featuring over 2000 performers took place in October 1931. Made of ten acts, the Elizabethan section was performed in part by the local Women's Citizens League.

== Economy ==
Vicarage Field Shopping Centre is located on Ripple Road in Barking town centre. It was opened in November 1990.

== Geography ==
Barking is located 9.3 miles (15 km) east of Charing Cross in Central London. It is bordered by Ilford to the north, Dagenham to the east and East Ham to the west.

=== Town centre ===
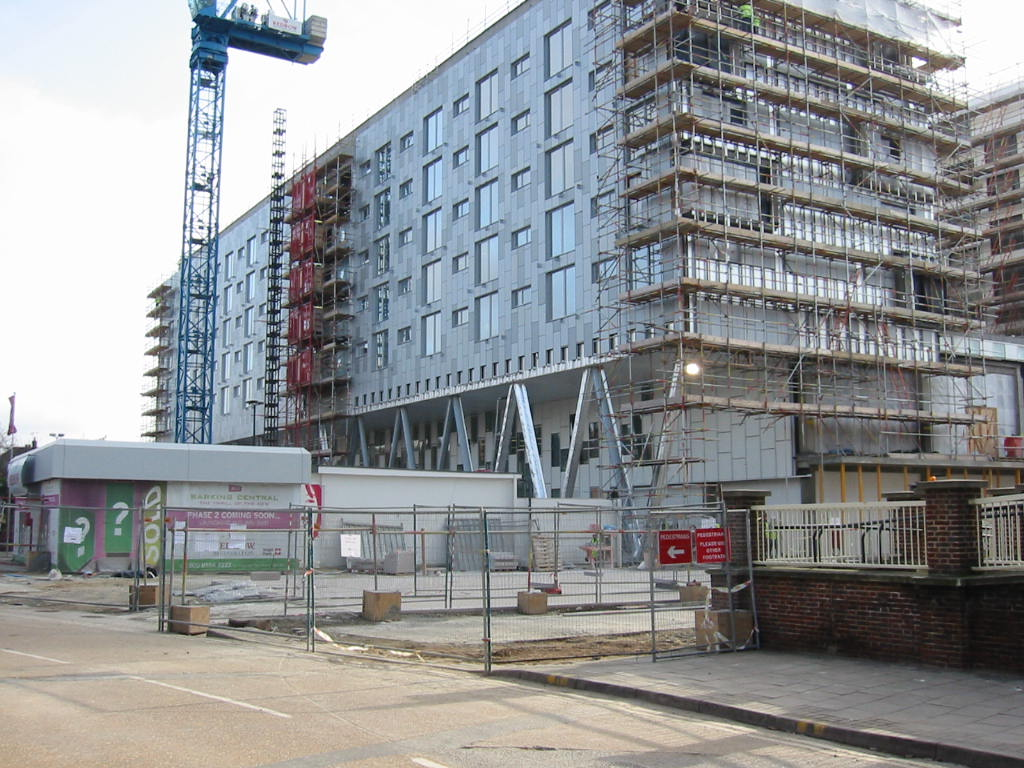
Work underway on the Barking Learning Centre in March 2007. The top three floors contain 166 apartment units. Work was completed in November 2007.

Barking Town Centre is being regenerated through a number of schemes. It is one of the most deprived areas of Barking. The Abbey and Gascoigne wards in the town centre are ranked 823rd and 554th respectively - within the 10% most deprived wards in the country.

The regeneration aims to achieve a more sustainable economy by investing in new quality retail outlets and creating a business centre; and to widen employment prospects, mainly by creating new "retail and business accommodation", to increase the income of both existing and new residents. The regeneration also aims to improve people's skills. This is mainly achieved through the Barking Learning Centre, which aims to improve literacy, numeracy and other basic skills people may be lacking due to a previous lack of educational development. It currently acts as a borough-based learning facility. It was officially opened on 10 June 2008 by John Denham, Secretary of State for Innovation, Universities and Skills.

The town centre development intends to improve the quality and range of housing, aiming to create 4,000 new homes: 25% will be intermediate housing, affordable for local residents to buy. There will be 4,000 socially rented homes, making it easier for first-time buyers and people with low incomes to rent a property. To help make the development more sustainable, all private sector homes were to meet the Government's decency standards by 2010.

Plans for the new town square were unveiled in September 2007. The development is part of the Mayor of London's 100 Public Spaces, and it was completed in 2008, designed by muf architecture/art and Allford Hall Monaghan and Morris. It won the European Prize for Urban Public Space.

=== Roding Riverside ===
Roding Riverside is a name given to an area of Barking comprising the stretch of Abbey Road south of St Pauls Road, which runs parallel to the River Roding / Barking Creek and the area between. The quarter is post-industrial. Many buildings are late 20th century or early 21st century residential and commercial buildings, but some are Victorian industrial buildings adapted for use in arts and leisure fields, including a contemporary art gallery (the Laura I Gallery), with a view to regenerating the area in part by drawing out the industrial heritage architecture.

One such Victorian building is a former Malthouse. Adjacent to this building stands a cluster of buildings together styled the Ice House Quarter, which includes a former Ice House and a former Boat House

A new building, Ice House Court references the old Ice House and provides more artist studio space.

=== Barking Riverside ===
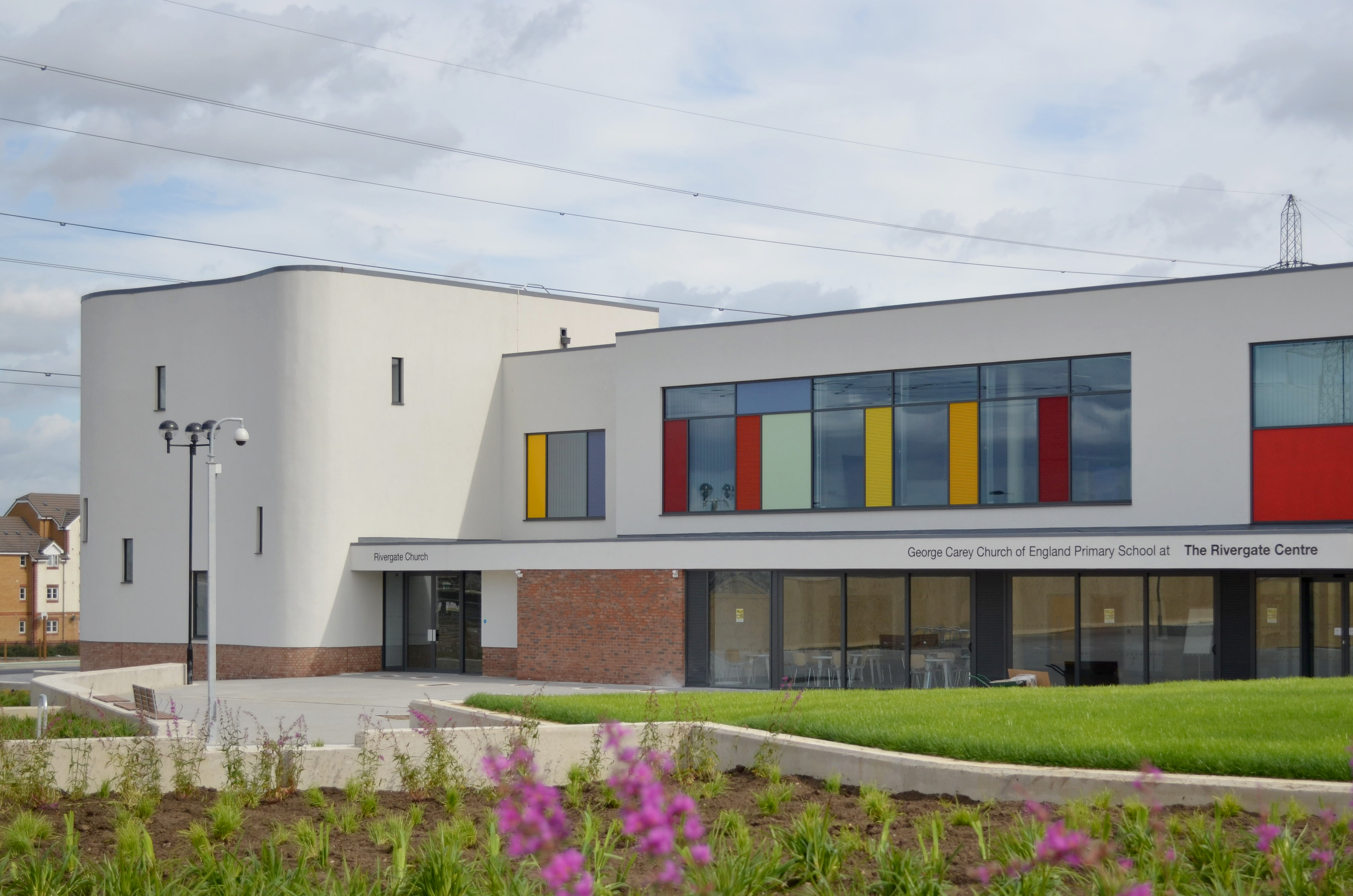
Rivergate Centre, Barking, London

The Barking Riverside development is part of the London Riverside project, which aims to regenerate the Thames riverside area of East London through new homes, jobs, and services. Barking Riverside consists of 350 acres (1.4 km^{2}) of brownfield land and therefore needs site clearance and the removal of overhead power lines before it can go ahead. Construction began in 2008, with completion due around 2025. 10,000 homes are to be built, housing around 25,000 people. New transport links will be provided, including East London Transit and the extension of the Docklands Light Railway at Barking Riverside DLR station, and the extension of the Gospel Oak to Barking line of the London Overground from Barking railway station to Barking Riverside, completed in 2022.

Barking and Dagenham Council has said that it does not believe the 10,800-home brownfield development to be viable without improved transport connections, and expects that the Treasury is likely to confirm funding in the Chancellor of the Exchequer's Autumn 2013 statement. The development will also provide new public facilities, creating "a variety of living, working, leisure and cultural amenities". Two new primary schools and one secondary school will be built, and the public will have access to two kilometres of Thames river front. The Rivergate Centre, designed by van Heyningen and Haward Architects, provides the civic facilities for the initial phase of Barking Riverside, while a new square and 3FE primary school, which includes embedded community facilities, a nursery, church, flexible office suites for the PCT and Community Development Trust, as well as a MUGA and sports pitches are also planned. As yet unbuilt, the second phase provides 90 flats, local shops and a neighbourhood police post.

== Demography ==
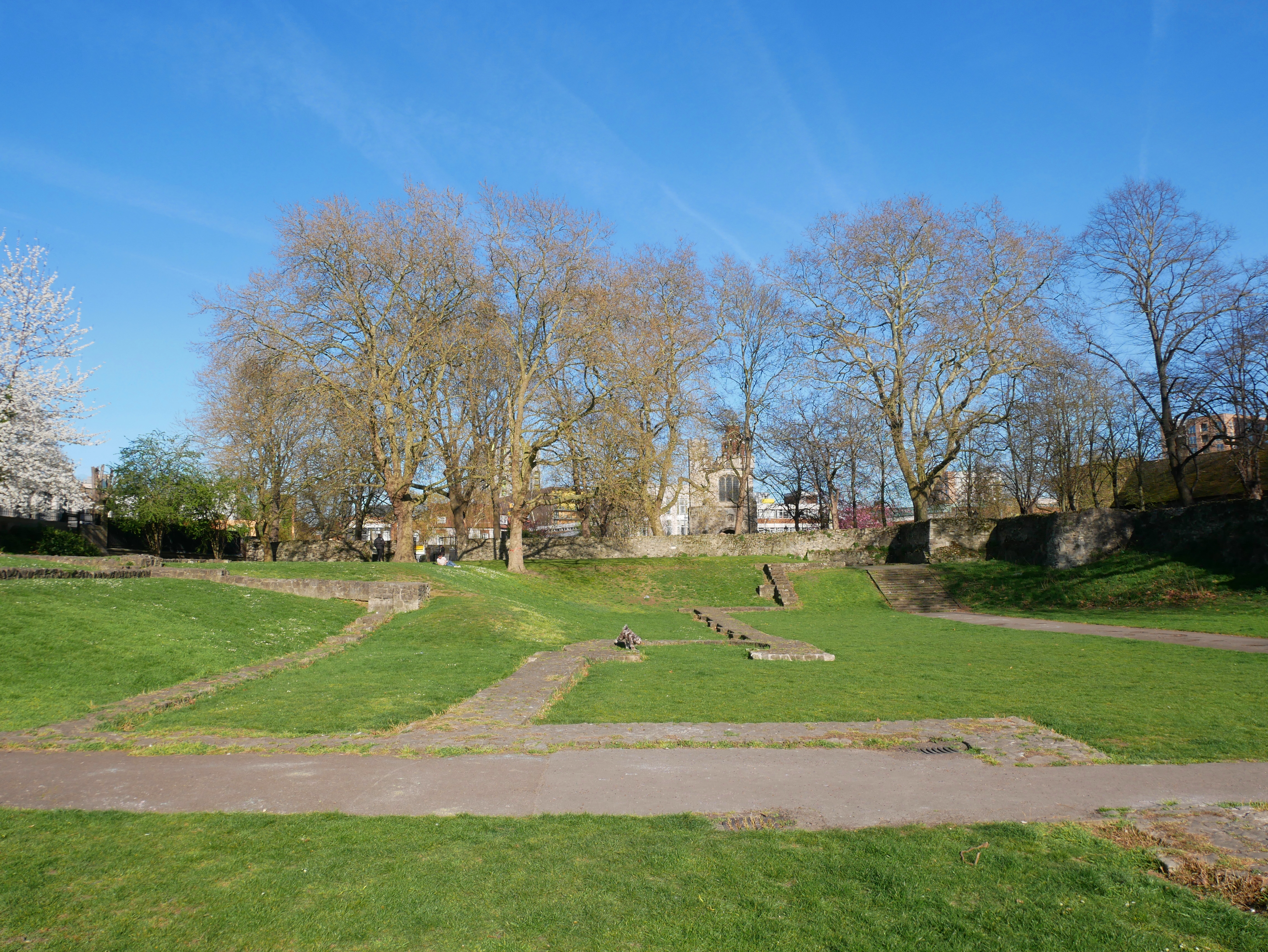
Part of the ruins of Barking Abbey, now a public park

The population of Barking in the 1841 census was 3,751.

In recent years, as a result of increased levels of immigration, Barking's population has become more multicultural and ethnically diverse, with growing South Asian and African communities forming a significant proportion of the local population. Between the 2001 and 2011 censuses, the White British population in the local borough fell by 38.75 per cent. Local businesses and places of worship reflect Barking's diversity, with churches of various Christian denominations, mosques and gurdwaras serving as major community hubs.

In the 2011 census, the largest ethnic group in Abbey ward (which covers Barking town centre) was Pakistani at 17%, followed by 16% White British, 15% Black African, 13% Indian and 11% Other White. Gascoigne ward (southern Barking) was 26% White British, 26% Black African and 13% Other White. Longbridge ward (eastern Barking) was 35% White British, 18% Bangladeshi and 11% Pakistani.

Barking's population grew steadily after urbanisation began in the late 19th century. Barking's population (if defined as approximating to the Abbey, Eastbury, Gascoigne and Longbridge wards) was 48,340 in 2011.

Barking (parish) population
1881 (may include Ilford)	16,848
1891	14,301
1901	21,547
1911	31,294
1921	35,523
1931	51,270
1941	#
1951	78,170
1961	72,293
# no census was held due to war
source: UK census

== Education ==
Primary schools include Northbury Primary School, Eastbury Primary School, St Margaret's Church of England and St Joseph's Roman Catholic.

Secondary schools include Barking Abbey School. Lady Aisha Academy is an independent Muslim Girls Secondary School which opened in September 2011 on Victoria Road.

== Transport ==
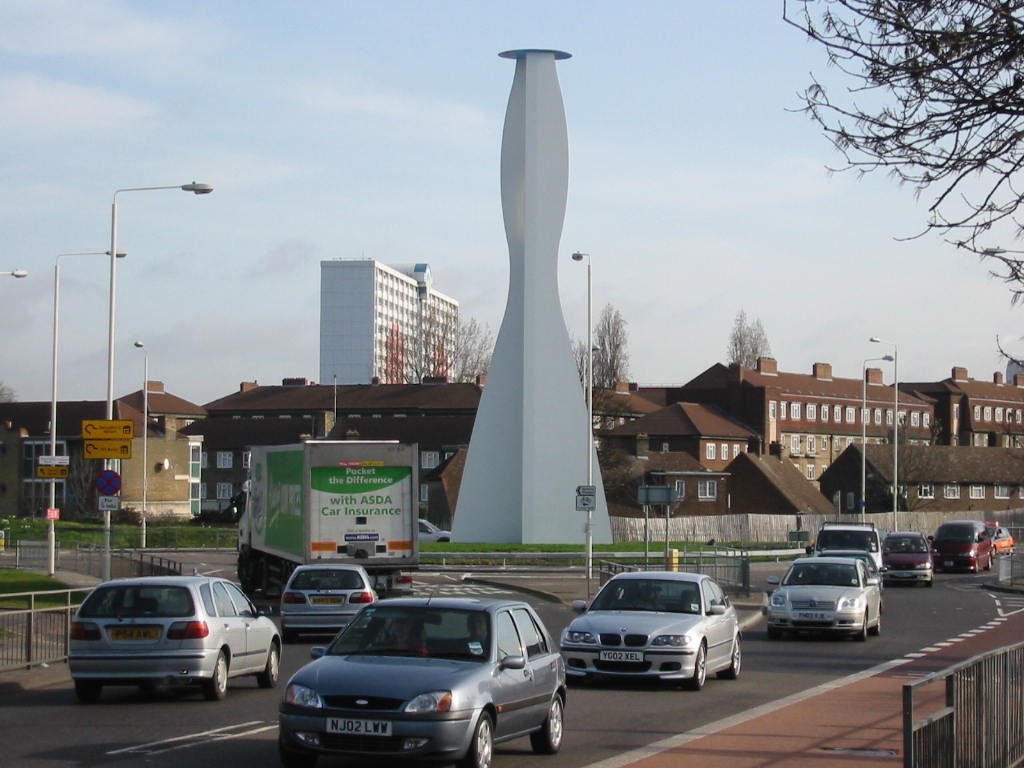
The Lighted Lady of Barking, public art at junction of Abbey Road and London Road

The town is situated mostly north of the A13 road and east of the River Roding near its confluence with the River Thames in east London. The Thames View Estate, Barking Reach (a small housing estate) and Barking Riverside are south of the A13. The South Woodford to Barking Relief Road (part of the A406 North Circular Road) runs through the Roding Valley, and access to the town centre is by its junction with the A124, which until the late 1920s was the main route to and from London. Barking station is a local transport hub and is served by the London Underground, London Overground, c2c and London Bus and East London Transit routes. The east of Barking is served by Upney Underground station and the area south of the A13 is served by Barking Riverside railway station. The East London Transit bus rapid transit has a station beside the Vicarage Field Shopping Centre. The western end of the Yiwu-London railway line from China to the UK is located in Barking at the DB Eurohub. It ran its first service in January 2017.

== Culture ==
=== Music ===
Neil Young recorded two tracks for his classic album Harvest, "A Man Needs a Maid" and "There's a World" with the London Symphony Orchestra at Barking Assembly Hall (now the Broadway theatre), released in 1972.

Electronic band Underworld named their 2010 album Barking after the town. The band are associated with nearby Romford. The artist Ramz wrote a song called "Barking" in 2017.

=== Local media ===
Bedrock is the local hospital radio service available online to the local area and broadcasting a range of health-related information focused on the local King George Hospital in Goodmayes and Queen's Hospital in Romford.

The Barking & Dagenham Post provides local news in print and online.

=== Sport ===
Barking F.C. are a non-league side. The team merged with East Ham F.C. to form Barking & East Ham United in 2001. This club later struggled and went out of business, but Barking F.C. was later reformed once again. Barking RFC are the town's rugby union team. Cricket, basketball and hockey are also popular sports in the area. A Parkrun takes place in Barking Park.

=== Public art works ===
Barking Town Centre has a number of recently commissioned sculptures and public art works.

In 2007, two small stones from remains of the medieval London Bridge were joined in a sculpture in front of St Margaret's church facing the Barking Abbey ruins as part of several public artworks placed in Barking Town Centre by artist Joost Van Santen.

== Notable people ==
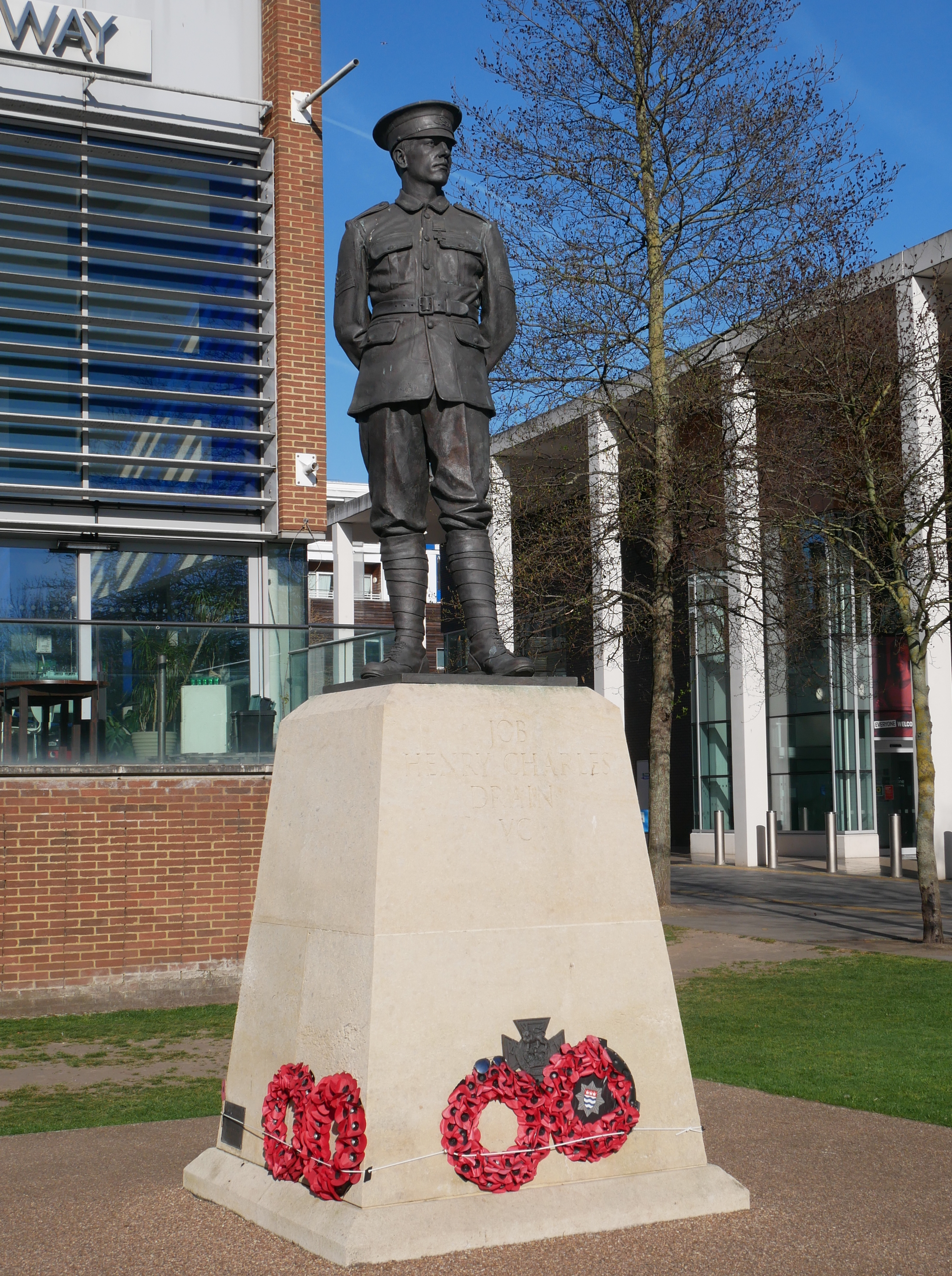
Statue of Job Henry Charles Drain in Barking, erected 2009

Notable footballers from Barking include former England captains and defenders Bobby Moore and John Terry. Racing driver Scott Malvern, who won British and European Championships in Formula Ford and Formula Renault, was born in Barking Hospital. Jason Leonard, who won 119 caps as a rugby union prop forward, was born in Barking and began his club career at Barking RFC.

The singer-songwriter and activist Billy Bragg was born in Barking, as was U2 guitarist The Edge, and singer Megan McKenna.

Actor Danny Lee Wynter was born in Barking.

== See also ==
- List of people from Barking and Dagenham
- List of schools in Barking and Dagenham
