= Eastbury Community School =

Location
- Hulse Ave; Barking; London, IG11 9UW; England; 51.54107°N 0.09007°E

Information
- Type: Community school
- Established: 1931
- Local authority: Barking and Dagenham
- Department for Education URN: 101244 Tables
- Ofsted: Reports
- Head teacher: Sharon Collins
- Gender: Co-educational
- Age: 3 to 18
- Enrolment: 2000+
- Website: https://www.eastbury.bardaglea.org.uk/

Eastbury Community School is a co-educational all-through school and sixth form located in the Barking area of the London Borough of Barking and Dagenham, England.

== History ==
Eastbury Secondary School was founded at Dawson Ave in 1931. After the implementation of the tripartite system, it became a secondary modern. It merged with South East Essex Secondary Technical School in 1970 and moved to Rosslyn Road to become Eastbury Comprehensive School when the scheme was abolished. The school then covered two locations, a "lower" site in Rosslyn Road, accommodating Years 7-8 and, an "upper" site in Dawson Avenue, for Years 9-13. Eastbury merged the two sites so that it is now solely based in Rosslyn Road, alluding to extensions of the site, modernised buildings and facilities and a general 'revamp' of the premises. This site was later used to film the BBC children's TV drama M.I. High.

In 2006 Eastbury joined the specialist schools programme, specialising in Mathematics and Information Communication Technology. The school was renamed to Eastbury Community School because a primary school provision was constructed within the school grounds. The primary school provision opened in 2015 and the extra provision has made Eastbury one of the biggest schools in Barking and Dagenham.

== Use of technology ==
The school's Sixth Form is the only one in London to have a Cisco Networking Academy.

In 2010, the school was the first in Barking and Dagenham to introduce a cashless payment system using a contactless smart card. The Street Base Connect Card also gives access to youth, health, leisure and library services.

== Notable former pupils ==
- Ian and Jamie McNaughton, members of the Britain's Got Talent-winning dance troupe Diversity, left the school in 1999 and 2001 respectively.
- Sara Pascoe, comedian.
- Bobby Moore, the former England and West Ham United Captain also attended the school, and was on the school teams for both football and cricket.
- John Terry, professional footballer who played for and captained Chelsea.
- Yunus Musah, professional football player who plays for AC Milan in Serie A.
- Jack Baldwin, professional footballer
- Sorba Thomas, professional footballer who played for Wales
