= Mayesbrook Park =

Public park in London, England

Coordinates: 51.5403°N 0.1111°E

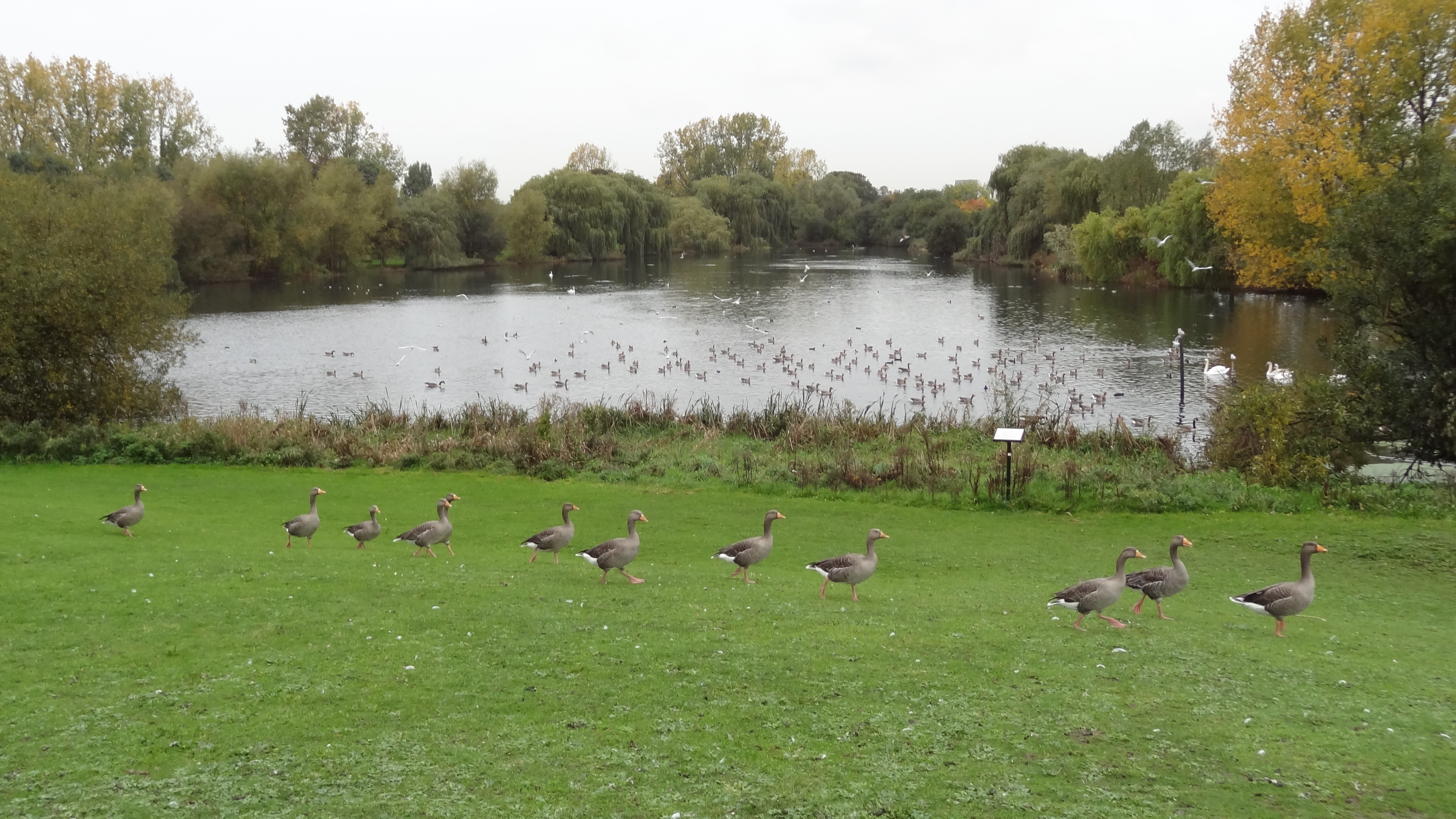

Mayesbrook Park is a 43-hectare public park in the London Borough of Barking and Dagenham and in the post town of Dagenham and the pre-1965 borough of Barking. It is owned and managed by the borough council. The southern end, which is mainly a large lake, is a Local Nature Reserve.[broken link] The area covered by the park was once part of the historic Manor of Jenkins, seat of the Fanshawe family. For reasons which remain obscure, the park is nicknamed "Matchstick Island".

The park, which was opened in 1934, was created to meet the need for open space for the London County Council's Becontree Housing Estate. The park has a car park, a children's play area, football pitches, a cricket pitch and pavilion, an athletic track, tennis courts, basketball court, and lakes. The Mayesbrook Park project has used green infrastructure engineering to address flood water management needs. It is designated as metropolitan open land, which provides a high level of protection from development.

The southern end has two large lakes which are rich in wildlife, newly planted woodland and rough grassland. The Mayes Brook, a tributary of the River Roding, runs along the western edge. There is access from Lodge Avenue.

Since 2002, Mayesbrook is also a ward of the London Borough of Barking and Dagenham. The population of the ward at the 2011 census was 10,342. The boundaries were revised in 2022.
