= St Patrick's Church, Barking =

Church in Barking, London

Coordinates: 51.5337°N 0.0952°E

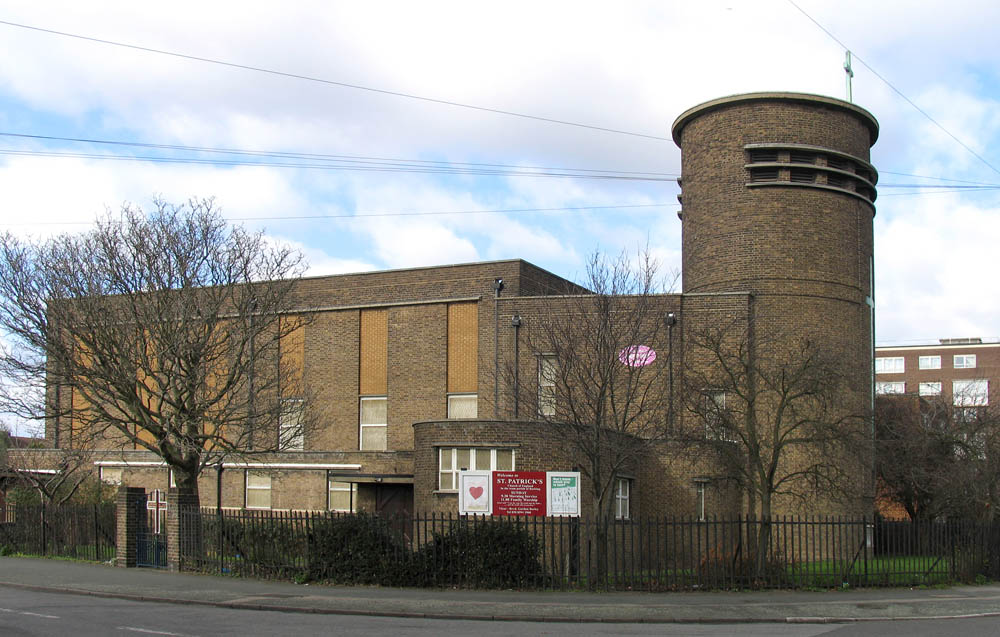
St Patrick's Church, Barking

St Patrick's Church is a grade II listed church on Blake Avenue in the Eastbury district in Barking. It was formed in 1924 as the temporary Church of the Ascension, which was turned into a parish hall in 1940 after being replaced by the permanent brown-brick church, dedicated to Saint Patrick and designed in the Moderne style by A. E. Wiseman. A parish was formed for the permanent church in 1939 by splitting an area off from that of St Margaret's. In 1959 Christ Church, Barking, was added to the parish of St Patrick's as a chapel of ease. Christ Church, St Patrick's and St Margaret's formed a single team parish from the late 1970s until 1 January 2017 when each became a parish it its own right..
