= Parsloes Manor =

- Interactive map of the Parsloes Manor area

General information
- Status: Demolished
- Location: Dagenham, United Kingdom
- Coordinates: 51.5443°N 0.1303°E
- Renovated: 1819
- Demolished: 1925

Parsloes Manor was a manor house in what is now known as Parsloes Park in Dagenham in the London Borough of Barking and Dagenham. In 1585, it was described as containing 10 messuages, a cottage, 10 gardens, 2 orchards, 100 acres of arable land, 20 acres of meadow, 50 of pasture 30 of wood and 40 rent.

In 1619, William Fanshawe purchased the house and 91 acres attached to it for £1150 from Edward Osborne. The house was owned by the Fanshawe family for over 300 years.

In 1819, it was enlarged, the walls were faced with new brick and the windows were replaced in a neo-gothic manner. The house fell into disrepair and was demolished in 1925.
