= Eastbrook School =

Coordinates: 51.5562°N 0.2596°E

Eastbrook Comprehensive School

Location
- Dagenham Road; London, RM10 7UR; England

Information
- Type: Community school
- Motto: Together We Learn
- Established: 1933
- Local authority: Barking and Dagenham
- Department for Education URN: 101243 Tables
- Ofsted: Reports
- Executive headteachers: Tony Roe
- Staff: Approx 100 teaching staff
- Gender: Mixed
- Age: 4 to 18
- Enrolment: 1500
- Houses: Aligator, Hawk, Bear, Lion (secondary) Einstein, Curie, Johnson, Hawking (primary)
- Colours: Green, Red, Blue, Yellow
- Website: https://www.eastbrookschool.org/

Eastbrook School is a coeducational primary school, secondary school and sixth form located in Barking and Dagenham, London, England.

The Executive Headteacher is Tony Roe. The secondary headteacher is Jamie Gibson and the Primary Headteacher is Evan Hollows.

== Notable alumni ==
- Ron Pember (actor)
- Tony Adams (footballer)
- Paul Konchesky (footballer)
- Jack Kendall (rugby union)
