= Barking Learning Centre =

Community centre in London, England

Coordinates: 51.5364°N 0.0798°E

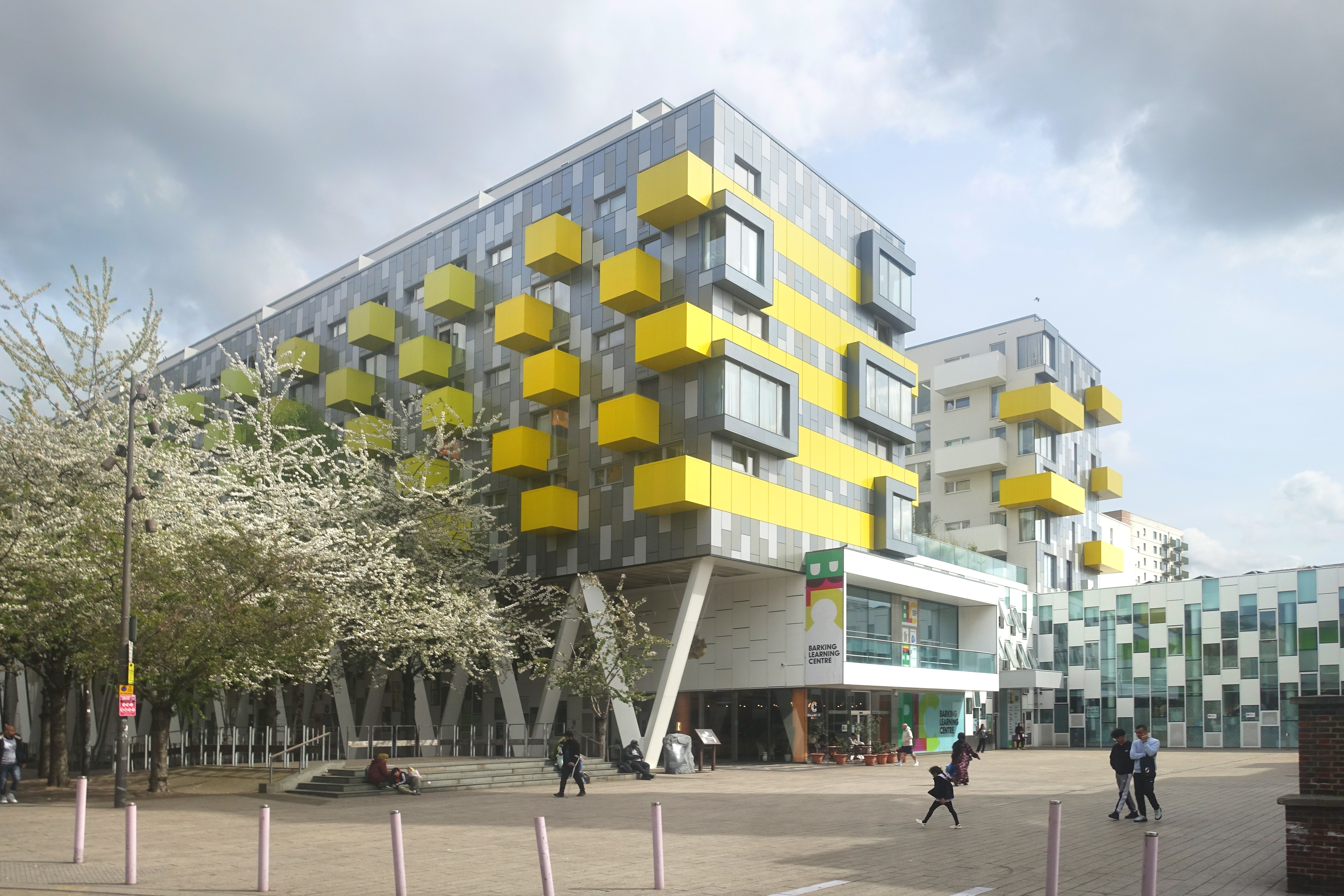
- Barking Learning Centre in 2025
- Interactive map of the Barking Learning Centre area

General information
- Location: Barking, London, United Kingdom

The Barking Learning Centre, in the London Borough of Barking and Dagenham, is a community-based learning facility. The centre is located in Barking Town Square and hosts a library, a cafe, an art gallery, a sauna and spa, and offers a range of courses and qualifications. It was constructed on the site of the much-lamented former Barking Library. Work was completed in November 2007.

The Barking Learning Centre website states that its primary focus:

"is to provide education and training opportunities linked to the public service areas of health, education, social care and administration, to support increased participation to learning locally".

The Barking Learning Centre was officially opened on 10 June 2008 by John Denham, the then Secretary of State for Innovation, University and Skills.

== Courses ==
Courses at the Barking Learning Centre include health, education, social care, and recreation. The courses are provided by Barking and Dagenham College, the Adult College of Barking and Dagenham, and the University of East London.
