= Goresbrook School =

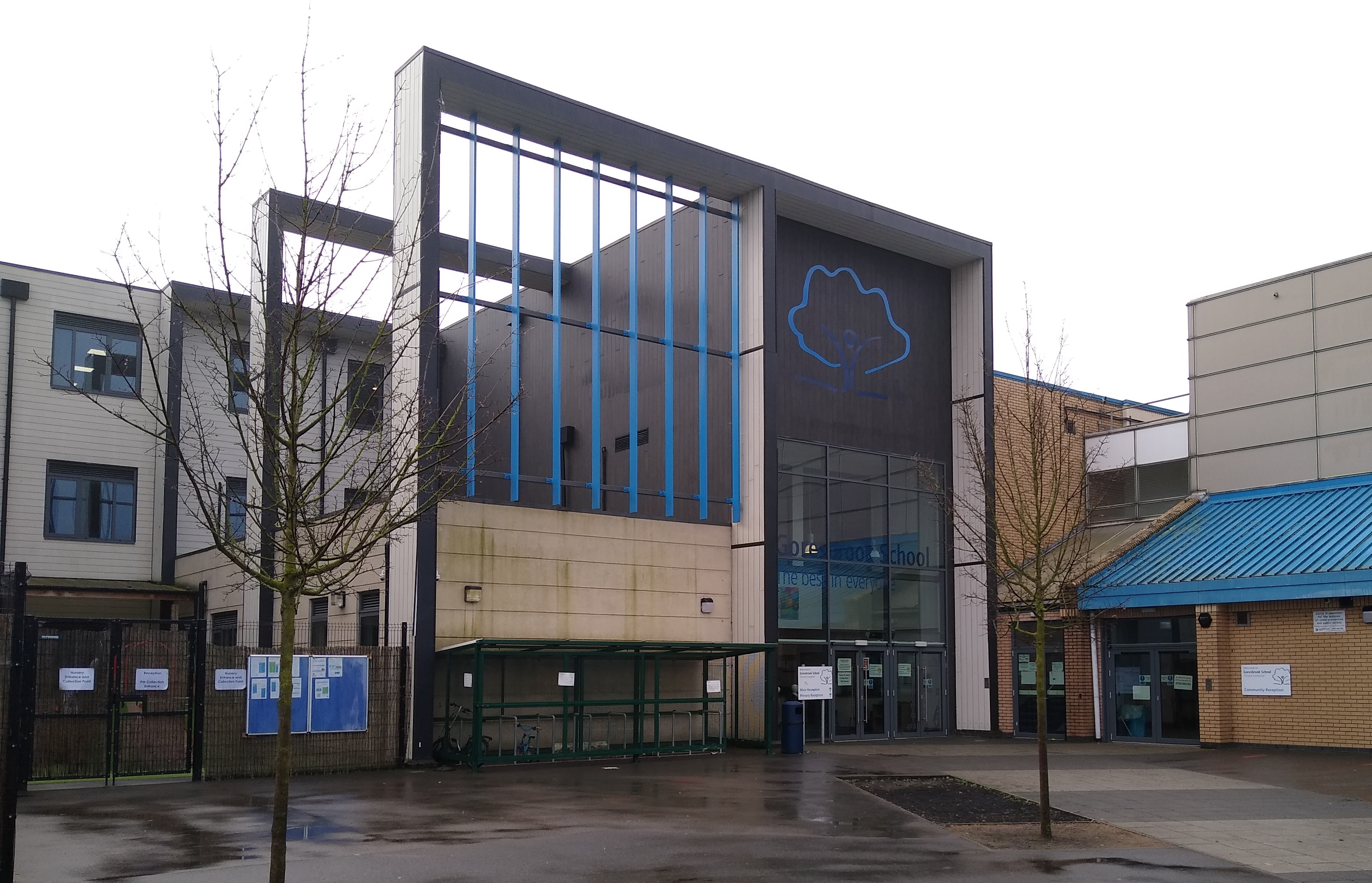

Location
- Cook Road; Dagenham; London, RM9 6XW; England; 51.53256°N 0.130315°E

Information
- Type: Free school
- Motto: The best in everyone
- Established: 1 September 2014
- Local authority: London Borough of Barking and Dagenham
- Department for Education URN: 140962 Tables
- Ofsted: Reports
- Principal: Meghan Harris
- Gender: Mixed
- Age: 4 to 18
- Enrolment: 1,055
- Website: www.goresbrookschool.org.uk

Goresbrook School is a mixed all-through free school in Dagenham in the London Borough of Barking and Dagenham. The school is run by the United Learning organisation.

The school opened in September 2014 on the site of the Goresbrook Leisure Centre. At full capacity the school will accommodate 1,355 children aged 3–18.

== Description ==
The principal of the secondary phase was appointed in April 2018. The principal of the primary phase has been in post since April 2017. Goresbrook School is a member of the United Learning Trust, a multi-academy trust governed by a trust board. The trust has established a local governing body with delegated powers for Goresbrook School. There is a year R entry, which filtered upwards through Key Stage 1 and Key Stage 2. The primary school is now full.

The secondary phase of the school catered at first for pupils in Key Stage 3, and now Key Stage 4 as well. In 2020, it had its first Year 5 GCSE exam entry. The proportion of disadvantaged pupils is above the national average, and the proportion of pupils with SEND is above that of other schools. The proportion of pupils who have an education, health and care plan is below the national average.

== Building ==
The school is built on the site of the Goresbrook Leisure Centre, and the new school building took the existing two storey leisure facilities and gyms, and extended it by interlinking with two new build three storey teaching wings. The contract for the project was won by Blue Sky Architect Group. The structure was built primarily off-site, using modular construction.
