= Robert Clack School =

Location
- Gosfied Road (upper site); Green Lane (lower site); Lymington Field (2020 site); Dagenham, Greater London, RM8 1JU/RM8 1AL; England; 51.5618°N 0.14565°E

Information
- Type: Community school
- Motto: forti difficile nihil (nothing is difficult for the brave) Latin
- Established: 1955
- Local authority: Barking and Dagenham
- Department for Education URN: 101245 Tables
- Ofsted: Reports
- Headteacher: Russell Taylor
- Gender: Coeducational
- Age: 11 to 18
- Enrolment: 4,790
- Capacity: 2,400
- Website: https://robertclack.co.uk

Robert Clack School is an eighteen form entry comprehensive school in the London Borough of Barking and Dagenham. and located on three sites, each of which a six form entry secondary school. Russell Taylor is the headteacher of Robert Clack School. He is a former pupil of the school and joined the teaching staff in 2002. As the senior deputy head from 2008 until August 2017, Taylor worked closely with the previous headteacher before being appointed as headteacher in September 2017.

== History ==
The Robert Clack Technical School opened in 1955 and was named after the former Mayor of the borough of Dagenham who died in 1953. In 1970 it amalgamated with the Triptons Secondary Modern School and became the Robert Clack Comprehensive School. The school is split into two sites: the Lower School (formerly Triptons Secondary Modern) and the Upper School (formerly Robert Clack Technical School). The school is heavily oversubscribed accommodating over 2,050 students. In September 2015 it was revealed that Barking and Dagenham London Borough Council were considering asking Robert Clack School to significantly expand to accommodate 2,500 pupils, which would make the Robert Clack the biggest secondary school in England.

The school is home to the United Kingdom's largest school council, with over 120 members who actively participate in policy making, welcoming visitors, conducting events and other aspect of school life as well as assisting senior management in making decisions. In 2009 Ofsted highlighted it as one of 12 outstanding schools serving disadvantaged communities.

== Buildings ==
As of August 2020 the school has four separate buildings located on the Green Lane Site (lower school site). Those are the following: Main building, Sports Hall/Gym and T Block (Maths Block). Teaching in the Y7 block began in September 2018 and it was a building made specially for Year 7 pupils, but that was later stopped as it was transformed into the Maths Block. This Y7 block became a maths block for the maths department as of September 2019. They also have a D Block consisting of a few offices and the LSC (Learning Support Centre)

The upper school site is to the east, to the north of the Civic Centre.

The new site made in July 2020, is the Lymington Fields site, which in September 2020 is designed to accommodate 45 nursery pupils, 630 primary school pupils (3-form entry) and 900 secondary school (6-form entry). This site adjoins the lower school site, and is reached through pathways through the sports fields The upper school site has 4 main buildings and also has excellent sports areas and equipment, better than the other sites. The upoer site no longer just has the older years but has years seven to Sixth form.

== Notable alumni ==
A number of notable people have attended the school including:

- The members of the 80s pop group Five Star
- Nicky Cook, boxing champion
- Aaron McLean, Bradford City striker
- Declan Rice, Arsenal and England midfielder
- Sandie Shaw, British Eurovision singer

== Debate Championship ==
In 2016 three pupils from Robert Clack represented the United Kingdom in a world debating championship held in Japan. They made it to the Semi-Final of the competition and placed Third.

== Royal visits ==
In 2007, Charles, Prince of Wales (later King Charles III) visited Robert Clack School, 13 years later in March 2020 his daughter-in-law, Meghan, Duchess of Sussex visited Robert Clack and delivered a speech marking International Women's Day. This was the Duchess’ last solo engagement as a working royal before stepping back in late March 2020.
