= The Eastbrook =

Listed pub in Dagenham, London, England

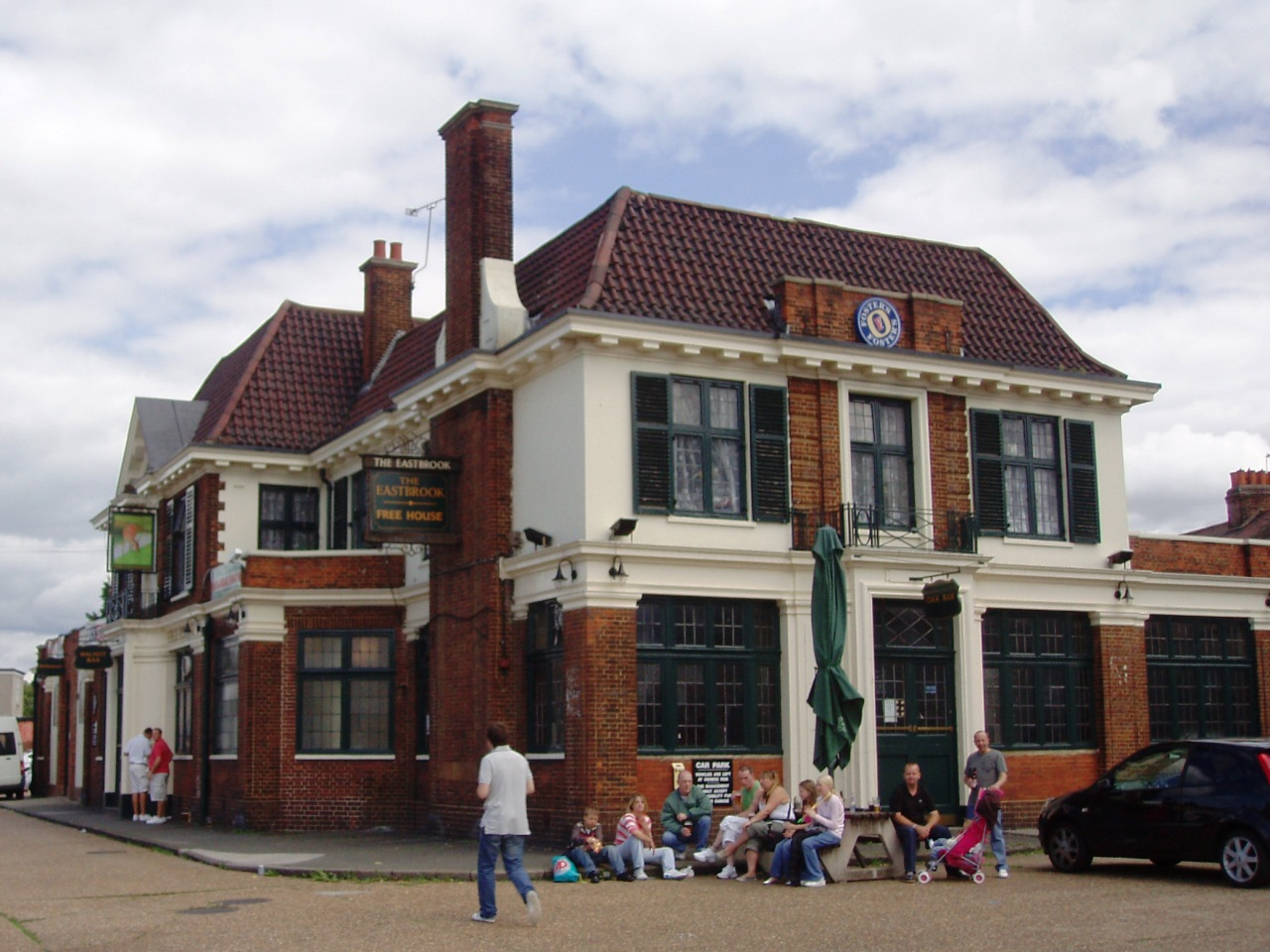
- The pub in 2008

- Location within Barking and Dagenham Location within Greater London
- Former names: Eastbrook Hotel

General information
- Architectural style: Neo-Georgian
- Location: 835 Dagenham Road, Dagenham, London, England
- Coordinates: 51.5510°N 0.1632°E
- Year built: 1937–1938; 88 years ago
- Client: G. A. Smith and Dunning
- Owner: Eastbrook Holdings Ltd

Design and construction
- Designations

Listed Building – Grade II*
- Official name: Eastbrook public house
- Designated: 11 December 2009
- Reference no.: 1393600

Website
- eastbrookpub.co.uk

The Eastbrook is a Grade II* listed public house on Dagenham Road in Dagenham, London, England. Built in 1937–38 for G. A. Smith and Dunning, it is regarded as a particularly complete example of an inter-war improved roadhouse pub, retaining much of its original plan, fittings and decoration. Its largely unaltered interior is recognised by the Campaign for Real Ale (CAMRA) as being of "outstanding national historic importance".

== History ==
The Eastbrook was constructed as a public house in 1937–38 for the brewery company G. A. Smith and Dunning. It is regarded as a particularly complete inter-war "improved" roadhouse pub, retaining an extensive range of original features. The building has also been cited as a notable example of suburban development along arterial roads between the First and Second World Wars.

On 11 December 2009, The Eastbrook was designated a Grade II* listed building. It was included on the Campaign for Real Ale (CAMRA)'s National Inventory of Historic Pub Interiors before the inventory's grading system was revised. Under the revised scheme, it is rated three stars and its interior is regarded as being "of outstanding national historic importance". As of July 2026 the pub's freehold is owned by Eastbrook Holdings Ltd.

== Architecture ==
=== Exterior ===
Built in a Neo-Georgian style, the two-storey building is constructed of red brick with a rendered upper floor, a tiled roof and prominent brick chimneys. The main frontage is centred on an entrance leading to the Walnut Bar, marked by a porch and decorative gable, with recessed wings on either side. A surviving original pub sign remains on the west side. The Music Room occupies an extension to the east and has its own entrances, while a second principal frontage on the west side provides access to the Oak Bar.

The original timber-framed windows survive throughout, many divided into small panes, and some retain shutters. All four entrances preserve their original glazed doors and fanlights, and several still have their original entrance lobbies.

=== Interior ===
The interior retains its original 1930s layout and a large proportion of its original fittings, joinery and decoration. The Oak Bar and Walnut Bar were designed in contrasting styles. The Oak Bar incorporates timber-effect beams, panelled walls, textured plaster finishes and fireplaces, and retains its original bar counter, back fitting, seating and glass-and-metal light fixtures. The Walnut Bar features walnut panelling, a classical fireplace, an original bar counter and back fitting with paired columns and surviving Art Deco detailing, together with moulded ceiling beams and columns.

The Music Room adjoins the Walnut Bar and is separated from it by folding glazed screens that allow the spaces to be opened or divided. It retains its stage, walnut panelling, coffered ceiling and a set of eight stained-glass windows depicting musical instruments.

Original lavatories survive in the Oak Bar, while those serving the Walnut Bar have been replaced. An accessible toilet has been added near one of the Music Room entrances.

The service and residential areas are more simply finished but retain many original features, including wood-block and quarry-tile floors, the main staircase, fireplaces in several upstairs rooms and bathrooms with cream-and-black tiled finishes.

== See also ==
- Grade II* listed buildings in the London Borough of Barking and Dagenham
- List of pubs in London
