= St Margaret's Church, Barking =

St Margaret's Church
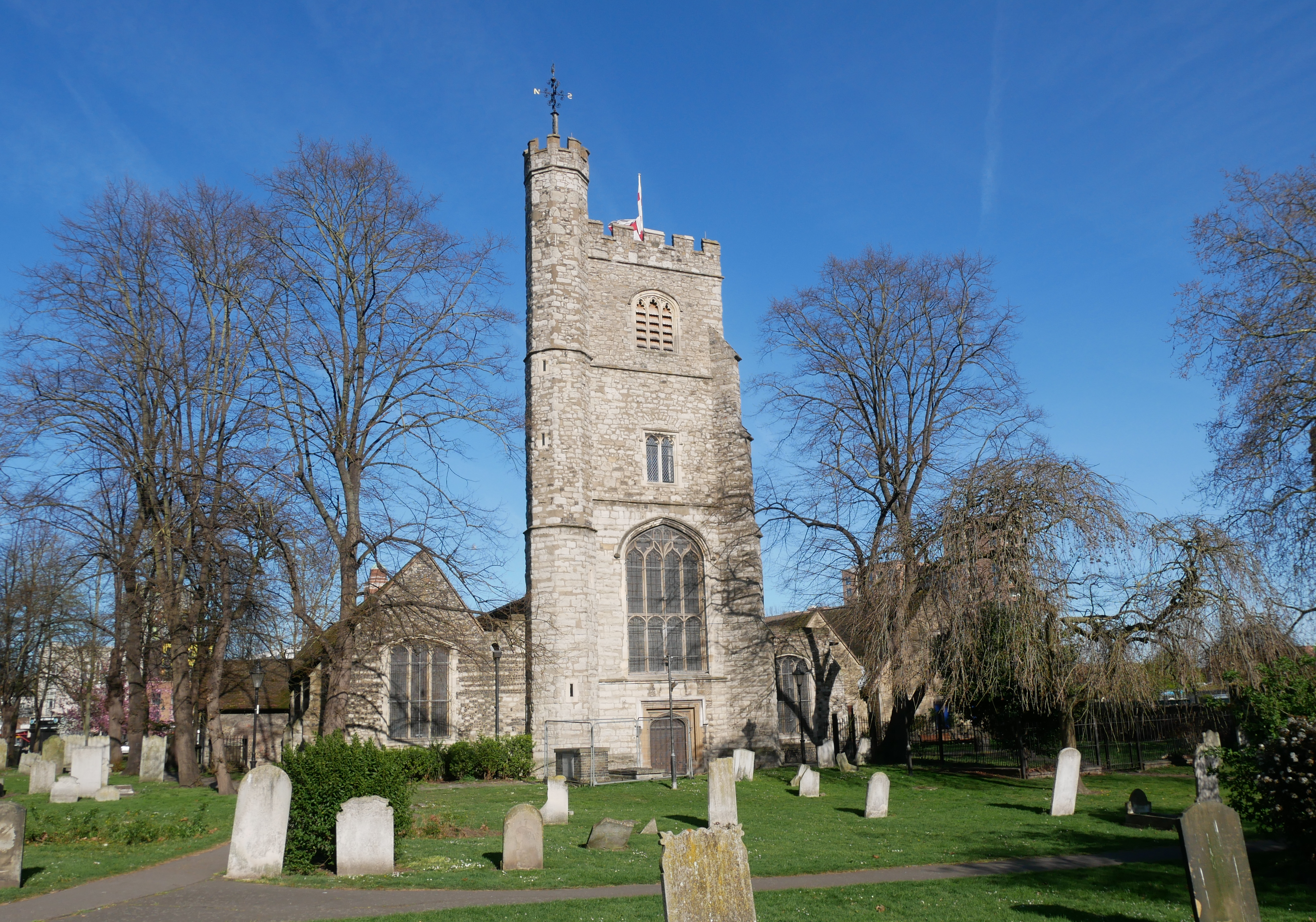
- West face of the church
- St Margaret's Church
- 51°32′7.89″N 0°4′33.6504″E
- OS grid reference: TQ 44065 83891
- Location: Barking, Barking and Dagenham
- Country: England
- Denomination: Church of England
- Churchmanship: Anglo-Catholic & open evangelical
- Website: Church website

History
- Status: Active
- Dedication: Margaret the Virgin
- Events: 1215: Foundation; 1762: Marriage of Captain James Cook to Elizabeth Batts

Architecture
- Functional status: Parish church
- Heritage designation: Grade I listed

Specifications
- Length: 134 feet (41 m)
- Width: 64 feet (20 m)
- Height: 75 feet (23 m)

Administration
- Province: Province of Canterbury
- Diocese: Diocese of Chelmsford
- Archdeaconry: Archdeaconry of Barking
- Deanery: Barking
- Parish: Barking

Clergy
- Rector: The Revd Mark Adams

St Margaret's Church or the Church of St Margaret of Antioch is a Church of England parish church in Barking, East London. The church is a Grade I listed building, on a site dating back to the 13th century, within the grounds of Barking Abbey, the ruins of a former Roman Catholic royal monastery originally established in the 7th century. The building is dedicated to Margaret the Virgin, also known as Margaret of Antioch.

== History ==
=== Medieval ===
The church originated as a chapel for local people within the grounds of Barking Abbey, to the south of the Abbey church. Its oldest part is the chancel, built early in the 13th century during the reign of King John. The building is said to have been made into a parish church in 1300 by Anne de Vere, abbess of the Abbey. Until the 1390s Barking formed a rectory, held by the Abbey and divided into two vicarages known as 'Northstrete' (probably funded by income from the Ilford area) and 'Southstrete' (serving the Abbey church). The area suffered severe flooding in the late 14th century, leading to financial difficulties and a merger of the two vicarages from 1398 onwards. A chaplain from the Abbey led worship. The present bell tower was added late in the 15th century.

=== Reformation ===
It remained a parish church when the Abbey was dissolved and the rectory and advowson devolved to the Crown, who initially leased it to the widow Mary Blackenhall for 21 years in 1540. In 1557 these were bought by Robert Thomas and Andrew Salter using money from the estate of William Pownsett of nearby Loxford, and granted to All Souls College, Oxford, in return for the vicar praying for the souls of Pownsett, his parents and benefactors every Sunday, giving 6 shillings and 8 pence amongst twenty poor people annually on the anniversary of Pownsett's death, paying the College an annual sum to maintain two poor scholars and only being absent from the parish 80 or fewer days a year. The College presented when the next vacancy occurred in 1560, but at the following one the Crown contested its right, though this was overturned via a lawsuit. Sir John Petre reconfirmed the 1557 grant in 1594, but dropped the requirement to pray for the dead. The right is now shared between All Souls College, Oxford, the Bishop of Chelmsford (in whose diocese it now falls) and the church's churchwardens.

=== 17th century to 20th century ===
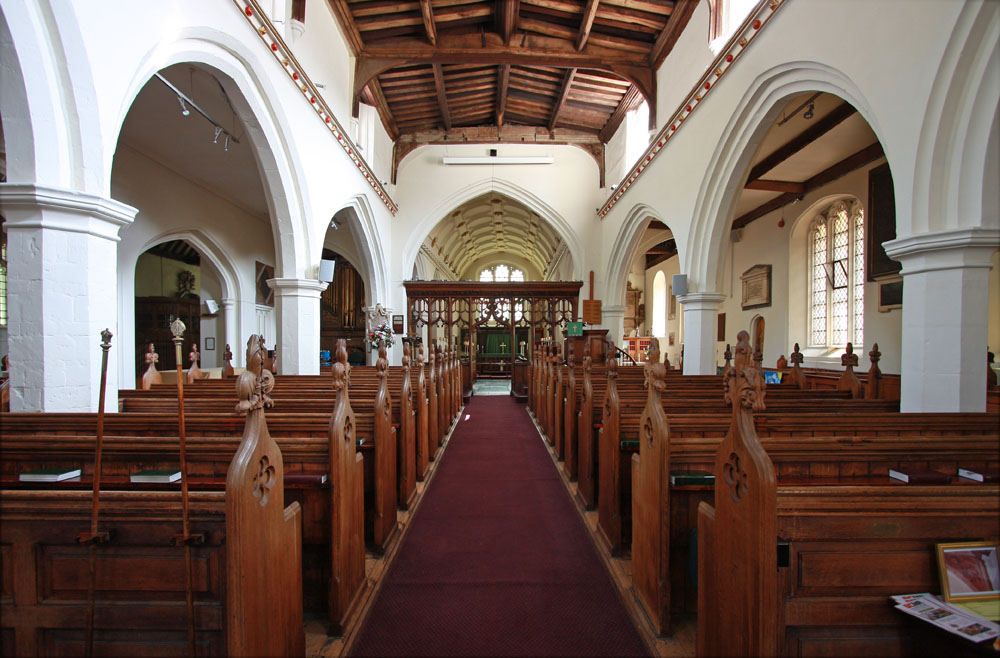
Interior

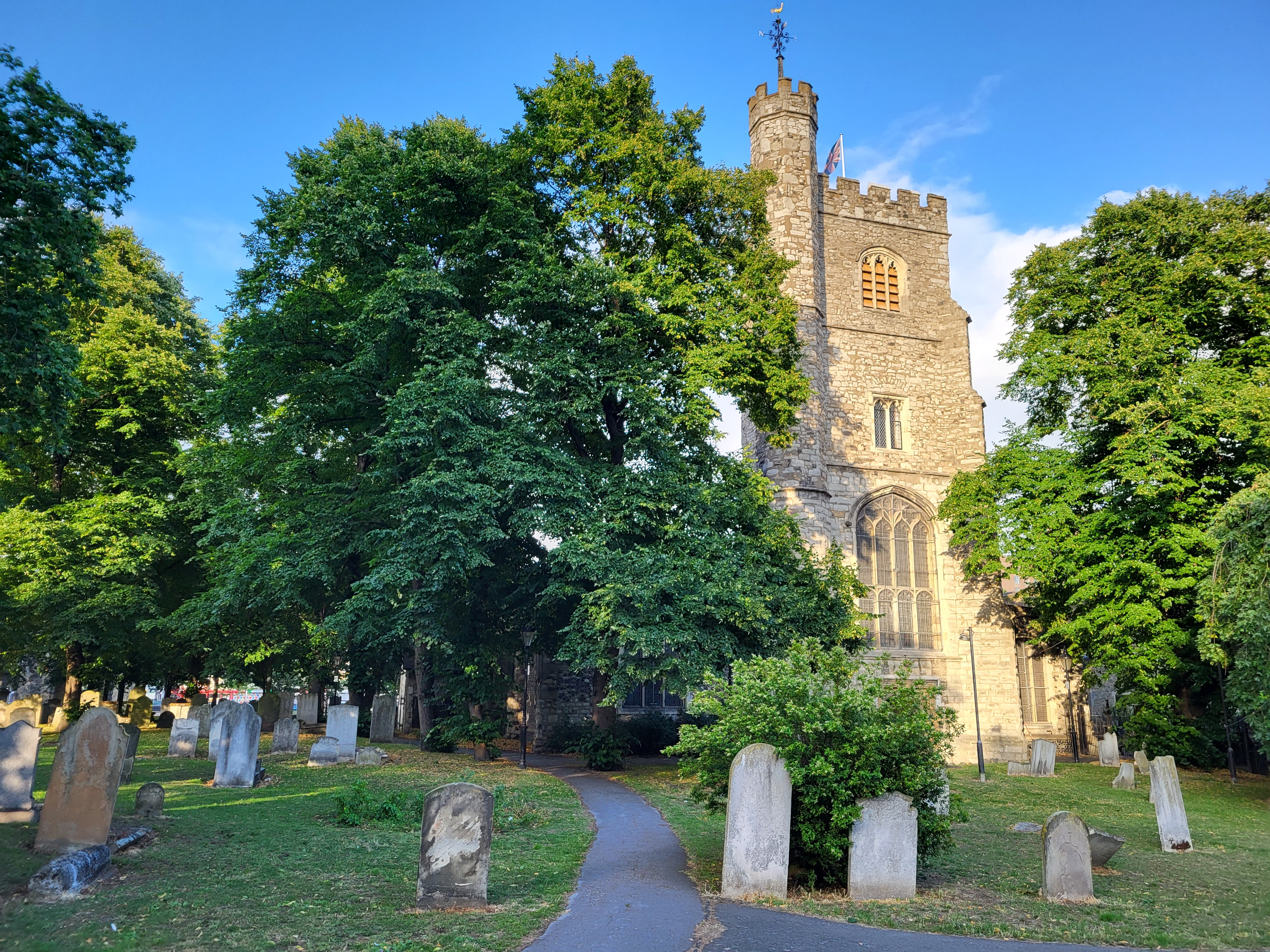
View of the church tower from the east

The church contains several memorials, including one to the 17th-century politician Charles Montagu. The explorer Captain James Cook married Elizabeth Batts in the church on 21 December 1762. Ten years later the nave, chancel and sanctuary all had their ceilings plastered, though this was removed from the nave ceiling in 1842.

Charles Winmill and George Jack were involved in a restoration of the interior between 1929 and 1936. The building was Grade I listed in 1954. An extension was added along the south side late in the 20th century to provide an office, bookshop and refectory.

== Present day ==
In the late 1970s (after vicar J W Roxburgh left in 1977) the parish became part of a team parish covering Barking with Christ Church and St Patrick's. On 1 January 2017, St Patrick's and Christchurch each gained their own parishes, taken from the team Parish area, leaving St Margaret's with a smaller Parish.

St Margaret's parish is unusual in having three churchwardens rather than two.

In 2007, two small stones from remains of the old medieval London Bridge were joined together in a sculpture in front of St Margaret's Church, facing the ruins of Barking Abbey, as part of several public artworks placed in Barking Town Centre by the artist Joost Van Santen.

The church is both Anglo-Catholic and open evangelical in tradition.

== Notable clergy ==
Many vicars of Barking have gone on to become bishops. Hugh Jermyn was Bishop of Colombo 1871–1875, Bishop of Brechin 1875–1903 and Primus of Scotland 1886–1901. Robin Smith, a curate from 1962, was Bishop of Hertford 1990–2001.

=== Vicars of North Barking ===
- 1315–????: Martinus
- 1328–????: ???? De Ansi
- 1335–????: ???? De Borton
- 1373–????: Hugo Smith
- 1385–????: Thomas Bene
- 1395–????: John Sacombe

=== Vicars of South Barking ===
- 1331–????: ??? De Cishampton
- 1335–????: ??? De Hochetote
- 1373–????: ??? ?Deautine/?Beautine

=== Vicars of Barking ===
- 1398–????: John Makewye
- 1403–????: Stephen Chamberlayne
- 1438–????: John Willoghby
- 1439–????: John Greening
- 1462–????: Robert Walesis
- 1486–????: Galf King
- 1505–????: John Frothingham
- 1511–????: John Long
- 1524–1560: John Gregyll
- 1560–????: Richard Tirwitt
- 1584–????: Edward Edworth
- 1587–????: Richard Wignall
- 1620–????: Richard Hall
- c. 1649–1653: William Amys
- until 1654: Jonathan Bowles
- until 1660: Benjamin Way
- 1660–1689: Thomas Cartwright; also Bishop of Chester from 1686.
- 1689–????: Leopold Finch
- 1697–????: John Chisenhale
- ????–????: Thomas Macken Fiddes
- ????–????: Lewis Owen
- ????–????: William Stephens
- before 1748: Peter Walkden
- 1748–????: Francis Morice
- 1751–????: Savage Tyndal
- 1782–????: Christopher Musgrave
- ????–????: Edmund Isham
- c. 1785: Peter Rashleigh
- 1836–????: Robert Lidell
- c. 1850 – ????: Henry Jeremiah Dyson
- c. 1860 – ????: Henry Fortescue Seymour
- 1870–1871: Hugh Willoughby Jermyn
- 1871–1882: Alfred Blomfield
- 1882–1888: John Richardson
- 1888–1895: Hensley Henson; later Bishop of Hereford and Bishop of Durham
- 1895–1903: Percy Montague Wathen
- 1904–?1915: John Warmington Eisdell
- 1925–1930: Leslie Hunter; later Bishop of Sheffield
- 1947–1959: William Chadwick; later Bishop of Barking
- 1959–1965: Denis Wakeling; later Bishop of Southwell
- 1965–1977: James Roxburgh; later Bishop of Barking
- Patrick Allen Blair
- Paul Richard Thomas
- John Parsons
- Gordon Tarry
- 2013–2019: Trevor Mwamba; previously Bishop of Botswana
- 2021 to date: Mark Adams

== Christenings, weddings and burials ==
=== Marriages ===
- At the church on 21 December 1762, the maritime explorer, cartographer and naval officer Captain James Cook married Elizabeth Batts. Her father, Samuel Batts, was keeper of the Bell Inn in Wapping and one of Cook's mentors.

=== Burials ===
- Daniel Day (1682–1767), founder of the Fairlop Fair, was buried in a coffin made from a bough which fell from the Fairlop Oak. Fairlop was, at that time, part of the ancient parish of Barking.
- Henry Fanshawe (1506–1568), a Member of the English Parliament during the reign of Elizabeth I. He also served as Queen's Remembrancer from 1565 until his death in 1568.
- Sir Charles Montagu (c.1564–1625) of Cranbrook Hall in the parish of Barking, Essex, a politician who sat in the House of Commons from 1614 to 1625. He was buried in the church where a mural monument survives, depicting a small effigy of Sir Charles fully armed, sitting in a military tent during a campaign. Its inscription reads:

Heere lieth the body of ye worthy knight S^{r} Charles Montagu who died at his house at Cranbrook in Essex in the parish of Barking the 11th of September in ye yeere of our Lorde God 1625 being of ye age of 61 yeares who gave to ye poore of Barking forty pounds
