= Eastbury Manor House =

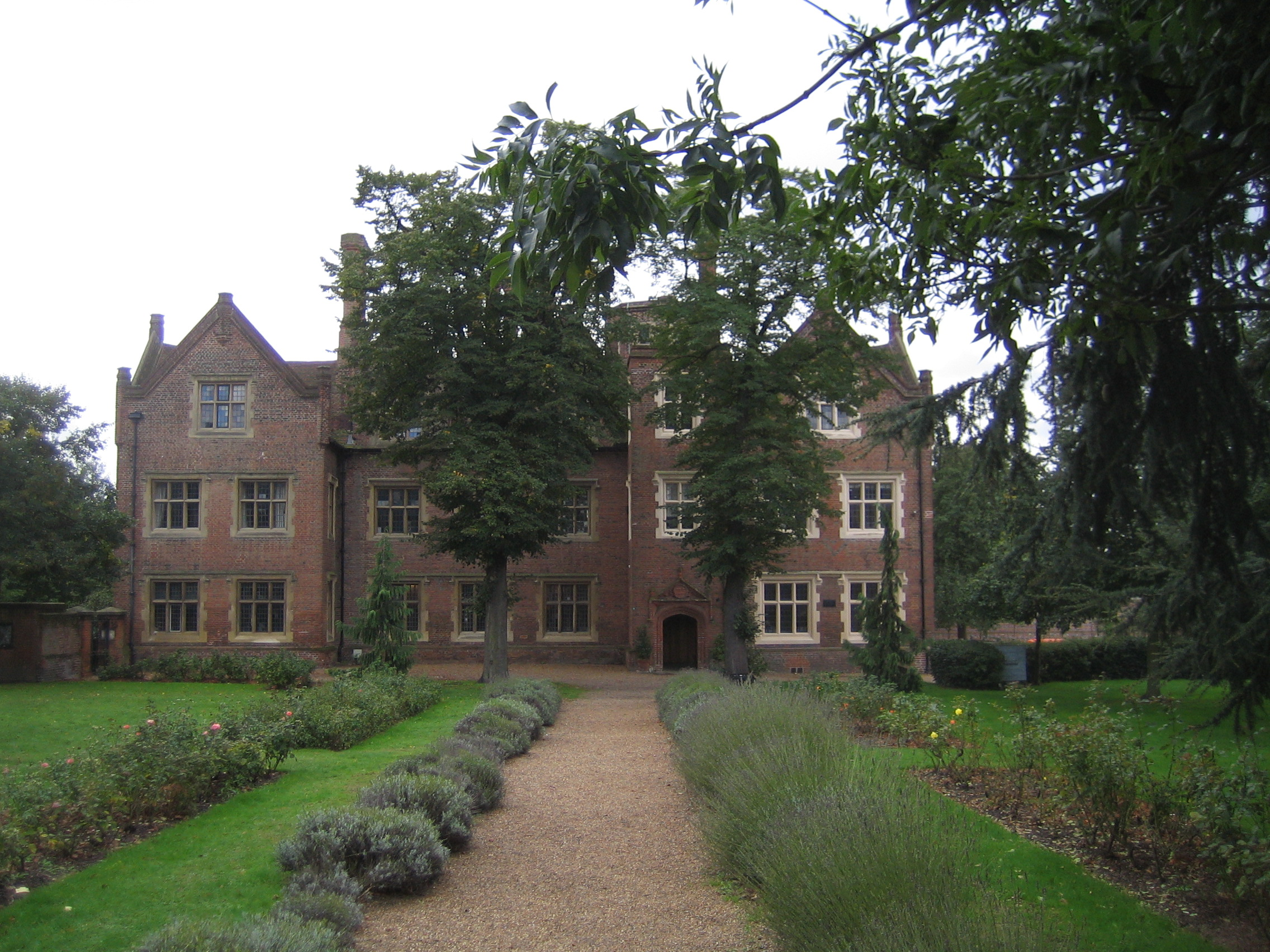
- Front view

- Location within Barking and Dagenham
- 51°32′3.5″N 0°5′58″E
- Type: Manor House
- Location: Eastbury Square, Barking, England
- OS grid reference: TQ 45709 83804

History
- Built: 1570s

Site notes
- Area: London Borough of Barking and Dagenham
- Architectural style: Elizabethan
- Governing body: London Borough of Barking and Dagenham
- Owner: National Trust

Listed Building – Grade I
- Official name: Eastbury Manor
- Designated: 28 May 1954
- Reference no.: 1359303

Eastbury Manor House is a Grade I listed building situated in the London Borough of Barking and Dagenham in Greater London, England. It dates to the Elizabethan period, although the land on which it was built was formerly part of the demesne of Barking Abbey. The house is owned by the National Trust but has been managed since the 1930s by the London Borough of Barking and Dagenham and its predecessors. It is open to the public for 10 months of every year.

== History ==
The land on which Eastbury House now stands was once part of the demesne of Barking Abbey. The house was built in the 1570s by Clement Sisley, a wealthy merchant, who purchased the land after the dissolution of Barking Abbey. It was probably the first brick-built building in the area at that time; it had glass windows and very high chimneys, indicating the wealth of the owner. Glass was probably imported from Italy as at that time English glass was relatively poor in quality. A dendrochronology survey dates the timber roof to 1566 and there is documentary evidence which describes the dates 1572 carved in the brickwork and 1573 on a lead water spout indicating finishing touches to the building.

Daniel Lysons, in his Environs of London, commented: "There is a tradition relating to this house, either, as some say, that the conspirators who concerted the Gunpowder Plot held their meetings there, or as others, that it was the residence of Lord Monteagle when he received the letter that led to its discovery"; both, perhaps, equally devoid of foundation.

The house fell into increasing dilapidation from the late 18th century. The Great Tower Staircase was demolished by 1814. Wooden flooring and original fireplaces were removed in the 1830s. By the late 19th century only the west wing of the house was habitable. In 1918 the house was bought by the National Trust and was restored. In 1931 it opened as the Museum of Barking. The house is managed by the London Borough of Barking and Dagenham.

The building was given Grade I listed status in 1954. In recent years it has benefited from a major restoration programme, financed through several successful Heritage Lottery Fund bids. The latest phase completed in 2010 includes a major permanent exhibition on the history of the building and its various owners.
