= Valence House Museum =

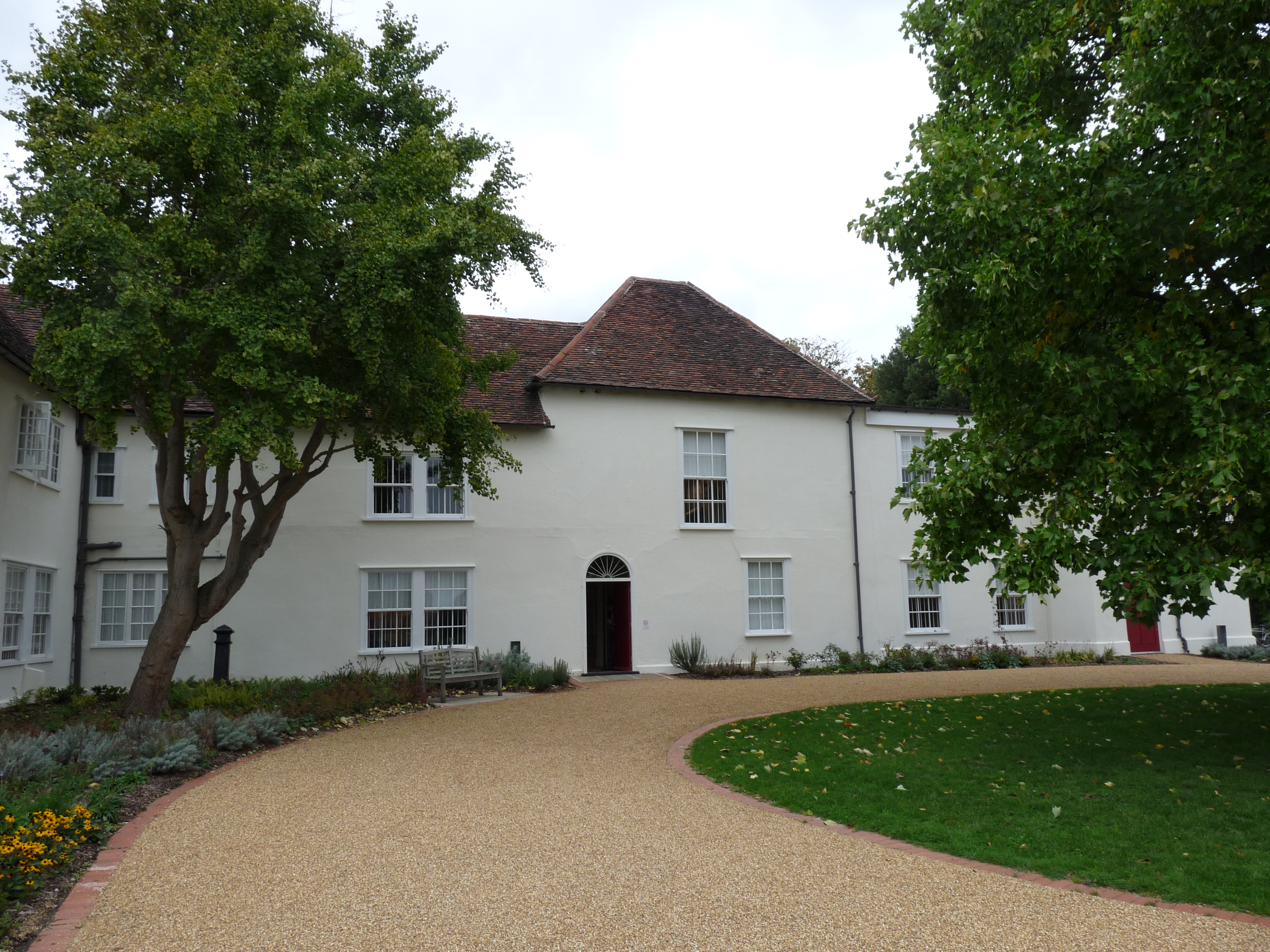
- Valence House Museum

- Location within Barking and Dagenham

General information
- Location: Becontree, London, England
- Coordinates: 51.5583°N 0.1342°E

Listed Building – Grade II*
- Official name: Valence House
- Designated: 28 June 1954
- Reference no.: 1064404

Valence House Museum is the only surviving of the five manor houses of Dagenham. The timber-framed museum building, partially surrounded by a moat built to keep livestock in place, is situated in Valence Park off Becontree Avenue, in the London Borough of Barking and Dagenham, London, England. The building has been used as a manor house, a family home, a town hall, the headquarters of the library service and now houses a museum.

== Valence House Museum ==
The museum contains permanent exhibitions on history and life in Barking and Dagenham, including displays from the 1945 Becontree Estate. It hosts regular special events for the public and school parties.

Valence House Museum, archives and local studies library closed on 22 December 2007 for a period of extensive refurbishment, partly funded by the Heritage Lottery Fund. It reopened in June 2010 and a few days later a plaque was unveiled to mark the funding. The refurbishment included a new purpose-built archive and local studies centre.

An exhibition opened at Valence House Museum on 14 March 2018, showing restored items from the Ray and Diana Harryhausen Foundation collection of film memorabilia, including models of creatures created by Harryhausen for stop motion model animation in films. The exhibition was inspired by local man Alan Friswell, who worked with Ray Harryhausen on the creature's restorations. It was funded by Barking and Dagenham London Borough Council.

== Valence Park ==
The surrounding park of 27.82 acres (0.11 km^{2}), has been created from the former Valence House estate, and was purchased by Dagenham Urban District Council from the London County Council in 1926.

The park hosts one of the Great Trees of London, a Holm oak.

== History ==
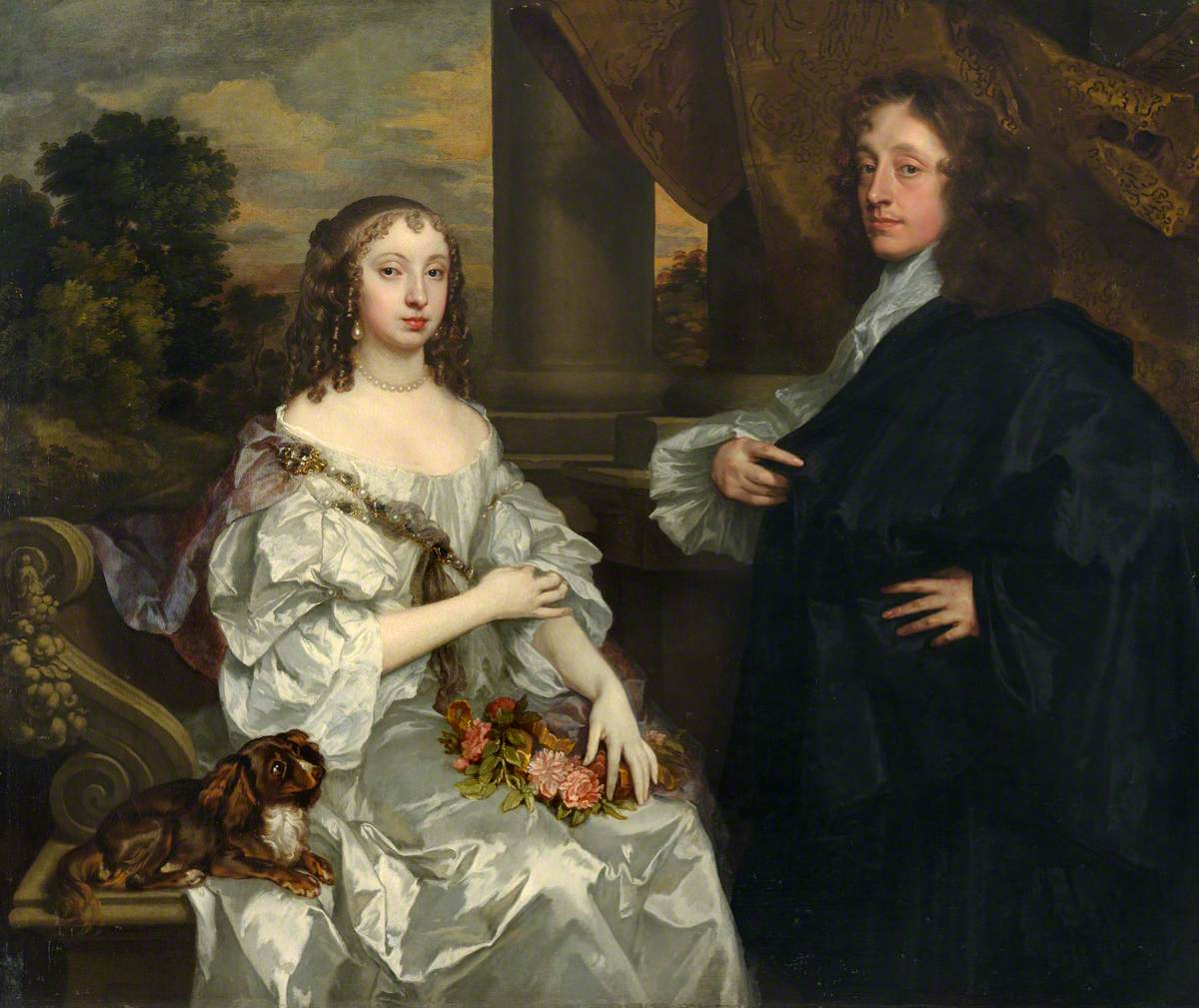
Portrait of Sir Thomas Fanshawe of Jenkins and his wife Margaret by the Anglo-Dutch painter Sir Peter Lely, 1659. The collection of Valence House Museum.

A house was first established on this site in the 13th century, owned by Robert Dynes in 1280. Later tenants of the estate are commemorated in the road names surrounding the park. The name of the house derives from 14th-century tenants, Agnes de Valence and her brother Aylmer, Earl of Pembroke, who came from a wealthy family in the French province of Valence, the family moving here when their uncle became king. The estate passed into the ownership of the Dean and Chapter of Windsor in 1475, and remained in their ownership until 1867, when it passed to the Church Commissioners. In the latter part of the 16th century the owner and tenant of Valence House was Timothy Lucye, who married in 1584 Susanna, daughter of Henry Fanshawe, of Jenkyns, an adjoining manor. He was the brother of Sir Thomas Lucy of Charlecote, Warwickshire.

=== Local government ===
In 1921, the London County Council (LCC) purchased the building and land to develop the Becontree estate. The house was used as the LCC headquarters during construction. The Dagenham Urban District Council acquired the premises. During 1928 and 1929 they extended to building for use as offices and the council chamber.

Valence House served as the town hall until 1937, when the Dagenham Civic Centre was completed. The house became the library headquarters of the borough. The house is now a museum, and houses the Borough Archives and Local Studies Library in a new building.

The building was Grade II* listed in 1954.

In February 2026 National Lottery Heritage Fund supported work began on repairing the moat.
