= Parks and open spaces in the London Borough of Barking and Dagenham =

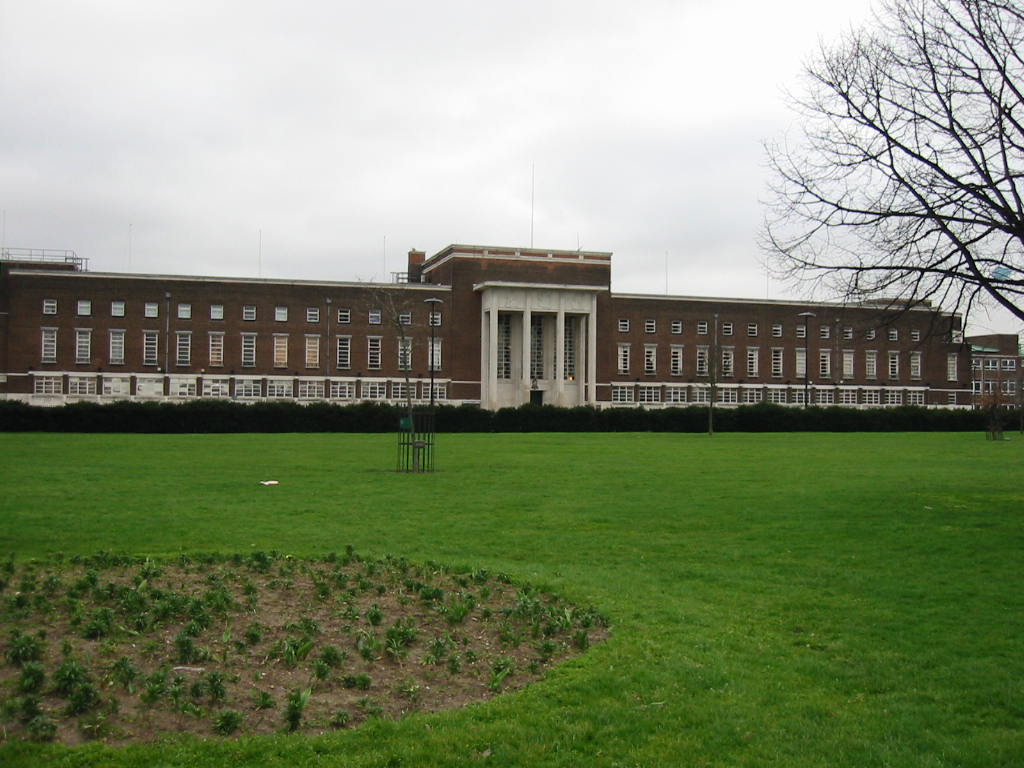
Dagenham Civic Centre is surrounded by landscaped open space.

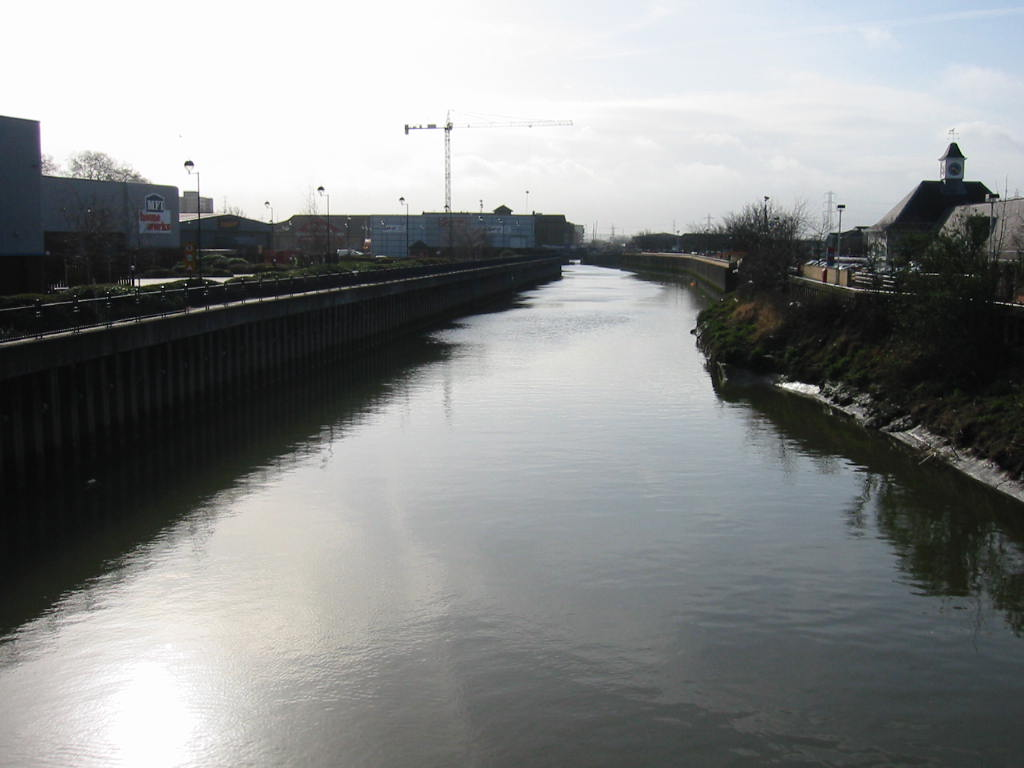
River Roding at Barking.

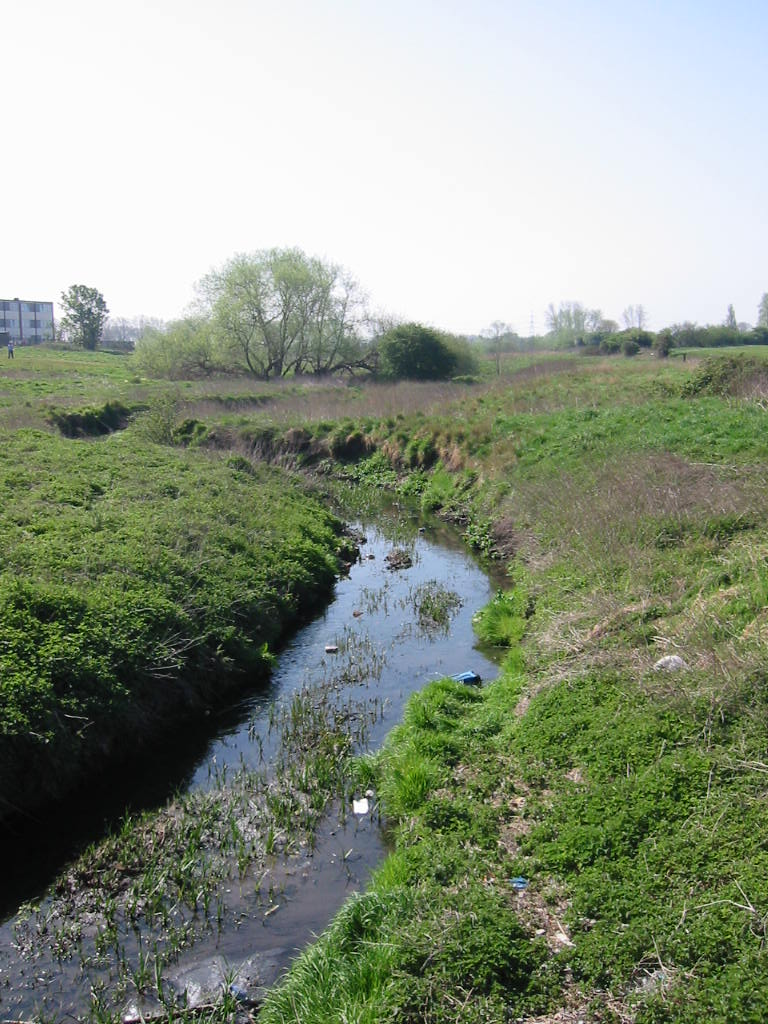
Beam Valley, Dagenham

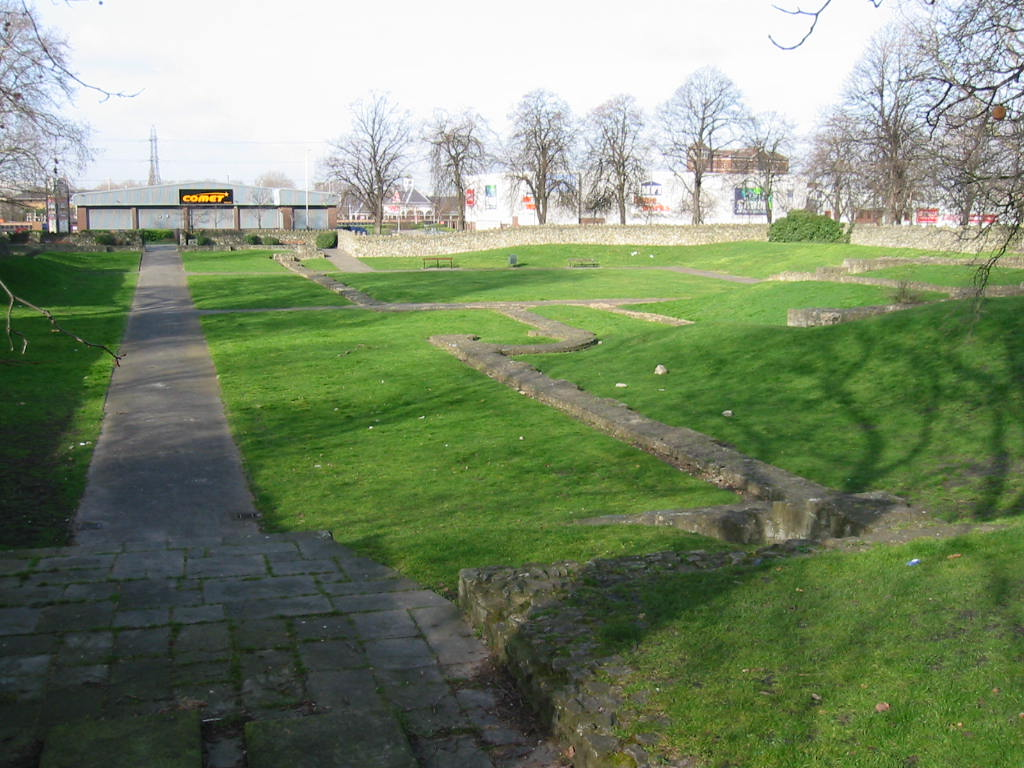
The ruins of Barking Abbey form an open space.

The London Borough of Barking and Dagenham, one of the outer London boroughs, has over 25 parks, gardens and open spaces within its boundaries. These provide the "green lungs" for leisure activities.

== Principal open spaces ==
Apart from smaller green areas such as sports grounds and smaller gardens, the following are the major open spaces in the Borough:

=== Barking ===
- Barking Park
- Greatfields Park
- Newlands Park
- Essex Road Gardens
- Central Area Open Space
- Quaker Gardens
- Barking Abbey Ruins
- Barking Town Quay Open Space
- St. Margaret's Churchyard

=== Dagenham ===
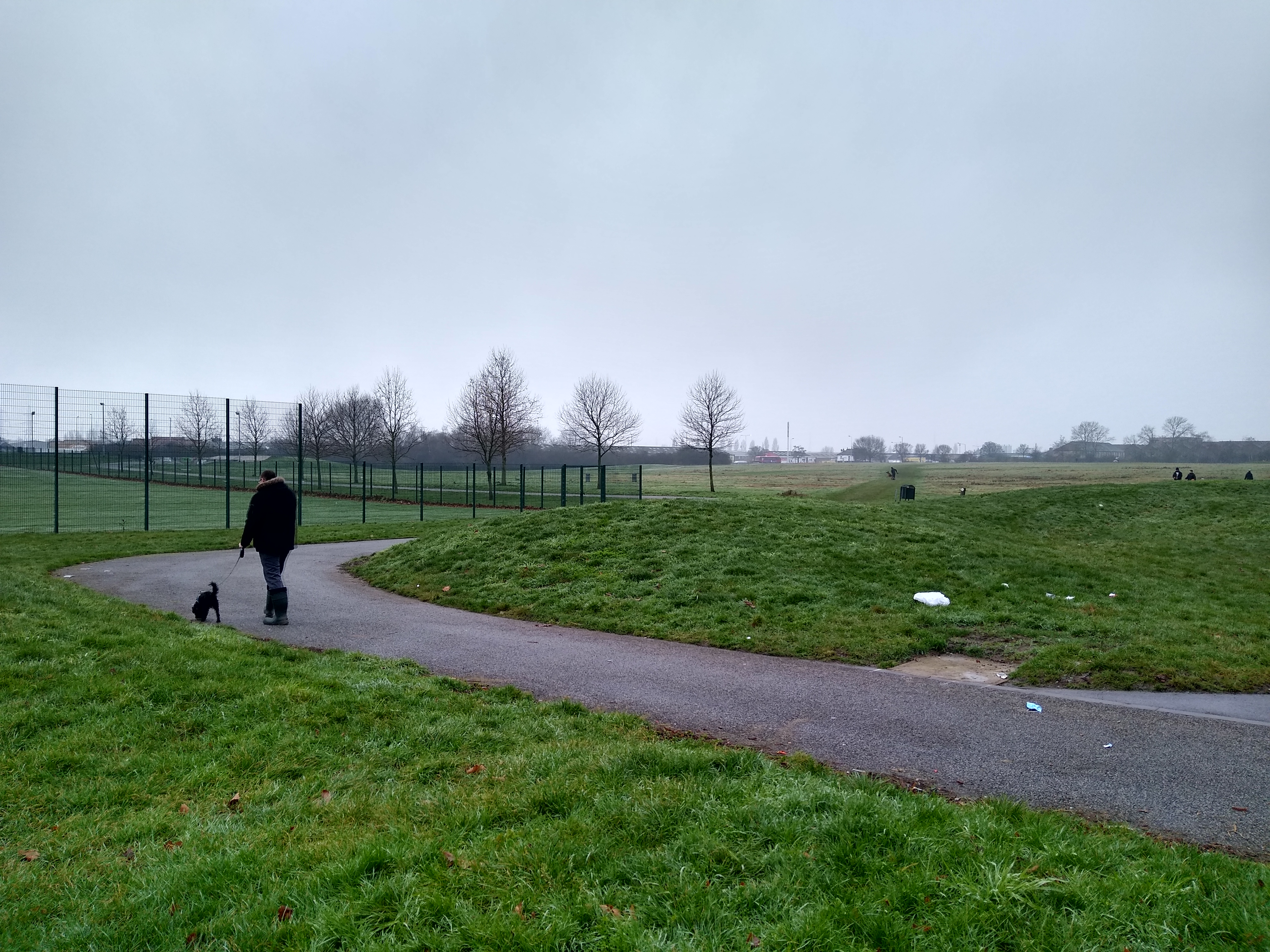
Castle Green

- Beam Central Park (also partly in Havering)
- Beam Parklands
- Central Park
- Valence Park and Valence House Grounds
- Parsloes Park
- Mayesbrook Park
- Pondfield Park
- Old Dagenham Park
- Castle Green
- Goresbrook Park
- Eastbrookend Country Park
- King George's Field
- The Leys

=== Chadwell Heath ===
- St. Chads Park
- Marks Gate Open Space (Also known as Tantony Green)

=== Marks Gate ===
- Marks Gate Open Space (Also known as Tantony Green)
- Kingston Hill Avenue Recreation Ground

Mayesbrook Park, in the borough is one of 11 parks throughout Greater London chosen to receive money for redevelopment by a public vote in 2009. The park received £400,000 towards better footpaths, more lighting, refurbished public toilets and new play areas for children.

== Water ==
The River Thames forms the southern edge of the borough. In many places there is a Thames Path, following the river, however views are problematic due to the high flood defences and industrial premises on the waterfront.

The River Roding forms the western boundary with the London Borough of Newham. This is accessible around the Town Quay area, Barking's former port.

== Local nature reserves ==
Local nature reserves in the borough are: Beam Valley Country Park, Dagenham Village Churchyard, Eastbrookend Country Park, Mayesbrook Park South, Parsloes Park Squatts, Ripple Nature Reserve, Scrattons Eco Park and The Chase Nature Reserve.
