= Public transport in the London Borough of Havering =

Public transport in the London Borough of Havering, in east London, England, is a mix of National Rail, London Underground, London Overground and Elizabeth line and London Buses services. Rail services are primarily radial to central London with bus services providing most of the orbital connections. The public transport authority is Transport for London and the local authority is Havering London Borough Council.

== Railways ==
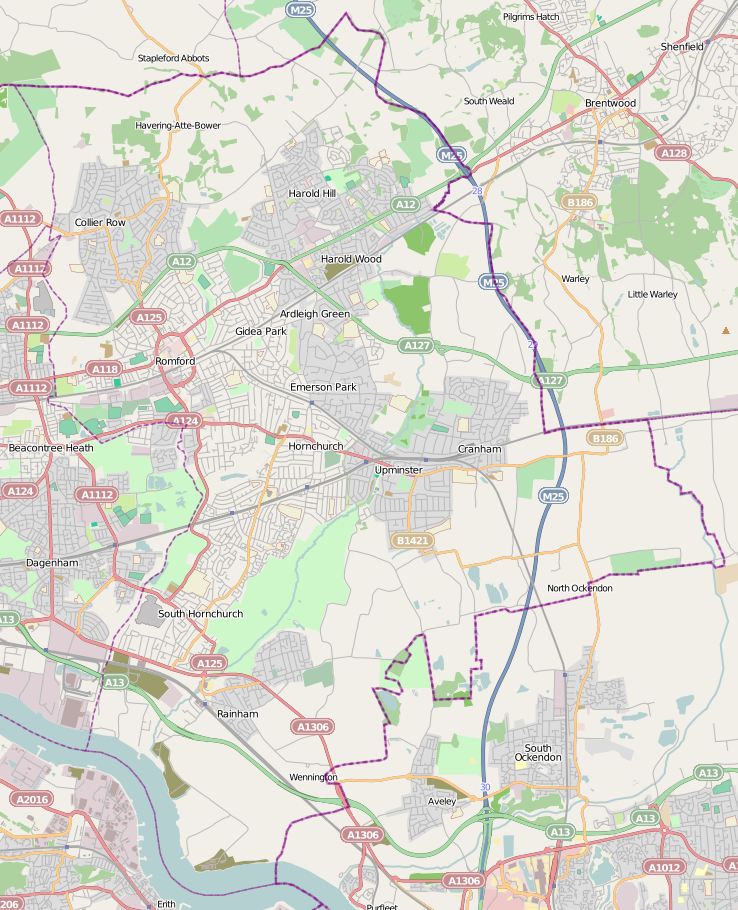
Stations: London Underground (red), National Rail (blue) and joint (green)

Several railway lines cross the borough running radial to central London. The Great Eastern Main Line has stations at Romford, Gidea Park and Harold Wood, with Elizabeth line stopping services and Greater Anglia non-stop services originating at the central London terminal at Liverpool Street. The London, Tilbury and Southend line, with services operated by c2c, crosses the borough in two places with stations at Rainham and Upminster, and splits into a further branch east of Upminster. The central London terminal for c2c services is at Fenchurch Street. The Romford to Upminster Line operated by London Overground is entirely contained within the borough and has one intermediate station at Emerson Park. The District line of the London Underground has stations at Elm Park, Hornchurch, Upminster and Upminster Bridge. All stations in Havering are in London fare zone 6.

Station	Manager	Category	Fare zone	Coordinates
Elm Park	London Underground	n/a	6	51.5497°N 0.1977°E
Emerson Park	London Overground	F	6	51.5687°N 0.2204°E
Gidea Park	Elizabeth line	C	6	51.5820°N 0.2063°E
Harold Wood	Elizabeth line	C	6	51.5928°N 0.2343°E
Hornchurch	London Underground	n/a	6	51.5530°N 0.2188°E
Rainham	c2c	C	6	51.5169°N 0.1905°E
Romford	Elizabeth line	C	6	51.5749°N 0.1827°E
Upminster	c2c	C	6	51.5588°N 0.2509°E
Upminster Bridge	London Underground	n/a	6	51.5580°N 0.2341°E

== Bus routes ==
There are two main radial bus routes in the borough—the 5 and 86—which connect Romford with the hubs of Stratford and Canning Town bus stations in the west of Newham. Both have corresponding night bus routes (the N15 and the N86) which are extensions of these routes (to Paddington and to Harold Hill respectively). Direct bus services to central London only operate at night. A large number of routes are entirely contained within the borough, with the majority acting as feeder services to the hub at Romford, although some routes serve smaller centres such as Hornchurch and Upminster. Route 66 provides a connection between Romford and stations on the Central line.

The neighbouring borough of Barking and Dagenham has high levels of connectivity with Havering, as does Redbridge. There are direct services to parts of Newham and Waltham Forest. There are no connecting services with the neighbouring borough of Bexley, as it is cut off by the Thames with no directly connecting bridges or tunnels. There are low frequency cross-boundary services with Brentwood, Epping Forest and Thurrock in Essex. Of these, the 370 and 372 both connect the borough with Lakeside Shopping Centre, while the 375 runs to Passingford Bridge, the 498 to Brentwood and the school-service 608 to the furthest east on the TfL network at Shenfield High School.

There are also a few non-TfL routes operating within Havering, either through passing by back into Essex or fully starting in Havering. These routes are the NIBS 269 which runs from Brentwood to Grays but passes through Havering in North Ockendon, the Z2 which passes through Beam Park and Rainham on its way to Amazon Tilbury and Canning Town, the 4 which is a college service running between Corbets Tey and Palmers College as well as the Veolia Shuttle running between Rainham Tesco and Veolias landfill site in Rainham.

== Walking ==
Havering is on the route of the London Outer Orbital Path, with sections 20 to 24 entirely or partly within the borough.

== Proposed developments ==
The south of the borough is within the London Riverside regeneration area, where demand for public transport is expected to rise. Havering London Borough Council supports the construction of a new station at Beam Reach, the extension of the East London Transit from Dagenham Dock to Rainham and the proposed Docklands Light Railway extension to Dagenham Dock. These aspirations are shared by the London Thames Gateway Development Corporation who are the planning authority in the designated area of the borough. Of these proposals only the extension of the DLR to Dagenham Dock forms part of the 2009 draft transport strategy of the Mayor of London.
