= London Riverside =

Redevelopment area in England, launched 1995

Coordinates: 51°31′N 0°7′E

The riverside at Barking with industrial uses in the background

The London Riverside is a redevelopment area on the north side of the River Thames in East London, England. The area was identified as a zone of change following the introduction of the Thames Gateway policy in 1995. Proposals for improvements in the area were at first developed by Havering and Barking and Dagenham councils, with a London Riverside Urban Strategy published in 2002. It was identified as an opportunity area for housing in the first London Plan published by the Mayor of London in 2004. Between 2004 and 2013 the planning powers in the area were the responsibility of the London Thames Gateway Development Corporation. The area includes existing town centres and large areas of brownfield land. As of May 2026, redevelopment is underway. Completed projects include the East London Transit bus service and the CEME education centre. Large-scale phased housing developments under construction include Beam Park, Dagenham Green and Barking Riverside. As of 2025, 8,087 new homes have been completed with 44,000 projected to be built over 22 years.

== Planning ==
London Riverside opportunity area identified in the London Plan

The potential for the southern sections of Barking and Dagenham and Havering adjacent to the Thames to be regenerated was identified in the Thames Gateway Planning Framework regional planning guidance published in 1995. The Barking/Havering Riverside area was identified as a zone of change that was named London Riverside. This was developed further by the London Riverside Action Group and in 2002 the London Riverside Urban Strategy proposed a number of regeneration and infrastructure improvements, including new stations on the Barking–Rainham railway line. London Riverside was listed as an opportunity area (Note: Opportunity areas are key locations that have the potential for large scale development, typically with capacity for at least 2,500 homes or 5,000 jobs, often linked to public transport improvements.) in the 2004 London Plan. In 2004 the London Thames Gateway Development Corporation took over planning functions from the local councils for the area, reverting to back to the councils in 2013. In 2015, the London Riverside opportunity area planning framework was adopted. (Note: Still current as of May 2026.) As part of the preparation of the next London Plan, a strategic analysis of the area was produced in 2025.

== Geography ==
It covers 2,500 hectares (6,200 acres). The area includes the established town centres of Barking and Rainham. It includes the riverside sections of Barking, Dagenham and Hornchurch where there are huge swathes of brownfield land. The southern parts of Rainham and Wennington contain less developed marshland.

== Projects ==
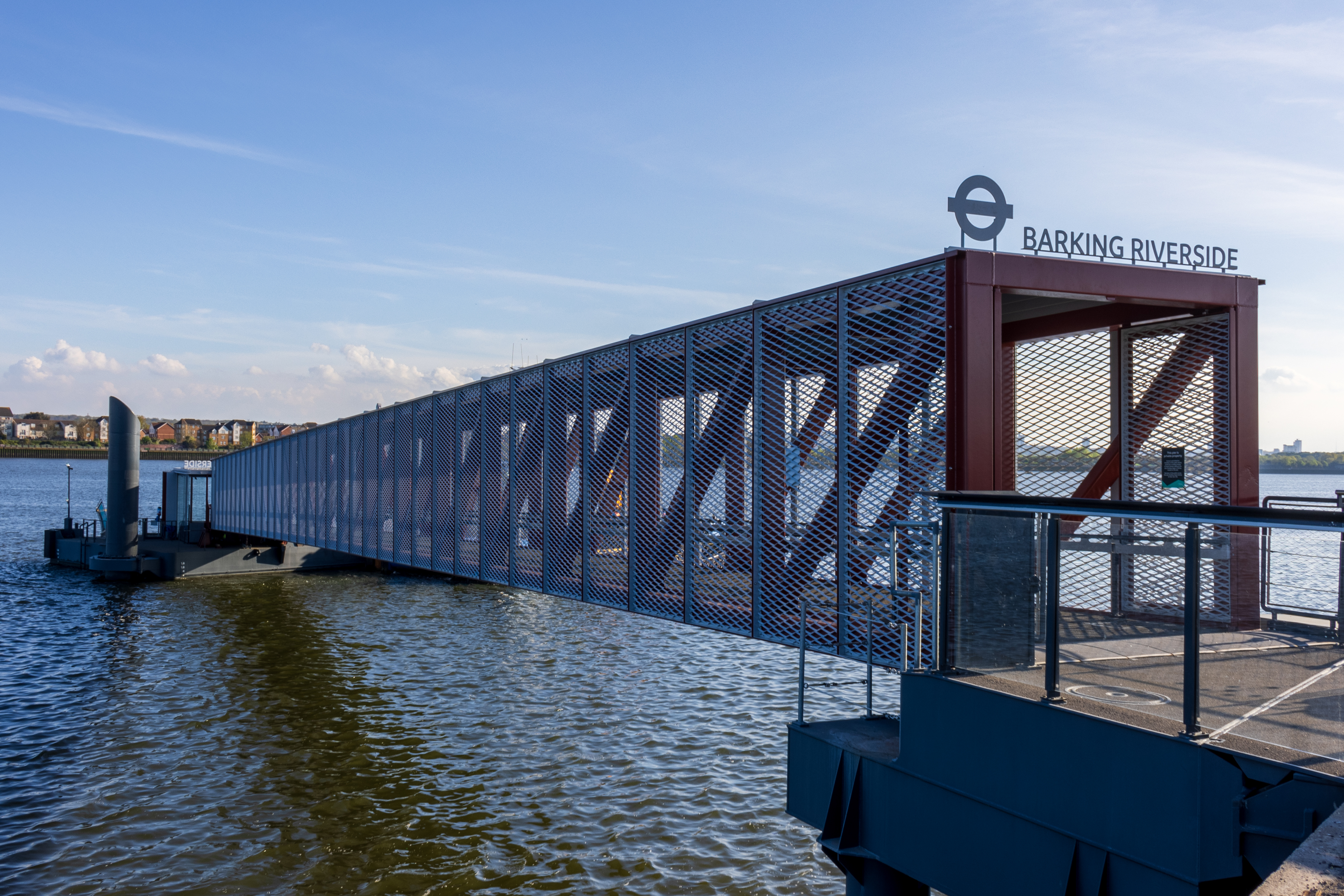
Barking Riverside Pier

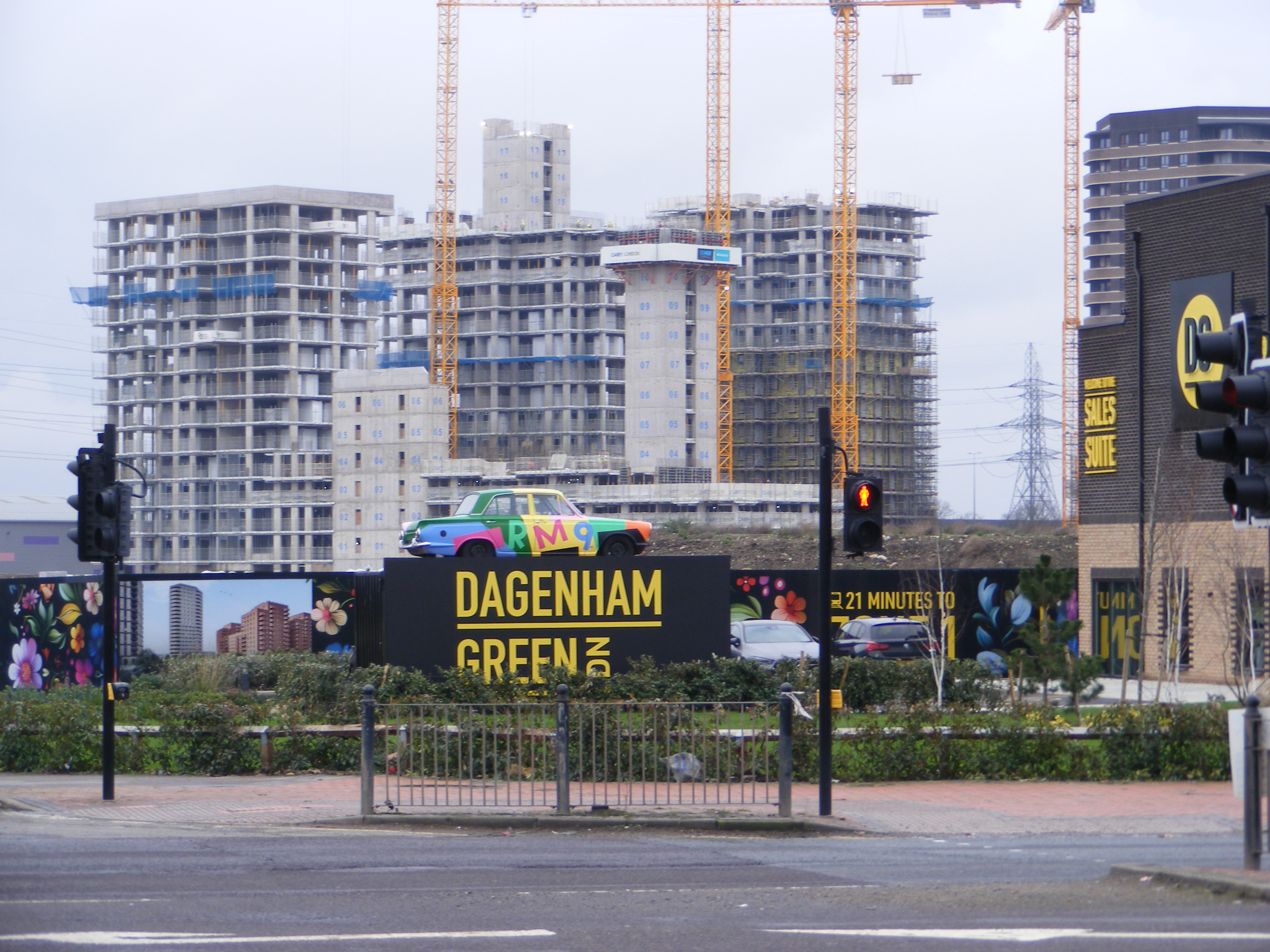
Dagenham Green under construction

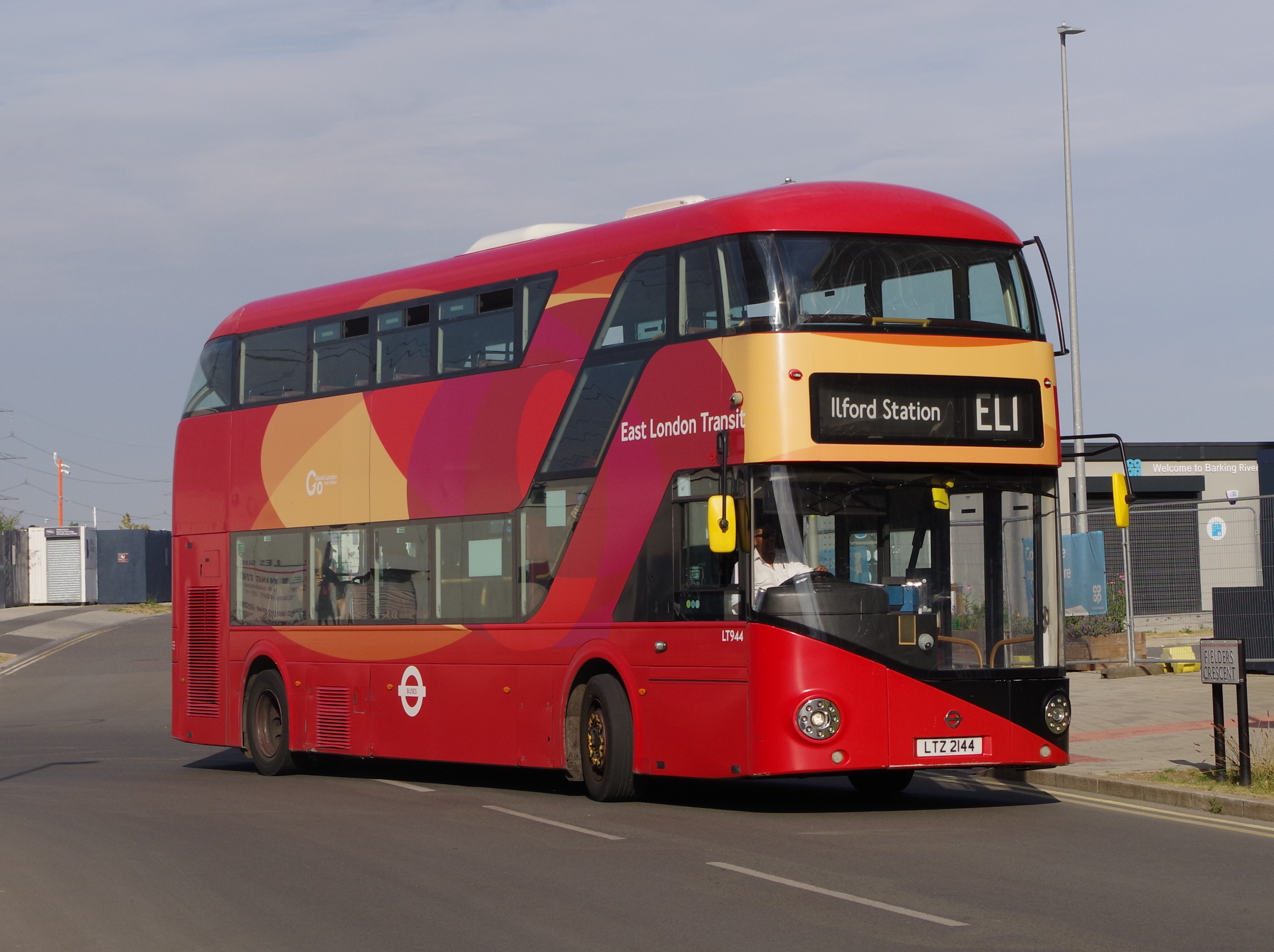
East London Transit bus

1,782 new homes were completed prior to 2019. As of 2025, 6,305 new homes have been completed since 2019 with 15,861 in advanced stages of planning. The area is categorised by the Greater London Authority as "ready to grow" and 44,000 new homes are projected to be built over 22 years from 2019.

Completed projects
- CEME, education and skills organisation in the Beam Reach manufacturing area, opened 2003
- Barking Riverside Pier, connection to the Thames Clippers boat service to central London, opened 2022
- East London Transit, a bus rapid transit connecting the area to Barking and Ilford, launched in 2010
- London Overground extension to Barking Riverside, opened 2022
- London Sustainable Industries Park, a 1.33 km^{2} environmentally sustainable business cluster at Dagenham Dock, opened 2008
- Orchard Village, housing redevelopment, completed 2014
- Rainham Marshes Nature Reserve, part of the Wildspace conservation, recreation and amenity zone, opened 2006
Projects started, but not completed, including phased developments
- Barking, town centre redevelopment
- Barking Riverside, 1.8 km^{2} new community with 10,800 homes in first phase and 20,000 total
- Barking station, refurbishment of booking hall
- Beam Park, a new neighbourhood of 3,000 homes spanning two boroughs
- Dagenham Green, new neighbourhood of 3,500 homes
- Superloop SL12 express bus service between Gants Hill and Rainham industrial area
Projects that are proposed, and not started
- A13 road, partially buried underground
- Beam Park railway station, new station
- Beam Parkway, redevelopment of part of New Road in South Hornchurch
- Castle Green railway station, new station
- Docklands Light Railway extension to Dagenham Dock, new line and stations
