= Castle Green =

Castle Green may refer to:

- Castle Green, London, a suburb in Barking
  - Castle Green railway station, a proposed station
- Castle Green, South Yorkshire, England; see List of United Kingdom locations: Car-Cd
- Castle Green, Surrey, England, a small settlement near Chobham
- Castle Park, Bristol, England, a public open space
- Castle Green, the second building in the Hotel Green complex in Pasadena, California

== See also ==
- Castle Green House, a listed building by Cardigan Castle, Wales
