= Beam Reach =

Redevelopment area in London, England

Coordinates: 51.5199°N 0.1688°E

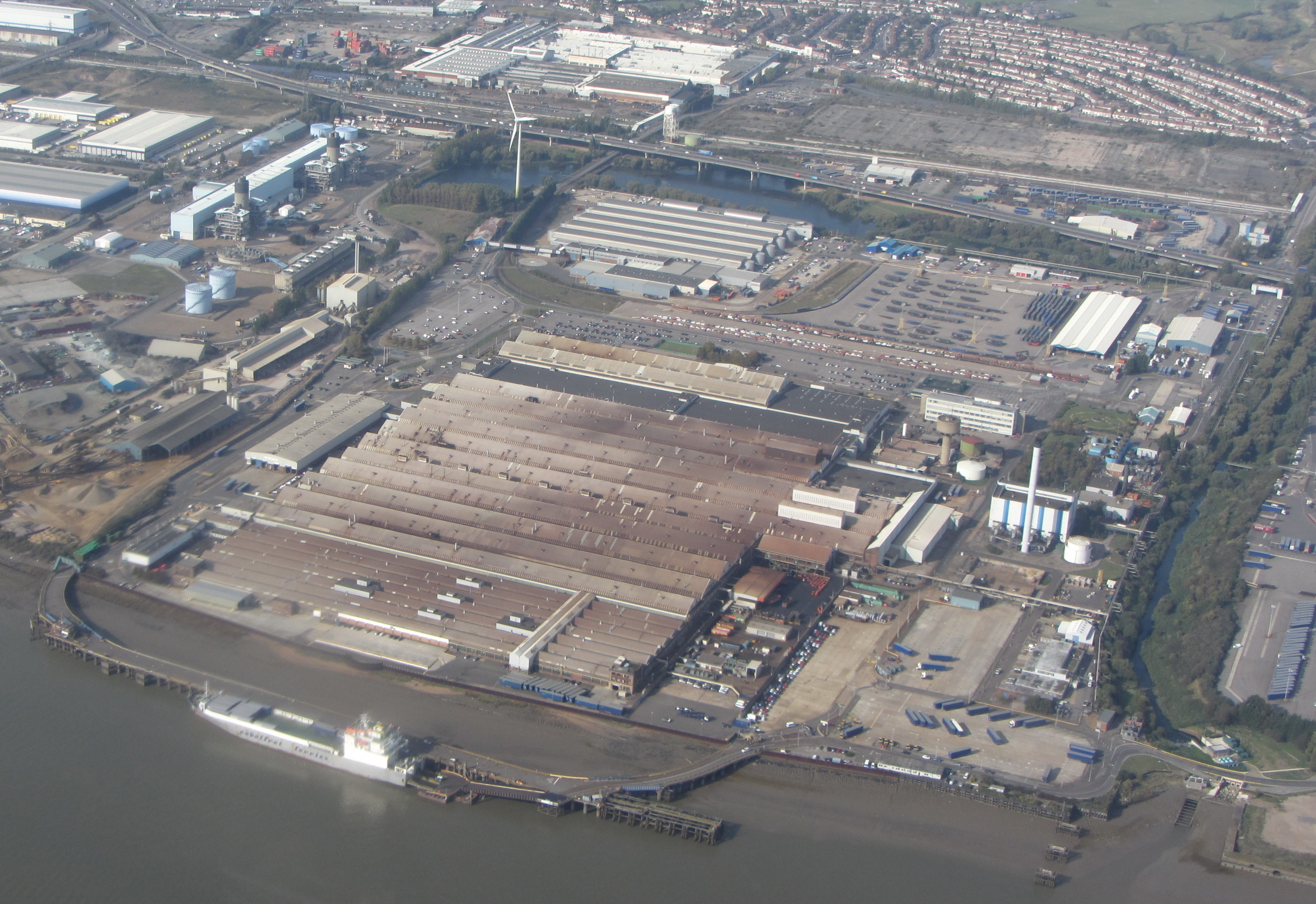
The Beam Reach development is planned for the bare site in the top right of this image, seen in 2011, just north of the Ford Dagenham plant

Beam Reach is a redevelopment area in London, England and part of the London Riverside section of the Thames Gateway. It is an industrial area adjacent to the new neighbourhood of Beam Park.

== Geography ==
It is located in the southern part of the London Borough of Havering, next to the River Thames and the River Beam. GLA Land and Property owns 40 hectares of land in the area and promotes it for intensification of manufacturing companies, to complement the nearby commercial and residential redevelopment areas, including Beam Park. Beam Reach is the location of Centre for Engineering and Manufacturing Excellence.

== Transport ==
The A1306 road forms the northern perimeter and the A13 road runs through the site east to west. Havering London Borough Council propose that Beam Park railway station should be built in the area, to be served by c2c trains.
