= Beam Park =

Neighbourhood in London, England

Coordinates: 51.524°N 0.1685°E

- Area
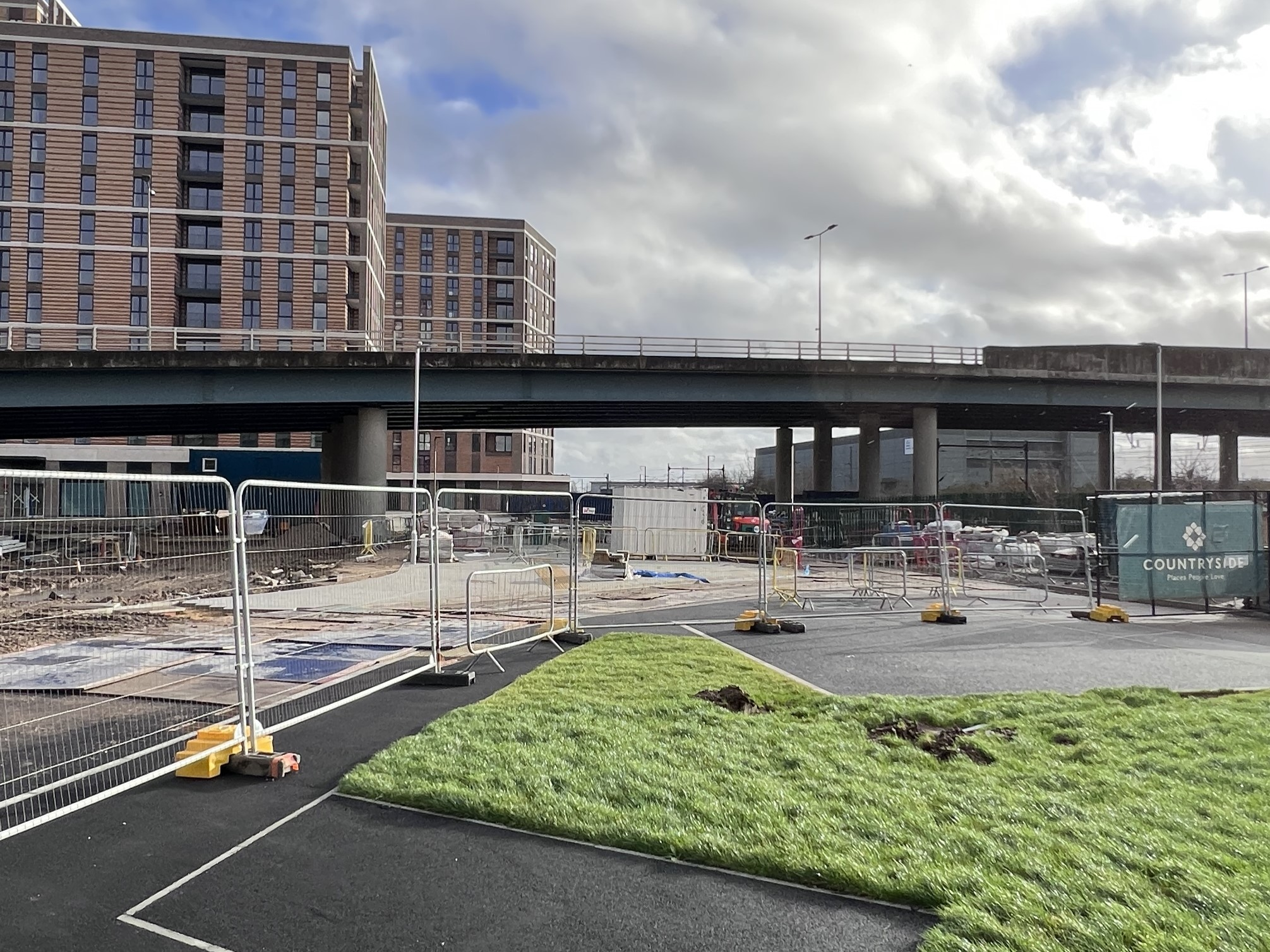
- Beam Park Station Square under construction

- Location within Greater London
- OS grid reference: TQ504821
  - Charing Cross: 12.6 mi (20.3 km) W
- London borough: Barking & Dagenham; Havering
- Ceremonial county: Greater London
- Region: London
- Country: England
- Sovereign state: United Kingdom
- Post town: DAGENHAM
- Postcode district: RM9
- Post town: RAINHAM
- Postcode district: RM13
- Dialling code: 020
- Police: Metropolitan
- Fire: London
- Ambulance: London
- UK Parliament: Dagenham and Rainham
- London Assembly: City and East; Havering and Redbridge

Beam Park is a new neighbourhood in the south of the London Borough of Barking and Dagenham and the London Borough of Havering. It is named after the River Beam which forms the boundary between the boroughs. It is part of the London Riverside opportunity area and is designated with neighbouring Rainham as a housing zone by the Greater London Authority. It covers an area of 29 hectares (71.7 acres). It will include a town centre in the Havering part of the development and will be served by Beam Park railway station. Much of the land previously part of the Ford Dagenham site is being redeveloped as a joint venture between London and Quadrant and Countryside Properties. Planning consent for 3,000 homes was issued in February 2019 and construction began in May 2019. The first residents moved into Beam Park in December 2020. Planning permission was given for 947 additional homes in December 2022

== History ==
The area was part of the riverside marshes of the parishes of Dagenham and Hornchurch.

The potential for the riverside areas of Barking and Dagenham and Havering to be regenerated was identified in the Thames Gateway Planning Framework published in 1995. The Barking/Havering Riverside area was identified as a zone of change that was named London Riverside. This was developed further by the London Riverside Action Group and in 2002 the London Riverside Urban Strategy proposed a number of regeneration and infrastructure improvements, including the building of Beam Park railway station.

The London Riverside was listed as an opportunity area in the 2004 London Plan and "Rainham and Beam Park" was designated as a housing zone by the Greater London Authority in 2014.

Much of the land used for Beam Park was part of the Ford Dagenham plant. From May 2012 the site, by then cleared of the vacant Ford buildings, was used as a secretive rehearsal site for the London 2012 Olympic opening and closing ceremonies. Two areas were marked out to the same scale as the stadium so two sections could be rehearsed at the same time, with a big tent erected as a base of operations for the production team and the hundreds of volunteer performers.

Development proposals for the site and surrounding land were published in 2017. Initially 2,899 homes were proposed, with 2,166 in Barking and Dagenham and 733 in Havering. This was increased to 3,000 in August 2018. Planning consent was issued on 7 February 2019 and construction began in May 2019. The first residents moved into Beam Park in December 2020.

Planning for the opening of Beam Park station had reached an advanced stage by October 2021 when the Department for Transport claimed there was never any government support for the station, and it would not authorise the commencement of passenger services.

In 2019 Havering Council decided to compulsory purchase land around New Road for redevelopment from light industrial to 880 further homes, in partnership with Notting Hill Genesis. In December 2021 the council withdrew the compulsory purchase order, because of uncertainty about the delivery of Beam Park station and the loss of £5 million in funding from Transport for London for the Beam Parkway scheme following the COVID-19 pandemic.

In March 2022 Barking and Dagenham Council purchased 936 unbuilt homes at Beam Park.

Barking and Dagenham Council gave planning permission for 947 additional homes in December 2022. The planning consent includes financial contributions for improved bus services, a walking route to Dagenham Dock railway station through the adjacent Dagenham Green development and improvements to the station.

== Governance ==
A new electoral ward called Beam Park, electing two councillors, was created for the 2022 election to Havering Council and another called Beam, electing three councillors, was created for the 2022 election to Barking and Dagenham Council.

== Transport ==
Transport for London plan to relocate the terminus of bus routes 165 and 365 to Beam Park station.

== Geography ==
Beam Park extends from the London Borough of Barking and Dagenham in the west to the London Borough of Havering in the east. The River Beam is the boundary between the boroughs and will become the central feature of the Beam Central Park. The Beam Parklands and Beam Valley Country Park are located to the north. Beam Reach is an industrial area to the south. It covers an area of 29 hectares (71.7 acres). It will include a town centre in the Havering part of the development, centred on the new railway station.
