= Julia Jarman =

Julia Jarman (born 28 March 1946) is a British author of books for children of all reading ages and ability.

== Background ==
Julia Jarman was born Julia Hudspeth in Deeping St James near the city of Peterborough in the UK, and now lives in Riseley, Bedfordshire. She studied English and drama at Manchester University and then qualified as a teacher. Her first book, When Poppy Ran Away, was published in 1985. She had three children all born in the early 1970s who have influenced her writing. After her youngest daughter, Mary, gave birth to her first grandson, Theo (born 10 June 2001), she started to write picture books for infants. Her first picture book was Big Red Bath (2004). Mary had two more children after Theo called Maya (born 30 September 2003) and Lois (born 12 December 2005), which made her write more picture books including Big Blue Train, Big Yellow Digger, Class Two at the Zoo, Class Three All at Sea and Ants in Your Pants.

Big Red Bath became a successful stage show in 2013. Directed by Chris Elwell of Half Moon Young People's Theatre in Limehouse, East London, it is a co-production with Full House Theatre of Bedford. The French alternative indie-electro-pop-trio We Are Evergreen created the music. The group toured the UK in 2014, following a week-long run at Half Moon beginning 31 January.

== Partial bibliography ==
- When Poppy Ran Away (1985)
- Ollie and the Bogle (1987)
- Poppy and the Vicarage Ghost (1989)
- The Ghost of Tantony Pig (1990)
- Georgie and the Dragon (1991)
- Nancy Pocket and the Kidnappers (1991)
- Topher and the Time Travelling Cat (1992) later published as The Time-Travelling Cat And The Egyptian Goddess (2006)
- Georgie and the Planet Raider (1993)
- Squonk (1993)
- Georgie and the Computer Bugs (1995)
- The Crow Haunting (1996)
- A Test For the Time Travelling Cat (1997) later published as The Time-Travelling Cat and the Tudor Treasure (1997)
- The Haunting of Nadia (1998) later published as Jenny Greenteeth by A & C Black in (2012)
- Hangman (1999)
- The Time Travelling Cat and the Roman Eagle (2001)
- The Magic Backpack (2001)
- Peace Weavers (2004)
- Big Red Bath (2004)
- The Jessame Stories (2005)
- The Time-Travelling Cat and the Aztec Sacrifice (2006)
- Grandma's Seaside Bloomers (2007)
- Big Blue Train (2007)
- The Time-Travelling Cat and the Viking Terror (2008)
- Ghost Writer (2008)
- Henry VIII Has To Choose (2009)
- The Time-Travelling Cat and the Great Victorian Stink (2010)
- Big Yellow Digger (2011)
- A Friend in Need (2013)

Three of her novels, Hangman, Peace Weavers and Ghost Writer, have been nominated for the Carnegie medal. She won the Stockport Schools Book Award three times, for Big Red Bath, Class Two at the Zoo and Ghost Writer, and has been shortlisted for several other prizes.
