= Dagenham Green =

Coordinates: 51.527994°N 0.150262°E

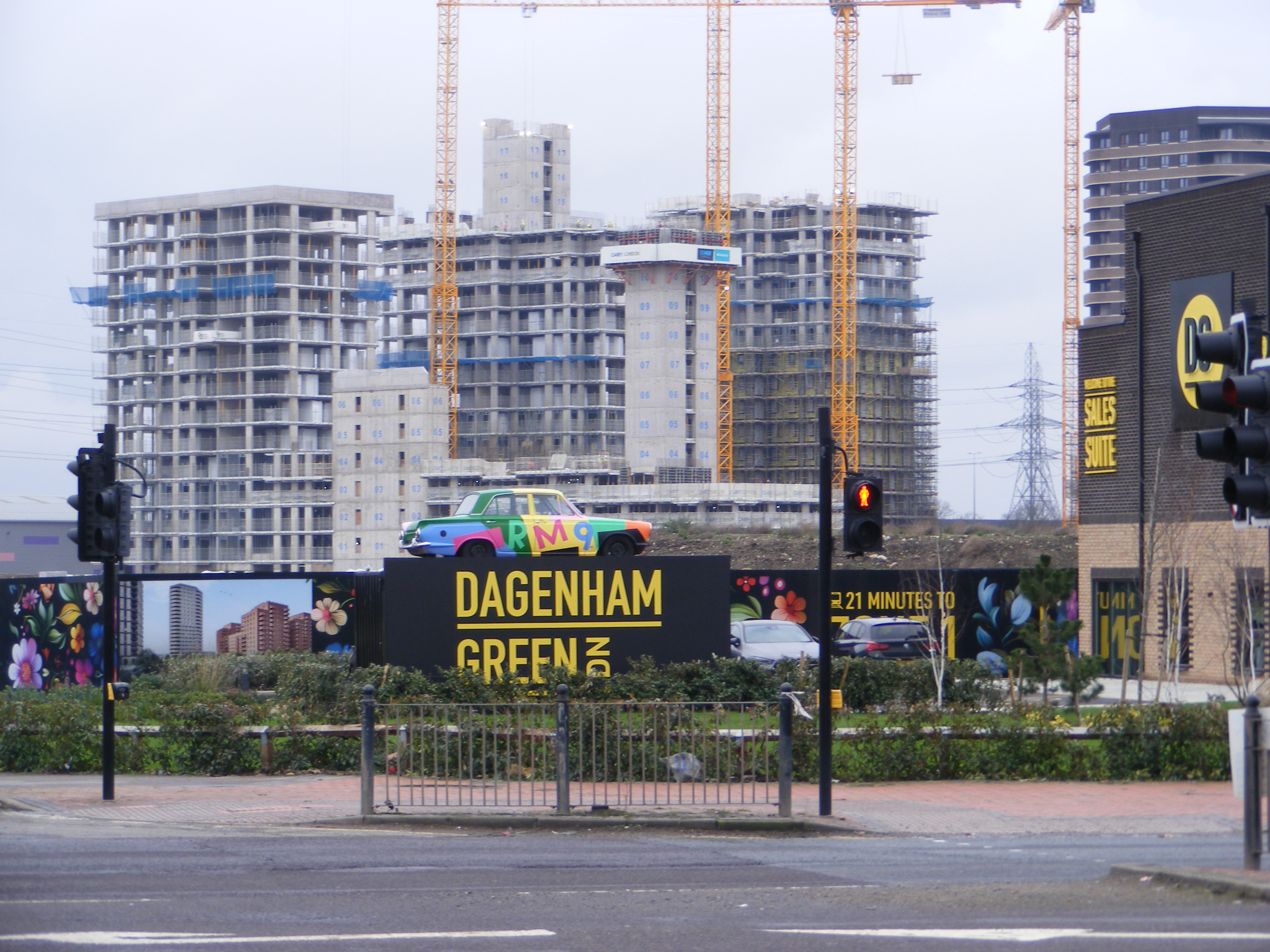
- Under construction

- Location within Greater London
- Interactive map of Dagenham Green
- London borough: Barking & Dagenham
- Ceremonial county: Greater London
- Region: London
- Country: England
- Sovereign state: United Kingdom
- Post town: DAGENHAM
- Postcode district: RM9
- Dialling code: 020
- Police: Metropolitan
- Fire: London
- Ambulance: London
- UK Parliament: Dagenham and Rainham
- London Assembly: City and East

Dagenham Green is a new neighbourhood, currently under construction, in London, England. Building work commenced in November 2022 with the first homes completed in February 2026. It is located to the northeast of Dagenham Dock railway station.

== History ==
The potential for the riverside areas of the London Borough of Barking and Dagenham to be regenerated was identified in the Thames Gateway Planning Framework published in 1995. South Dagenham and Dagenham Dock were included in a zone of change called London Riverside. The area was listed as an opportunity area in the 2004 London Plan.

In 2021, the 45-acre site of the former Ford Dagenham stamping plant was sold by Europa Capital to Peabody. Planning consent was granted in March 2022 for a 3,500-home development. Building work commenced in November 2022. The first homes were completed in February 2026. The first of three residential towers was topped out in May 2026.

== Governance ==
Dagenham Green is in the Beam ward of Barking and Dagenham, electing three councillors to Barking and Dagenham London Borough Council. For London Assembly elections, it is in the City and East constituency. For elections to the UK parliament, it is in the Dagenham and Rainham constituency.

== Geography ==
It is contained within the area bounded by New Road to the north, Kent Avenue to the east, the London, Tilbury and Southend line to the south and Chequers Lane to the west. Beam Park, another new neighbourhood also under construction, is to the east of Dagenham Green.

== Transport ==
Dagenham Green is located to the northeast of Dagenham Dock railway station. The area is served by London Buses routes along New Road and Chequers Lane. The East London Transit bus service has a terminus at Dagenham Dock.
