= Ardleigh Green =

Area of East London, England

Coordinates: 51.5833°N 0.2165°E

- Suburb
- Location within Greater London
- OS grid reference: TQ535895
  - Charing Cross: 15.5 mi (24.9 km) WSW
- London borough: Havering
- Ceremonial county: Greater London
- Region: London
- Country: England
- Sovereign state: United Kingdom
- Post town: HORNCHURCH
- Postcode district: RM11
- Dialling code: 01708
- Police: Metropolitan
- Fire: London
- Ambulance: London
- UK Parliament: Hornchurch and Upminster
- London Assembly: Havering and Redbridge

Ardleigh Green /ˈɑːrdli/ is an area in east London, England, within the London Borough of Havering. It is 15.5 miles (25 km) east-northeast of Charing Cross. This part of London is predominantly residential.

== History ==
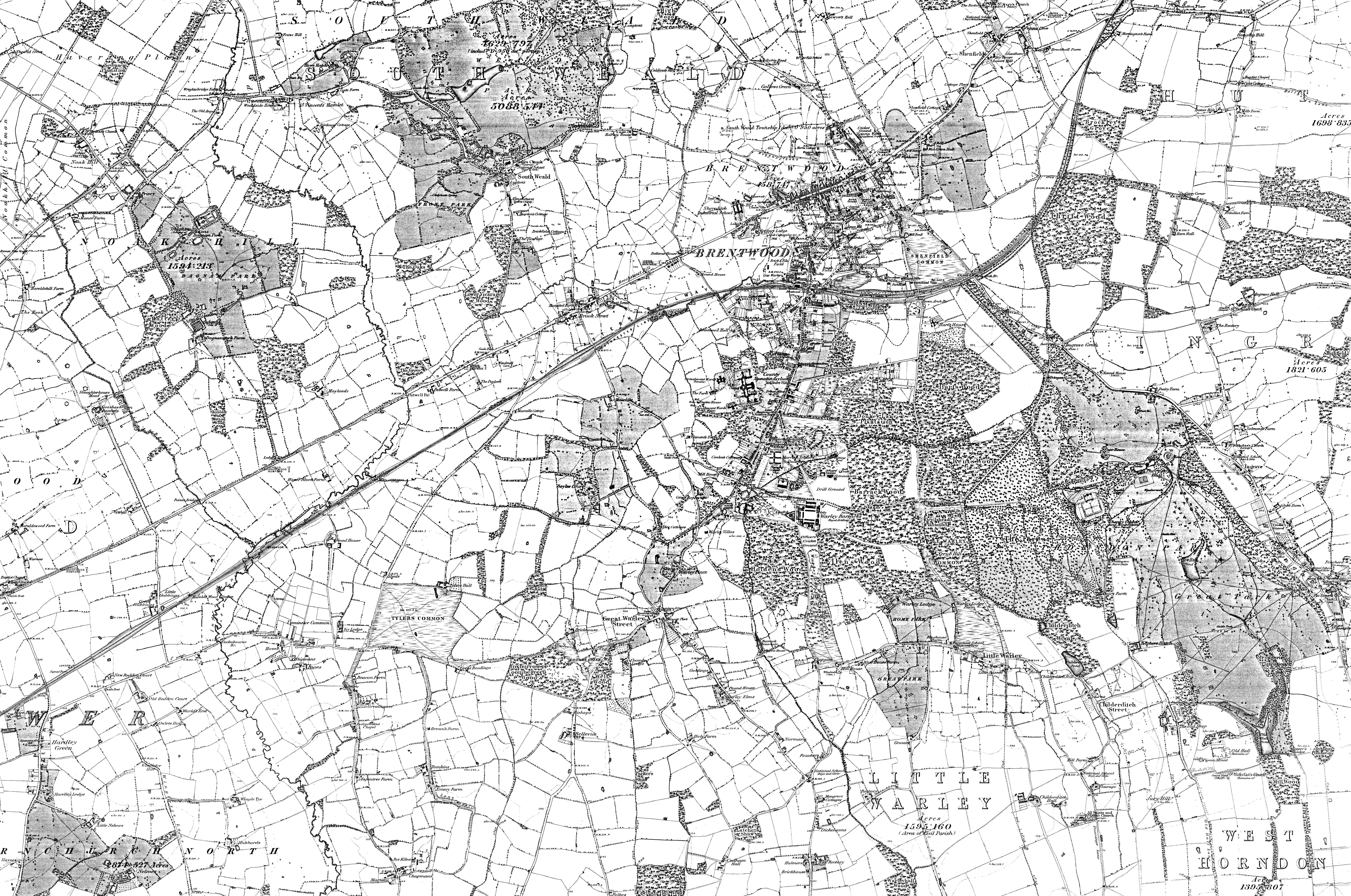
Extract from Map of Essex, Ordnance Survey, 1883 showing the small linear settlement, a typical hamlet

=== Toponymy ===
It was known only as Hardley Green in various orthographies (written forms) until at least the early 17th century. The first written name Haddeleye and all later forms evidence a clear corruption or natural progression of an older form, meaning "heath clearing" or perhaps more specifically "clearing [in the] heather" from the Old English hæth and lēah. It was last referred to as "Hardley Green" in 1883, so appearing in that year's Ordnance Survey map.

=== Local government ===
The place is an enlargement of a hamlet within the parish of Hornchurch. With various hamlets, Hornchurch, Havering-atte-Bower and Romford formed not a Hundred (division of a county for minor purposes) but a liberty, the Liberty of Havering. For many centuries the three old churches of these places remained of chapel and chapelry administrative status only, as the liberty matched the area of the ancient parish of Hornchurch, which provided a substantial living (benefice, of capital and income for the parish priest) in the church.

== Geography ==
Ardleigh Green has a small set of shops. The area naturally drains to form the headwaters of a stream, The Ravensbourne which briefly flows, before joining the River Rom.

== Transport ==
The nearest railway stations are Gidea Park, Harold Wood and Emerson Park. There are London Bus services to Hornchurch, Gidea Park and Romford.

== Education ==
Ardleigh Green has a combined junior and primary school, as well as Havering College of Further and Higher Education.
