= The Chase Nature Reserve =

Nature reserve in Dagenham, London, England

Coordinates: 51.556°N 0.185°E

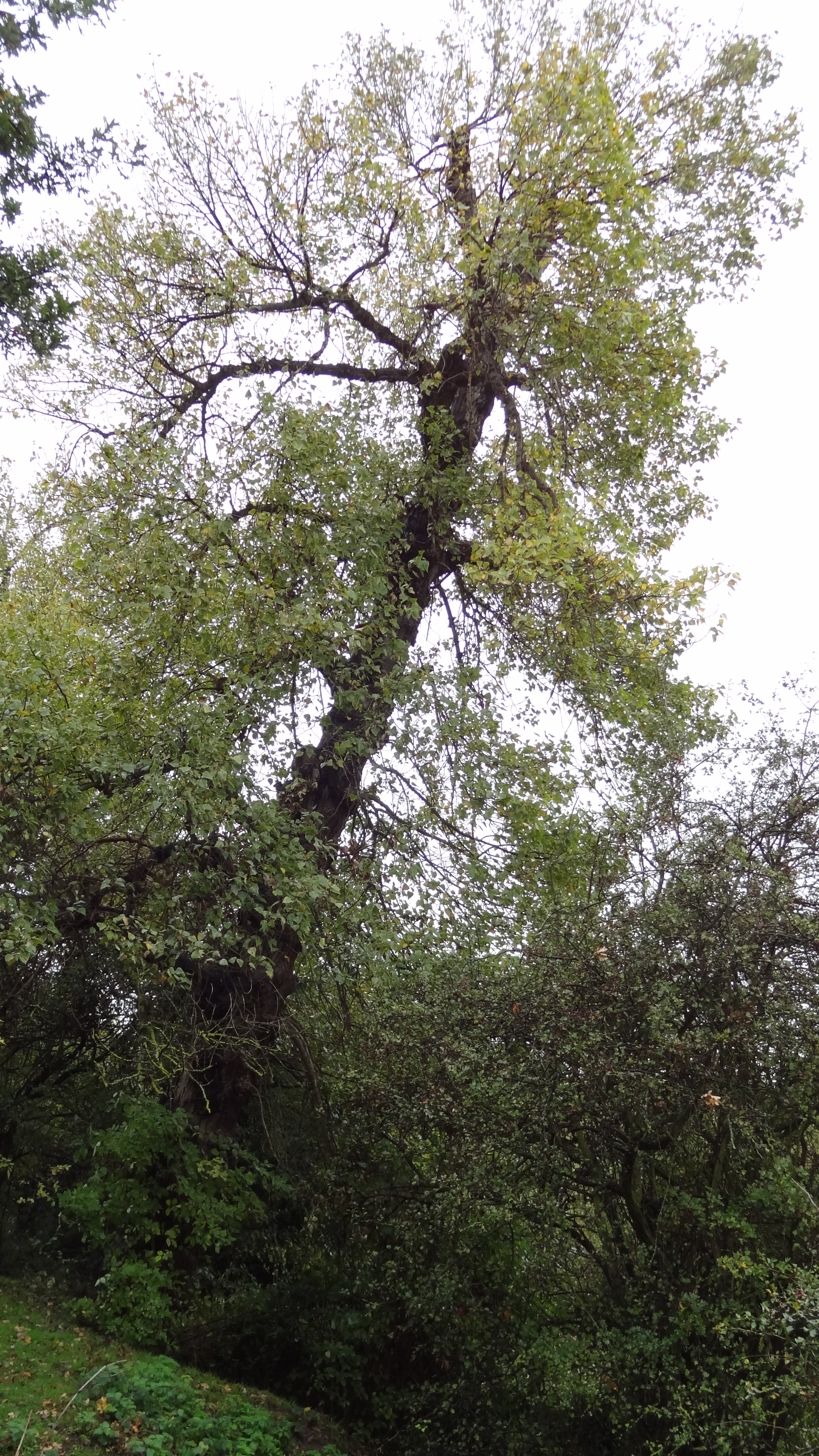
A Black Poplar in The Chase. It is Britain's rarest native tree

The Chase is a nature reserve in Dagenham in London. Most of it is in the London Borough of Barking and Dagenham, with a small part in Havering. It is owned by the boroughs, and managed by London Borough of Barking & Dagenham - Parks & Countryside Ranger Service. The boroughs have designated the sections in their respective boroughs as Local Nature Reserves. The Chase, together with the neighbouring Eastbrookend Country Park, is also designated a Site of Metropolitan Importance for Nature Conservation.

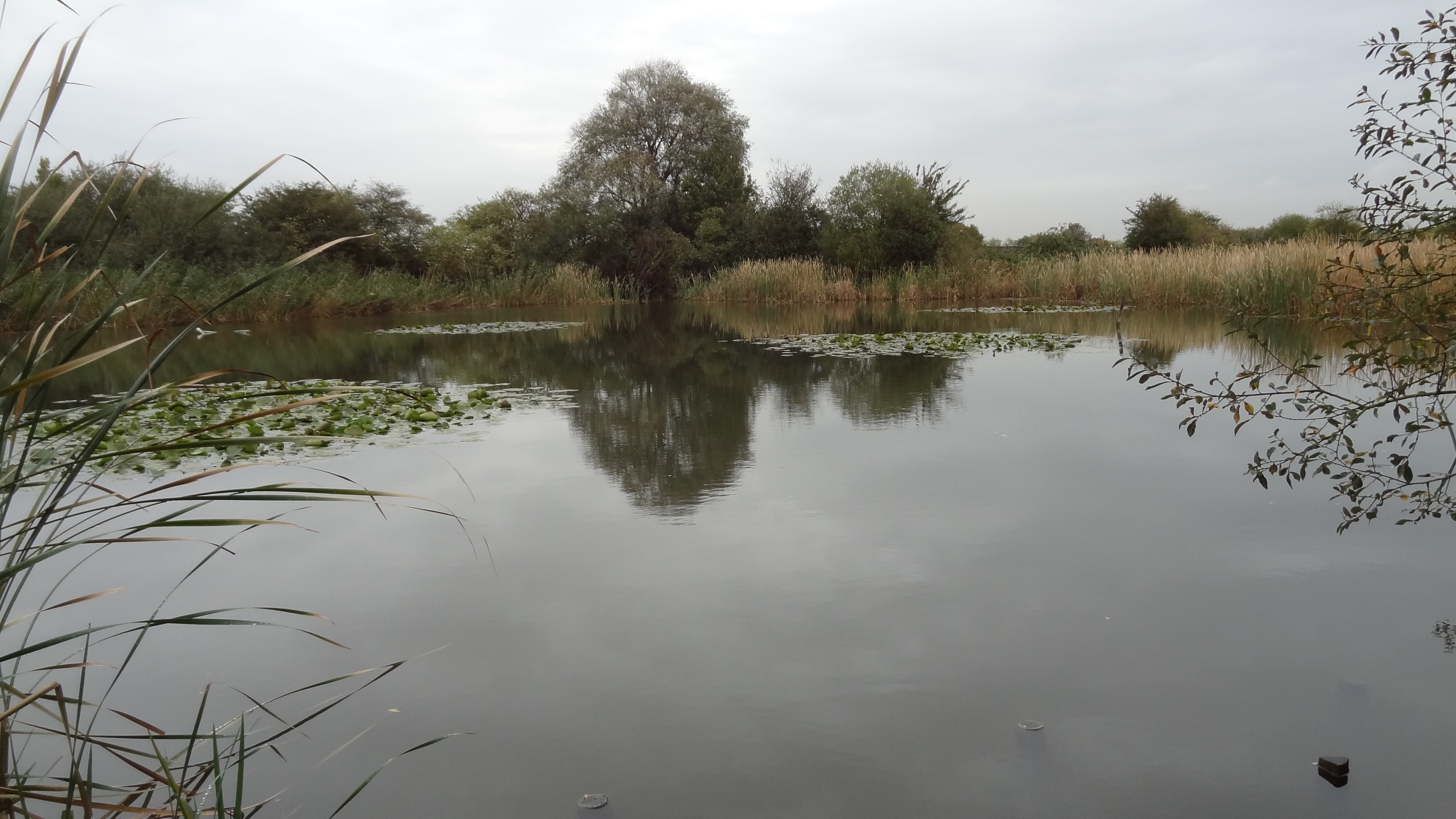
Hooks Hall Pond

The River Rom, which is the boundary between the boroughs, runs through the site, with Barking and Dagenham on the west side and Havering on the east. It was formerly a site of gravel extraction, and now has a diverse range of habitats. The River Rom has birds such as kingfishers, and the 190 species of birds recorded include skylarks, little ringed plovers and lapwings. It is also home to around 300 Green Parakeets who make their presence known with much noise, especially at sunset. Other animals include water voles, great crested newts, slow worms and badgers. The Black Poplar is Britain's rarest native tree, and the site has six of only six hundred female trees. Dry acid grasslands have some unusual species. Some areas are gazed by horses.

== Access ==
The reserve is divided into a wooded narrow strip along the River Rom north of the road called The Chase, and a large more open area with lakes to the south. The wooded strip east of the River Rom, which is in Havering, is crossed by a footpath between Roneo Corner, opposite Rom Valley Way, to The Chase (road). A footpath from Dagenham Road to The Chase (road) goes through the area on the west bank. The southern area is bordered on the west by Eastbrookend Country Park, and is linked by a footbridge over a railway line to Beam Valley Country Park to the south.
