= Thurrock Thames Gateway Development Corporation =

Defunct public sector organisation in the United Kingdom

- Formation: 2004
- Dissolved: 2012
- Headquarters: Thurrock
- Chairman: William McKee CBE
- Chief executive: Niall Lindsay

Thurrock Thames Gateway Development Corporation was a non-departmental public body in the United Kingdom sponsored by the Department for Communities and Local Government. It was an Urban Development Corporation set up by the Government of the United Kingdom covering the entire borough and unitary authority of Thurrock in Essex. It handled large planning applications in the borough, and was part of the government's plan for urban expansion in the Thames Gateway.

== History ==
Thurrock Thames Gateway Development Corporation was established in 2003 to drive economic growth in Thurrock, create homes, jobs and opportunities and make Thurrock a place where people want to live and work. It was given planning powers in 2005. The Corporation was given a target of creating 26,000 jobs and building 18,500 homes in the borough.

Its flagship projects included the Purfleet centre. During its lifetime 8,895 jobs were created and 5,969 housing units were built. The chairman was William McKee CBE and the chief executive was Niall Lindsay.

In 2007, following public consultation, it was planned for its remit to last until 2014. At the end of the premiership of Gordon Brown, there was an intention to merge the Corporation into the Homes and Communities Agency. However, following its emphasis on localism, the 2010 coalition government merged the Corporation with Thurrock Borough Council on 1 April 2012. Thurrock Thames Gateway Development Corporation was formally abolished on 31 October 2012.

== See also ==
- London Thames Gateway Development Corporation
