= Ripple Nature Reserve =

Nature reserve in Dagenham, London

Coordinates: 51.524°N 0.114°E

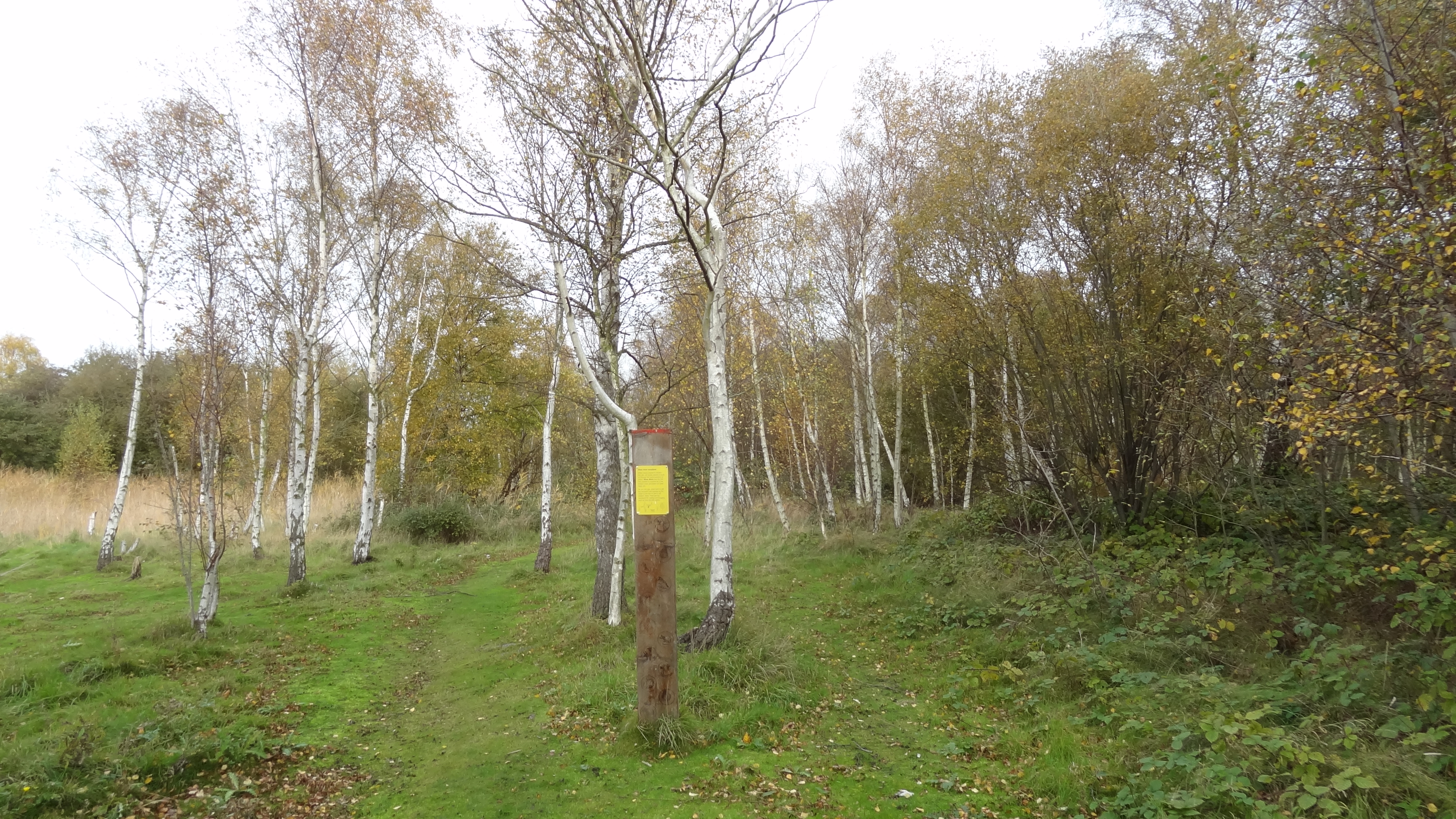
Silver Birch Wood

Ripple Nature Reserve is an 8.3-hectare (21-acre) Site of Metropolitan Importance for Nature Conservation and Local Nature Reserve in Dagenham in the London Borough of Barking and Dagenham. It is owned by the borough council.

The site is a mixture of woodland, scrub and grassland. Most soils in London are acidic, but this site has a very alkaline soil due to the dumping of fuel ash, and can therefore support locally unusual plants. The most important of these are pyramidal and southern marsh orchids, grey club-rush and wild basil. The site also has large numbers of rabbits and goldfinches. Some rare species of insects are present, including emerald damselfly.

Access is at the corner of Renwick Road and Thames Road.
