= Eastbrookend Country Park =

Nature reserve in London, England

Coordinates: 51.550°N 0.180°E

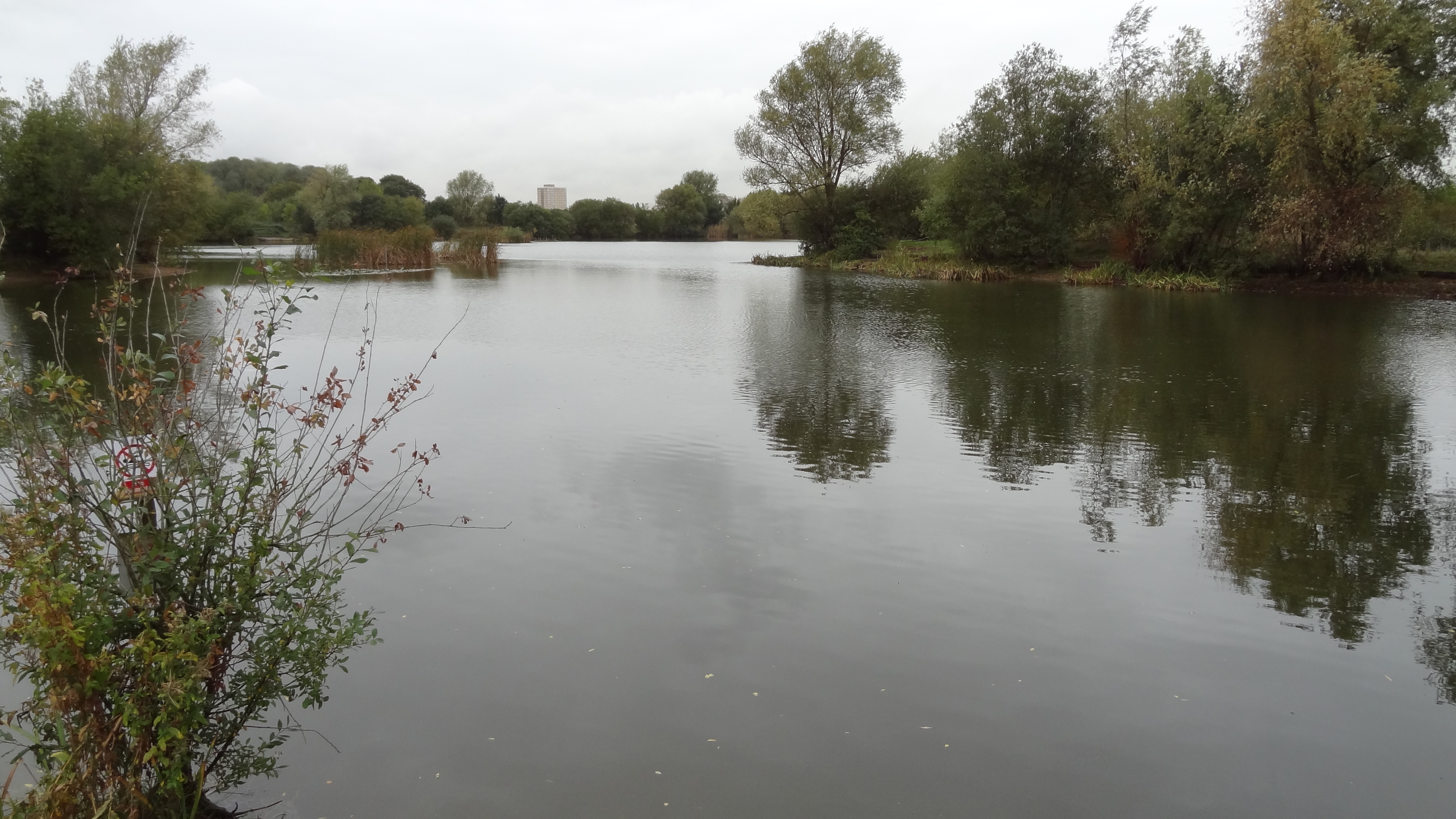
Bardag Lake

Eastbrookend Country Park is an 84-hectare park and Local Nature Reserve in Dagenham in the London Borough of Barking and Dagenham, in England. Together with the neighbouring Chase Nature Reserve it is also designated a Site of Metropolitan Importance for Nature Conservation.

The site was derelict land, which was turned into a park by large-scale earth-moving to create an undulating landscape with wild flower grassland mixes and over 50,000 small trees. It was opened in 1995. Facilities include a millennium centre and a fishing lake. it has a mixture of grazed wetland and dry habitats next to the River Rom. Dagenham Road goes through the park.
