= Beam Park railway station =

Planned railway station to serve Beam Park, London

Beam Park
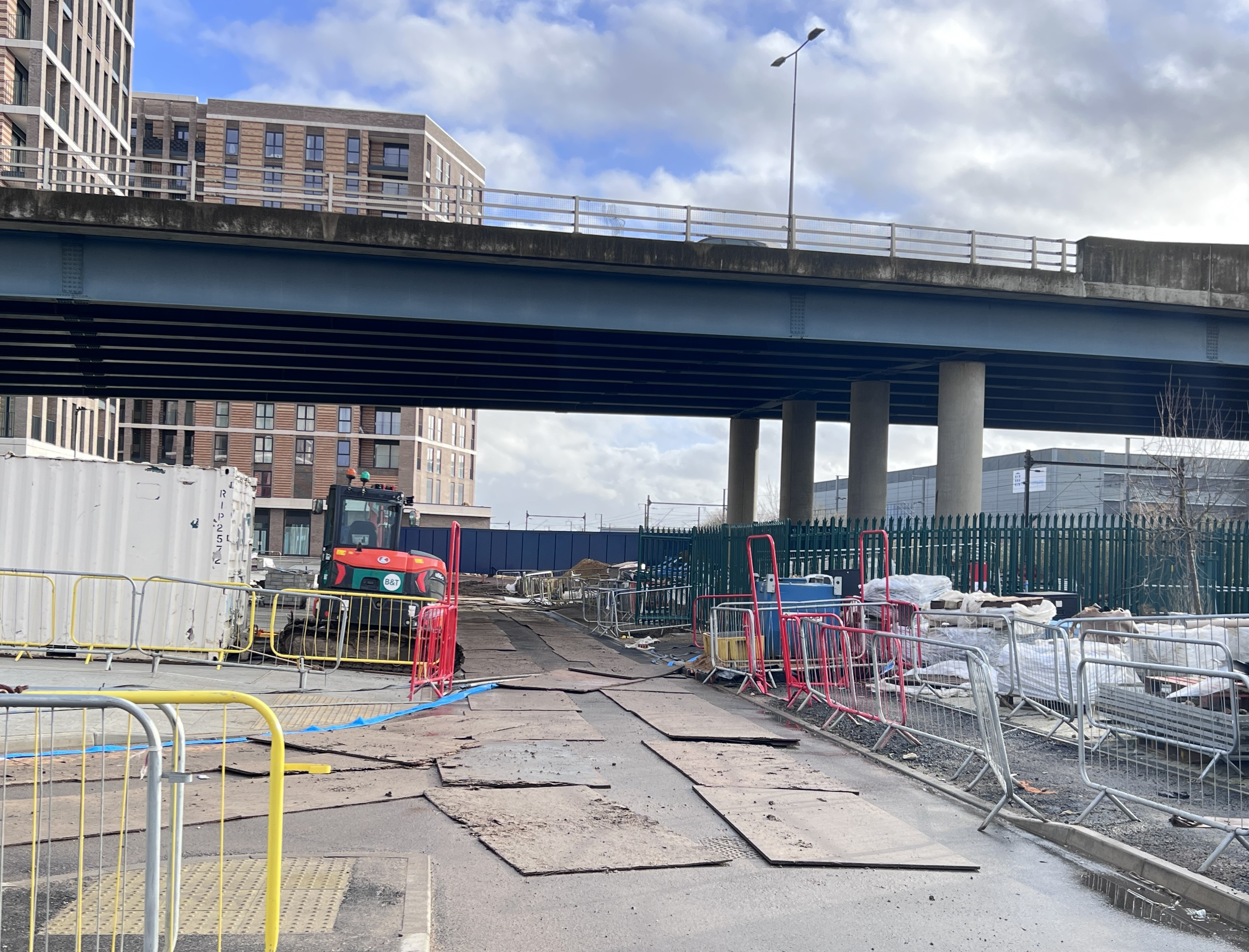
- Beam Park Station Square under construction

General information
- Location: Beam Park, Havering
- Coordinates: 51°31′25″N 00°10′13″E
- Owner: Network Rail
- Manager: c2c
- Platforms: 2

History
- Opening: TBC
Location
- Location in Havering

Beam Park railway station is a planned railway station to serve the new community of Beam Park. Intended to serve a redeveloped former industrial area with extremely poor access to public transport, plans for the station have been in development since at least 2002. Beam Park is a large housing development that extends from the London Borough of Havering, where the new station is proposed to be sited, into the London Borough of Barking and Dagenham. The construction costs of the station have been met by developers in the area and the Greater London Authority. The station received planning permission in February 2019. Development of the station was delayed from October 2021 to March 2026, when the introduction of passenger services was finally authorised by the Department for Transport. The station opening is expected to coincide with the building of the later phases of the housing development.

== Location ==
The new housing development of Beam Park extends from the London Borough of Barking and Dagenham in the west to the London Borough of Havering in the east. The station is intended to be located to the east of Marsh Way, on the Havering side. The station would have step free access to two platforms, situated between Dagenham Dock and Rainham stations on the Tilbury loop of the London, Tilbury and Southend line. The station site is on what was the initial section of the London, Tilbury and Southend Railway that opened in 1854. The line was electrified at 25 kV AC in 1961. The proposed station building within the development is on land owned by the Greater London Authority and would be situated on Station Square. Cycle parking will be provided between the station building and the platform. The site currently has a public transport accessibility level (PTAL) rating of between 0 (no access) and 1a (extremely poor access). Transport for London plan to relocate the terminus of bus routes 165 and 365 to Beam Park station.

The first residents moved into Beam Park in December 2020. A Grampian condition means the housing development could not proceed past the first phases until the station is built. In July 2024 the phasing of the development was altered by the Mayor of London, agreeing a variation of the development order. This permitted the construction of more homes before the station is built. In March 2026, Barking and Dagenham Council approved an amendment of existing planning permission so later phases of development that were being delayed until after the station opened could be built at the same time as the station.

== Station planning and construction ==
In 2002 the London Riverside Urban Strategy proposed new stations on the Barking to Rainham railway line at Renwick Road and Beam Park (identified then as CEME). The London Plan published in 2004 encouraged the development of additional stations on the rail corridor. Havering Council identified the potential for a new station, by now called Beam Park, in 2008. Havering Council became promoter of the station in 2012. The council submitted a successful bid to the Greater London Authority in 2014 for "Rainham and Beam Park" to become a housing zone, including delivery of the station. In 2014 the station was included in the London Infrastructure Plan 2050 produced by the Greater London Authority, with an expected completion date of 2020 and a capital cost of £15 million.

In December 2016 £9.6 million was awarded by the Greater London Authority to Havering Council to deliver the station. The station was added to Havering Council's local plan in 2016, with the intention of it being the focus of a new local centre. In 2017 it was expected that station construction would be complete in time for the December 2020 timetable recast. The Greater London Authority took over responsibility for promotion of the station from Havering Council in November 2018. In March 2019, Countryside agreed to provide a station building to a shell and core specification to a design by JSA Architects. Planning consent was issued in February 2019. Building work was expected to take place from December 2020. The new station was expected to open in May 2022. The Greater London Authority submitted a bid for £9.1 million to the Levelling Up Fund in May 2021 to support the construction of the station. In November 2024 a planning application was submitted to Havering Council for the station buildings. This received planning permission in October 2025.

== Provision of passenger services ==
In February 2012 the Department for Transport (DfT) began the process of renewing the Essex Thameside rail franchise by issuing a consultation to stakeholders. In July 2012 the responses to the consultation were published. Barking and Dagenham Council and Havering Council made representations about the provision of a new station at Beam Park and evidence was provided by Transport for London about the business case for the new station.

The DfT asked bidders responding to the July 2012 invitation to tender for the Essex Thameside franchise to prepare priced plans for the introduction of passenger train services at a new station at Beam Park, that could happen at any time during the period of the franchise. Bids were returned at the end of September 2012. However, the process was paused and then restarted in 2013 with a new invitation to tender issued. The draft franchise agreement contained provisions for the introduction of the station at Beam Park during the period of the franchise.

In June 2014 the franchise to run passenger services on the line from November 2014 to November 2029 was awarded by the DfT to incumbent c2c. The franchise agreement contained the provisions for services at Beam Park. National Express sold the franchise to Trenitalia in 2017. c2c was expecting work on the new station to start in 2018 and to take two years to complete. In July 2021 the franchise agreement was replaced with a rail contract that also made provision for a new station at Beam Park.

The plans for the station were thrown into doubt in October 2021 when the DfT claimed there was never any government support for the station and it would not authorise the commencement of passenger services. It was later revealed that the DfT had concerns the station would not have enough passengers to be viable and would attract passengers from the adjacent stations at Rainham and Dagenham Dock, despite the extensive house building in the area. The provision of the station requires an additional train and this was not taken into account. The Greater London Authority provided a ten year indemnity to protect the DfT against any operational losses.

In December 2022, c2c indicated it would need until May 2023 to study the likely impact of proposals for the station. The leader of Havering Council hoped that the station could open by 2025 with government intervention. In January 2023 the DfT indicated that approval for the station was unlikely to happen before early 2024. Development of the station remained blocked throughout 2023. In January 2024 it was revealed that progress had been made on getting approval for the station and a report into its viability would be completed by April 2024. Havering Council undertook a travel survey of residents and visitors in July and August 2024. In February 2025 the development was added to the New Homes Accelerator programme. In March 2026, the government announced that it would support the opening of the station, subject to final funding details being approved.

== Services ==
The current off-peak passenger service through the site is two trains per hour in each direction between Fenchurch Street and Grays and four trains per hour at peak times. Services are operated by c2c.

Preceding station	National Rail	Following station
	Future services	
Dagenham Dock	c2c London, Tilbury and Southend line via Rainham	Rainham
