= CEME =

Educational organisation in London, England

Coordinates: 51.518280°N 0.171118°E

Centre for Engineering and Manufacturing Excellence
- Presentation space
- Abbreviation: CEME
- Type: Nonprofit
- Purpose: Education and skills
- Headquarters: Marsh Way, Beam Reach
- Location: Havering, London
- Region served: Thames Gateway
- Website: ceme.co.uk

The Centre for Engineering and Manufacturing Excellence (CEME) is a not-for-profit education and skills organisation at Rainham, London in the London Borough of Havering.

The centre was developed as part of the Beam Reach area of the Thames Gateway regeneration, in a partnership between the London Development Agency and the Ford Motor Company.

Havering College of Further and Higher Education and Barking and Dagenham College run courses at the site under the name Thames Gateway College. CEME provides green technology retrofitting courses.

The CEME site includes conference meeting facilities for up to 300 people. The development site also accommodates 45 start-up companies.
