= London Thames Gateway Development Corporation =

- Formation: 2004
- Dissolved: 2013
- Type: Development Corporation
- Headquarters: London
- Location(s): Lower Lea Valley and London Riverside
- Chair: Lorraine Baldry; Sir Bob Lane
- Chief executive: Peter Andrews
- Website: www.ltgdc.org.uk

The London Thames Gateway Development Corporation (LTGDC) was a non-departmental public body sponsored by the Department for Communities and Local Government, with directors appointed by the Secretary of State, including some democratically elected councillors. It was an urban Development Corporation charged with redevelopment of two areas of northeast London, England that are within the Thames Gateway.

== History ==
The corporation was formed in 2004. From October 2005, it took over certain planning functions from the councils of the borough councils in its designated area. The Lower Lea Valley area was formed of parts of the boroughs of Hackney, Tower Hamlets, Newham and Waltham Forest. The London Riverside area was on the north bank of the River Thames and is formed from parts of the boroughs of Newham, Barking and Dagenham and Havering. The London Riverside area was contiguous with the area covered by the Thurrock Thames Gateway Development Corporation.

In the interests of localism, the 2010 coalition government announced its intention to close the corporation. Its functions were transferred back to the local boroughs and to the new London Legacy Development Corporation in April 2011, before it was wound down during 2012 and abolished on 28 February 2013. Land assets transferred to GLA Land and Property, a subsidiary company of the Greater London Authority.

== See also ==
- London Riverside
- Lower Lea Valley
- London Docklands Development Corporation
