= Thames Gateway =

Area around the Thames Estuary, London

Coordinates: 51.487°N 0.318°E

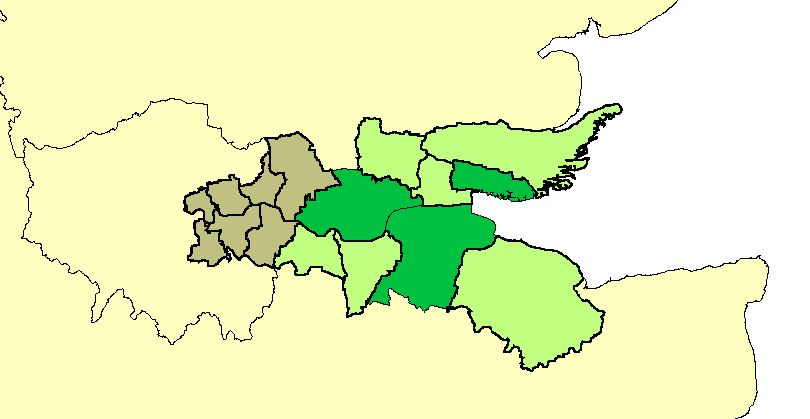
Districts of the Thames Gateway area, including the London boroughs (in brown), non-metropolitan districts (in green), and unitary authorities (in dark green)

Thames Gateway is a term applied to an area around the Thames Estuary in the context of discourse around regeneration and further urbanisation. The term was coined by the UK government and applies to an area of land stretching 70 kilometres (43 mi) east from inner east and south-east London on both sides of the River Thames and the Thames Estuary. It stretches from Westferry in Tower Hamlets to the Isle of Sheppey/Southend-on-Sea and extends across three ceremonial counties.

== Rationale ==
The area was designated during the early years of the Blair ministry as a national priority for urban regeneration because it contained large amounts of brownfield land and to take advantage of rail capacity improvements created at Stratford and in parts of Kent, by the High Speed 1 railway (officially known as the Channel Tunnel Rail Link). The term was first coined by the UK government, with the government and others also use the term Thames Estuary to apply to the area. Much of the brownfield land has now been redeveloped.

== Scope ==
The Thames Gateway has a population of over 3 million and comprises generally Thameside belts of 16 local government districts:

County	Districts
London	From the North East and South East London sub-region, the London boroughs of Barking and Dagenham, Bexley, Greenwich, Havering, Lewisham, Newham and Tower Hamlets. These have non-planning powers similar to unitary authorities, however are influenced in planning by the Mayor of London and London Assembly.
Essex	Planning authorities (influenced only by Essex County Council) (that is, non-metropolitan districts): Basildon, Castle Point and Rochford; and the (planning and) unitary authorities of Thurrock and Southend-on-Sea
Kent	Planning authorities (influenced only by Kent County Council) (that is, non-metropolitan districts): Dartford, Gravesham and western parts of Swale; and the (planning and) unitary authority of Medway

== Profile ==
The immediate settlements next to the types of land indicated, not taking the authorities as a whole, contains about half of the population of those authorities: 1.6 million people and contained in the 2000 survey some of the most deprived wards in the country, characterised by lack of access to public transport, services, employment and affordable quality housing, in particular having many overspill estates from earlier slum clearance and London's urban planning – examples being from Thamesmead to Southend-on-Sea.

Its boundary was drawn to capture the riverside strip that formerly hosted many land-occupying industries, serving London and the South East, whose decline has left a patchy legacy of dereliction and contaminated land. Striking precursor examples of development are those pioneered at Canary Wharf and on the Greenwich Peninsula, which the governments since 2000 have aimed to reflect across this area (having widespread comparable land use to those tracts of land).

Its brownfield land, farmland and wild salt marshland has been seen by successive governments and planners as having potential to act as a catalyst for the regeneration and growth and for the social advancement of the area, helping to alleviate some of the growth pressures on London and the South East. Amid steep house price inflation and an economic boom in 2004 the government also expressed the firm belief that new private sector housing here and elsewhere would reduce that inflation.

Parts of the area are of settled character and/or already densely populated with little scope for housing developments: Southend-on-Sea, for example, is the eighth most densely populated district in the country outside London and mass expansion is not desired owing to the river at the south, the need for leisure space and animal habitat (mostly in the buffer zones separating communities) and an economic desire and legal demand to preserve the existing character of housing estates.

== Administration and delivery ==
The Department for Communities and Local Government is responsible for co-ordinating the project.

The Thames Gateway project aims to improve the economy of the region through the development of marshland, farmland and brownfield land, through major transport infrastructure provision and the renaissance of existing urban conurbations.

Comparisons may be drawn with developments east of Paris along the Marne valley, which applied to a significantly smaller volume of land.

Formerly the development was in part delivered by the three regional development agencies: the London Development Agency (LDA – part of the Greater London Authority), the East of England Development Agency (EEDA) and the South East England Development Agency (SEEDA), as well as the national regeneration agency, English Partnerships.

Development that is supplemental to councils' own development plans is delivered through Local Authorities (Councils), special purpose development corporations and local enterprise partnerships, all of which are eligible for grants from government departments funded by HM Treasury. Additional government funds were supplied to the Regional Development Agencies who supported some projects in the Gateway.

== Former redevelopment zones ==
Formerly, the development was split into zones each with a different agency responsible for delivery. The zones were:

Region	Zones	Former delivery agencies
London	Isle of Dogs; Stratford; Lower Lea; Royal Docks; Barking Town Centre; London Riverside	London Thames Gateway Development Corporation
London	Greenwich, Deptford and Lewisham; Greenwich Peninsula; Charlton to Crayford	Greenwich Partnership and Bexley Partnership
South East	Kent Thameside (Dartford and Gravesham); Isle of Grain; Medway; Sittingbourne – Sheerness	Kent Thameside Delivery Board, Medway Renaissance Partnership, Swale Forward
East	Thurrock; Basildon and Castle Point; Southend and Rochford	Thurrock Thames Gateway Development Corporation, Basildon Renaissance Partnership and Renaissance Southend

== Developments ==
Before 2003 most conspicuous development was situated west of Beckton. There have been substantial housing schemes at Chafford Hundred, Chatham and Greenhithe and there is a large shopping centre at Bluewater.

Region	Project	Description	Status
London, East, South East	High Speed 1	High speed rail line linking Stratford and Ebbsfleet stations in the Gateway area to central London and continental Europe.	Fully operational.
London	Thames Gateway Bridge	Road bridge between Beckton and Thamesmead near to the existing Woolwich Ferry. Designed to provide segregated bus, tram or DLR carriage.	Cancelled
London	Stratford City	73 hectares (180 acres) mixed use site of 200 shops, three large department stores, cafés, schools, hotels, parks and health centres. 11,000 residents and 30,000 workers. Part of the site was used for the London 2012 Olympics.	Completed.
London	East London Transit	The East London Transit is an intermodal transport scheme to connect housing developments to rail and tube.	Phase I opened Feb 2010.
London	White Hart Triangle	Mainly derelict land close to Plumstead railway station that was developed with the aim of creating 2000 new jobs, with funding from the London Development Agency and European Union.	Completed
East	London Gateway	Port with logistics and a business park. The port was developed at Shell Haven, a 607 hectares (1,500 acres) site in Thurrock. The two schemes were originally expected to create up to 16,500 new jobs.	Completed
East	Southend-on-Sea	The council is using money provided through the scheme to redevelop the town centre and seafront and create a "transport corridor" along the A13.	
East	Basildon District	£2 billion major developments planned. These include the regeneration of Basildon, Wickford, Pitsea and Laindon town centres; a new sporting village, a health and education research centre, investment in the Basildon Enterprise Corridor business area, a wetland nature reserves in the Thames Marshes and investment in housing estates such as Craylands, Five Links and Felmores.	
South East	Ebbsfleet Valley	Ebbsfleet Valley was constructed in the area around Ebbsfleet International station. It consists of over 790,000 square metres (8,500,000 sq ft) of mixed-use development, including housing, retail, residential, hotel and leisure sites.	
South East	Swanscombe Peninsula	Previously the location of the Swanscombe Cement Works, this 130-hectare (1.3-square-kilometre; 0.50-square-mile) site, partly in both Dartford and Gravesham, is planned to have 2,700 homes and 500,000 sq ft (50,000 m^{2}) of office space.	
South East	The Bridge	Lying close to the Queen Elizabeth II Bridge on and around the site of the former Joyce Green Hospital, this 107-hectare (1.07-square-kilometre; 0.41-square-mile) development will have 1.5 million square feet (140,000 m^{2}) of business space and 1500 residences.	
South East	Dartford Northern Gateway	In early 2006 SEEDA (The South East England Development Agency) purchased a 2.6-hectare site on the edge of Dartford which had been used by Unwins, an off-license chain, which went into administration in 2005. They also purchased the neighbouring Matrix Business Centre to protect its future. They intend to develop the site with a mixture of retail and other businesses and housing. It is also the home to The Orchestra of the Thames Gateway, an organisation that has given more than 230 performances in the Gateway area up until the end of 2009.	
South East	Stone Castle	It is located to the north of Bluewater Shopping Centre and will be a mix of residences, a new publicly accessible linear park in St Clement's Valley and a high quality business park set back from St Clement's Way. Phase 1 is known as Waterstone Park, where about 200 of an eventual 650 residences have been built.	
South East	Northfleet Embankment	An industrial site of 74 hectares (0.74 km^{2}) with 1.9 km of river frontage. Key sites have been acquired by SEEDA to prepare for the re-development of the area, which could potentially begin once the Northfleet Cement Works moves to the Medway Valley in 2008.	
South East	Chatham Town Centre & Waterfront	Projected to deliver 1500 new homes, plus a variety of other projects, including the Dickens World tourist attraction (opened May 2007, closed 2016); the Great Lines City Park; refurbishment and expansion of the Pentagon shopping centre with 1,4000 square metres of new stores and leisure facilities; a new 'cultural quarter' centred on Medway REACH, a new 2000 seat auditorium. Funding is being sought for a cable car system across the River Medway.	
South East	Gillingham Waterfront	1000 new residences and 200 new jobs were projected to be created on this 32-hectare site by 2010. This site includes the Peel Group "Chatham Waters" site and the Berkeley Homes "Victory Pier" housing development.	
South East	Rochester Riverside	Key sites have been acquired by Medway Council and other areas are being acquired SEEDA to prepare for the re-development of the area, with 30 hectares being cleared and decontaminated. Proposed plans include 1700 new residences. Planning permission was granted in late 2017. 2.5 kilometres of new river wall have been constructed, with the site also being raised by 2 metres.	
South East	Strood Riverside	About 500 new homes, improved waterfront access and improved flood defences. This site has not yet started construction.	
South East	Temple Waterfront	A 21-hectare site with a possible 600 new homes and part of the waterfront designated for nature conservation. According to Medway Renaissance, the potential for a new railway station is being investigated.	

== Environmental implications ==
Proposals for a large international airport on Cliffe Marshes were dropped from the government's white paper on air transport in 2003 after they were rejected by local residents, the local council, as well as conservation charities such as the RSPB. The plan, which would have required the raising the ground level by 15 m. was also rejected by the Confederation of British Industry as too expensive.

On the question of airport capacity, the Government had established the independent Airports Commission, headed until 2015 by Sir Howard Davies. The Commission examined the nature, scale and timing of any requirement for additional capacity to maintain the UK's global hub status. The Aviation Policy Framework of March 2013 was an important piece in the jigsaw, setting out the principles which the commission would take into account in presenting its recommendations reported in 2013 and in 2015. The options included an outside possibility of a floating airport off the Isle of Sheppey.

Historically the north of Kent has always been marshland but has been coming under great pressure by developers. A public inquiry found in favour of a rail freight depot proposed by ProLogis at Howbury in Slade Green. The proposal was to develop part of the Metropolitan Green Belt in the Crayford Marshes beside the existing railway depot. Roxhill Developments Ltd. had sought to modify the planned 149 acre "sustainable distribution park with modern multi modal connections" since at least 2015.

The London Development Agency perceived some strategic merit in the proposals, but local councillors were not convinced that such a depot would truly encourage train movements as an alternative to road haulage. This scepticism arose partly because the railways in the area are heavily used by scheduled passenger trains, to the extent that the projected Crossrail programme seemed unlikely to progress to Dartford unless new tracks were laid to boost local rail capacity. The ProLogis appeal was upheld by a 2007 Public Inquiry on the basis that the proposal supported the Energy policy of the United Kingdom and generated new jobs. Counter-arguments included that eventual warehouse occupiers would not use the site in the manner suggested, that continuous noise levels would exceed WHO Community Noise Guidelines at homes in Moat Lane and that night-time noise levels risked generating complaints from residents at Moat Lane and Oak Road.

The Environment Agency advised that future development in the "Thames Gateway" must go hand-in-hand with flood risk management, and take account of future plans for flood protection. The Agency insisted it was important that effective flood risk management of the whole Estuary be not prejudiced by premature decisions and developments.

The Government addressed some of these environmental concerns by designating the Thames Gateway as the UK's "eco-region", first announced in the 2007 Thames Gateway Delivery Plan. The objective of the "eco-region" was to protect and enhance the sustainability of the "Thames Gateway" in terms of environmental quality, carbon reduction, and support for "green" economic development. This vision was elaborated in the 2008 Thames Gateway "eco-region prospectus", and implementation efforts were led by the Homes and Communities Agency with support across government and [unspecified] local stakeholders.

== Cultural references ==
The liminal and sometimes bleak settings of the Thames Gateway have inspired several cultural works.

- Nicola Barker has written a loose trilogy of novels termed Thames Gateway.
- Iain Sinclair's novel Dining on Stones follows the A13 from London to Essex.
- Graham Swift's novel Last Orders involves a journey down the A2/M2 corridor from London to Margate.
