= Castle Green railway station =

Proposed railway station in England

Castle Green
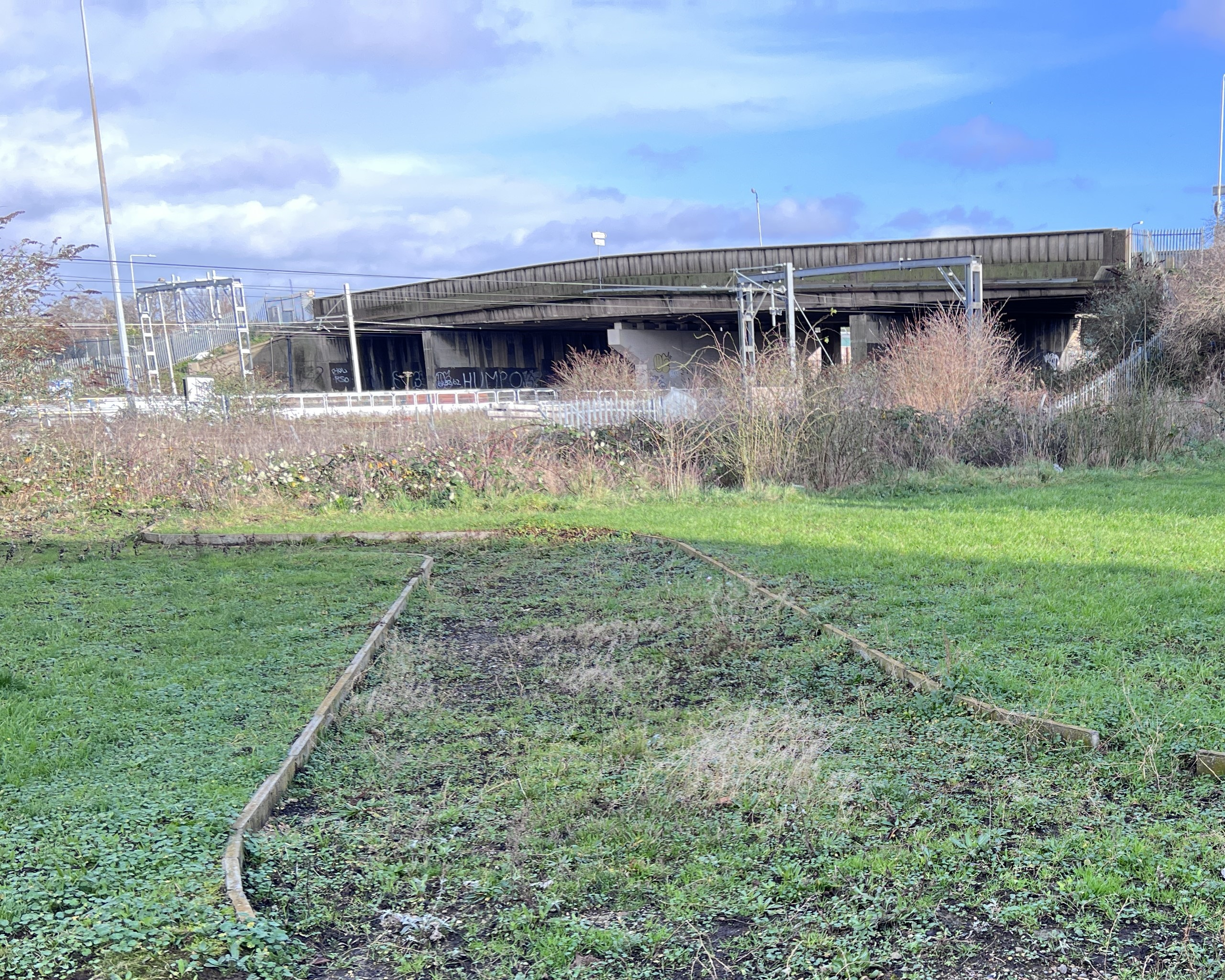
- Castle Green railway station site from the southwest
- Interactive map of Castle Green

General information
- Location: Barking
- Local authority: London Borough of Barking and Dagenham
- Managed by: London Overground
- Number of platforms: 2

Key dates
- 2002: Station proposed
- 2017: Site safeguarded

Other information
- Coordinates: 51.5295°N 0.118°E

Castle Green is a proposed railway station in the London Borough of Barking and Dagenham. Plans for a station at the site, initially called Renwick Road, have been in development since at least 2002. The new station was first proposed to be between Barking and Dagenham Dock on the London, Tilbury and Southend line. In 2017 a station was safeguarded on the extension of the Gospel Oak to Barking line between Barking and Barking Riverside. The station would serve the communities of Castle Green, Thames View Estate and new housing developments in the area.

== History ==
In 2002 the London Riverside Urban Strategy proposed new stations on the Barking to Rainham railway line at Renwick Road and Beam Park. The London Plan published in 2004 encouraged the development of additional stations on the rail corridor.

Following the cancellation of the Docklands Light Railway extension to Dagenham Dock project in 2008, an investigation was undertaken from 2012 to 2014 to consider cheaper alternatives. Among the options considered were bringing forward the 2002 station proposal on the Barking to Rainham railway line or extending the London Underground (District line or Hammersmith and City line) from Barking to Grays along the same alignment. Both schemes would have resulted in a station on the Renwick Road site.

In August 2017, the Government granted permission for the extension of the Gospel Oak to Barking line to Barking Riverside, safeguarding provision for a stop at Renwick Road and stating that a further extension across the River Thames should be likewise provisioned as necessary.

As part of the preferred route, a stop at Renwick Road was safeguarded for future construction. An alternative site near Alfred's Way was rejected, and all other options such as the nearby freight yards were considered unfeasible. The station would lie east of the point where the Barking Riverside extension splits from the Tilbury loop line but before the tracks diverge to the south. c2c services will operate on separate lines to the north and south of the London Overground running lines, without an interchange between the two services. This will mean the station's construction will not disrupt the c2c services. The new station could generate 5,000 homes.

Barking and Dagenham Council submitted a bid to the Housing Infrastructure Fund in February 2019. This included £22m for the delivery of Castle Green station.

In 2020 Castle Green station was added to the Barking and Dagenham Local Plan 2037.

Barking Riverside station was opened in July 2022, with space left for the Castle Green station to be built in future. In November 2022, Barking and Dagenham Council noted that they were working with Transport for London to develop a business case for the new station.

== Location ==
The station would be located on Renwick Road and is linked with plans to divert the A13 road between Barking Creek and the London Sustainable Industries Park. In September 2020 the cost of the tunnel and the station was estimated at £800 million. The proposed station would have an island platform with two faces. It would serve the communities of Castle Green, Thames View Estate, the northern part of Barking Riverside and other new housing developments in the area.

To the north on Ripple Road (A13), London Buses routes 173 and 287, and school routes 673 and 687 will serve the proposed station. To the south on Choats Road, London Buses route EL2 will serve close to the proposed station. A proposed London Buses route, EL4 would pass over the site of this proposed station.

Future services
Preceding station	London Overground	Following station
Barking towards Gospel Oak	Suffragette line Gospel Oak to Barking line	Barking Riverside Terminus
