= Castle Green, London =

Park and suburb in England

Coordinates: 51.533328°N 0.122395°E

Castle Green
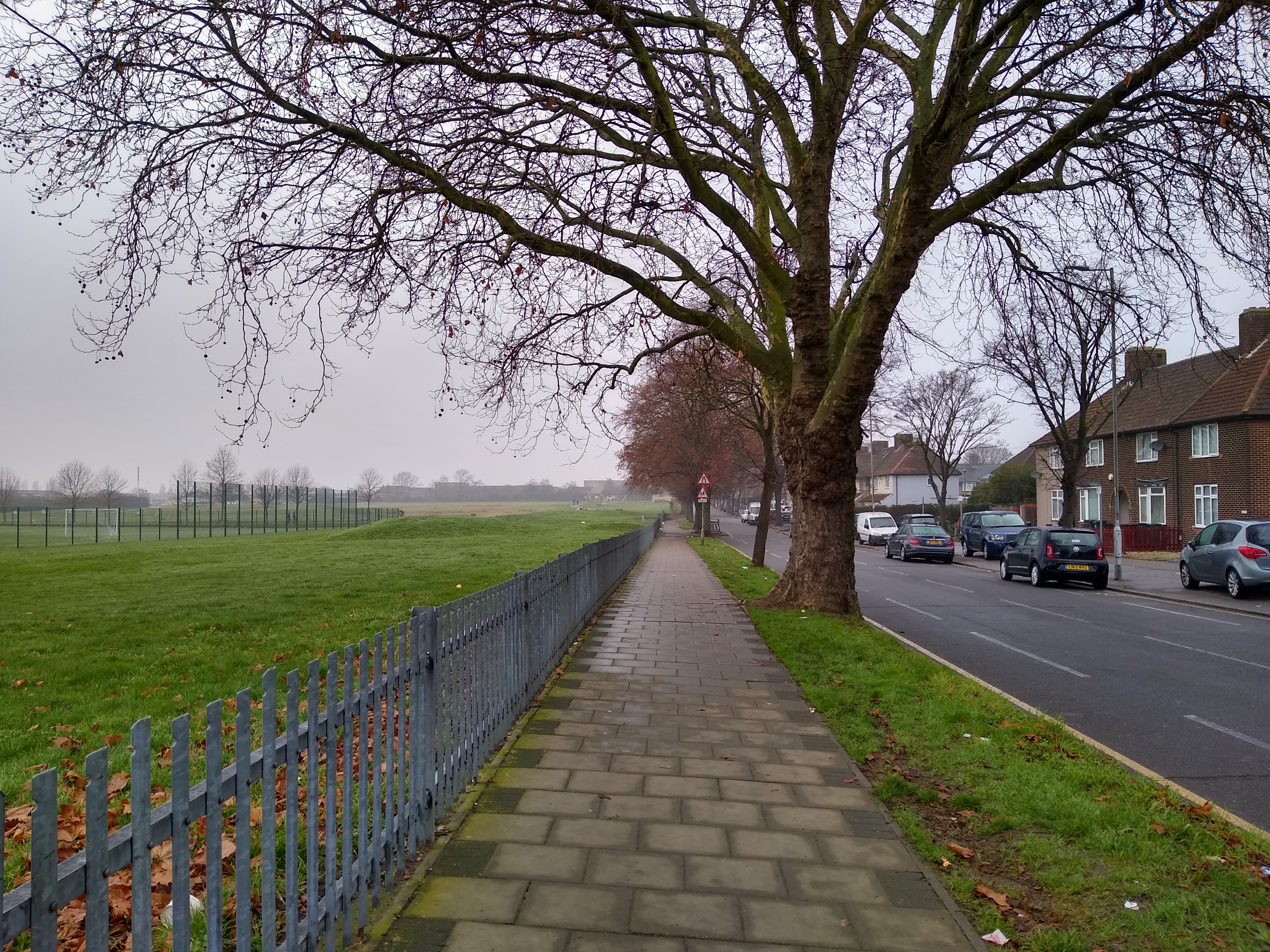

- Location within Greater London
- OS grid reference: TQ472837
- London borough: Barking & Dagenham
- Ceremonial county: Greater London
- Region: London
- Country: England
- Sovereign state: United Kingdom
- Post town: DAGENHAM
- Postcode district: RM9
- Dialling code: 020
- Police: Metropolitan
- Fire: London
- Ambulance: London
- UK Parliament: Barking
- London Assembly: City and East

Castle Green is a park and suburb in the London Borough of Barking and Dagenham, United Kingdom. The locality is close to Creekmouth and is part of the Becontree estate.

Castle Green contains a secondary school, Jo Richardson Community School, a library, theatre, arts and conference spaces, sports facilities which house Barking RFC and a community centre.

== History ==
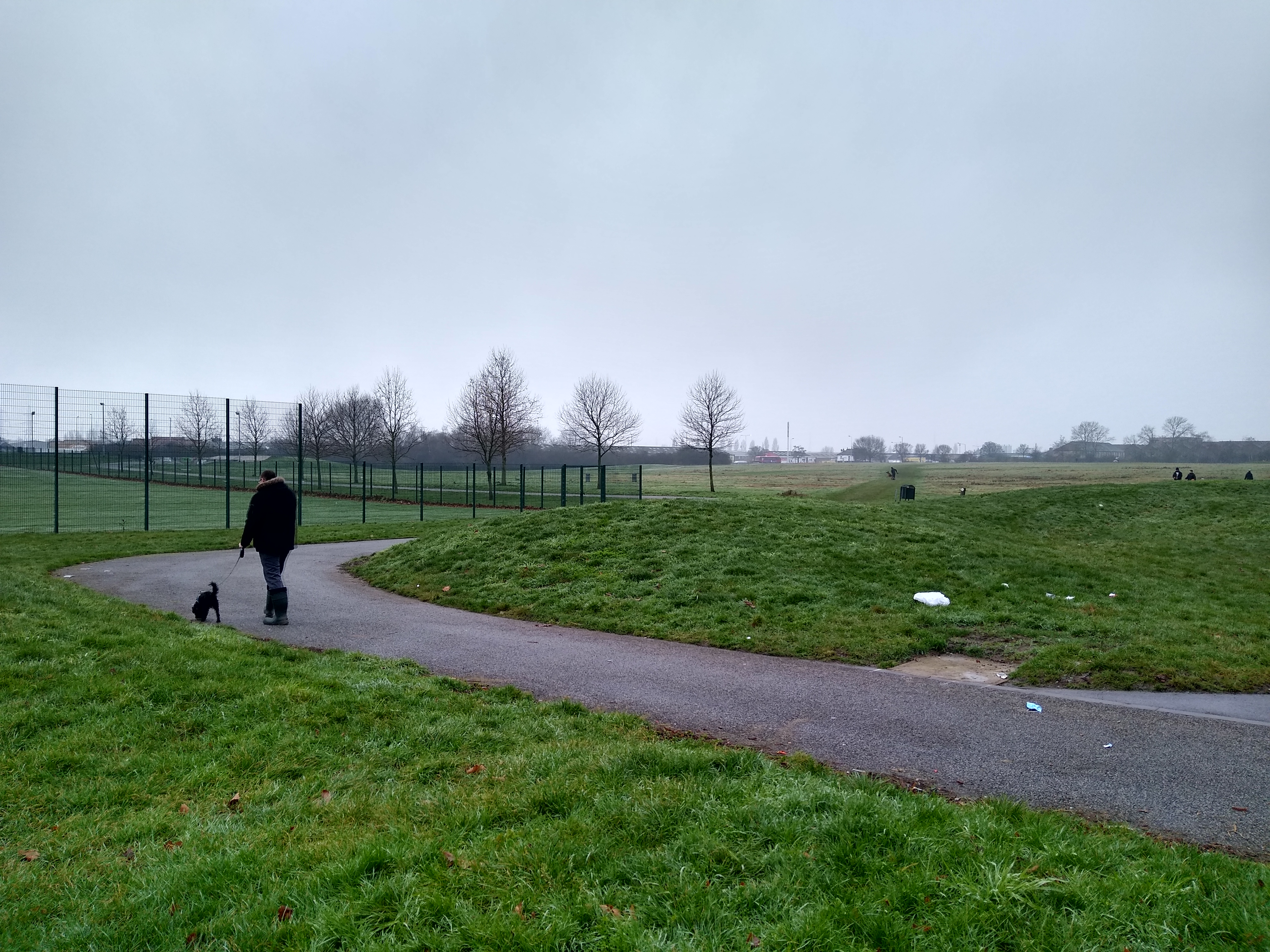
Castle Green Recreation Ground

The area was rural into the 18th century but was dominated by manorial estates dating from the mediaeval period. Some of these were demolished for market gardening with the expansion of the city. In the 1920s, the manors of Parsloes and Valence were acquired for the Becontree housing estate; remnants of the manors still exist as parks. Valence House now houses the Valence House Museum. Over the 19th century, industrialisation moved into the area; the borough remains the most industrialised in London. The growth in population necessitated urban expansion. The area became important as a place for social reform. With the expansion came a need for public parks as amenities. In the 1890s Barking town centre became planned out with Barking Park being established in 1898. The Becontree estate was created between 1919 and 1935 as a public housing for returning soldiers and to relieve overcrowding in the centre of London, covering the last of the borough's rural area. The estate accommodated a population over 167,000 and also included Valence and Parsloes parks, Mayesbrook Park, Castle Green and Goresbrook Sports Ground.

Tha name dates back over 200 years to a time when the area was rural. The "castle" that gave its name to the place was a castellated house which was built around 1800 and survived until 1938.

== Transport ==
London Buses routes 173 and 287 serve the area.

The nearest station is Becontree. Barking & Dagenham Borough Council have proposed a new London Overground railway station.
