= Tantony =

Short name for Saint Anthony the Abbot

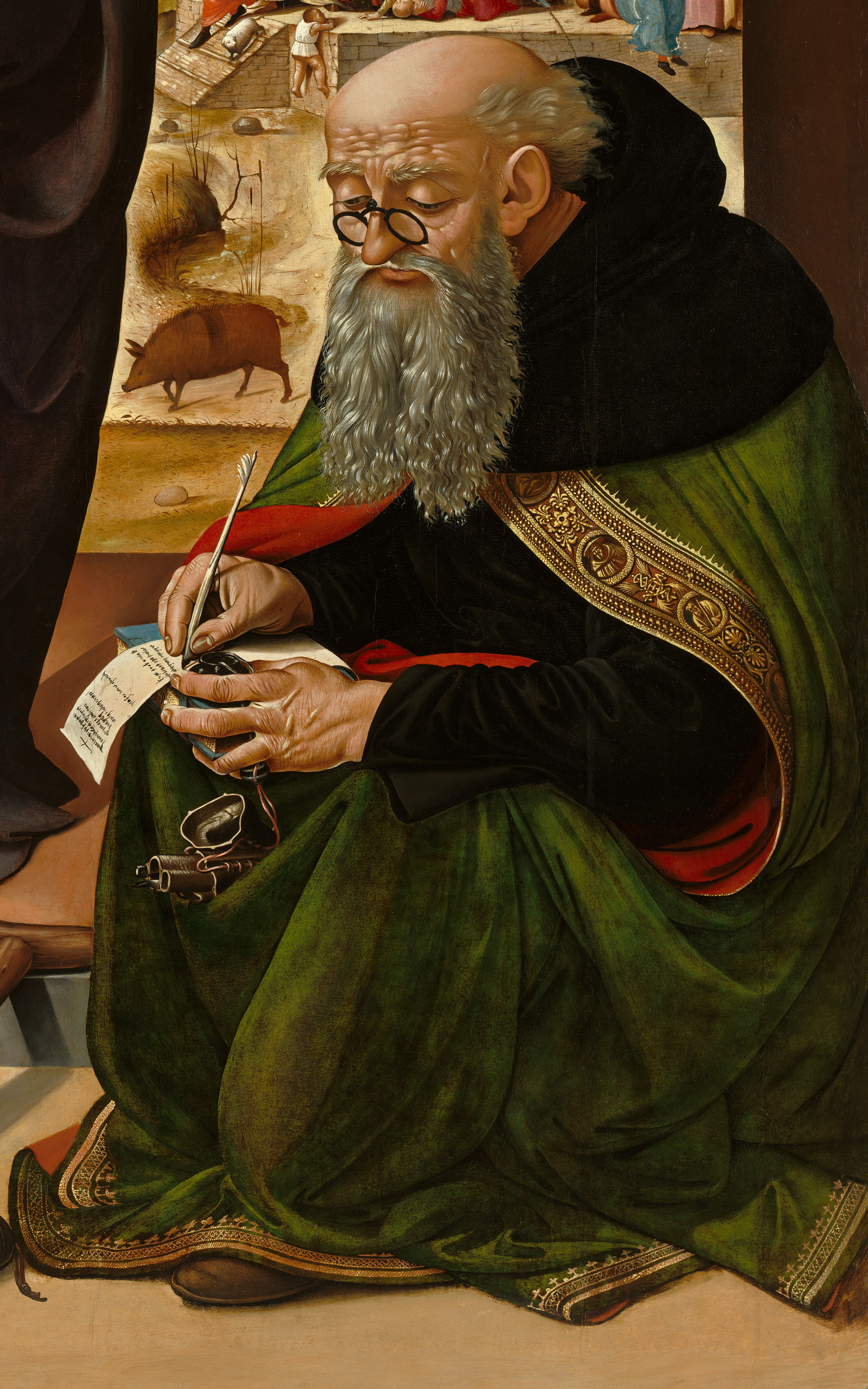
St. Anthony the Abbot (detail), (with his companion pig shown in the background) by Piero di Cosimo, ca. 1480

Tantony is a shorted form of the name of St. Anthony the Abbot, a prominent figure among the Desert Fathers. It is used in reference to the attributes by which the saint is represented. These primarily are the Tantony Pouch, Tantony Bell (a small church bell), Tantony Pig (the smallest pig of the litter).

Anthony became the patron saint of swineherds, due to the reported relationship a pig had with him in keeping him attuned to the hours of the day for his prayers, one of several animals who played a role in his life. Thus he is most frequently represented as accompanied by a pig.

In Spain and its former colonies, this Anthony is honored as the patron saint of domestic animals. They would be blessed on his feast day (17 January), as today is done elsewhere for the feast of St. Francis of Assisi. Large bonfires are still lit on this day in Spain for the feast, with reveling held around it, focusing on the consumption of pork and sausages.
