= River Rom =

Rom Beam
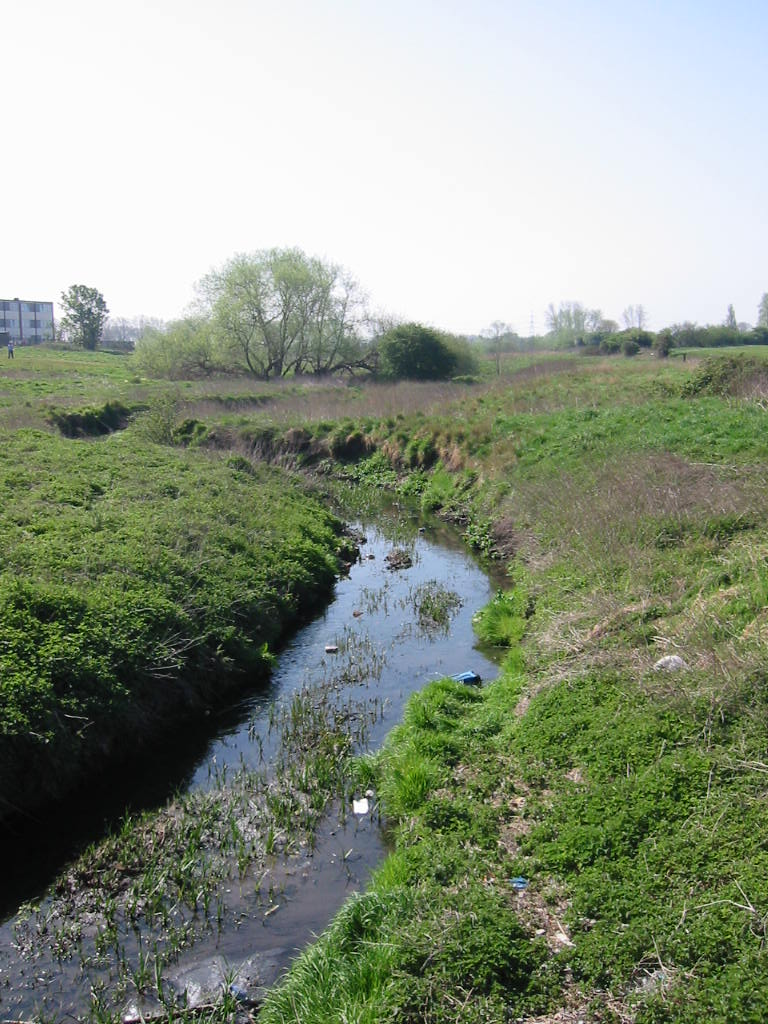
- River Beam at Dagenham

Location
- Country: England
- Counties: Greater London
- London boroughs: Havering, Barking and Dagenham
- Towns: Romford

Physical characteristics
- Source
  - location: Romford
- Mouth
  - location: River Thames, Dagenham
  - coordinates: 51°30′45″N 0°9′33″E
- Discharge
  - location: Bretons Farm
  - average: 0.34 m^{3}/s (12 cu ft/s)
  - minimum: 0.03 m^{3}/s (1.1 cu ft/s)22 August 1976
  - maximum: 17.8 m^{3}/s (630 cu ft/s)2 October 1993

Basin features
- Tributaries
  - left: The Ravensbourne

The River Rom, also known as the River Beam below its confluence with the Ravensbourne (Note: One of two large streams in London with this name, this part-rural Ravensbourne has not been destroyed to allow dense urbanisation with a surface drains network), is a tributary of the River Thames in England that flows through the east London suburbs around Romford before joining the Thames at Dagenham.

Part of the river forms a section of the boundary between the London boroughs of Barking and Dagenham and Havering. The Rom is culverted as it passes through the centre of Romford.

== Course ==
Course of the River Rom

Starting in Essex, the Rom is the continuation of the Bourne Brook after Bournebridge, Stapleford Abbotts in the Epping Forest district of Essex which rises 3 miles (4.8 km) northeast at Spring Farm by Stapleford Abbotts Golf Course in the Essex Borough of Brentwood.

Taking an almost straight south-flowing course, the Rom passes under the London Loop and experiences a drop of 24 metres (79 ft) in elevation before it enters the ringroad enclosed town centre of Romford where it goes underground in a culvert, a man-made tunnel, at 16m AOD. To the south of the town centre it regains green banks and adjoins the retail park on Rom Valley Way, passes under Roneo Corner, divides two residential estates at 8m AOD and enters Eastbrookend Country Park where it is joined by a tributary, The Ravensbourne that has flows through Emerson Park (a residential area) and then a park, Harrow Lodge Park, from its source in Ardleigh Green. (Note: Emerson Park and Ardleigh Green are residential parts of the post town Hornchurch)

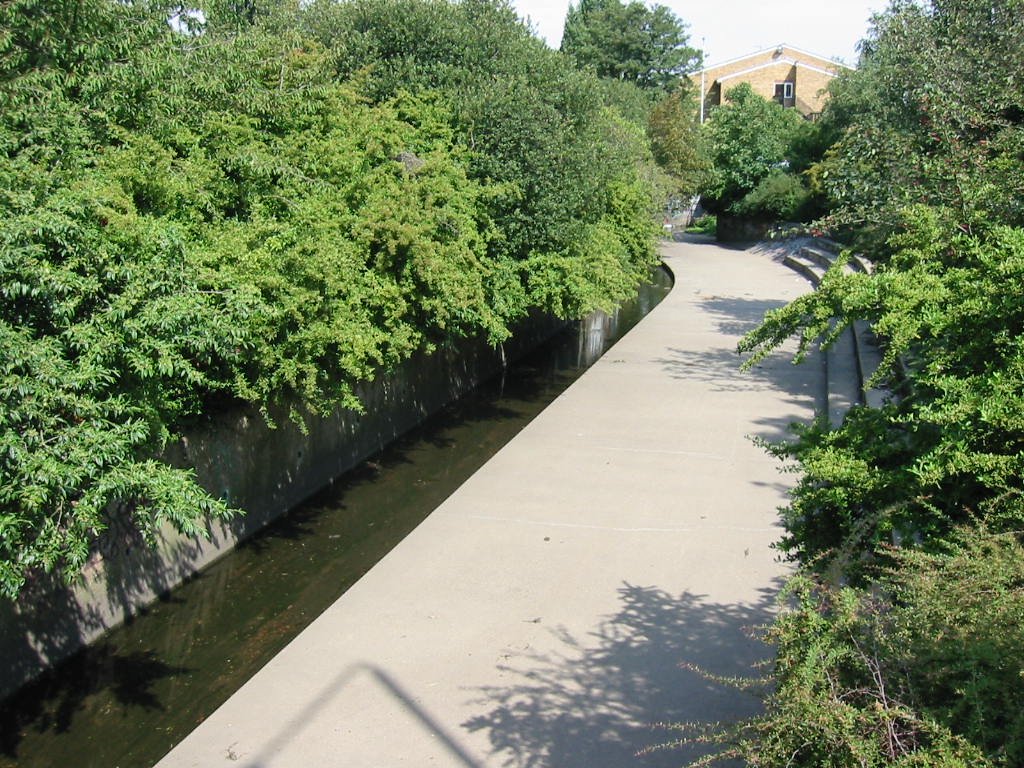
The river is culverted north of Roneo Corner and runs underneath Romford

The Rom then continues under the name of the Beam and forms the boundary between the London Borough of Havering and the London Borough of Barking and Dagenham before reaching the River Thames in the Dagenham industrial estate which included the Ford Motor Company works. The Beam Valley comprises 182 acres (0.74 km^{2}) of land running the entire stretch of the river. The valley also includes various historical features including tank traps, pillboxes and a section of the old Romford Canal.

== Etymology ==
Rom is a back-formation from the name of the town of Romford, which is located on a crossing of the river. The name 'Romford' is first recorded in 1177 as Romfort, which is formed from 'rūm' and 'ford' and means "the wide or spacious ford". The name of the river is first recorded in the 13th century as le Markediche, meaning 'boundary ditch' and referring to the ancient boundary between the parishes of Dagenham and Hornchurch which later gained borough status. A more recent name for part of the river of the Beam originated from an early bridge over the river, consisting of a beam of wood.

== Wildlife and environment ==
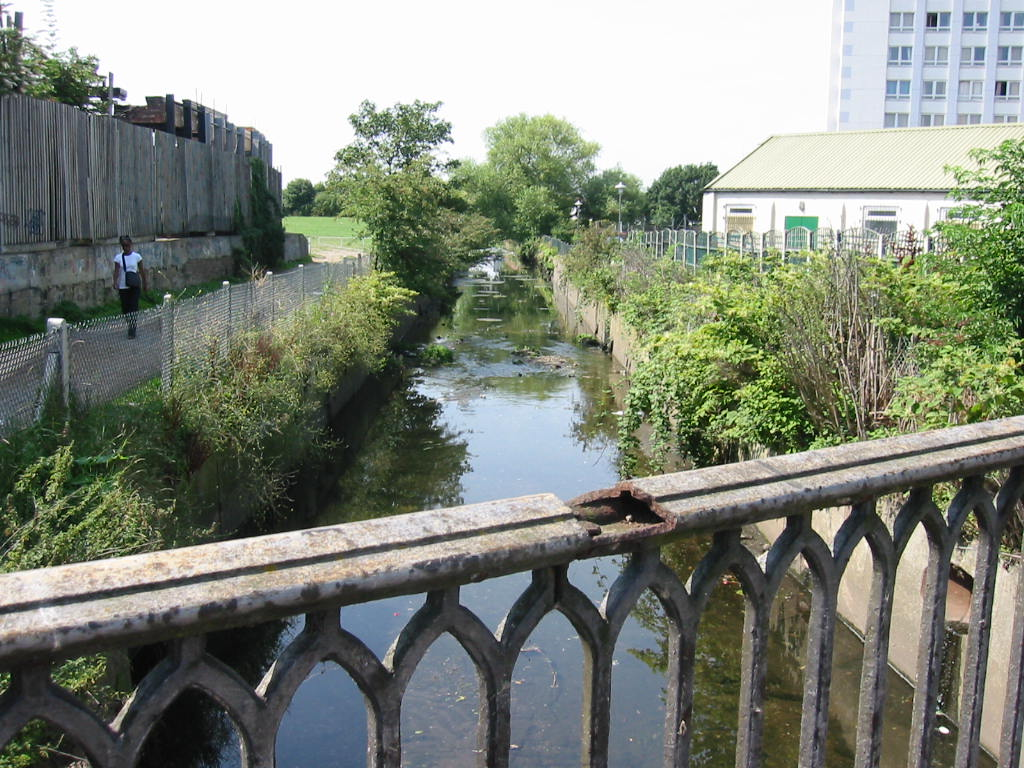
The river emerges south of Roneo Corner

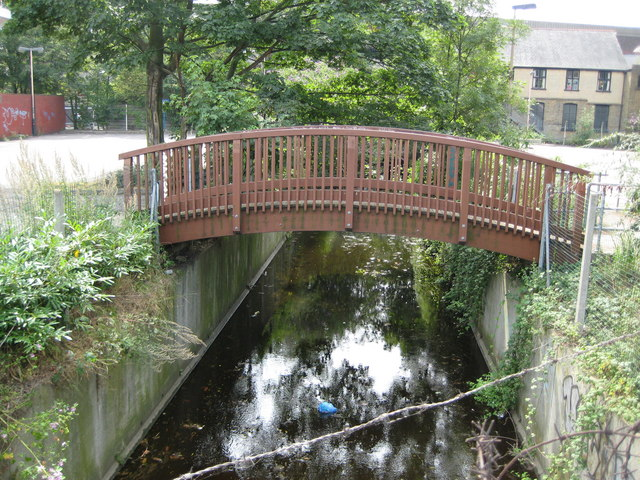
River Rom in the north of Romford

Throughout the northern section, where the Rom starts, in the north western part of the London Borough of Havering its valley has been designated as a Site of Importance for Nature Conservation The river contains unbranched bur-reeds (Sparganium erectum and Sparganium emersum) and fool's watercress (Apium nodiflorum), and supports water voles, kingfishers and reed buntings. Surrounding farmland has lapwing and Eurasian golden plover in winter. Apart from the river environs, the Site of Importance for Nature Conservation also includes Foreberry Wood through which the river runs. This contains both pedunculate oak and hornbeam coppices.

Also in the upper parts of the river is another Site of Importance for Nature Conservation where the river flows through King George Playing Fields in Romford.

=== Beam Valley ===
Further downstream, the Beam Valley is a mixture of woodlands, acid grassland, ponds and marsh areas, a habitat for many types of wildlife. The London Boroughs of Barking and Dagenham and of Havering plan to develop the area to improve the conservation interest and to create new opportunities for recreation and education. The River Beam is home to the rare water vole, while the grassland in the valley includes certain rare and endangered plants.

== Tributaries ==
=== The Ravensbourne ===
The Ravensbourne is a tributary which rises to the NNE in Ardleigh Green (part of the Hornchurch post town) and flows through two green suburbs of Romford and Hornchurch viz. Emerson Park and Harrow Lodge Park, before joining the Beam at Eastbrookend Country Park.

== Crossings ==
Crossing	Type	Coordinates	Opened	Notes	Photo
Michael Cullen Bridge	Footbridge, bicycle bridge		2014		
Beam Bridge	Road bridge				

== See also ==
- Tributaries of the River Thames
- List of rivers in England

== Notes and references ==
Notes

Next confluence upstream	River Thames	Next confluence downstream
Wogebourne (south)	River Rom	River Ingrebourne (north)
