= King Edward VI School, Southampton =

Private day school in Hampshire, England

Coordinates: 50°55′22″N 1°25′01″W

King Edward VI School

Location
- Southampton, Hampshire, SO15 5UQ; England

Information
- Type: Private day school
- Motto: Dieu et mon droit (God and my right)
- Established: 1553; 473 years ago
- Founder: William Capon
- Department for Education URN: 116580 Tables
- Head teacher: Neal Parker (Senior) Rebecca Smith (Prep)
- Staff: approx. 130
- Gender: Coeducational
- Age: 11 to 18
- Enrolment: 960
- Houses: Lake, Capon, Watts, Sylvester, Reynolds and Lawrence
- Sports: Rugby Union, Hockey, Netball, Cricket, Football, Swimming, Sailing
- Former pupils: Old Edwardians
- Website: https://kes.school

King Edward VI School (also known as King Edward's, or KES) is a selective co-educational private day school founded in Southampton, England, in 1553. The Senior and Sixth Form site is on Hill Lane, Southampton whilst the Preparatory School is located in Romsey.

The school was founded at the request of William Capon, who bequeathed money in his will for a grammar school for the poor. King Edward VI signed the necessary Royal Charter in 1553 and the school opened in 1554. King Edward's became an independent school in 1978 and accepted girls into the sixth form in 1983. It became a fully co-educational school in 1994. It is a member of the Headmasters' and Headmistresses' Conference, and is a registered charity. The school roll is approximately 950 pupils.

The current building was designed by the English architect Ernest Berry Webber in the early 1930s.

== History ==
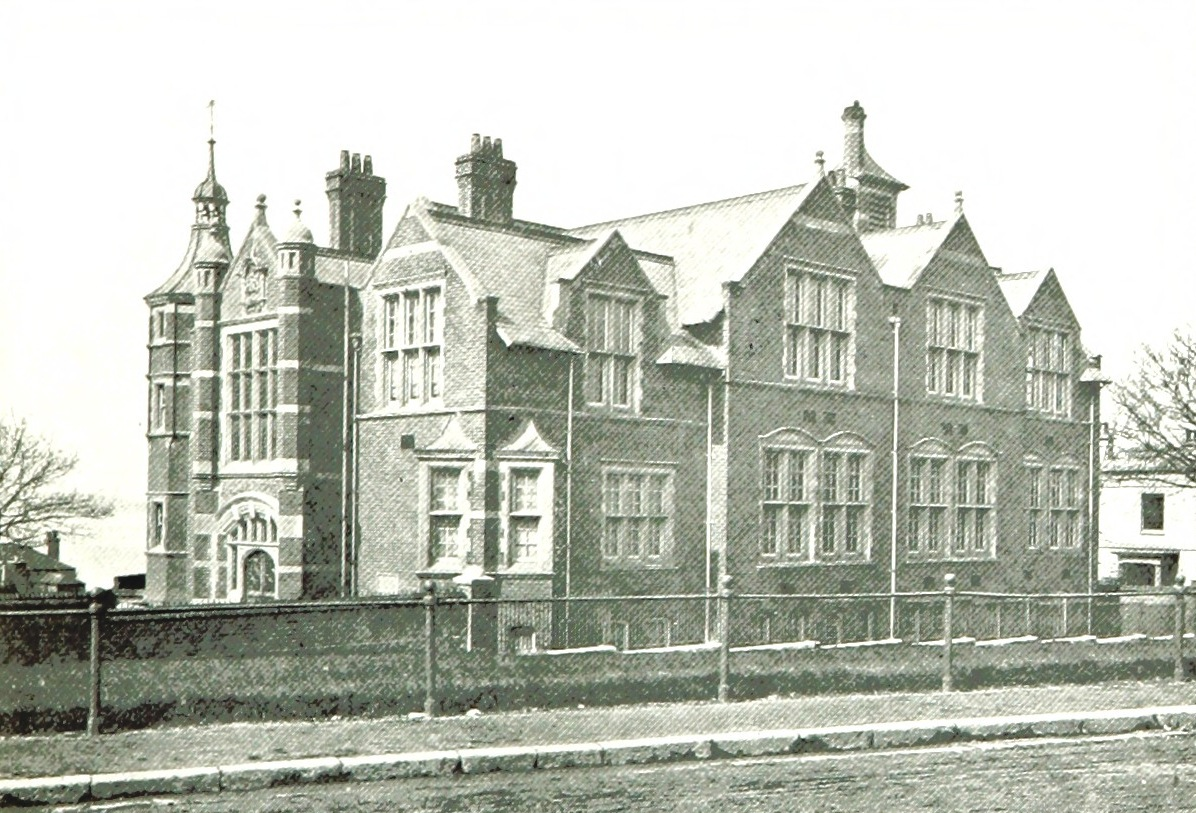
The old school building in the 19th century

King Edward's was founded in 1553 when King Edward VI signed the necessary Royal Charter for a school to be built out of the proceeds of the will of William Capon, who had died in 1550 and bequeathed money for a grammar school for the poor. The school opened in 1554; it became an independent school in 1978, and accepted girls into the sixth form in 1983. It became a fully co-educational school in 1994. It is a member of the Headmasters' and Headmistresses' Conference.

The current building was designed by the English architect Ernest Berry Webber in the early 1930s. Webber was a prolific designer of public buildings, including the civic centres at Southampton, Dagenham, and Hammersmith.

== Traditions and day-to-day life ==
The main School building, designed by Ernest Berry Webber

The school motto is Dieu et mon droict (French for God and my right, referring to the monarch's divine right to govern) and is generally used as the motto of the British monarch. Originally it was spelled Dieut et mon droict, the Early Modern French spelling, but later the 't' in "Dieut" was dropped in accordance with present French orthography. In the 1970s the motto was 'Pax Huic Domui', 'Peace to this House' (traditionally the words a priest says when visiting a sick person). The school hymn is Our God, Our Help in Ages Past, written by a famous former pupil, Isaac Watts. The clock tower at the Civic Centre, Southampton plays the same tune at 4, 8, and 12 o'clock, after it has chimed the hour.

In 2011, 100% of pupils achieved 5+ A*-C GCSEs (or equivalent) including English and maths, with 85% achieving all English Baccalaureate subjects. The average fifth year student was entered for 11.2 qualifications.

As well as a main playing field, and an area of artificial turf large enough to accommodate 12 tennis courts, King Edward's owns 33 acres (130,000 m^{2}) of sports grounds called Wellington on the edge of Southampton, where there is a water based astro pitch, along with netball courts, tennis courts, and a large number of grass pitches.

== Old Edwardians ==
=== House named after them ===
- William Capon (priest and School Founder)
- Arthur Lake, bishop
- Thomas Lawrence, physician
- Edward Reynolds, bishop
- Josuah Sylvester, poet
- Isaac Watts, minister and hymnist

=== Other notable former pupils ===
- Edward Abraham, biochemist
- Hugh Ferris, television, radio, podcast and events presenter
- John Heath, entomologist
- Eric Meadus, artist
- Gordon Messenger, general, former Vice-Chief of Defence Staff
- Basil Mitchell, academic, philosopher and theologian
- Hugh Mitchell, actor
- Peter Smith, architectural historian
- Hannah Snellgrove, sailor
- Hugh Whitemore, playwright and screenwriter
- Joe Weatherley, cricketer
- Ben Mayes, cricketer

== Preparatory schools ==
King Edward VI School has operated their mixed gender preparatory school of Stroud school since 1 January 1943. The school was founded in 1926 at Greyswood, Surrey but relocated to Highwood Lane, Romsey in 1953 where it remains today. Its age range is 2-11 and it operates nursery facilities for younger ages. The current head of Stroud is Mrs Rebecca Smith. Among notable alumni there is Rishi Sunak, former Prime Minister of the United Kingdom.

On May 13, 2025, King Edward VI School announced their merger with Prince's Mead, a 3-11 school in Kings Worthy which is scheduled to go into effect on September 1.
