= Becontree Heath =

Coordinates: 51.563595°N 0.152614°E

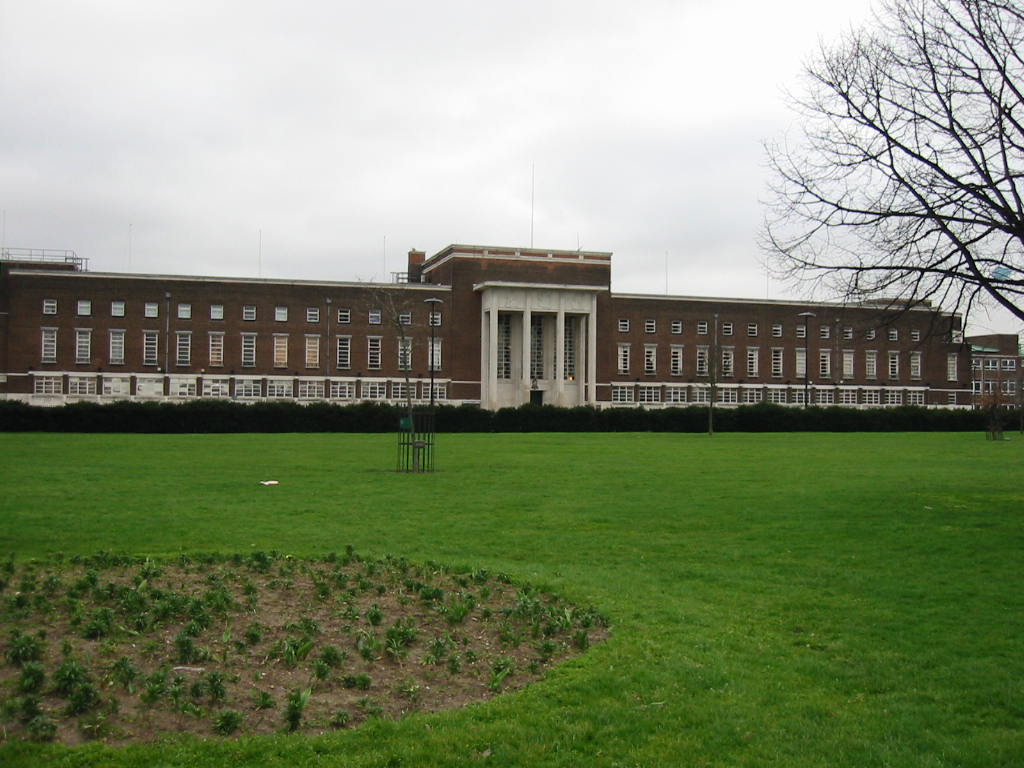
- Dagenham Civic Centre

- Location within Greater London
- OS grid reference: TQ493871
  - Charing Cross: 12.5 mi (20.1 km) WSW
- London borough: Barking & Dagenham
- Ceremonial county: Greater London
- Region: London
- Country: England
- Sovereign state: United Kingdom
- Post town: DAGENHAM
- Postcode district: RM8
- Dialling code: 020
- Police: Metropolitan
- Fire: London
- Ambulance: London
- UK Parliament: Dagenham and Rainham
- London Assembly: City and East

Becontree Heath is an open space in the London Borough of Barking and Dagenham. The name has also been applied to the local area, in particular to the RM8 postal district.

== History ==
Becontree Heath functioned as the ancient meeting place for Becontree hundred, which covered much of what is now East London. In 1465, the hundred lost territory in the east and the meeting place became located on its fringe. When it was still a rural parish, Becontree Heath was a hamlet in Dagenham.

== Geography ==
It is the location of Dagenham Civic Centre, a grade II listed, 1930s art deco building designed by Ernest Berry Webber and the former town hall of Dagenham Borough Council.

It is also the location of the high density Becontree Heath Estate, built by Barking Borough Council from 1966 to 1970.

Crowlands Heath Golf Club can be found there, along with Becontree Heath Leisure Centre.

== Education ==
Local education is listed on the London Borough of Barking and Dagenham article.

== Transport ==
Becontree Heath Bus Station
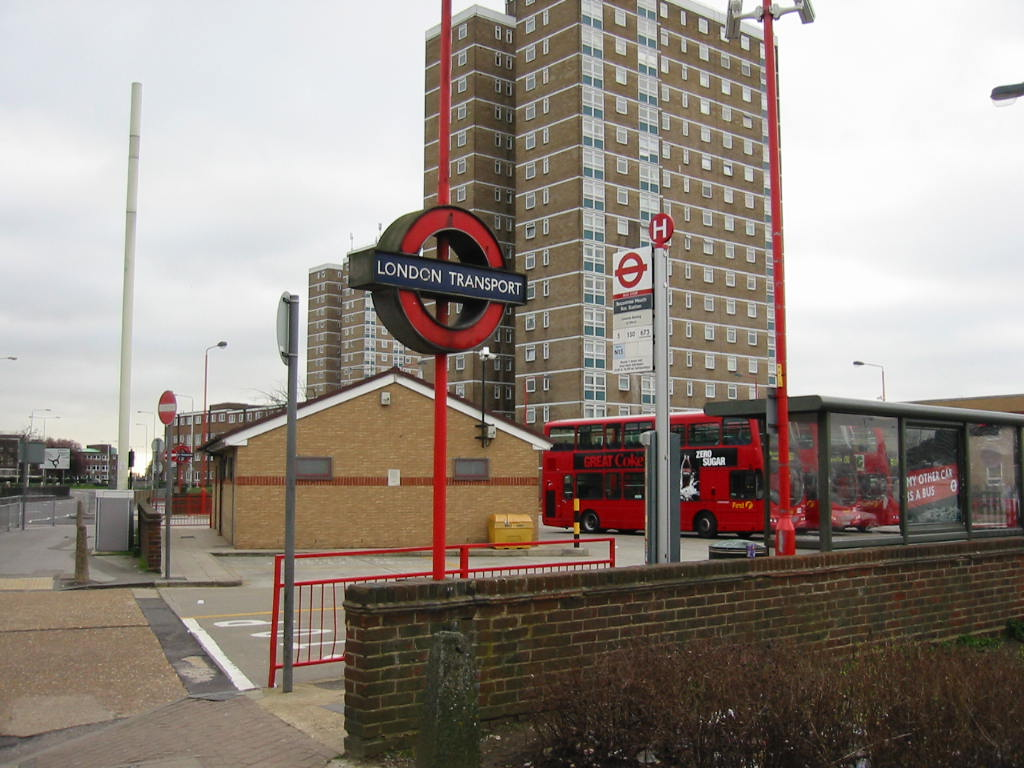

General information
- Location: Becontree Heath; Barking and Dagenham
- Operator: Transport for London
- Bus routes: 150 (towards Chigwell Row); EL2 (towards Dagenham Dock)
- Bus stands: 2
- Bus operators: Arriva London East London Transit (Blue Triangle)
Location

Becontree Heath was served by the former Becontree Heath Bus Station. The former station served route 150 (towards Chigwell Row) since 19 March 2016 by BRT East London Transit route EL2 (towards Dagenham Dock). The station has been replaced at present by new bus stops along the nearby road while the local council undertakes a construction project involving the building of 170 homes, a pharmacy and a new replacement bus station.

== Gallery ==
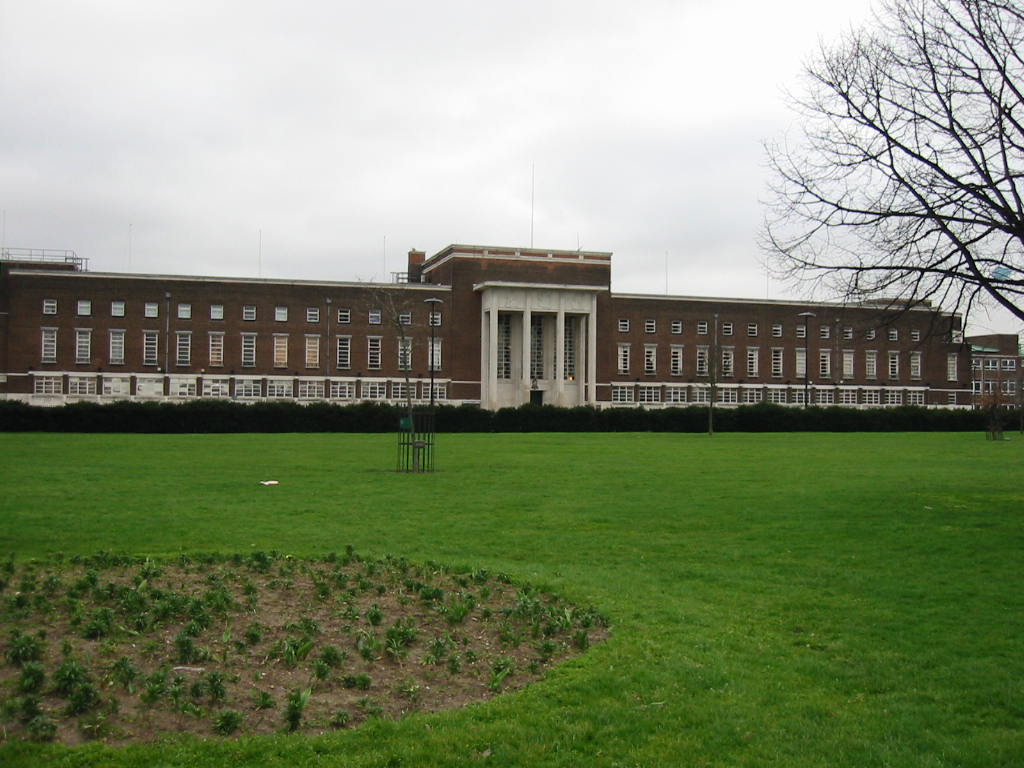
Barking and Dagenham Civic Centre.

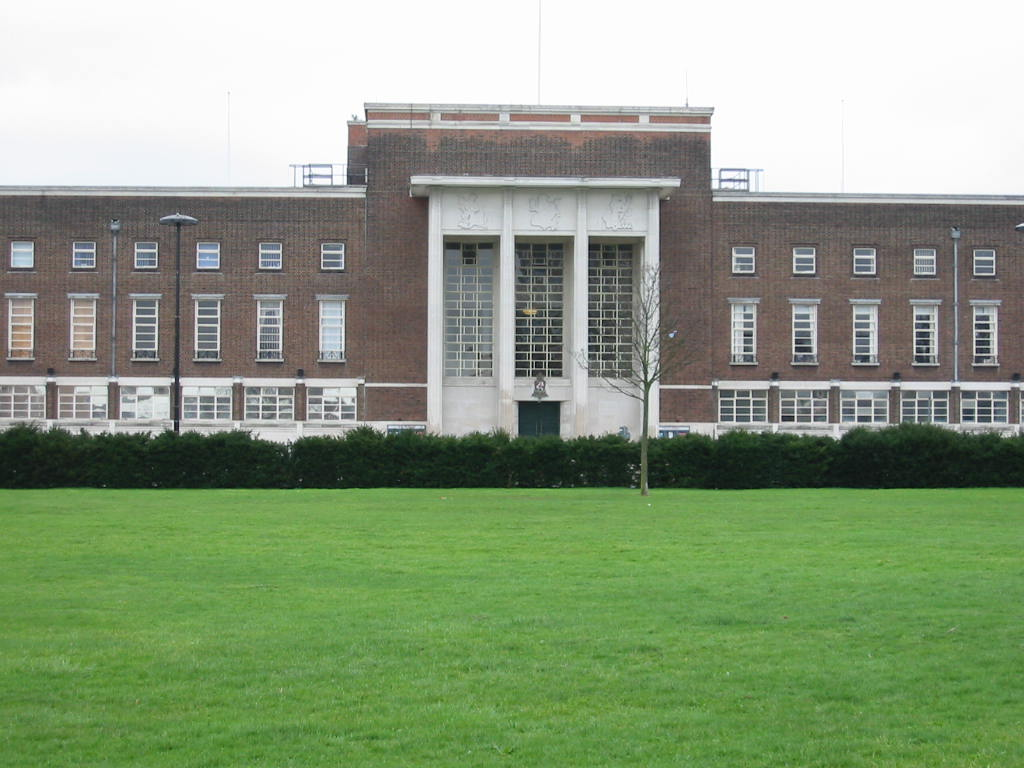
Close up of entrance.

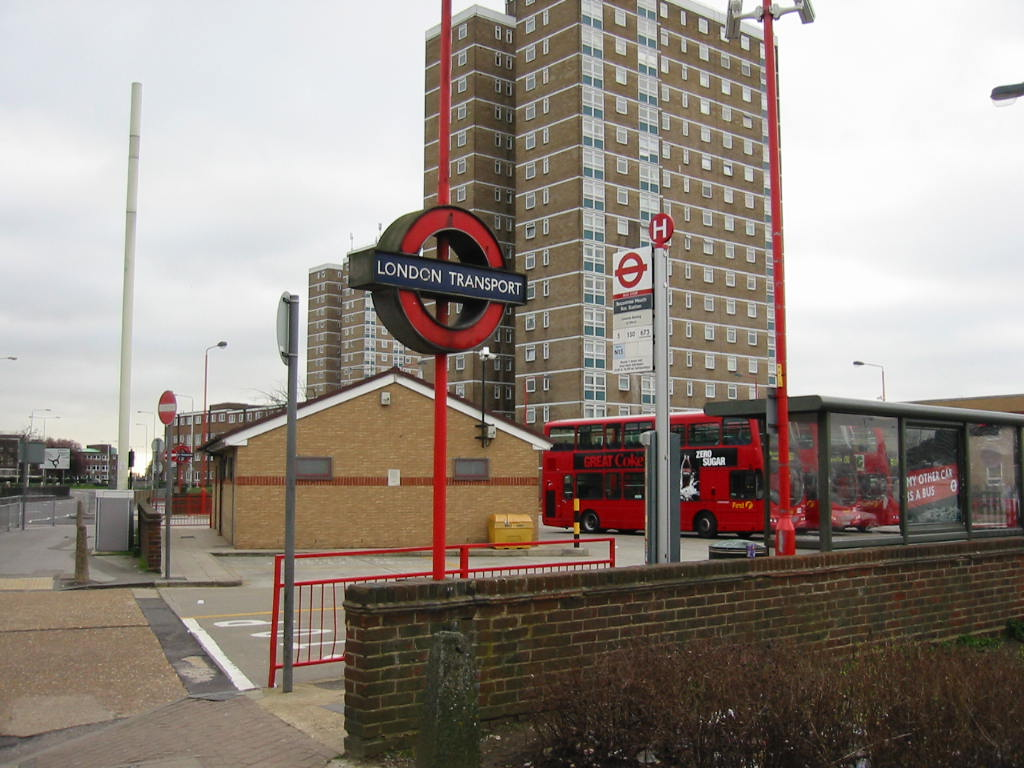
Becontree Heath Bus Station.

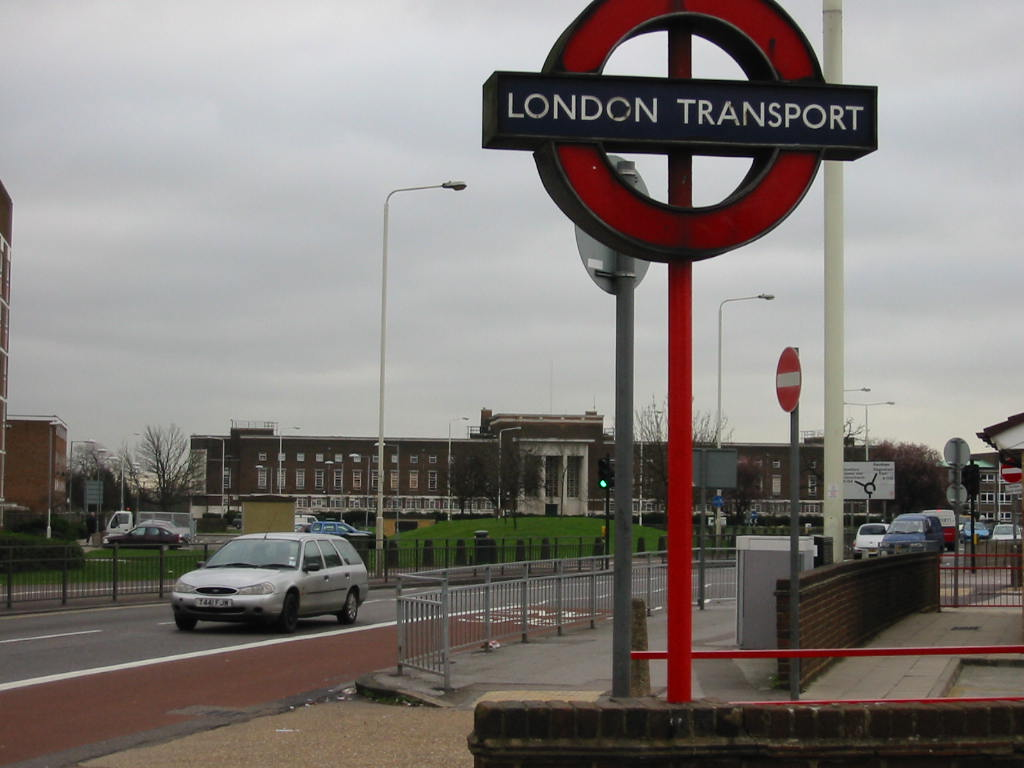
Becontree Heath Bus Station with Barking and Dagenham Civic Centre in background.
