= SeaCity Museum =

Museum in Southampton, England

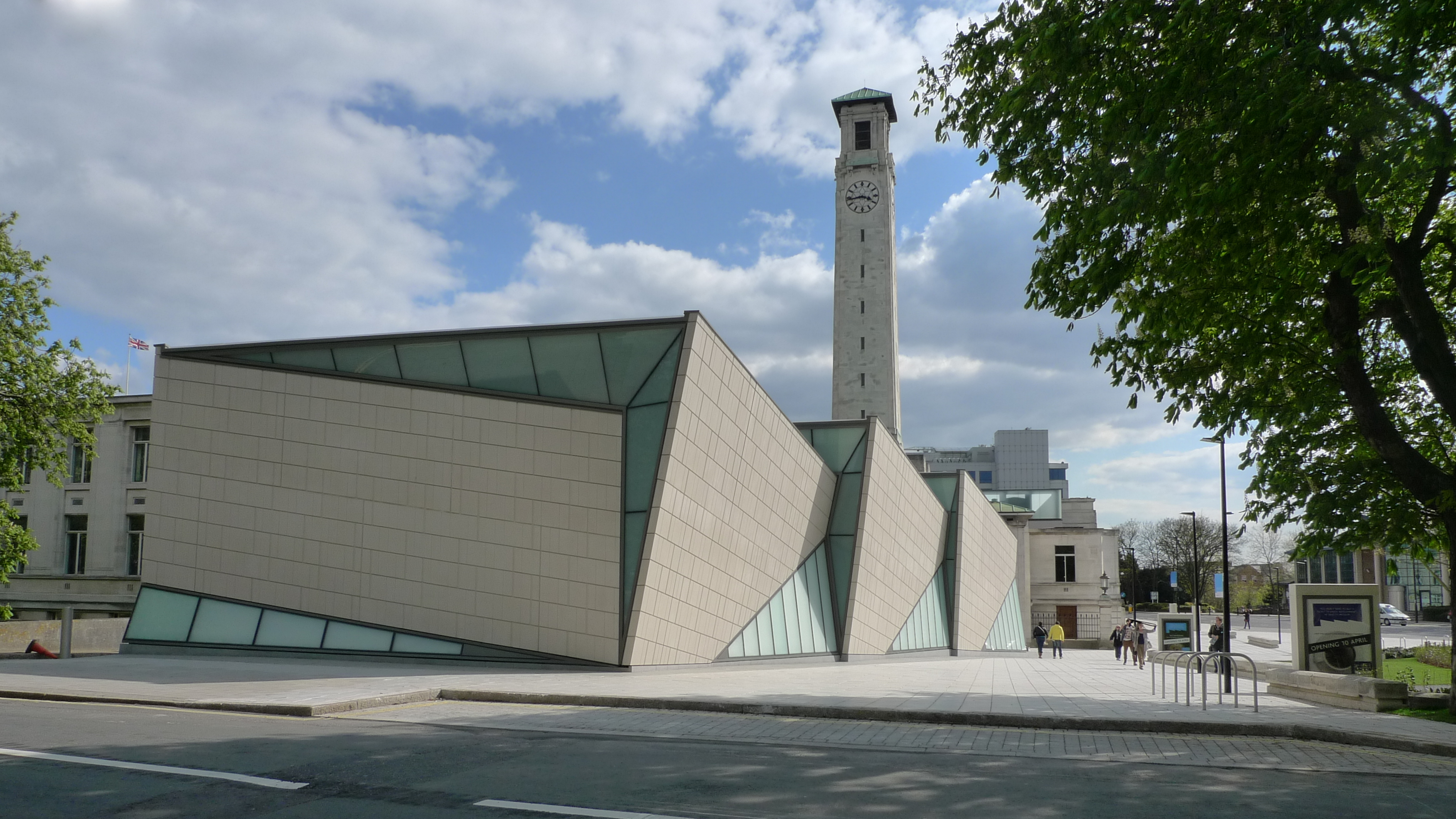
- SeaCity Museum, viewed from the North. The pavilion is in the foreground.

General information
- Location: Southampton, United Kingdom
- Coordinates: 50.908021°N 1.407664°W
- Opened: 10 April 2012
- Cost: £15,000,000

Design and construction
- Architects: Wilkinson Eyre (refurbishment and extension); E. Berry Webber (original building)
- Main contractor: Kier Southern

Website
- seacitymuseum.co.uk

The SeaCity Museum is a museum in Southampton, England, which opened on 10 April 2012 to mark the centenary of RMS Titanic's departure from the city. It is housed within a part of the Grade II* listed civic centre building which previously housed the magistrates' court and police station. The museum contains two permanent exhibitions, one dedicated to Southampton's connection with RMS Titanic, and the other to the city's role as gateway to the world. A third space for temporary exhibitions is housed in a purpose-built pavilion extension to the civic centre. Further phases of development may yet add to the exhibition space.

The museum was designed by Wilkinson Eyre with Kier Southern serving as the main contractor. The budget for the museum was £15M, approximately £5M of which came from the Heritage Lottery Fund, with Southampton City Council and Southampton Cultural Development Trust providing the remainder. The council had planned on selling works from their municipal art collection to fund the museum, but backed down after encountering significant opposition from both within and outside the city.

== Background ==
Plans for a heritage centre in Southampton began to emerge in 2002, with the city council's formation of the Heritage Working Group to explore options and to outline the way forward for such a scheme. In 2004, the following locations were shortlisted as potential sites for the then named "Story of Southampton" heritage centre –

- Lower High Street 50.897536°N 1.404339°W
- Mayflower Park 50.897836°N 1.408783°W
- Berth 101 at the Port of Southampton 50.900206°N 1.414747°W
- The former Vosper Thornycroft shipyard, Woolston 50.895617°N 1.382861°W

All of the shortlisted sites were deemed too costly and unworkable. Following these developments, in 2006 Southampton Police announced their intention to vacate their civic centre headquarters due to a lack of space. With the magistrates' court having left the building in 2001, this would leave an entire block of the civic centre vacant. And so the civic centre became a candidate to host the heritage centre, and by 2007 was considered the front runner.

Plans were unveiled for the civic centre heritage centre in 2008. The original plans included a 3-storey extension to the building, and a water feature running from nearby Watts Park, both of which were scrapped to reduce the cost by £10M to £28M. The project was split into two phases. The focus of phase one was to be Southampton's Titanic connection, and the Sea City name was attached. Phase one had a budget of £15M and a completion date due in 2012.

== Funding ==
Southampton City Council sought Heritage Lottery Funding towards the museum; it was awarded £0.5M in 2009 for the development phase, and a further £4.6M in 2010 for the construction.

To raise the rest of the £15M, in 2009, Southampton City Council proposed selling off works from their municipal art collection. The council selected two works to be sold, an oil painting by Alfred Munnings, After the Race (1937), (Note: After the Race at Art UK) and one of two bronzes by Auguste Rodin, either Eve (1880) (Note: Eve at Art UK) or Crouching Woman (1882). (Note: Crouching Woman at Art UK) The council believed that these works were not core to the gallery's focus on British modern and contemporary 20th and 21st century art. Due to space constraints at Southampton City Art Gallery, only 200 of the 3,500 works in the collection can ever be displayed there at one time; the council believed that the sale of the two works would allow space to be created in the new museum for the display of 100 further works from the collection. It was hoped that the sale would generate £5M towards the museum.

The proposed sale of the artwork had backing from the local paper, the Daily Echo, which had campaigned for three years for the deaccessioning of pieces from the "overflowing" municipal collection. There were voices of dissent from within the city however, in spite of Alec Samuels, the then Conservative council leader's assertion that, "If we don't sell some paintings we don't get a heritage centre." Councillors from opposition Liberal Democrat and Labour camps described the proposed sale as a "betrayal of public trust" which would damage the reputation of the city's museum. Alan Whitehead, MP for neighbouring Southampton Test described the proposed sale as an "outstandingly bad idea", which would discourage future donations and bequests to the city and destroy the national standing of its gallery. Labour politicians proposed borrowing funds as an alternative to the proposed sale, but the ruling Conservative faction dismissed this plan, arguing that it would lead to either cuts in front-line services, or increases in council tax, to cover interest and repayments.

Opponents formed the "Save our Collection" group to campaign against the proposed art sale; they protested outside the civic centre and handed a petition with over 2,500 signatories opposing the proposed sale to the council. Edward Chaney, then Professor of Fine and Decorative Arts at the Southampton Institute (now Solent University), appeared on BBC South and published articles warning of reputational damage to the gallery and the consequent threat to future bequests. Nonetheless, the council voted to proceed with its plans, and in September 2009, they formally approached Baroness Scotland of Asthal, then Attorney General for England and Wales to approve the sale. Criticism also came from the Museums Association which stated that the proposed sale would be in breach of the association's code of ethics as Southampton City Council had not fully explored alternate sources of funding. The Munnings forms part of the Chipperfield bequest to the city, over which the Tate held an advisory responsibility. They joined in the criticism, stating that "the sale of works acquired through the Chipperfield bequest to raise funds towards a capital project is not advisable and, indeed, not in the spirit of the bequest." The Art Fund, which had previously provided funding towards the acquisition of Bridget Riley's Red Movement (2005) (Note: Red Movement at Art UK) by the city, expressed concern at the proposed sale, wary that it would "set an uncomfortable precedent, stretching the sector's guidelines and effectively sanctioning the disposal of works of art from publicly-owned collections to support other areas of public sector cultural provision".

In November 2009, due to the strong opposition, Southampton City Council placed the proposed art sale on hold to re-evaluate their funding possibilities. By February 2010, the council had cancelled the proposed art sale. The council stated that movements in the property markets had allowed it to consider selling off assets that were previously seen as unviable for sale. The council also looked to other organisations to provide funding, such as partnerships with neighbouring Hampshire County Council through a loan of artworks scheme. And if these efforts were to fail, the council stated that any shortfall would be met through borrowing.

A charity, the Southampton Cultural Development Trust was formed in 2010 to raise funds towards the project. The museum further received a grant from the Department for Culture, Media and Sport in conjunction with the Wolfson Foundation, and another from the Garfield Weston Foundation.

== Construction ==
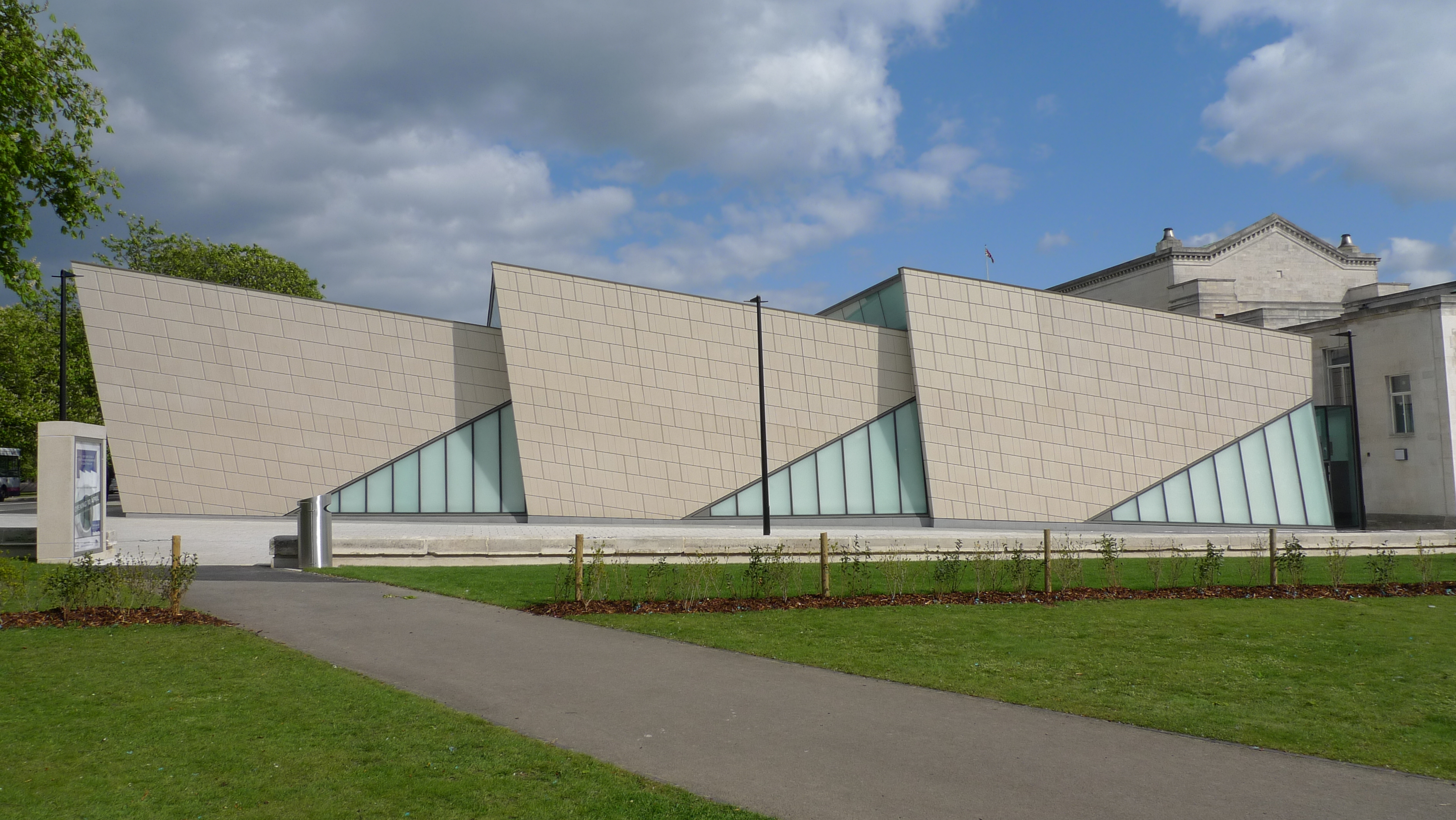
The pavilion consists of three interlocking bays

Southampton City Council appointed the design team in July 2009, naming Wilkinson Eyre as lead. A year later, Kier Southern were named as main contractor. Despite reservations over the appearance of the new pavilion, English Heritage gave their approval for the designs, and final planning permission was granted in September 2010. Work began in October. There were some obstacles to the build, contractors discovered significant corrosion to the original building's steel frame which had to be repaired. Adding the necessary security elements to cover museum exhibits in a listed building also proved challenging. Features from the original building were preserved in the design, the former prison cells were kept intact and used as toilet facilities, and a court room was preserved as an exhibition space.

By August 2011, contractors had reached the top of the pavilion, and a topping out ceremony was held. The pavilion was designed as three interlocking bays to negotiate the irregular site upon which it sits, which rises two metres from South to North. Stone aggregate was used on the pavilion's exterior to maintain consistency with the original civic centre building's portland stone exterior. Wilkinson Eyre described the pavilion as a "bold architectural addition" which signalled "the presence of a new important cultural attraction within the city". Oliver Green, writing for Museums Journal described the shape of the pavilion as echoing the "prows of ocean liners cutting through art deco waves". The completed museum provides 2,000 m^{2} of exhibition and learning space. The museum opened on time on 10 April 2012, marking the centenary of RMS Titanic's departure from the city.

Work on the SeaCity Museum attracted positive attention from industry bodies. The Institution of Structural Engineers shortlisted Ramboll's structural design work for their 2012 Structural Awards; Architects' Journal shortlisted Wilkinson Eyre and interior fitters 8build for their 2012 Retrofit Awards.

== Exhibits ==
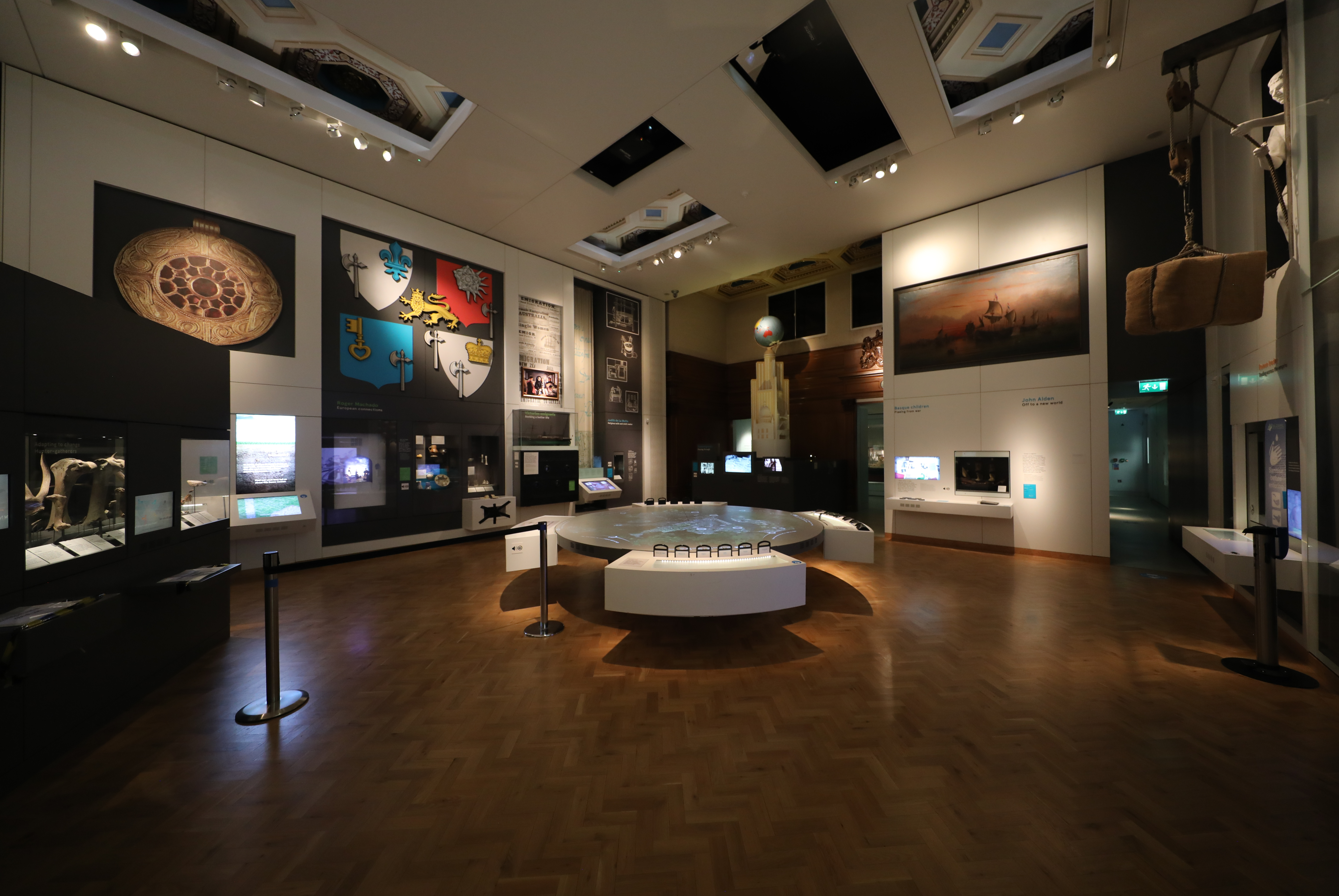
The main Gateway to the World gallery

There are three exhibitions at SeaCity, all of which were designed by Urban Salon. Two permanent exhibitions are housed in the former police station and magistrates' court.

- Gateway to the World examines Southampton's history, and its role as a hub for human migration. Exhibits include a one tonne, seven-metre long replica of RMS Queen Mary, rehoused from Southampton Maritime Museum. Both Southampton Maritime Museum and Southampton Museum of Archaeology closed permanently in September 2011 to allow their exhibits to be rehoused at SeaCity and Tudor House Museum.
- Southampton's Titanic Story explores the Titanic tragedy through the eyes of its crew, the majority of who listed Southampton as their address. A preserved court room uses audiovisual elements to re-enact scenes from the British inquiry into the sinking and to explore its ramifications. The civic centre clock tower, approximately the height of a funnel on the Titanic can be viewed through a roof light as visitors enter the exhibition, giving them an impression of the scale of the ship. The story incorporates audio recordings given by the survivors and features interactive elements allowing visitors to steer the virtual ship and to stoke its engines.

The pavilion plays host to temporary exhibitions. The first, to coincide with the Titanic centenary, is Titanic: The Legend which explores the public's enduring fascination with the ship through its portrayal in popular culture. The exhibition hosts screens playing scenes from films such as 1912's In Nacht und Eis and 1997's Titanic. Titanic memorabilia collected include Steiff "mourning bears", beers from the Titanic Brewery, jigsaw puzzles and many other such kitsch that SeaCity scoured the internet to find.

Catherine Roberts, reviewing Southampton's Titanic Story for Culture24 described the comparison between the height of the civic centre and the height of the Titanic as inspired. She praised the graphics for making the story digestible for children and adults. And while she mentioned that the motif of following several crew members through the story never quite pans out, she concluded that it was a well-conceived exhibition and that "there can be no better place than Southampton to remember both those who died and those who survived the Titanic's first and final voyage."

Oliver Green, writing in Museums Journal welcomed the new building, comparing it favourably to Southampton Maritime Museum's former home at The Wool House, which he described as being "completely unsuitable for telling the story of 20th century Southampton". Green praised the use of multimedia as "creative but restrained", and highlighted their careful integration with the museum's collections. He finished his review on a hopeful note, eyeing the still undeveloped spaces available in the civic centre building for further expansion. He concluded that it would be "a real shame if the project were to falter at this stage", and that further phases of expansion "must surely be good for the city and its future success."

Southampton City Council forecast that the museum would receive over 150,000 visitors per year, but these numbers were only achieved in the first year, and annual totals have subsequently fallen consistently. Over its first two years of operations income was £468 thousand (23%) lower than expected. Visitor numbers were 10 thousand lower than expected at 240 thousand. Visitor numbers have continued to fall in subsequent years raising concerns over ongoing funding and long term viability. The 2018 Pevsner Architectural Guide to Hampshire:South described it as "notably short of objects or artworks".
