= Southampton Guildhall =

Multipurpose venue in Southampton, England

O_{2} Guildhall Southampton
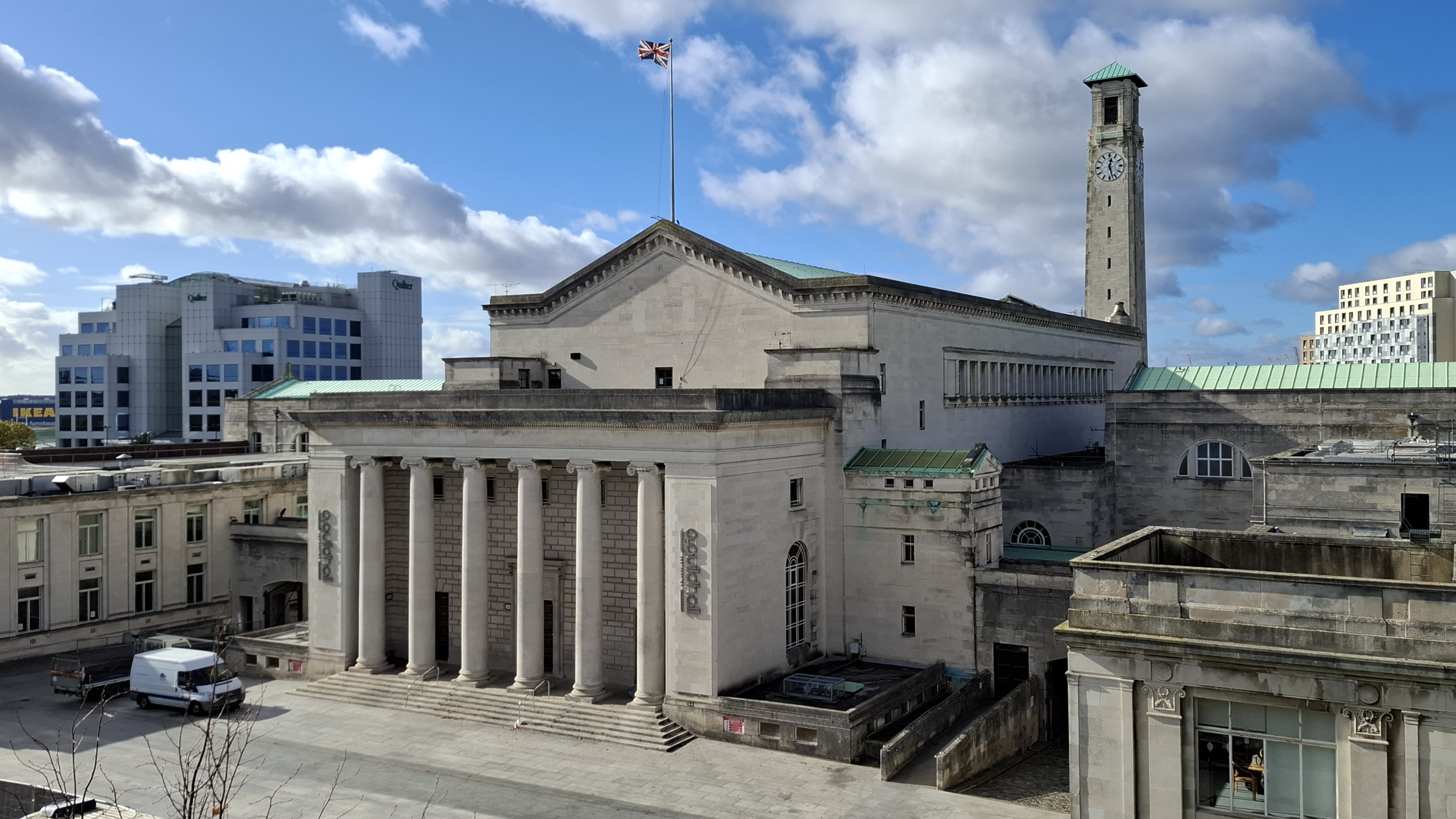
- Façade between the civic centre and city library

- O_{2} Guildhall in Southampton
- Former names: Southampton Guildhall (1937-2013)
- Address: W Marlands Rd; Southampton SO14 7LP; England
- Location: Civic Centre
- Coordinates: 50°54′29″N 1°24′22″W
- Owner: Southampton City Council (operated by Live Nation UK)
- Capacity: 1,749

Construction
- Opened: 13 February 1937

Website
- www.o2guildhallsouthampton.co.uk

Southampton Guildhall (branded the O_{2} Guildhall Southampton) is a multipurpose venue which forms the East Wing of the Civic Centre in Southampton, England. There are three venues in the Guildhall catering for various event formats: the Guildhall itself, the Solent Suite and a lecture theatre.

== History ==
The Guildhall, which was designed with a large portico with six Ionic order columns with pediment above, was intended to complement the rest of the Civic Suite and was opened by the Earl of Derby on 13 February 1937. Internally, the principal room was the main hall which was 143 feet (44 m) long, 71 feet (22 m) wide and 38 feet (12 m) high.

It contains a pipe organ, designed by John Compton, which was installed shortly before the opening of the building. The organ is unusual in that it has two distinct consoles: a classical concert organ and a theatre organ. The consoles share the same body of pipes which are housed in chambers above the proscenium arch. At some 4,000 pipes it was also the largest organ ever made by Compton.

The guildhall was used to accommodate French troops, who had escaped from France in June 1940 during the Dunkirk evacuation. During the Southampton Blitz in November 1940, the Guildhall was damaged by a bomb that fell at the rear of the hall causing damage to the rooms behind the stage and killing one person. Another bomb penetrated into the basement below the stage before exploding. The building was also hit by numerous incendiary devices. The Prime Minister, Winston Churchill, visited the guildhall during a tour of the city in January 1941 and it was used for high-level military conferences in spring and summer 1944 in anticipation of the Normandy landings which were coordinated from Southwick House.

A new sprung floor was installed in the main hall in 1955 enabling the guildhall to become a major music venue. Leading performers at the guildhall included rock acts the Rolling Stones in March 1964, the Who in October 1971, and David Bowie in March 1972 during his Ziggy Stardust Tour.

On 7 October 2013, the venue was renamed to the O_{2} Guildhall Southampton, reflecting a partnership between Live Nation UK and O_{2} Telefónica.

== See also ==
- Guild
- Guildhall
