= Civic Centre, Dagenham =

Municipal building in London, England

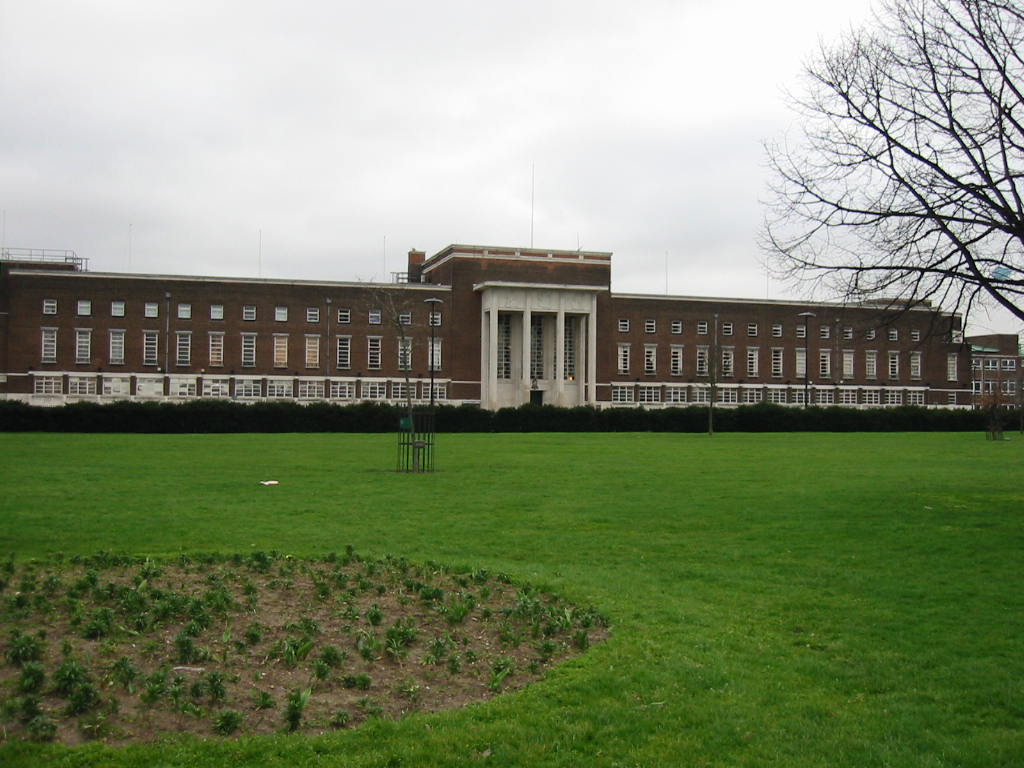

- Location within Barking and Dagenham

General information
- Architectural style: Modern architecture
- Classification

Listed Building – Grade II
- Designated: 24 August 1981
- Reference no.: 1064422
- Coordinates: 51.5603°N 0.15615°E
- Construction started: 1936
- Completed: 1937
- Opened: October 1937
- Renovated: 2003

Design and construction
- Architect: Ernest Berry Webber

Renovating team
- Renovating firm: Richard Griffiths & Hawkins Brown

The Civic Centre in Dagenham is a former municipal building in Becontree Heath, an area within the London Borough of Barking and Dagenham. The building was designed in the modern style by the British architect Ernest Berry Webber in 1936 and was opened the following year. The local authority, Barking and Dagenham London Borough Council, occupied the building until 2016 when it was vacated and leased to CU London, a new university, the following year. It was designated as a Grade II listed building in 1981.

== History ==
Because of the lack of available land in London, the Housing, Town Planning, &c. Act 1919 permitted the London County Council (LCC) to build housing and act as landlord outside of its territory. G. Topham Forrest was appointed as the chief architect on behalf of the LCC and between 1921 and 1935 the cottage estate, comprising around 26,000 homes, was developed. The area was to be called Becontree.

In August 1928, following implementation of the Dagenham Urban District Council Act 1928 (18 & 19 Geo. 5. c. cxvii), the council purchased 135 acres, with the intention of using the area as public space. Planners decided to designate the entrance to the area, since named Central Park, as the site of a new municipal building which was intended to be the work premises for members of the local authority.

Construction of the Civic Centre, which was undertaken by Allen Fairhead and Sons Limited, began in 1936 and was completed in October the following year. It was designed by Ernest Berry Webber, a designer of English municipal buildings, who the same year, designed Hammersmith Town Hall. He originally intended the building to be part of a complex which was to also include a fire station, library, shops, assembly hall and theatre, but the plan never came to fruition. The land on which the building was constructed featured lily ponds which became known as "blue lagoons" by the locals. The ponds were illuminated and filled with goldfish. The fish gradually died out, and in 1953 the ponds were filled in.

The Civic Centre's foundation stone was laid by Harry Snell, 1st Baron Snell on 11 July 1936. The building was officially opened on 16 October the following year by Sir Kingsley Wood who was the Secretary of State for Health.

== Design ==
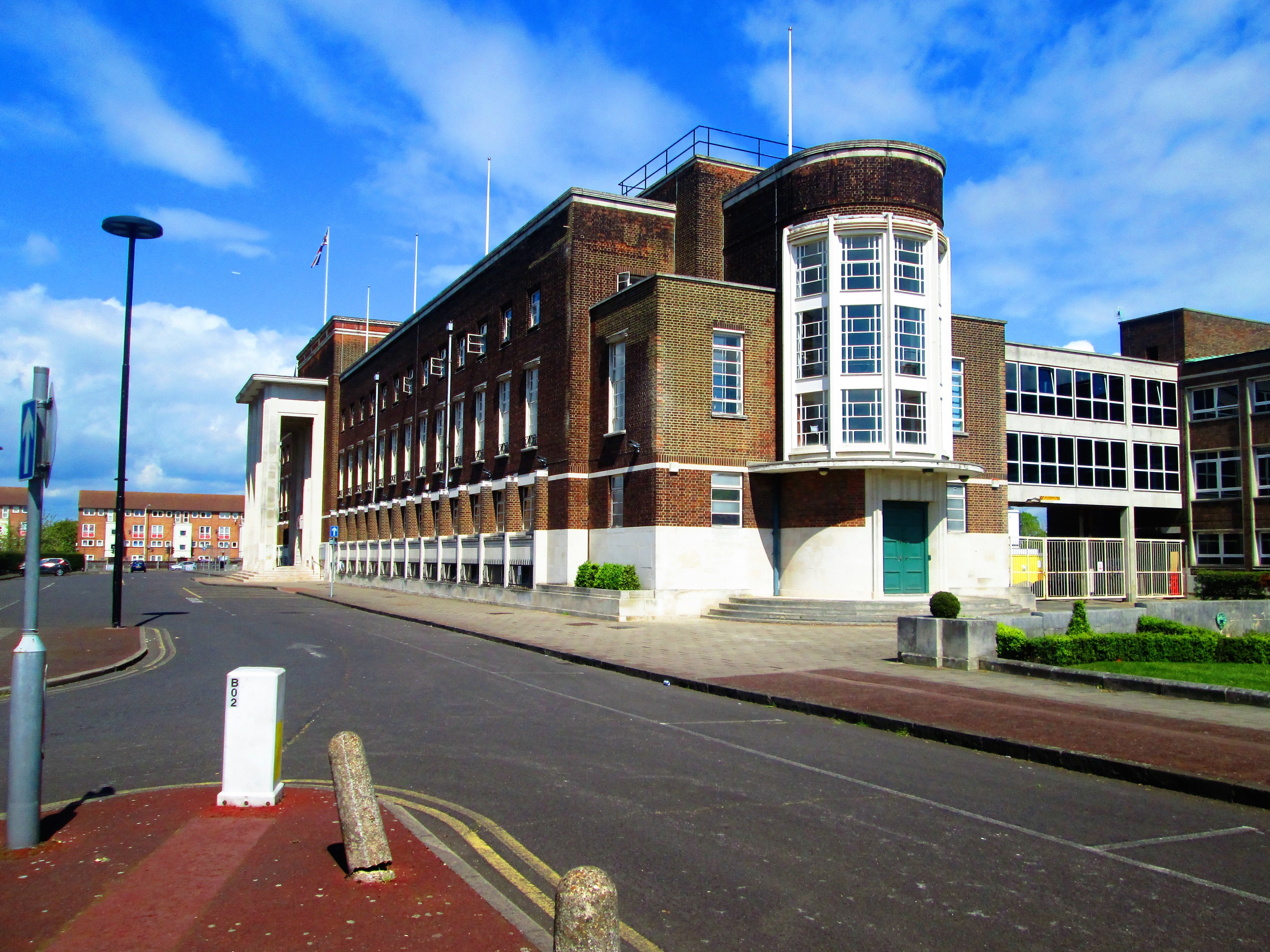
Side view, showing end windows

The Civic Centre is designed in the modern style. The interior features a stair hall which is made using champagne-coloured Botticino marble and the ceilings are decorated with art deco paintings. The internal doors are mostly mahogany with bronze fixtures. The Council Chamber is semi-circular in layout and is flanked by walnut-panels. The Mayor’s Parlour is panelled in Canadian betula veneer and sycamore. The building has a number of pieces of specially designed walnut furniture. Cherry, O'Brien and Pevsner, in their London: East volume of the Buildings of England series, describe the building as "Dagenham's best building by far and a good inter-war example of the traditional language of civic architecture absorbing a more go ahead modern style".

== Later history ==
In 1964 the local authority deemed the Civic Centre too small to house the 500 staff that they employed so built extensions to the south. It was designated as a Grade II listed building on 24 August 1981.

In 2003, the building underwent a major refurbishment. The work was carried out by the architectural practice Richard Griffiths & Hawkins Brown who removed all non-original fittings and restored the original stonework. The ceiling was stripped to reveal the original paint colours. The main Council Chamber was fitted with audio-visual equipment, air conditioning, a scene-setting lighting scheme, induction loops and more flexible furniture to allow different seating plans. Also upgraded and remodelled were the meeting rooms, members lounge, washrooms, kitchen and offices. Lifts were installed in the main foyer.

In March 2014, the building was threatened with closure because of the austerity measures imposed by the national coalition government. Its sale had been suggested as a means to find savings of £53.5million. A local petition was set up which was signed by 3,700 local residents. This forced the council to defer their decision pending further information. The Labour politician for Dagenham and Rainham, Jon Cruddas, led calls to retain the building as a result of overwhelming public support. Local residents called the building the "heart of Dagenham" and thought that it served a purpose that "cannot be quantified". In December 2015, the council disclosed their plans to scrap the sale and to allow the building to remain as the Civic Centre. A plan was proposed to turn the Civic Centre into a school, but in September 2017, CU London, part of the Coventry University Group, launched a new university in the Civic Centre, with permission from the council. The construction company Willmott Dixon was awarded the £4.5 million contract to modernise the building for higher educational purposes.

== Sources ==
- Cherry, Bridget; O'Brien, Charles; Pevsner, Nikolaus (2005). London 5: East. The Buildings of England. New Haven, US and London: Yale University Press. ISBN 978-0-300-10701-2. OCLC 1159868585.
