= William Capon =

English churchman and scholar

William Capon (1480–1550) was an English priest and scholar.

== Life ==
Capon was born at Salcott, near Colchester in Essex in 1480; he was educated at Cambridge University, graduating B.A. in 1499 and M.A. in 1502 (at the age of 22). In 1516 he became a Master of Jesus College, Cambridge and in 1526, aged 46, he was appointed Rector of St. Mary's Church in Southampton and subsequently also Rector of St. Mary's Church, South Stoneham. In 1546, aged 66, William resigned from his post at Jesus College and went to live in Southampton.

At the time, there was a chantry grammar school in St Mary's. These chantries were responsible for much of the little education in the town, but in 1548 the Chantries Act abolished the grammar schools. Capon believed that this was a severe blow to education, so in his will he provided £100 towards the "erection, maynetenance and fyndinge of a gramer scole" in Southampton. It was not until 1553, three years after Capon's death in 1550, that this wish was fulfilled and King Edward VI School, Southampton was founded by Royal Charter. His name lives on as the name of one of the houses at the school, named after him.

His brother John Capon Bishop of Salisbury served under Henry VIII, Edward VI and was one of the bishops commissioned by Mary I to persecute Protestant 'heretics'.

Academic offices
Preceded by Thomas Alcock	Master of Jesus College, Cambridge; 1516–1546	Succeeded by John Reston
