= Peterborough Town Hall =

Municipal building in Peterborough, Cambridgeshire, England

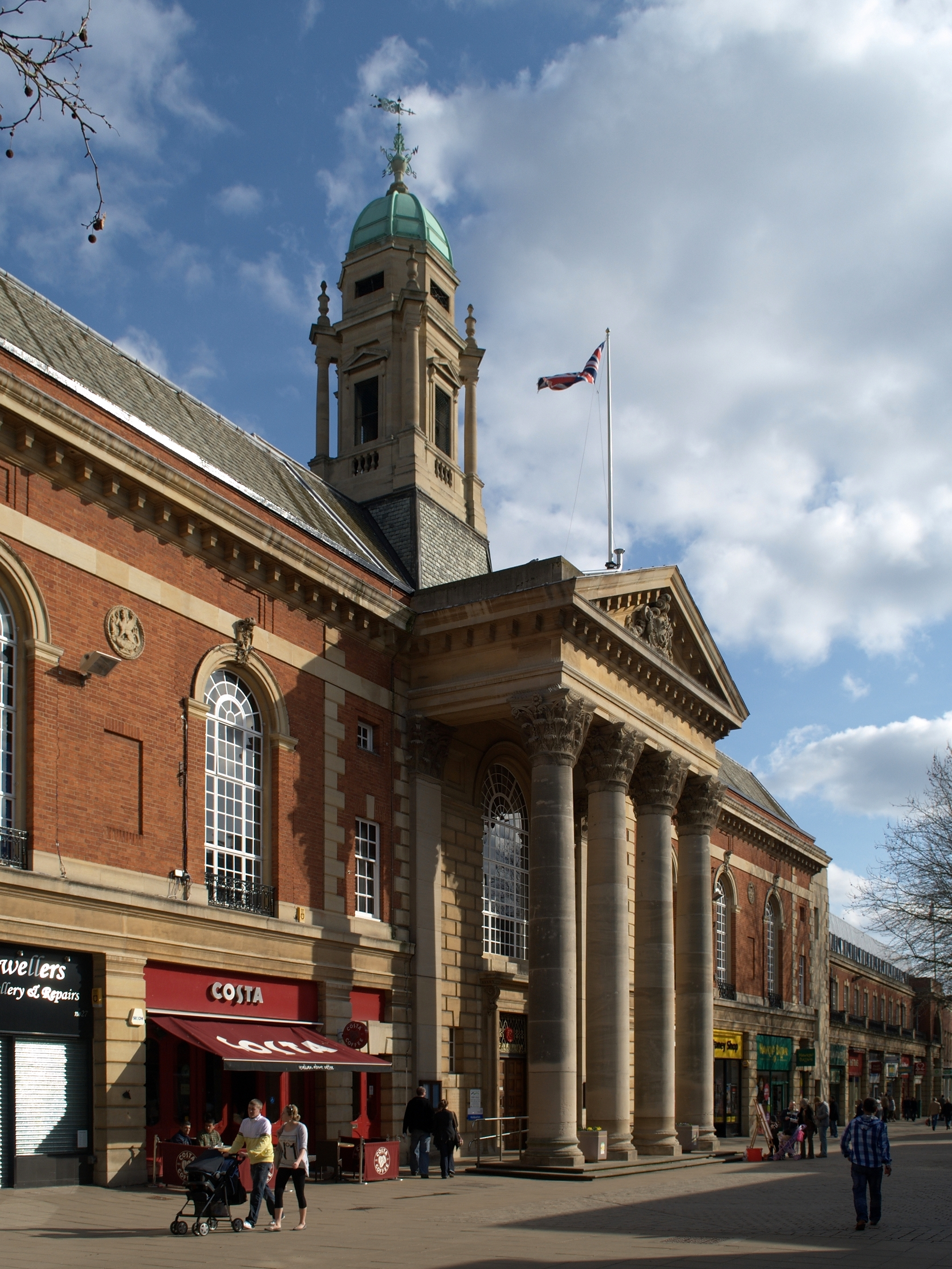
- Peterborough Town Hall

- Shown in Cambridgeshire
- 52.5714°N 0.2420°W
- Location: Bridge Street, Peterborough

History
- Built: 1933

Site notes
- Architect: Ernest Berry Webber
- Architectural style: Neo-Georgian style

Peterborough Town Hall is a municipal building in Bridge Street, Peterborough, Cambridgeshire, England. It is a locally listed building.

== History ==
The current structure was commissioned to replace the 17th-century guildhall in Cathedral Square. The whole of the eastern side of Narrow Bridge Street had to be demolished, doubling the width of the street, before the foundation stone for the new building could be laid by Prince George in June 1929. The new building was designed by Ernest Berry Webber in the Neo-Georgian style and built by John Thompson and Sons. The design included colonnades built out over the pavement in order to reduce the visual impact of a very long west facade. Four plaques were erected on the west side of the building representing jurisprudence, education, biology and industry & reward. The builder got into financial difficulties during the construction and the official opening was delayed until October 1933.

The Princess Royal met American servicewomen during a function held in the reception room of the town hall in 1944 during the Second World War.

The building, which had served as the meeting place of both the Peterborough Municipal Borough Council and of the Soke of Peterborough County Council, became the headquarters of the non-metropolitan district of Peterborough on the re-organisation of local government in 1974. In 2005, a 19th-century turret clock, which had originally been installed on the face of a jewellers' shop at No. 8 Narrow Bridge Street, was mounted on the west side of the town hall, very close to its original position. (Note: Since the demolition of the jewellers shop in 1930, the clock had been located in the Carnegie Library in Broadway.)

In September 2018 the council moved most of its officials to modern facilities at Sand Martin House, a refurbished Victorian railway building at Fletton Quays on the south side of the River Nene. The council chamber in the town hall continues to be used as the main venue for meetings of the council. In March 2020 work began on refurbishment works at the town hall, expected to cost £5.1 million, so that the Cambridgeshire and Peterborough NHS Foundation Trust could move into the vacant areas of the building in 2021.
