= Southampton Civic Centre =

Municipal building in Southampton, Hampshire, England

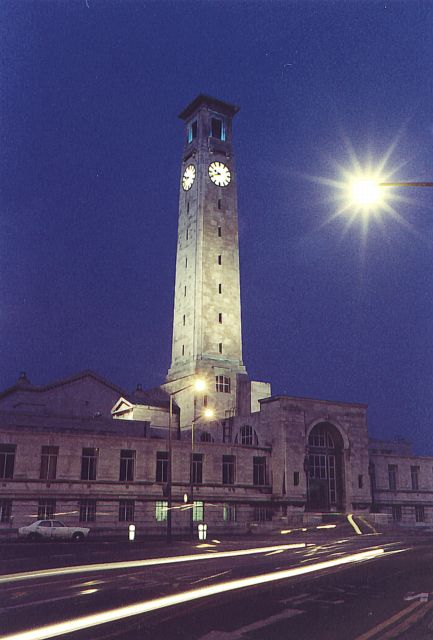
- Southampton Civic Centre

- Location in Southampton
- 50°54′28.78″N 1°24′23.46″W
- Location: Southampton, England

History
- Built: 1939; 87 years ago

Site notes
- Architect: Ernest Berry Webber
- Architectural style: Classical style

Listed Building – Grade II*
- Designated: 10 October 1980
- Reference no.: 1092036

The Civic Centre is a municipal building located in the Cultural Quarter area within the city of Southampton, England. It comprises offices occupied by Southampton City Council, the SeaCity Museum, the Guildhall, the Southampton City Art Gallery, and the city library. It was designed by the English architect Ernest Berry Webber in the Classical style in 1929 and constructed over a ten-year period. It was completed in 1939. Pevsner's Hampshire: South describes it as "the most ambitious civic building erected in the provinces in the interwar years". It was designated as a Grade II* listed building in 1980.

== History ==
=== Early history ===
Since the 1870s, there has been debate in the council over the housing of the borough offices: departments were scattered around the town, making co-ordination and timely response fairly difficult, with the old Audit House opposite Holyrood Church being totally inadequate. After extensive discussions about the proposed civic centre, Herbert Austin-Hall was appointed to assess a design competition for the new building. Following the competition, Ernest Berry Webber was chosen to design the centre in the Classical style with a budget of just under £400,000. The foundation stone was laid by the Duke of York on 1 July 1930.

The first block to be opened, known as the south wing, contained the municipal offices. Some of the material dug out during the construction of the south wing was used to fill in an old reservoir on Southampton Common as part of the process of converting it into a paddling pool. It was opened by the Duke of York, and his wife, the Duchess of York, on 8 November 1932.

The second block, known as the west wing, contained the law courts and the police headquarters. It also contained "Kimber's Tower", which is 157 feet (48 m) high and named after Sir Sidney Kimber, who had chaired the civic centre development committee. The block was opened by Viscount Sankey, the Lord Chancellor, on 3 November 1933. The tower contained a clock and nine bells, manufactured and installed by Gillett & Johnston of Croydon. As well as chiming the Westminster quarters, and striking the hour on the largest bell (which weighed 68cwt), the mechanism was designed to play the hymn tune Our God, Our Help in Ages Past; this initially took place at noon, during the opening ceremony, and was then repeated every four hours thereafter.

The third block, known as the east wing, contained Southampton Guildhall. Work on the Guildhall (the east wing) began in March 1934. The Guildhall was intended as a social location for municipal functions. The Guildhall was opened by Earl of Derby on 13 February 1937.

The fourth block, known as the north wing, contained Southampton City Art Gallery and Southampton Central Library. This began later than the others, and late alterations to the designs were required to incorporate a public library, that was not originally planned for. The expansion of this wing led to an increase in costs for the project, but the budget increase was approved by Parliament. This was opened in 1939.

=== Later history ===
During the Southampton Blitz, Hermann Göring, head of the Luftwaffe, targeted the Civic Centre. He remarked that the building appeared like a "piece of cake" from the air, and that he was going to "cut himself a slice". During a raid in November 1940 twelve bombs were dropped, including a direct hit on the Civic Centre with a 500 lb (230 kg) high explosive. The bomb (which hit around 14:30) penetrated to the lower floors of the art gallery killing 35 people, including 15 children, who were having an art lesson in the basement.

Following the implementation of the Courts Act 1971, the former assizes courthouse in the west wing became the venue for hearings of the newly designated Southampton Crown Court. The crown court moved to the new Courts of Justice in London Road in 1986. At the end of the 1980s the fountain from the city's rose garden was moved to a position outside the entrance to the art gallery. The magistrates' courts moved to a larger complex in The Avenue in 1999, while the police moved out of the west wing to new facilities in Southern Road in 2011. In 2012 the SeaCity Museum moved into the refurbished west wing complete with a modern pavilion extension.

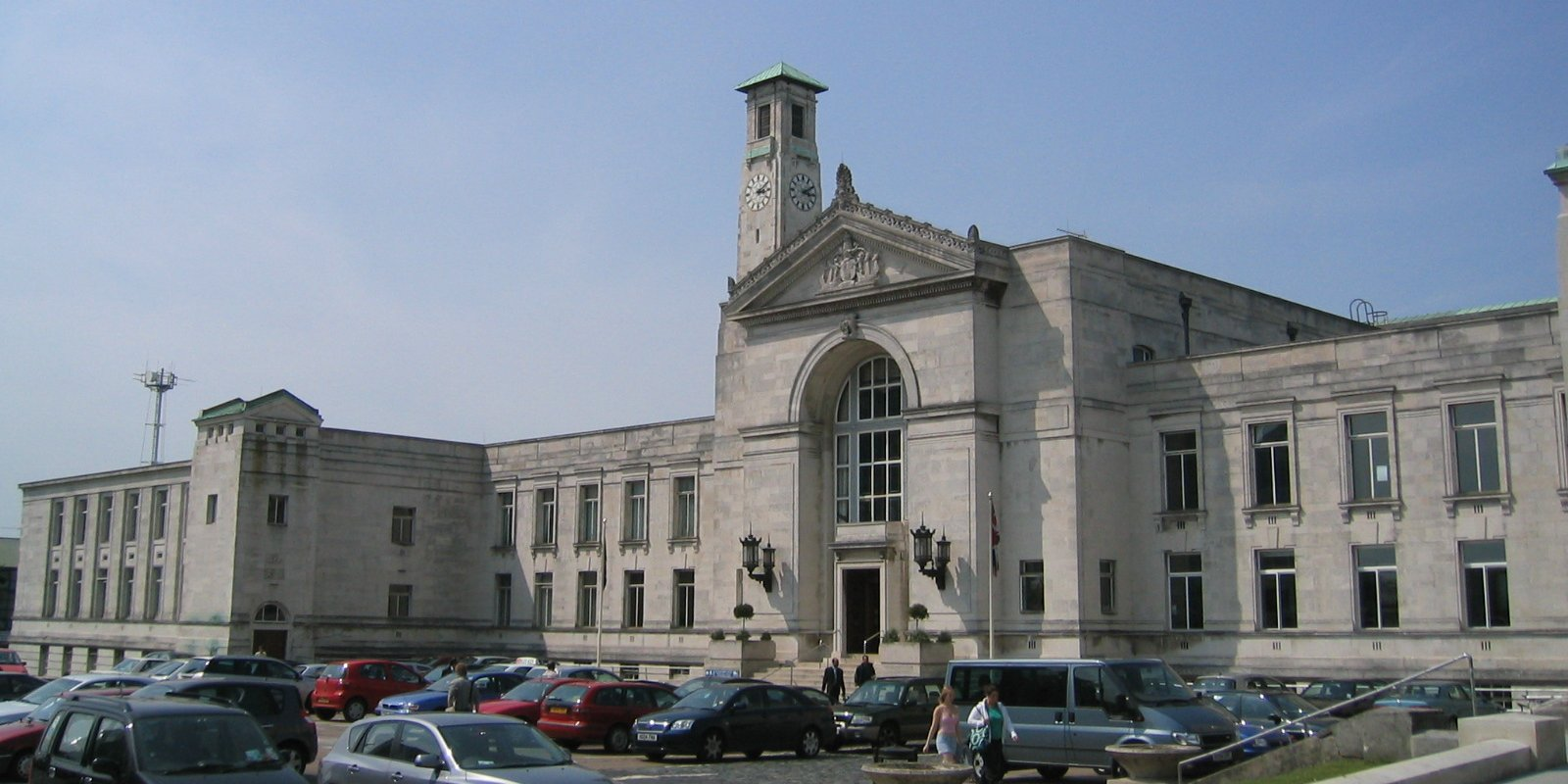
The south wing of the civic centre, containing mostly council offices

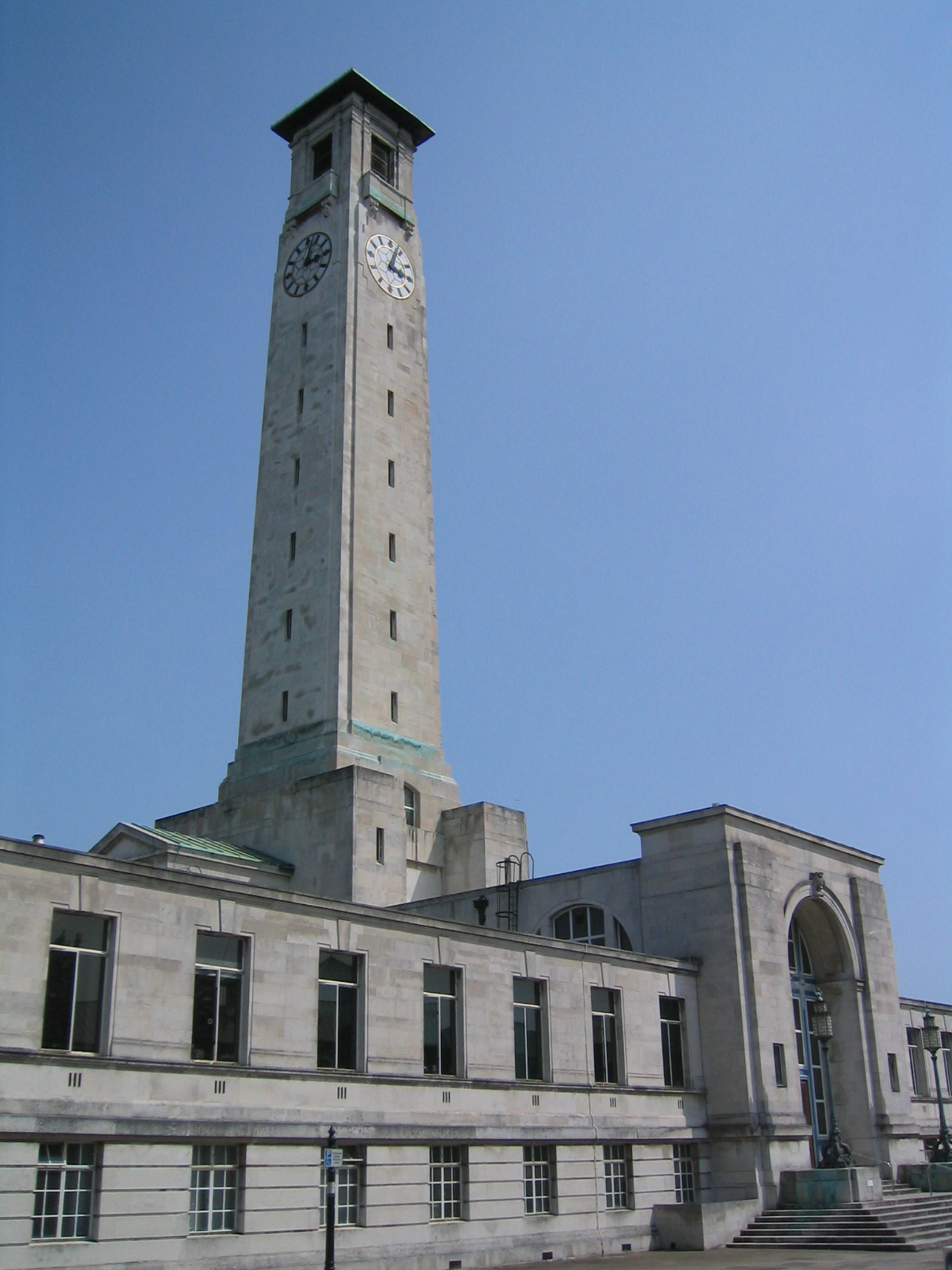
The west wing, originally courts, now hosting SeaCity Museum, and the monumental clock tower also holding many council offices

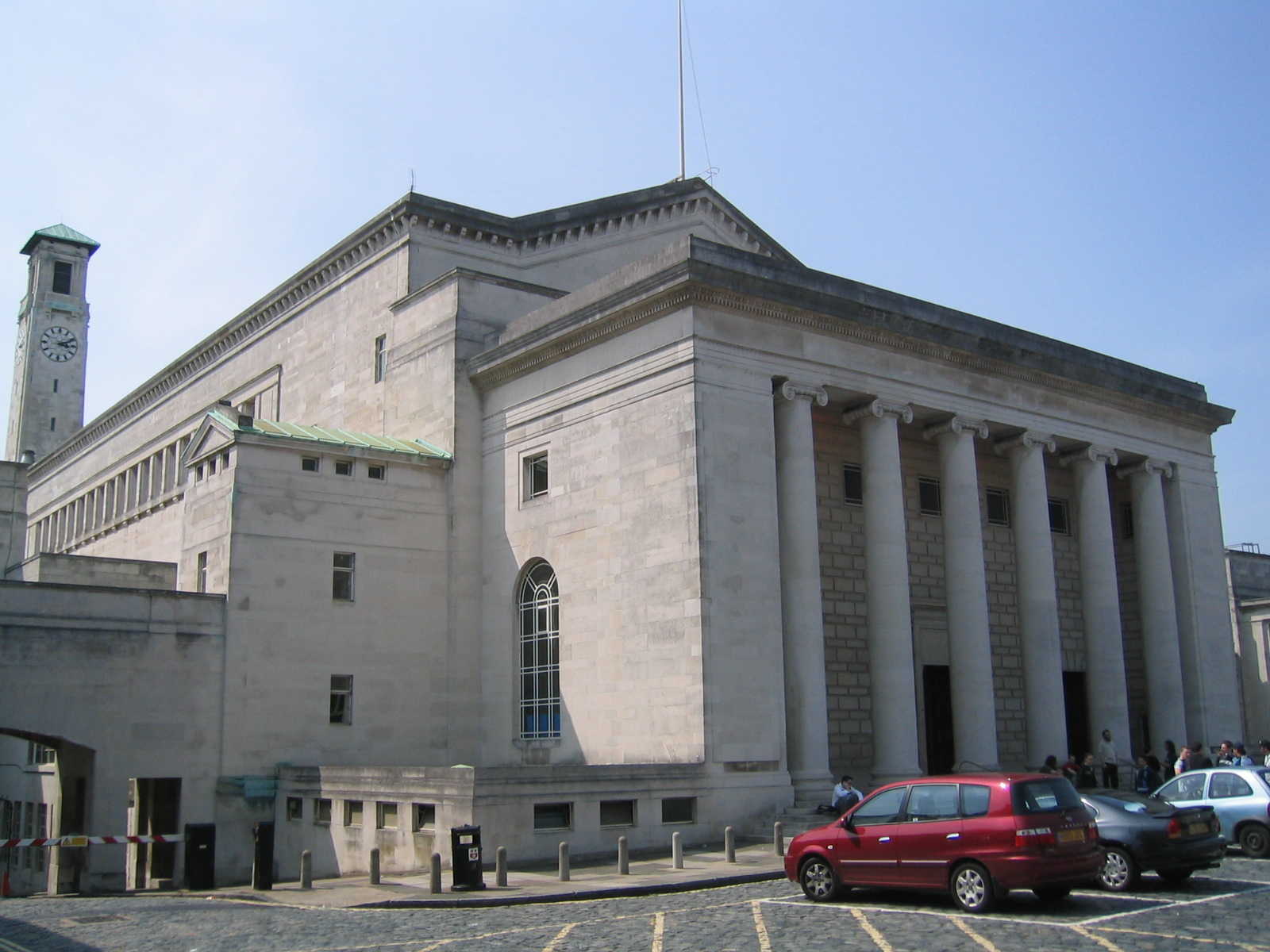
The Guildhall (east wing), with colonnaded façade

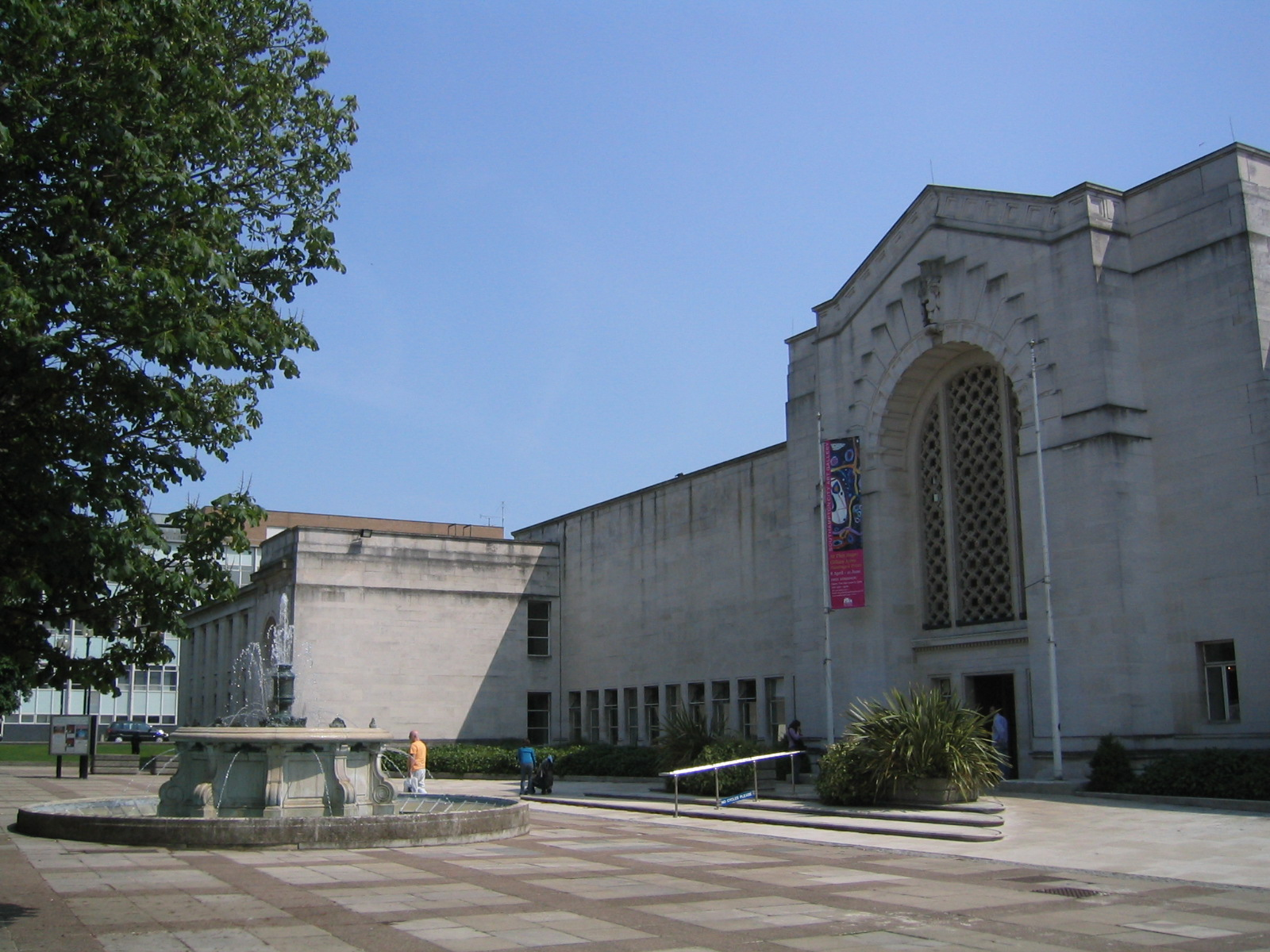
The north wing, hosting the art gallery and library
