= Ernest Berry Webber =

British architect

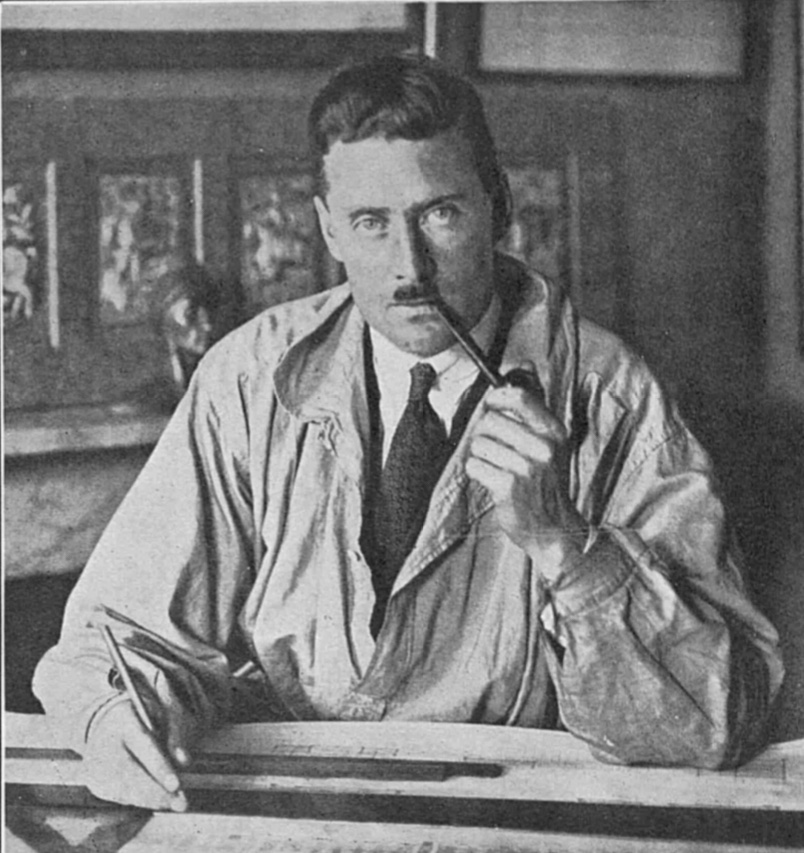
- Born: 29 April 1896; Walworth, London
- Died: 19 December 1963 (aged 67); Brighton, Sussex
- Occupation: Architect
- Buildings: Southampton Civic Centre; Dagenham Civic Centre; Hammersmith Town Hall; King Edward VI School, Southampton

Ernest Berry Webber, FRIBA (29 April 1896 – 19 December 1963) was an English architect, surveyor and town planner best known for his designs of municipal buildings, including those in Southampton in Hampshire, and Dagenham and Hammersmith, both in London.

Born in London, and after attending the London School of Building, Webber studied under Arthur Beresford Pite and then became articled to the architect Robert Atkinson. During the war years, Webber moved to the office of Vincent Harris, a prolific designer of public buildings. Webber's work for Harris involved entering the practice into architectural competitions by undertaking urban planning drafts and designs of municipal buildings.

In 1925, aged 29, Webber won a competition to design a new art gallery and museum in Manchester, to be constructed on the site now occupied by Piccadilly Gardens. The plans never went ahead, but his designs impressed his peers. His first major municipal design was the Guildhall Civic Centre in Southampton, which was built over a ten-year period, starting in 1929. Other civic centres followed, including the Civic Centres at Dagenham (1936–37), and Hammersmith (1939–40). Together with his municipal structures, his designs total at around 50 buildings, including schools, offices, museums and libraries.

Webber retired to Brighton in the 1950s where he died in 1963 aged 67.

== Early life and education ==
Webber was born at 47 St. Paul's Road, Walworth, Surrey. He was the youngest of three children, and the second son to Henry Webber, a shopkeeper, and his wife, Clara.

Ernest attended the London School of Building and studied under Arthur Beresford Pite. After leaving, he became articled to Robert Atkinson, and in 1914 he moved to the office of Vincent Harris, a prolific designer of public buildings. The war intervened and Webber served his four-year service in France. After the war, he resumed his apprenticeship with Harris where his work focused on preparing designs for competitions; he continued under Harris for 11 years.

== Designs ==
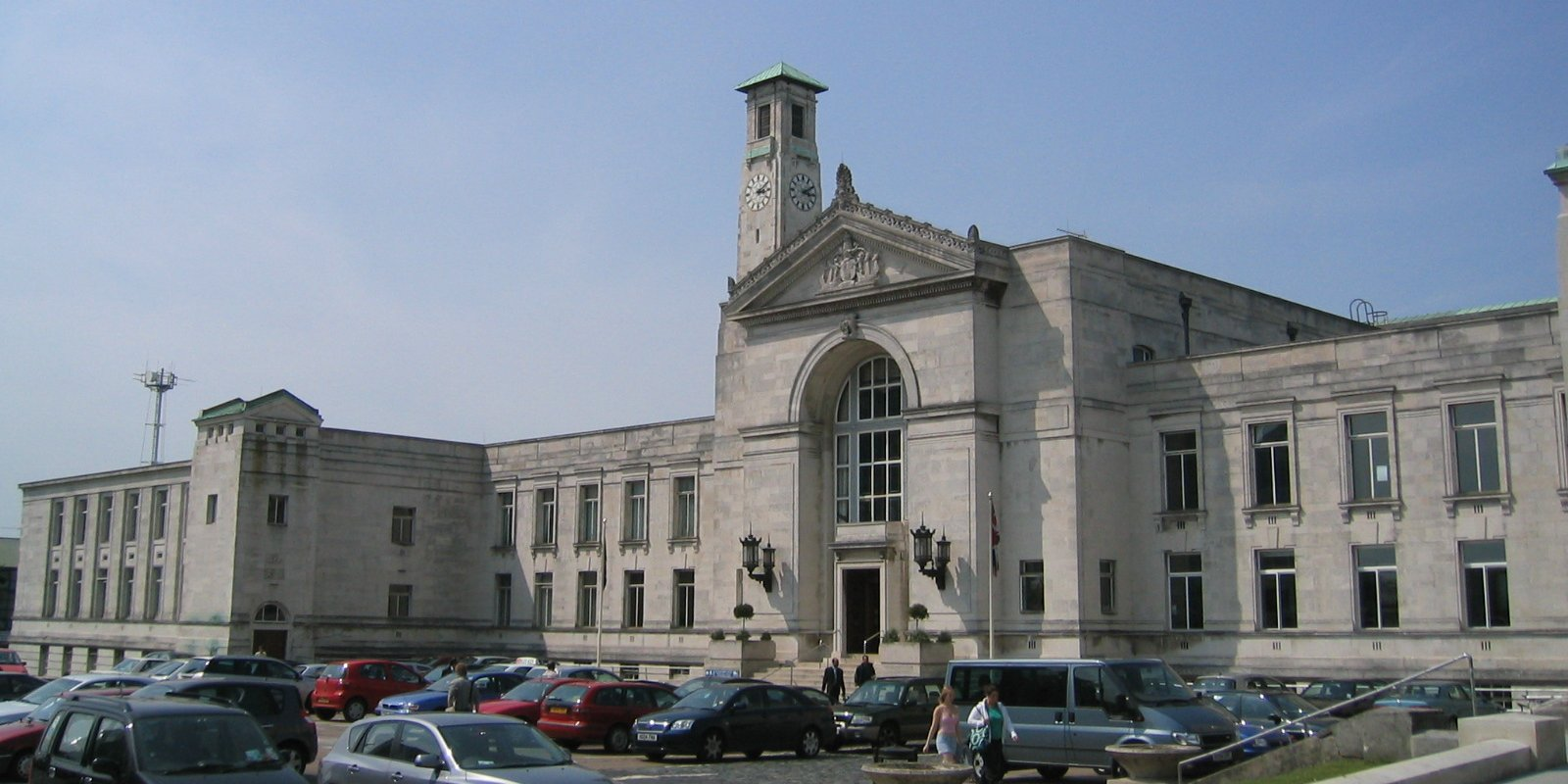
Civic Centre and Guildhall, Southampton (1929–39)

Webber became an Associate of the Royal Institute of British Architects (ARIBA) in 1923 and was able to set up his own practise three years later. At the age of 29, he won a competition to design a new art gallery and museum in Manchester, to be constructed on the site now occupied by Piccadilly Gardens. The design would also have doubled as a memorial to casualties of the First World War. The competition, which had over 100 entrants, some of whom were already well-established architects, was held in 1925 by Manchester Council to fill the space left by the demolition of Manchester Royal Infirmary. A reporter for the Lancashire Daily Post listed the win as Webber's "first great success" and the moment when he jumps from "comparative obscurity to a position of high distinction in his profession." Despite the success, the project was cancelled due to the post-war financial crash and the Great Depression of 1929.

In 1929 Webber won a competition to design the Guildhall Civic Centre in Southampton, which required his relocation to the city as the construction period was to last for 10 years, which he was to oversee. It was built to a cost of £620,000 and completed in 1939. Pevsner's Hampshire: South describes the guildhall as "the most ambitious civic building erected in the provinces in the interwar years". The building was designated as a Grade II* listed building in 1980. Alongside this, he completed the new King Edward VI School, also in the city.

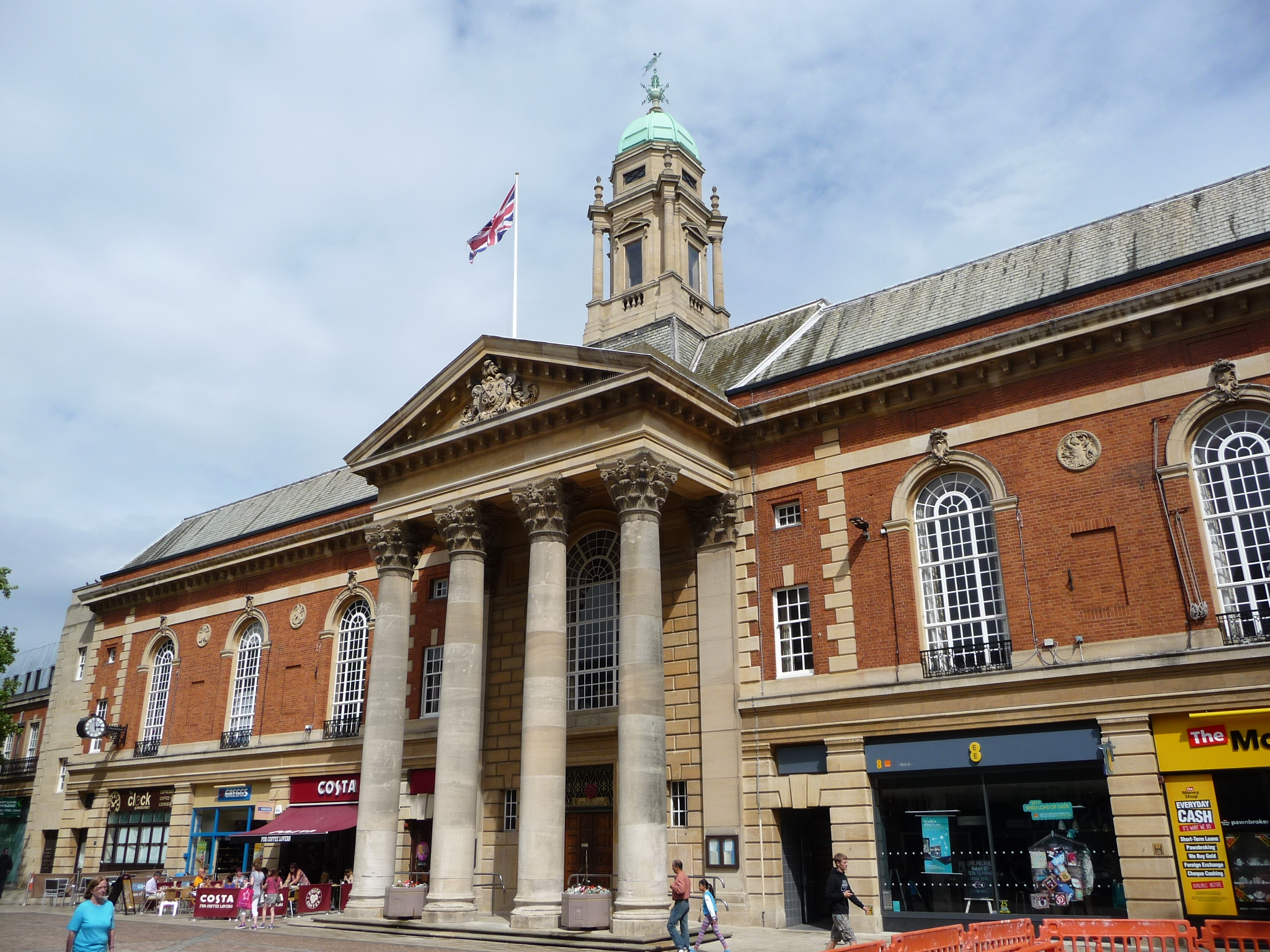
Peterborough Town Hall (1929–33)

In 1928 Webber won a competition to design Peterborough Town Hall. The foundation stone was laid in June 1929 and it was officially opened in October 1933. The building was designed in the English Baroque style. A reporter for the Architect and Building News described the design as being from someone who was "at the top of his form". The building was completed and opened in 1933. (Note: Nikolaus Pevsner, although appreciating Webber's efforts to place Peterborough Town Hall in its context, did not wholly approve of his chosen architectural style; "The choice of the style at so late a date may be deplorable, but the building is tactfully fitted into the street architecture of Peterborough. The architect has resisted the temptation to set his work up as a monument to compete with the cathedral".)

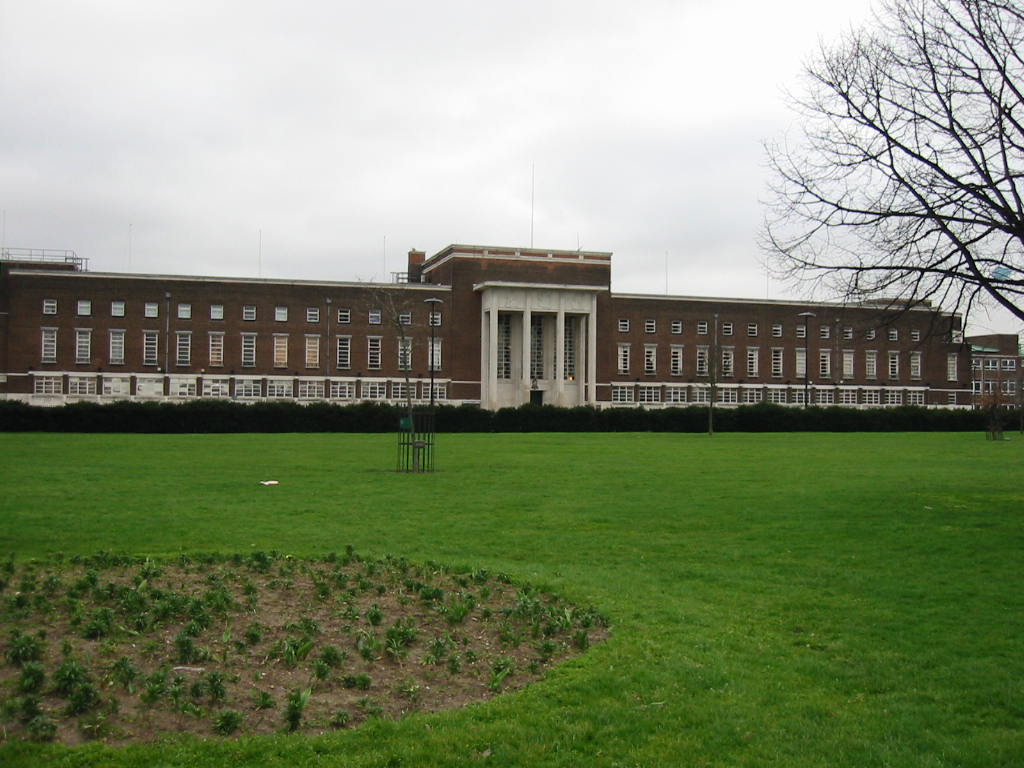
Dagenham Civic Centre (1937)

Webber designed the Dagenham Civic Centre, built from 1936 to 1937. The Civic Centre's foundation stone was laid by Harry Snell, 1st Baron Snell on 11 July 1936. Pevsner describes the centre as "Dagenham's best building by far". It is constructed in the Modernist style, which Webber also used for the adjacent fire and ambulance station. (Note: Webber's fire station was demolished and a replacement constructed on the site in 2016.) The Civic Centre was opened on 16 October 1937 by Sir Kingsley Wood. An extension was added to the civic centre in 1964 by Webber's firm after the architect's death.

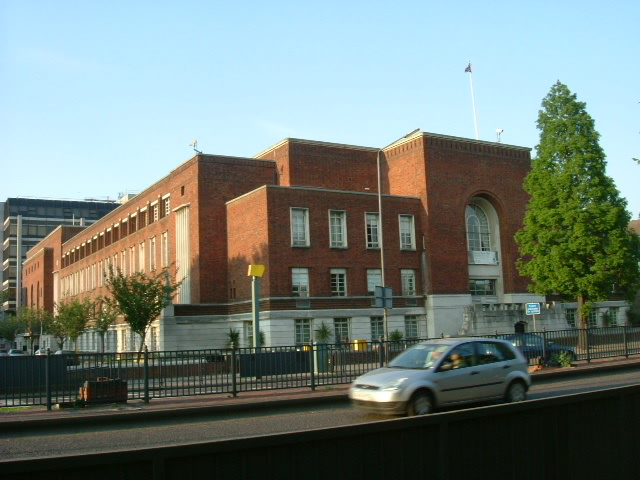
Hammersmith Town Hall (1939–40)

Also in 1936, Webber won a competition to build the parliamentary buildings in Southern Rhodesia. The following year, he undertook the designs for Hammersmith Town Hall in King Street, Hammersmith, London, which were completed in 1939. Pevsner calls the town hall "an unfortunate building", regretting both the loss of the "picturesque character" of the area which occurred as a result of its construction, and the "ill-judged" extensions of the 1970s. It became a Grade II listed building, together with the Civic Centre in Dagenham, in 1981.

Webber was appointed by the Royal Navy as the consulting architect for improvements to their barracks, HMNB Portsmouth and HMNB Devonport, in 1947.

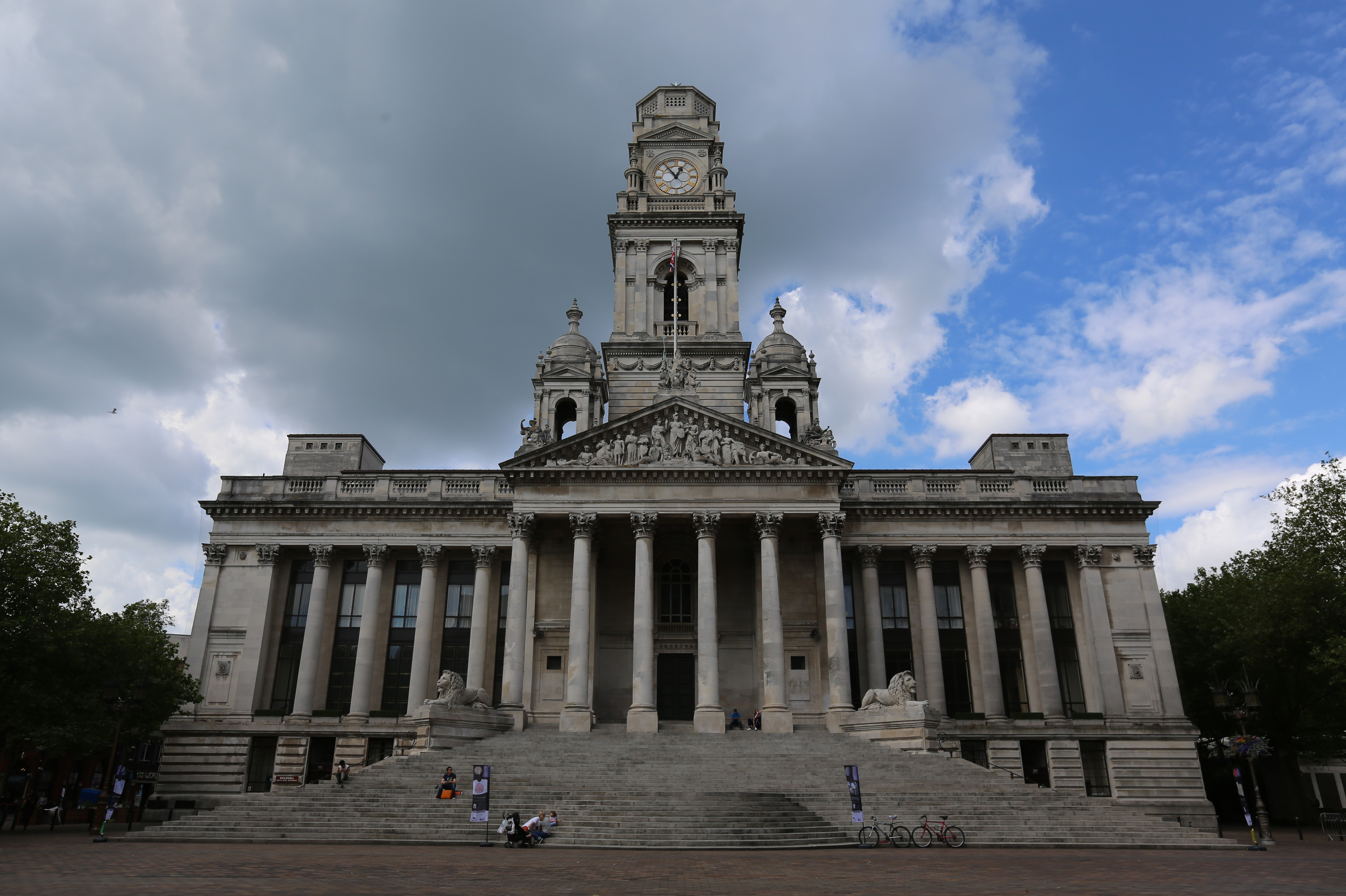
Portsmouth Guildhall, rebuilt by Webber in the 1950s.

In 1955 Webber undertook a £1.5million rebuild of the Portsmouth Guildhall, which had received substantial bomb damage during the war. It was reopened by Elizabeth II on 10 June 1959.

== Personal life ==
Webber married Gladys née Bellis Roberts (1896–1984) on 22 November 1922 at St Mary and Holy Trinity Church in Stratford. They had a son named Geoffrey. On 25 June 1929 Webber was given the Freedom of the City of London. He was a president of the Eccentric Club during the 1940s, and in 1960 he was made a companion of the entertainment charity, the Grand Order of Water Rats.

Webber retired to Brighton in the 1950s. He was taken ill at his house, 2 Arundel Terrace, and died shortly after at the Royal Sussex County Hospital on 19 December 1963. His probate was set at £18,611 (£490,000 in 2023 adjusted for inflation).

== Sources ==
- Cherry, Bridget; Pevsner, Nikolaus (2002). London 3: North West. The Buildings of England. New Haven, US and London: Yale University Press. ISBN 978-0-300-09652-1. OCLC 983761260.
- Cherry, Bridget; O'Brien, Charles; Pevsner, Nikolaus (2007). London 5: East. The Buildings of England. New Haven, US and London: Yale University Press. ISBN 978-0-300-10701-2. OCLC 983755807.
- Groombridge, Garth (2017). Portsmouth in 50 buildings. Stroud, UK: Amberley Publishing. ISBN 978-1-445-66406-4.
- Neal, Peter (2014). Story of Southampton. Stroud, UK: The History Press. ISBN 978-0-750-95861-5.
- O'Brien, Charles; Pevsner, Nikolaus (2014). Bedfordshire, Huntingdonshire and Peterborough. The Buildings of England. New Haven, US and London: Yale University Press. ISBN 978-0-300-20821-4. OCLC 881612533.
- O'Brien, Charles; Bailey, Bruce; Pevsner, Nikolaus; Lloyd, David W. (2018). Hampshire: South. The Buildings of England. New Haven, US and London: Yale University Press. ISBN 978-0-300-18507-2. OCLC 1078192100.
