= Hammersmith Town Hall =

Municipal building in London, England

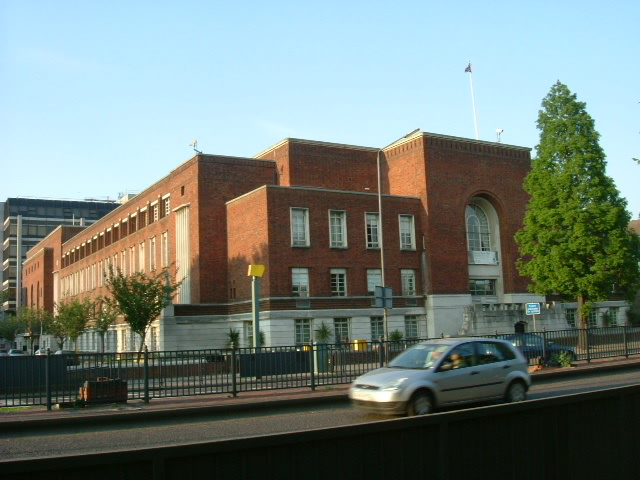
- Hammersmith Town Hall in 2008

- Shown in Hammersmith and Fulham
- 51°29′30″N 00°14′03″W
- Location: King Street, Hammersmith, London, England

History
- Built: 1939

Site notes
- Architect: Ernest Berry Webber
- Architectural style: Neo-Georgian style

Listed Building – Grade II
- Designated: 19 March 1981
- Reference no.: 1079785

Hammersmith Town Hall is a municipal building on King Street in Hammersmith. The town hall, which is the headquarters of Hammersmith and Fulham London Borough Council, is a Grade II listed building.

== History ==
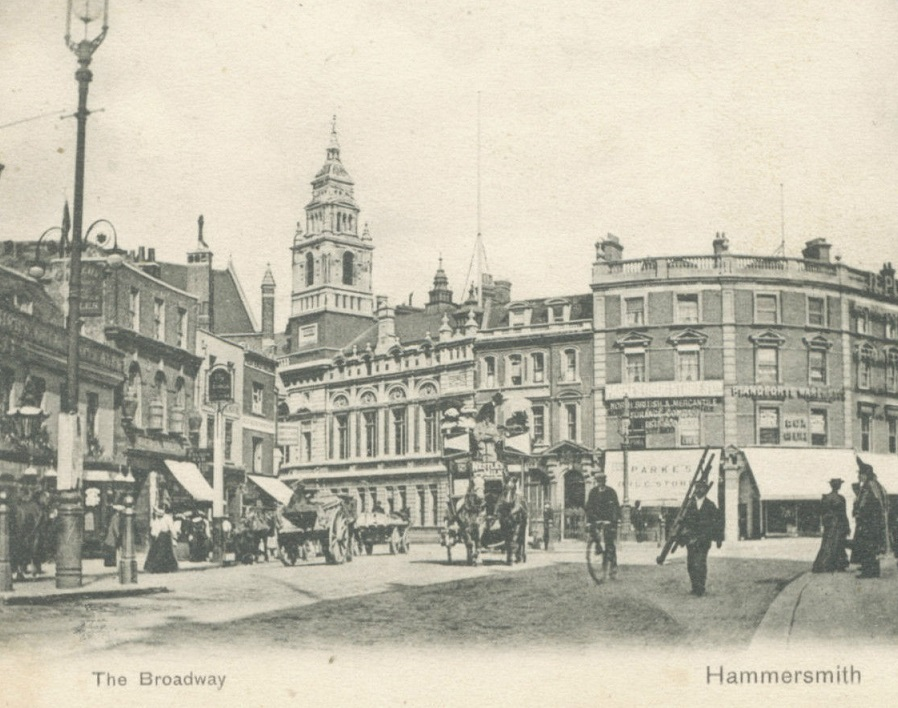
The earlier town hall in Hammersmith Broadway (with the tower)

The building was commissioned to replace an earlier town hall in Hammersmith Broadway which had been designed by J. Henry Richardson in the Italianate style, built by George Wimpey and completed for the Hammersmith Vestry in 1897. It had become the headquarters of the Metropolitan Borough of Hammersmith in 1900. After the old town hall had become inadequate for the council's needs, civic leaders decided to build a new town hall: the site chosen for the new building had previously been occupied by part of the route of the Hammersmith Creek which had to be placed in a culvert to enable the new building to proceed.

The foundation stone for the new building was laid by the chairman of London County Council, Ewart Culpin, on 2 July 1938. The new building, which was designed by Ernest Berry Webber in a Neo-Georgian style, was completed in 1939. The design involved a symmetrical main frontage with nine bays facing onto the Great West Road; the central section featured a perron, leading up to a doorway, which is now blocked up, on the first floor; there was a recessed arch containing a tall round-headed window on the second floor. On the walls of the perron there were large carved heads depicting Old Father Thames which were designed by George Alexander. Internally, the principal rooms are the council chamber and the mayor's parlour which are in the southern part of the main building and the assembly hall which is in the northern part of the main building.

The building suffered bomb damage during the Blitz in 1940 and again in 1944, but was repaired in time for the victory celebrations in 1945. The foyer was redecorated with murals of riverside scenes by Alfred Daniels and John Titcheli in 1956.

The town hall became the local seat of government of the enlarged London Borough of Hammersmith and Fulham in 1965. A six-storey extension located to the north of the main building was designed by the borough architect, Dennis Browne, in the brutalist style, and completed in 1975. In November 2019 work began to demolish the extension with a view to creating a civic campus with a public square, a cinema and new residential space. The new civic campus, which was designed by Rogers Stirk Harbour + Partners, opened in summer 2026.
