= Dagenham East rail crash =

1958 rail accident in London

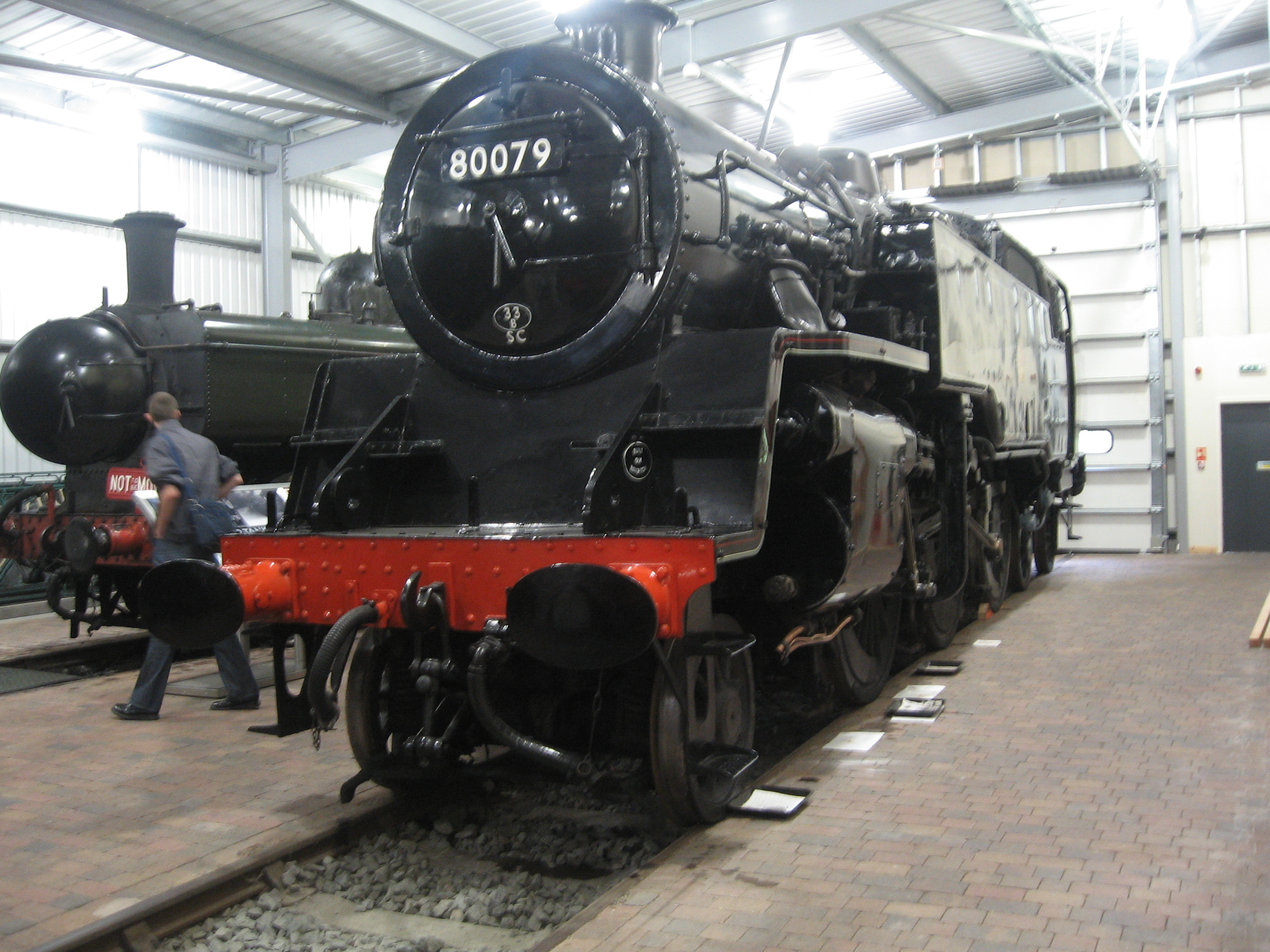
- BR Standard Class 4 2-6-4T in preservation
- Interactive map of the location

Details
- Date: 30 January 1958; 19:34
- Location: Dagenham; 0.5 km (0.31 mi) W from Dagenham East station
- Coordinates: 51°32′32″N 0°09′20″E
- Country: England
- Line: London, Tilbury and Southend
- Operator: Eastern Region
- Owner: British Railways
- Incident type: Collision in fog
- Cause: Signal passed at danger

Statistics
- Trains: 2
- Vehicles: BR Standard Class 4 2-6-4T; LMS 2-Cylindered Stanier 2-6-4T
- Passengers: ~1,000
- Deaths: 10 passengers
- Injured: 89 passengers; 4 railway staff
- Damage: 1 coach destroyed

The Dagenham East rail crash was a fatal railway accident that occurred on the evening of 30 January 1958 in Dagenham, England. It was a rear-end collision of two steam trains caused by a signal passed at danger in dense fog on the London, Tilbury and Southend line in the Eastern Region of British Railways. With 10 fatalities and over 90 injuries, it was the worst disaster on the line. Coming soon after the December 1957 Lewisham rail crash in similar conditions, there was national attention to the incident and concerns were raised about railway safety. The circumstances that led to the accident were eliminated by the introduction of colour-light signalling as part of the forthcoming electrification of the line.

== Background ==
The London, Tilbury and Southend Railway was opened through the site in 1885 with a station at Dagenham (Dagenham East after 1949). Two additional electrified tracks were added to the north of the existing lines in 1932 with a station added at Heathway (Dagenham Heathway after 1949). In 1958, these tracks made up the London, Tilbury and Southend line operated by the Eastern Region of British Railways. The section between Bromley and Upminster stations was four-track, paired by speed, with the northern "local" pair fourth rail electrified for London Underground trains. The southern "through" lines were for steam trains. The through lines in this section used semaphore signals and the Strowger–Hudd Automatic Warning System. On the evening of 30 January 1958, steam trains were leaving the London terminus of Fenchurch Street approximately ten minutes late and were travelling at reduced speed due to dense fog. East of Barking, trains were running around half an hour late.

== Collision ==
The accident took place between Dagenham Heathway and Dagenham East stations in dense fog at around 19:34 on Thursday 30 January 1958, during the evening peak period. The 18:35 steam passenger train from Fenchurch Street to Shoeburyness ran into the rear of the slowly moving 18:20 from Fenchurch Street to Thorpe Bay on the down through line. The trains had eleven coaches and carried around 500 passengers each. The BR Standard Class 4 2-6-4T tank engine of the 18:35 train, running 'bunker first' (with the engine back-to-front), destroyed part of the rear coach of the 18:20. (Note: The guard's compartment and three of seven passenger compartments of the last carriage were "demolished".) The last two coaches of the 18:20 train and the first coach of the 18:35, along with its engine, were derailed. There was wreckage on the up local electric line and a collision with a London Underground train was narrowly avoided.

== Aftermath ==
10 passengers were killed in the accident and 89 were injured. Four members of railway staff were also injured. Jan Leshynski, a surgeon from King George Hospital, performed a leg amputation on the guard of the first train at the crash site. Most of the serious injuries were taken to Oldchurch Hospital, where ten major operations were untaken within three hours. Fourteen casualties were cared for at Rush Green Hospital. There was a regional appeal for blood donations. The driver and fireman of the second train were given sedatives and could not be interviewed in the immediate aftermath.

A brown corgi terrier, initially reported as the last survivor, was removed from the wreckage of a carriage just after midnight. A search for the owner revealed it to be a resident of the nearby Becontree estate and the dog "Rinty" had entered the train after the crash.

The local lines were de-energised and cleared overnight. They were available from 04:15 for the first electric London Underground service on Friday 31 January. Both through lines were cleared and available for the Fenchurch Street steam service from 14:00. The Queen and Philip, Duke of Edinburgh messaged the Minister of Transport and conveyed sympathy to the victims.

Coming soon after the similar December 1957 Lewisham rail crash, the public had concerns that the railway was unsafe. James Watkins, a member of the British Transport Commission overseeing the railways, gave a press conference on 31 January to calm fears. He said that the British Railways death rate was one person per 734 million miles travelled and absolute safety was impossible on the railway, because of human error. Harold Watkinson, the Minister of Transport and Civil Aviation, gave a statement in the House of Commons on 31 January and appointed Charles Ardagh Langley to hold the inquiry into the accident.

== Cause ==
BR Standard Class 4 2-6-4T, now in preservation, running 'bunker first'

The inquiry took place in February 1958. The reports for the Dagenham and Lewisham crashes were published on 24 July 1958. It was concluded that the collision was caused by driver error and the 18:35 train passed the Upney starter signal at danger. Visibility was down to 10 yards (9.1 m) due to fog and it would only have been visible for two to three seconds. It was on a high post 21 feet (6.4 m) above rail level. The driver was inexperienced and it was the first time he had driven on the line in thick fog. The Strowger–Hudd Automatic Warning System operated only at distant signals. The old wooden-framed coaching stock contributed to the number of fatalities, although these were reduced because the rearmost compartment was only occupied by the guard.

== Legacy ==
A similar incident in fog took place at East Ham in November 1959, without fatalities. Colour-light signals would have prevented the accident and these were installed as part of the planned electrification of the London, Tilbury and Southend line. Wooden-framed coaching stock were replaced with steel-framed as part of these works. It was the worst disaster to occur on the line. BR Standard Class 4 locomotive 80079 from the 18:35 train is preserved at the heritage Severn Valley Railway.
