= Becontree (disambiguation) =

Becontree is a housing estate of around 100,000 people in East London

Becontree can also refer to:

- Becontree tube station, London
- Becontree Hundred, an ancient division of the county of Essex
- Becontree Heath, the meeting place of Becontree Hundred, a hamlet in Dagenham parish and open space
