= Upney tube station =

London Underground station

Upney
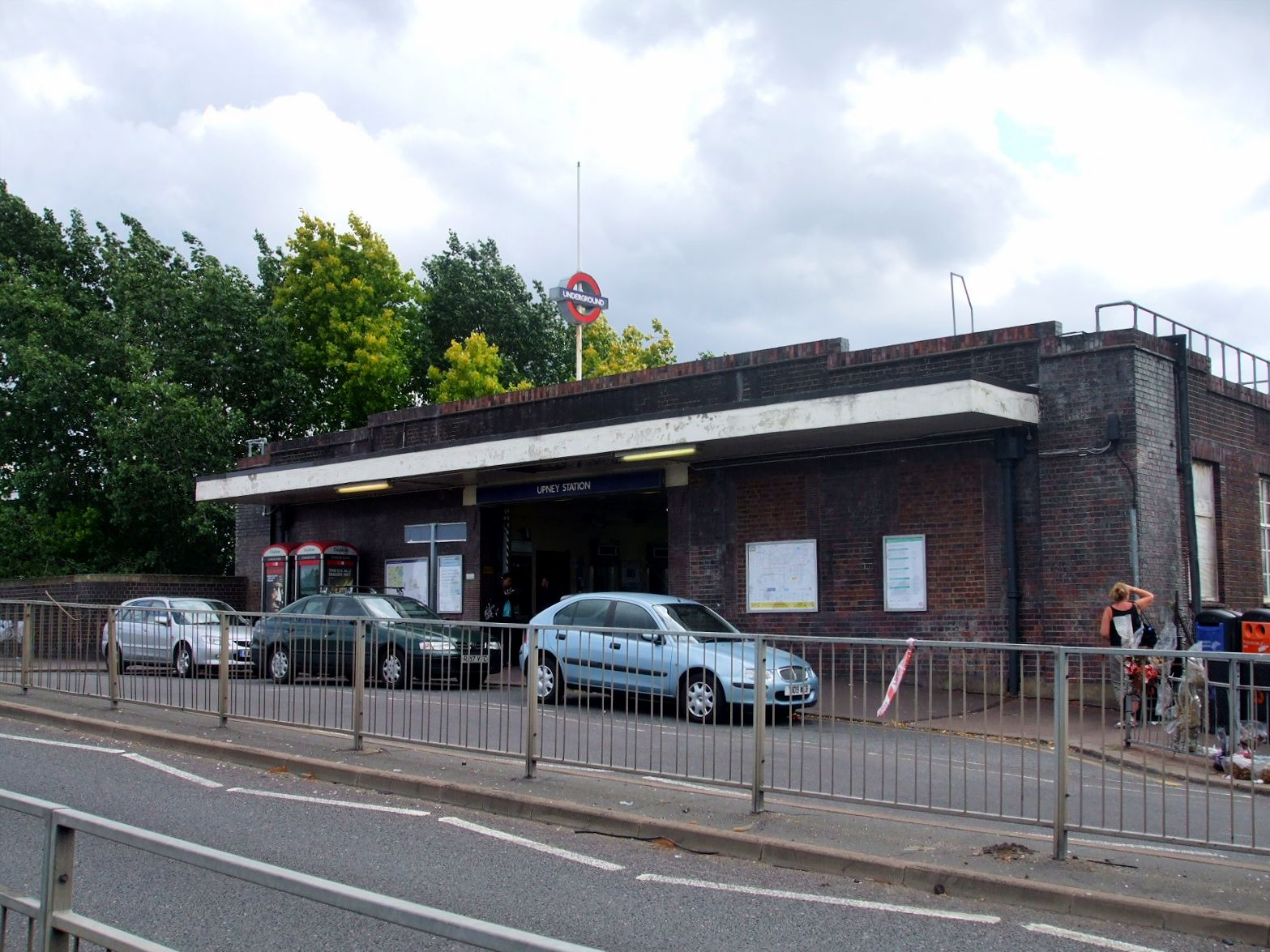
- Station entrance on Upney Lane

General information
- Location: Barking, Barking and Dagenham
- Coordinates: 51.53861°N 0.10138°E
- Owned by: Transport for London
- Managed by: London Underground
- Platforms: 2

Construction
- Accessible: Yes

Other information
- Fare zone: 4
- Website: Official website

History
- Opened: 12 September 1932
- Original company: London, Midland and Scottish Railway

Key dates
- 1 January 1948: Ownership transferred to British Railways
- 1 January 1969: Ownership transferred to London Transport

Passengers

London Underground annual entry and exit
- 2021: ▼1.24 million
- 2022: ▲1.94 million
- 2023: ▲2.15 million
- 2024: ▲2.17 million
- 2025: ▼2.14 million
Location
- Location in Barking and Dagenham

Upney (/ˈʌpni/) is a London Underground station on Upney Lane in Barking in the London Borough of Barking and Dagenham, east London. It is on the District line between Barking to the west and Becontree to the east. It is 11.0 kilometres (6.8 mi) along the line from the eastern terminus at Upminster and 13.7 kilometres (8.5 mi) to Tower Hill in central London. The station was opened on 12 September 1932 by the London, Midland and Scottish Railway with an additional pair of tracks that were constructed to serve the electric District Railway local service from Barking to Upminster. The single-storey brick building is of a common design also constructed at other stations on the eastern portion of the line. It is in London fare zone 4.

== History ==
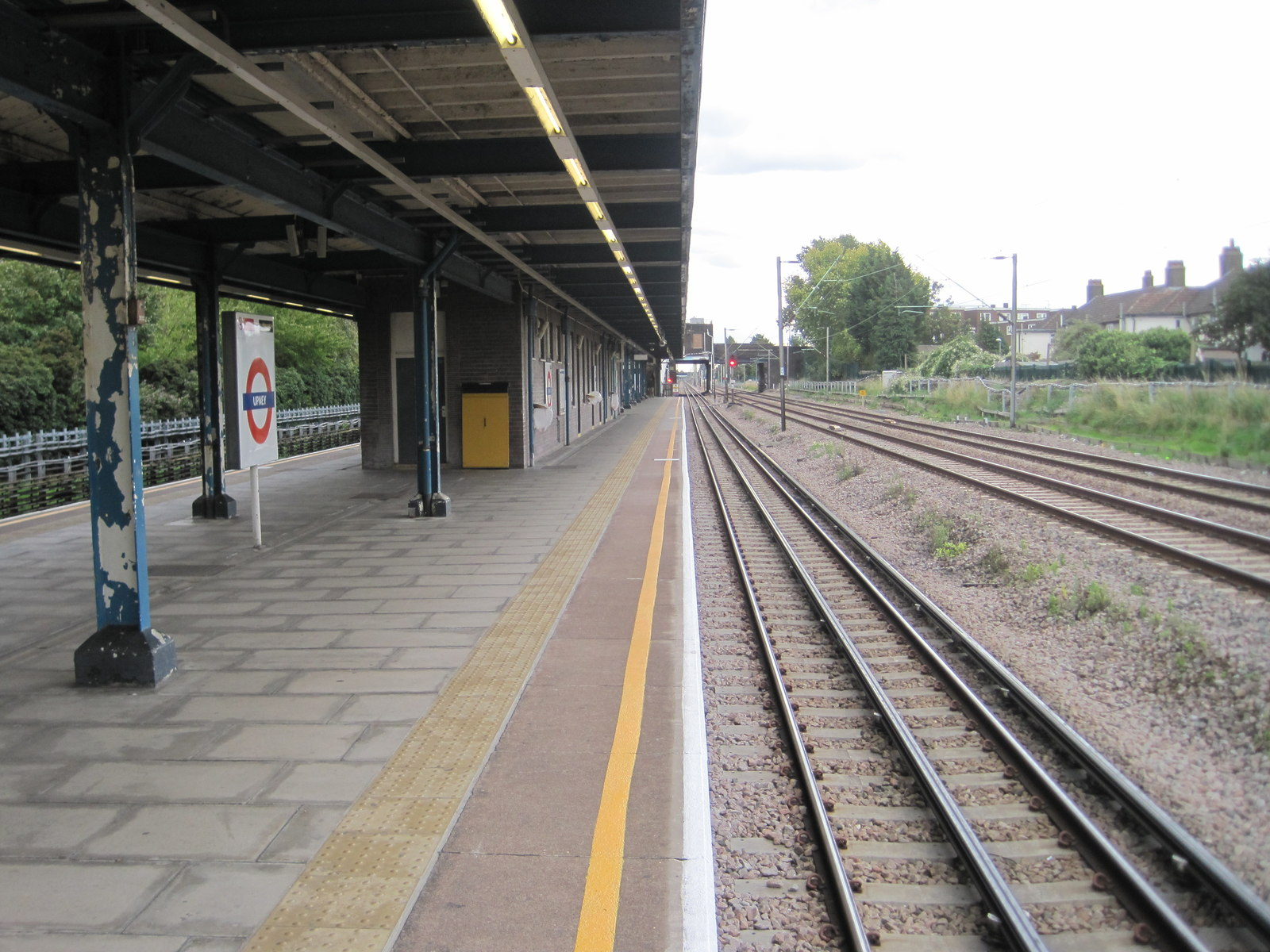
Platforms with Fenchurch Street–Southend tracks to the right

The original route of the London, Tilbury and Southend Railway from Forest Gate junction on the Eastern Counties Railway was constructed through the Barking area in 1854, with a station at Barking. A new more direct route between Barking and Pitsea was constructed between 1885 and 1888. It passed through the site of the current Upney station but a station was not built at that time. The Whitechapel and Bow Railway opened in 1902 and allowed through services of the District Railway to operate to Upminster. The District converted to electric trains in 1905 and services were cut back to East Ham. (Note: Electric service was extended to Barking on 1 April 1908.) Delayed by World War I, electrified tracks were extended by the London, Midland and Scottish Railway (LMS) to Upminster and District Railway services resumed on 12 September 1932.

The new tracks built by the London, Midland and Scottish Railway allowed additional intermediate stations to be constructed on the local lines. Increased local demand was caused by the building of the Becontree estate by the London County Council (LCC) during the interwar period. In 1920 the Upney Lane site for a station had been identified by the Midland Railway and the LCC. The infill station was opened with platforms on the local electric lines on 12 September 1932. The station was built to the designs of LMS architect William Henry Hamlyn, drawing inspiration from London Underground station architecture. Electric train service was initially a train every 10 minutes at peak times and every 20 minutes off-peak. The District Railway was incorporated into London Transport in 1933 and became known as the District line. The station was operated by the London, Midland and Scottish Railway but was only served by District Railway trains. (Note: The 1947 LMS timetable shows no steam trains calling at Upney.) After nationalisation of the railways in 1948 management of the station passed to British Railways. On 1 January 1969 ownership of the station transferred to the London Underground.

As part of the public–private partnership arrangement for maintenance of the London Underground, the station was due to be refurbished by Metronet. Following the collapse of Metronet, responsibility of station upkeep was transferred to Transport for London in 2008. (Note: Works were planned to include provision of tactile strips and colour contrasted handrails for the visually impaired, installation of closed-circuit television cameras, passenger help points, new electronic departure information displays on the platforms, a new public address system, and improved lighting.) Transport for London has assigned the station to the 'limited works' category and plans to complete these improvements incrementally, according to the need to preserve assets.

== Design ==
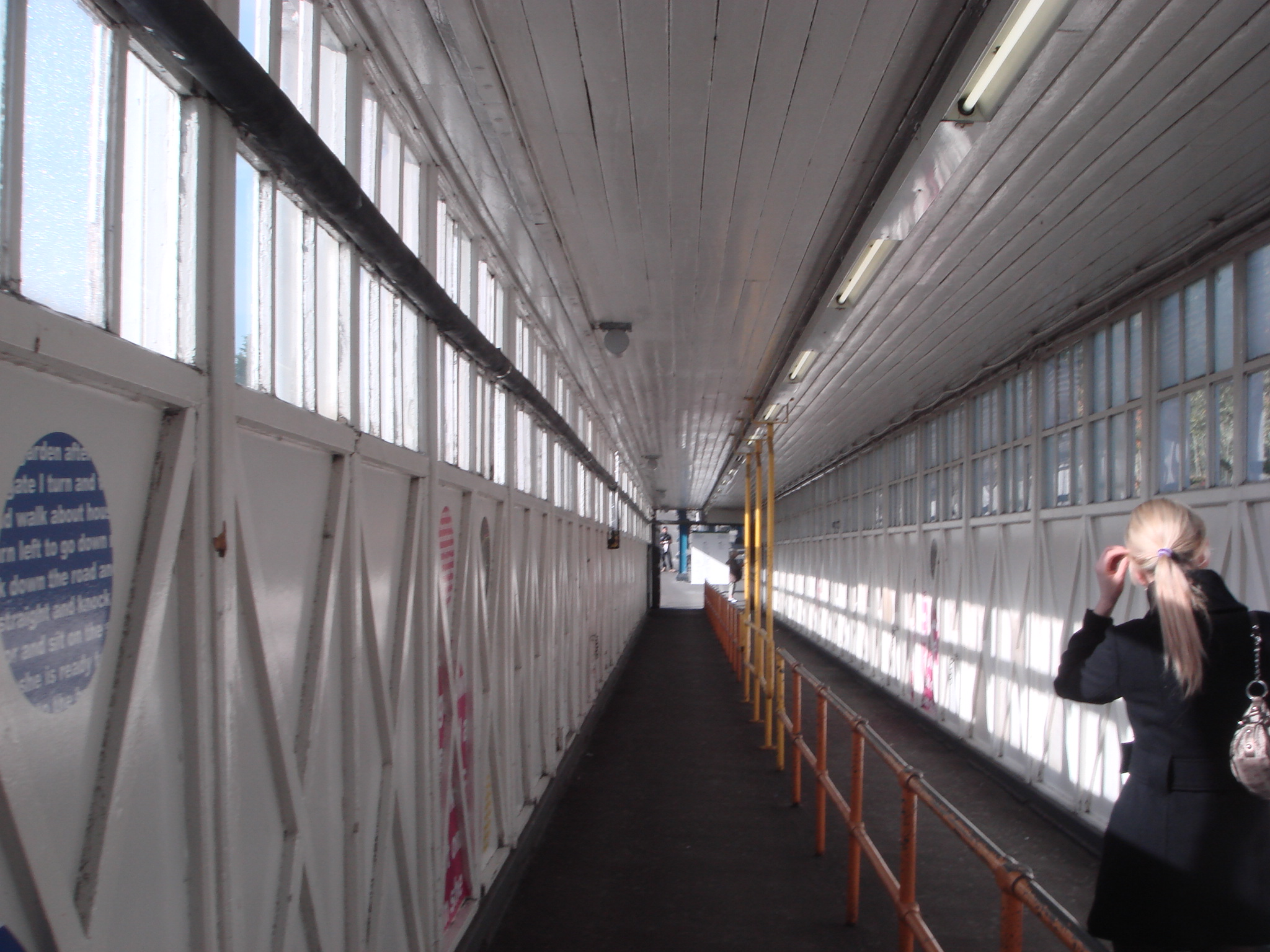
Ramp between ticket office and platforms

The station consists of a central island platform—numbered 1 for westbound and 2 for eastbound—between the tracks. There are four tracks through the site although there are no platforms for the London, Tilbury and Southend line. The platforms are 700 feet (210 m) in length with the 400 feet (120 m) section currently in operational use under a single canopy supported by columns. There are central platform buildings, including a waiting room and public toilet.

The ticket office is located on the bridge above platform level, to which it is connected by a long sloping walkway. There is step-free access from the platform to the street. The design is similar the station at Elm Park, with the platform made from precast concrete.

== Location ==
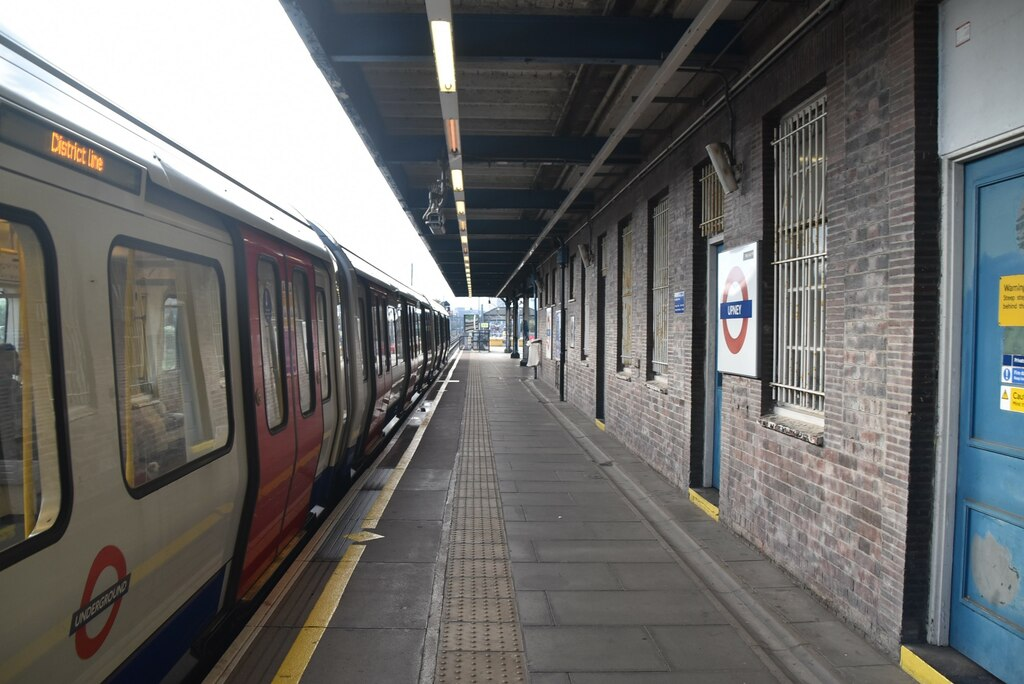
District line train at the westbound platform

The station is named after Upney Lane in Barking on which it is located, in the London Borough of Barking and Dagenham. The station is served by London Buses route 62, providing connections to Barking, Becontree, Chadwell Heath, Dagenham and Marks Gate.

Becontree station is 1.87 kilometres (1.16 mi) to the east of the station and Barking is 1.47 kilometres (0.91 mi) to the west. Upney is 13.72 kilometres (8.53 mi) along the line from Tower Hill in central London and 10.89 kilometres (6.77 mi) from the eastern terminus at Upminster. The station is 8 miles 36 chains (13.60 km) down the line from Fenchurch Street.

== Services ==
The station is managed by London Underground. It is in London fare zone 4. The typical off-peak service from the station is 12 District line trains per hour to Upminster and 12 to Earl's Court, of which six continue to Ealing Broadway and six continue to Richmond. At peak periods the number of trains per hour increases to 15 and some trains continue from Earl's Court to Wimbledon. Services towards central London operate from approximately 05:15 to 00:00 and services to Upminster operate from approximately 05:45 to 01:15. With 2.14 million entries and exits in 2025, it ranked 208th busiest London Underground station.

== Notes ==
Preceding station	London Underground	Following station
Barking towards Wimbledon, Richmond or Ealing Broadway	District line	Becontree towards Upminster
