= Elm Park tube station =

London Underground station

Elm Park
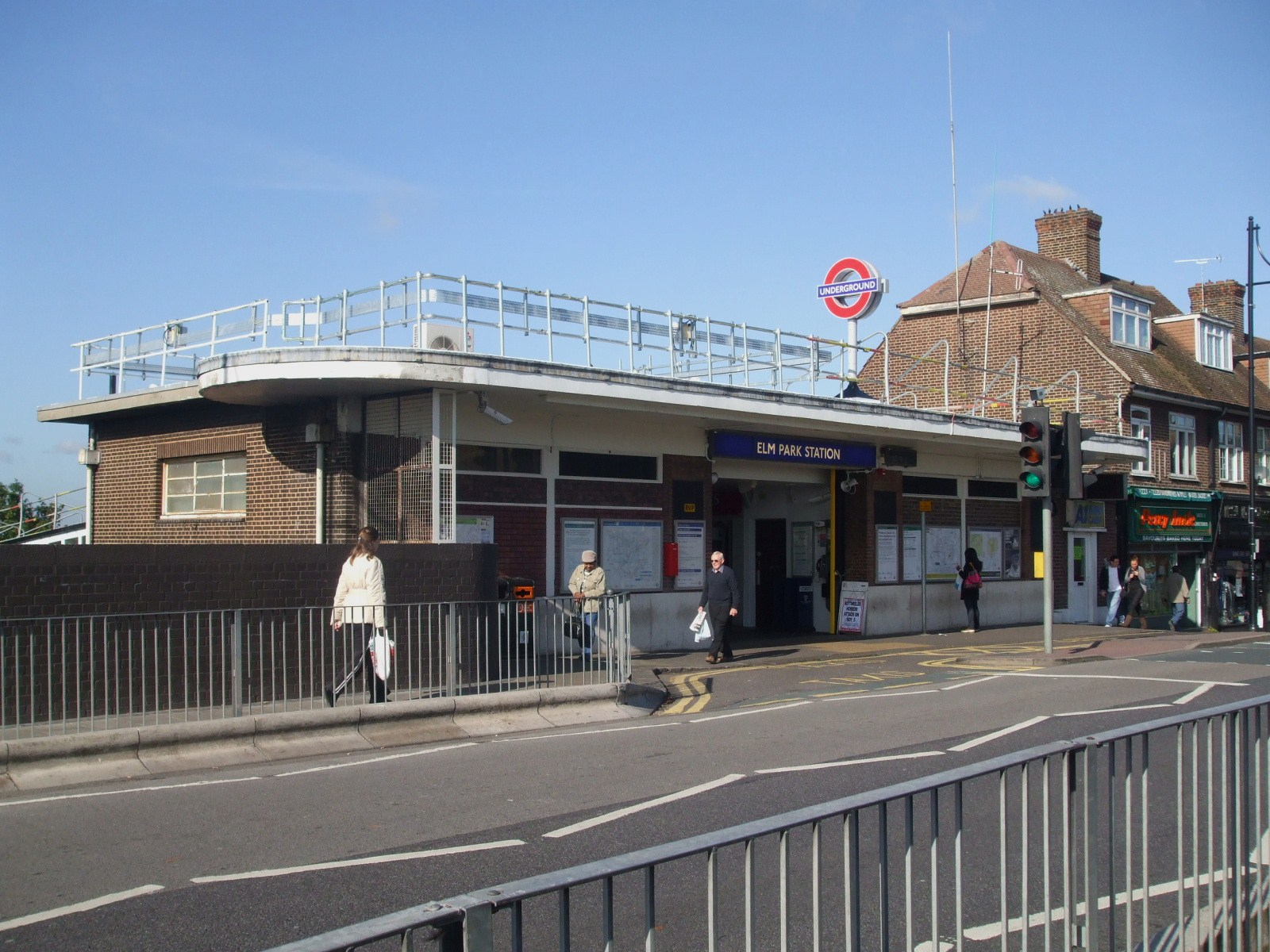
- Entrance on The Broadway

General information
- Location: Elm Park, Havering
- Coordinates: 51.54920°N 0.20031°E
- Manager: London Underground
- Platforms: 2

Construction
- Accessible: Yes

Other information
- Fare zone: 6
- Website: Official website

History
- Opened: 13 May 1935
- Original company: London, Midland and Scottish Railway

Key dates
- 1 January 1948: Ownership transferred to British Railways
- 1 January 1969: Ownership transferred to London Transport

Passengers

London Underground annual entry and exit
- 2021: ▼1.41 million
- 2022: ▲2.23 million
- 2023: ▲2.54 million
- 2024: ▼2.53 million
- 2025: ▲2.66 million
Location
- Location in Havering

Elm Park is a London Underground station in the Elm Park neighbourhood of the London Borough of Havering, East London. It is on the District line between Dagenham to the west and Hornchurch to the east. It is 4 kilometres (2.5 mi) along the line from the eastern terminus at Upminster and 20.7 kilometres (12.9 mi) from Tower Hill in Central London. The station was opened by the London, Midland and Scottish Railway on 13 May 1935 with an official opening ceremony on 18 May 1935. The station was refurbished by Metronet in 2005 and 2006. It was the last infill station on the London Underground until 2008. The station is of a similar design to those constructed at Dagenham Heathway and Upney. It is in London fare zone 6.

== History ==
The London, Tilbury and Southend Railway constructed a line from Barking to Pitsea through the Hornchurch area in 1885, with stations at Dagenham and Hornchurch. The Whitechapel and Bow Railway opened in 1902 and allowed through services of the District Railway to operate to Upminster. The District converted to electric trains in 1905 and services were cut back to East Ham. (Note: Electric service was extended to Barking on 1 April 1908.) Delayed by World War I, electrified tracks were extended by the London, Midland and Scottish Railway (LMS) to Upminster and through services resumed in 1932. The District Railway was incorporated into London Transport in 1933, and became known as the District line.

The infill station was provided from 13 May 1935 to serve the Elm Park Garden City development. The developer, Richard Costain and Sons Ltd., negotiated with the LMS to have the station built on the existing line. It was officially opened by Hilton Young, Minister of Health on 18 May 1935 as part of a day of celebration. The station was built to the designs of LMS architect William Henry Hamlyn, drawing inspiration from London Underground station architecture. Electric train service was initially a train every 10 minutes at peak times and every 20 minutes off-peak. The station was operated by the London, Midland and Scottish Railway but was only served by District line trains. (Note: The 1947 LMS timetable shows a single daily steam service to Fenchurch Street.)

Derek Wayman, a four year-old child from Elm Park Avenue, was electrocuted on the railway line near the station on 1 June 1935. After nationalisation of the railways on 1 January 1948, management of the station was passed to British Railways. On 1 January 1969 ownership transferred to the London Underground. As part of the public–private partnership arrangement for maintenance of the London Underground, the station was refurbished by Metronet during 2005 and 2006. The station was the last to be opened on an existing London Underground line (rather than as part of an extension or new line) until Wood Lane on the Hammersmith & City line in 2008.

== Design ==
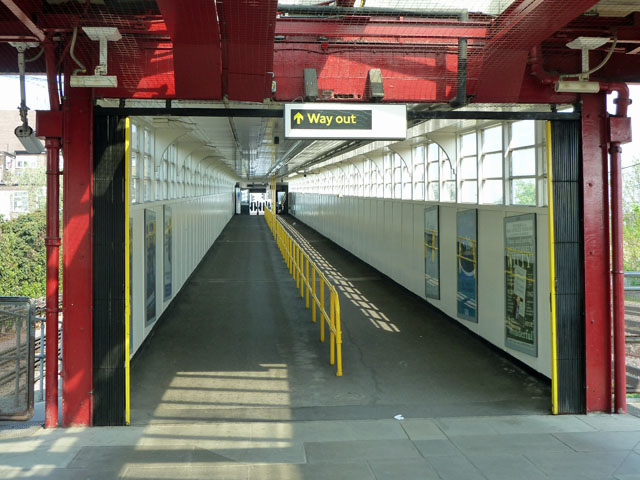
The ramp from the platforms to the ticket office

The station consists of a central island platform—numbered 1 for westbound and 2 for eastbound—between the tracks. There are four tracks through the site although there are no platforms for the London, Tilbury and Southend line. The platforms are 700 feet (210 m) in length with the 400 feet (120 m) section currently in operational use under a single canopy supported by a row of central columns. There are central platform buildings, including a waiting room and public toilet.

The Art Deco ticket office is located above platform level, to which it is connected by a long sloping walkway. There is step-free access from the platform to the street. The design is similar to stations at Dagenham Heathway and Upney, although the building has greater use of reinforced concrete which has created a more distinctive design with a curved roof overhang.

Works from the 2005/6 refurbishment included provision of tactile strips and colour contrasted handrails for the visually impaired, installation of closed-circuit television cameras, passenger help points, new electronic departure information displays on the platforms, a new public address system and improved lighting. In 2010 it was noted there were "no changes of substance" since opening.

== Location ==
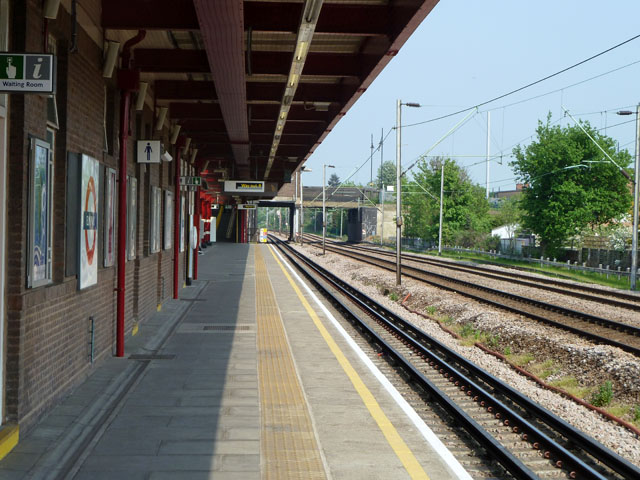
The westbound platform with the London, Tilbury and Southend line tracks to the right

The station is situated within the mid-1930s planned community of Elm Park. The name was derived from Elm Farm, which is first recorded in 1777 and was known as Elms in 1883, around the time the railway was constructed through the area. It is located on The Broadway in the London Borough of Havering. The immediate area is a busy, compact shopping district surrounded by extensive residential development to the north and south. (Note: Elm Park is designated as a 'district centre' in the London Plan.) The station is served by London Buses routes 165, 252, 365, 372 and SL12.

Hornchurch station is 1.5 kilometres (0.93 mi) to the east of the station and Dagenham East is 2.4 kilometres (1.5 mi) to the west. It is 20.7 kilometres (12.9 mi) along the line from Tower Hill in Central London and 4.0 kilometres (2.5 mi) from the eastern terminus at Upminster. The station is 12 miles 57 chains (20.5 km) down the line from Fenchurch Street.

== Services ==
The station is managed by London Underground. It is in London fare zone 6. The typical off-peak service from the station is 12 District line trains per hour to Upminster and 12 to Earl's Court, of which six continue to Ealing Broadway and six continue to Richmond. At peak periods the number of trains per hour increases to 15 and some trains continue from Earl's Court to Wimbledon. Services towards Central London operate from approximately 05:00 to 23:45 and services to Upminster operate from approximately 06:00 to 01:30. With 2.66 million entries and exits in 2025, it ranked 194th busiest London Underground station.

== Notes ==
| Preceding station | London Underground | Following station |
|---|---|---|
| Dagenham East towards Wimbledon, Richmond or Ealing Broadway | District line | Hornchurch towards Upminster |
