= Victoria Road (Dagenham) =

Football stadium in London, England

Coordinates: 51°32′52″N 0°09′36″E

Chigwell Construction Stadium
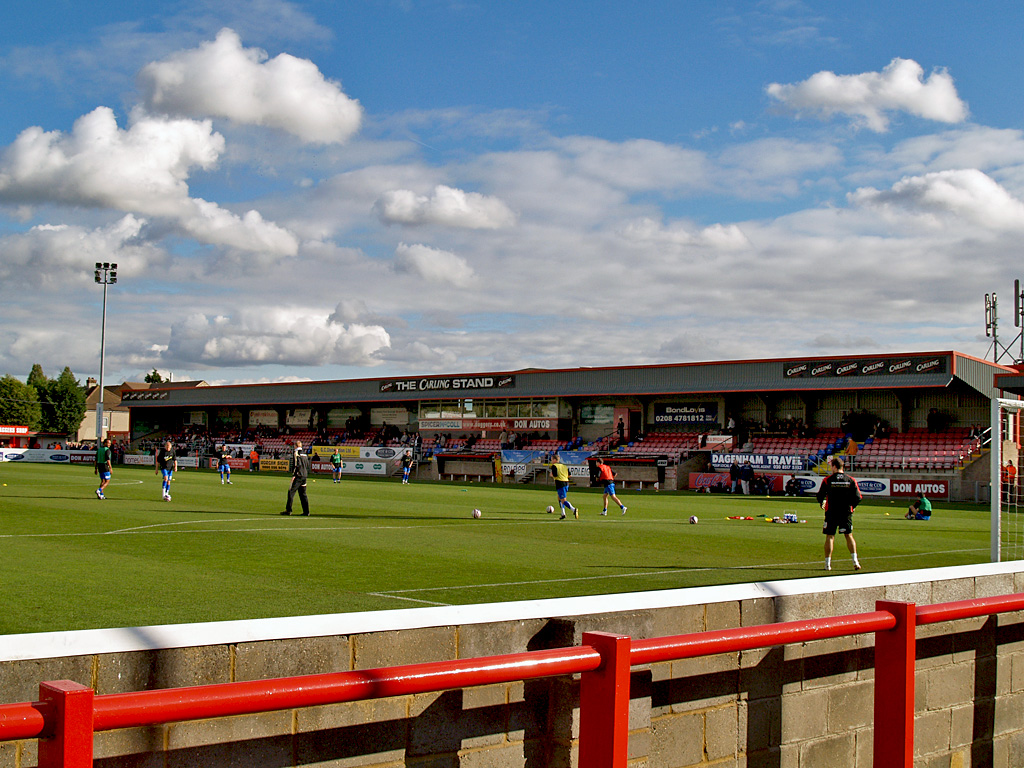
- Carling Stand at Chigwell Construction Stadium
- Interactive map of Chigwell Construction Stadium
- Location: Dagenham, Greater London
- Coordinates: TQ497854
- Capacity: 6,078
- Surface: Grass (112 x 72 yards)
- Public transit: Dagenham East

Construction
- Opened: 1917

Tenants
- Dagenham & Redbridge; West Ham United Women; West Ham United under-23s

Victoria Road, currently known as the Chigwell Construction Stadium for sponsorship purposes, is a football stadium located in Dagenham, Greater London, England. The stadium has a capacity of 6,078 and is the home ground of Dagenham & Redbridge and West Ham United Women.

== Ground use ==
The stadium is primarily used by the National League South side Dagenham & Redbridge.

The Women's Super League team West Ham United Women are also using the ground to host their league matches.

== Gallery ==
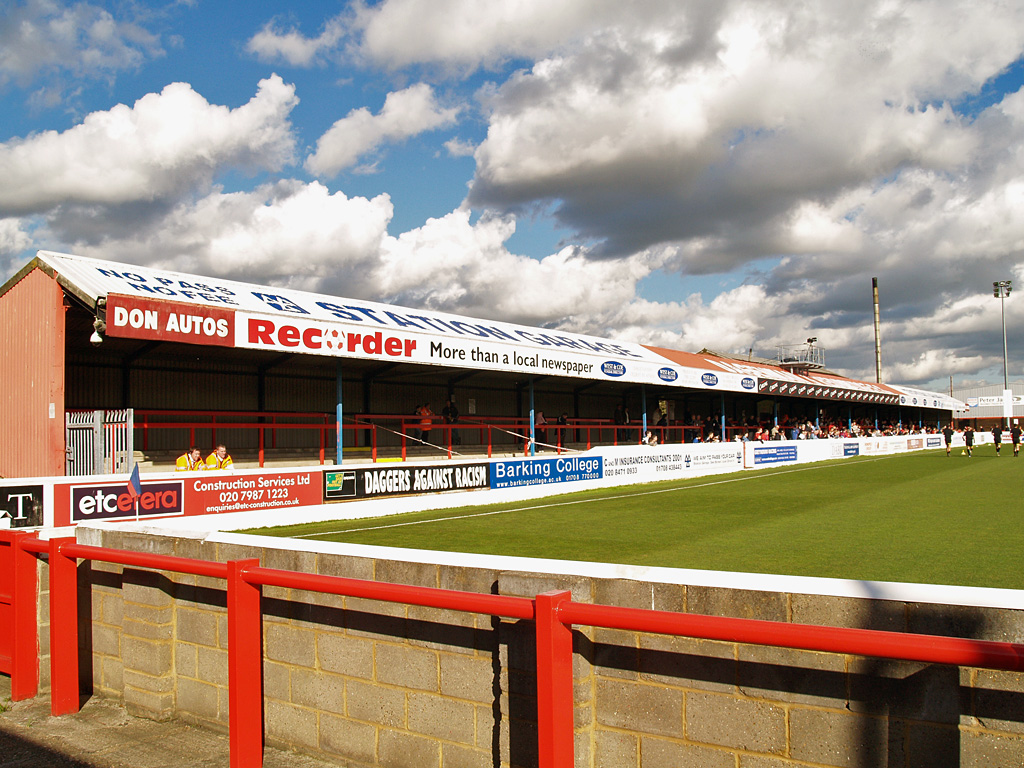
North Stand

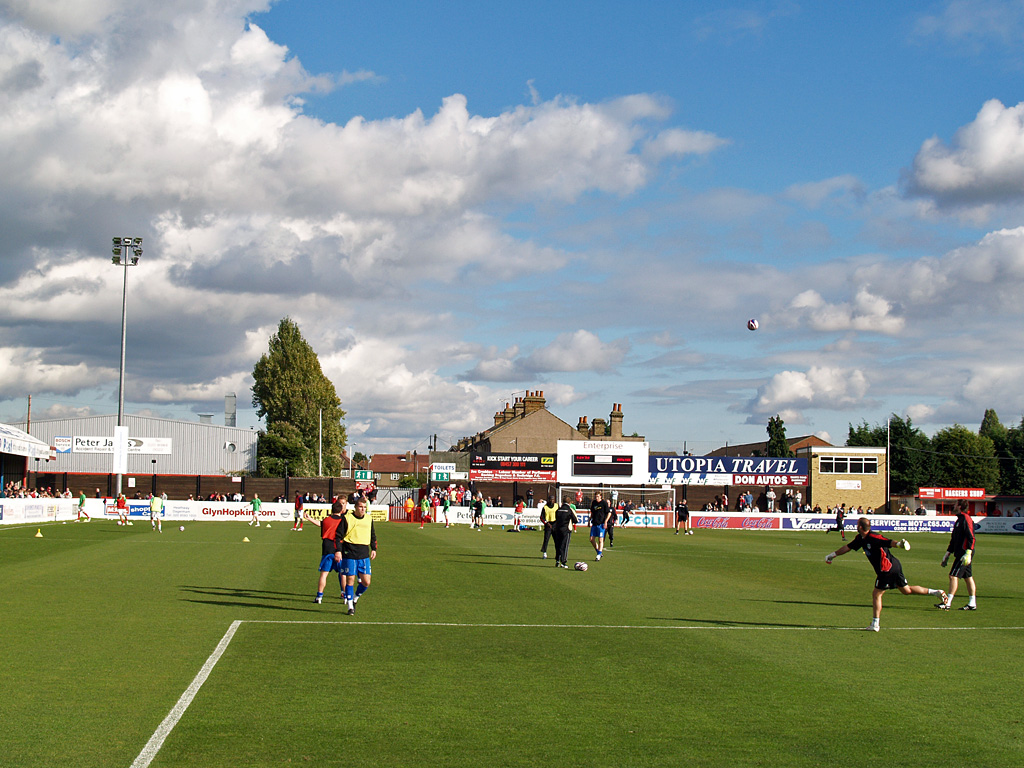
Bury Road End

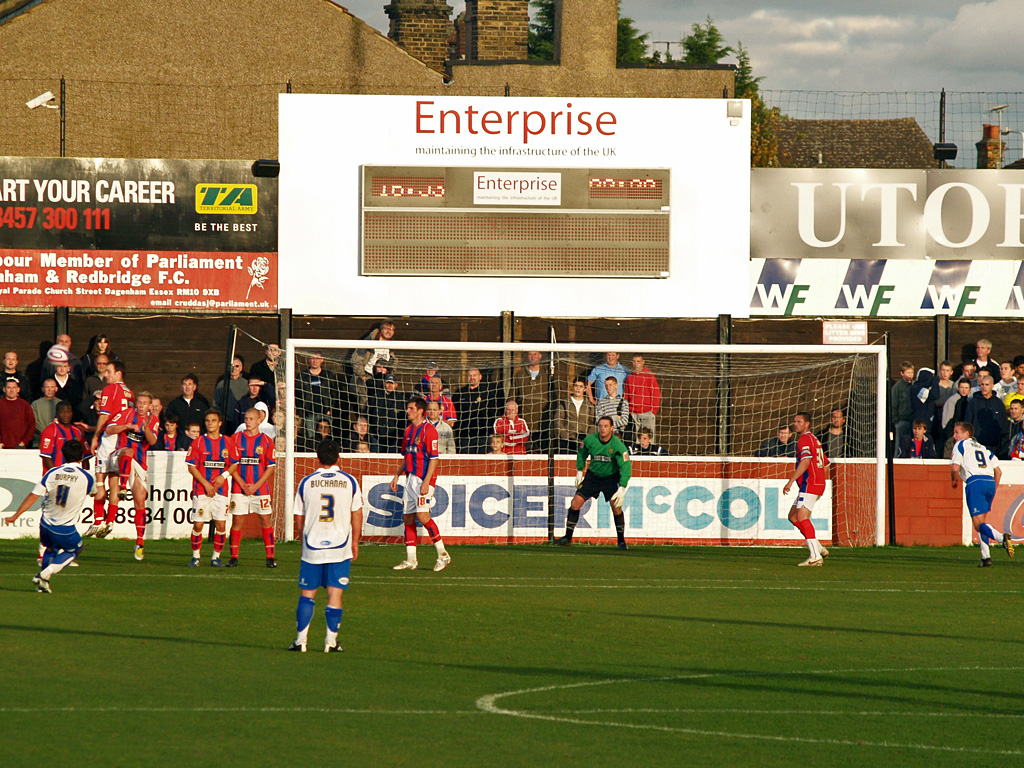
Goal and scoreboard at Bury Road End
