= Dagenham =

Town in east London, England

Coordinates: 51.5397°N 0.1422°E

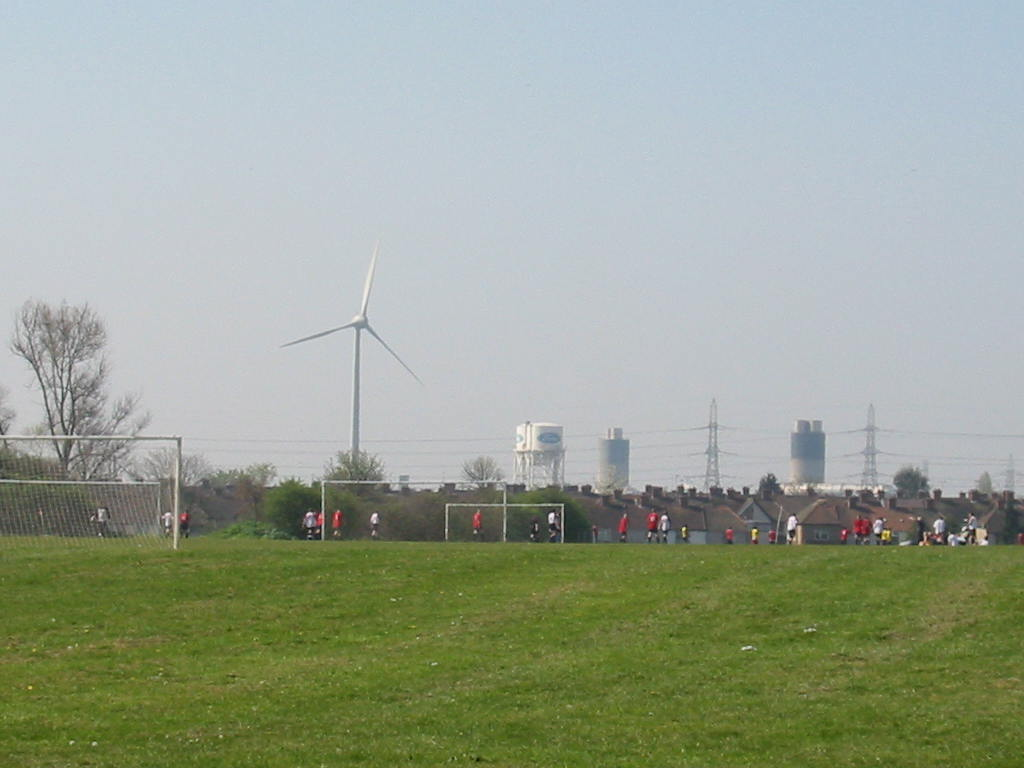
- The southern Dagenham skyline includes structures of the Ford plant and wind turbines.

- Location within Greater London
- Population: 106,247 (2011)
- OS grid reference: TQ485845
  - Charing Cross: 11.5 mi (18.5 km) W
- London borough: Barking & Dagenham
- Ceremonial county: Greater London
- Region: London
- Country: England
- Sovereign state: United Kingdom
- Post town: DAGENHAM
- Postcode district: RM8-RM10
- Post town: BARKING
- Postcode district: IG11
- Dialling code: 020
- Police: Metropolitan
- Fire: London
- Ambulance: London
- UK Parliament: Dagenham and Rainham; Barking
- London Assembly: City and East

Dagenham (/ˈdæɡənəm/) is a town in East London, England, within the London Borough of Barking and Dagenham. Dagenham is centred 11 1/2 miles (19 kilometres) east of Charing Cross.

It was historically a rural parish in the Becontree Hundred of Essex, stretching from Hainault Forest in the north to the River Thames in the south. Dagenham remained mostly undeveloped until 1921, when the London County Council began construction of the large Becontree housing estate. The population significantly increased as people moved to the new housing in the early 20th century, with the parish of Dagenham becoming Dagenham Urban District in 1926 and the Municipal Borough of Dagenham in 1938. In 1965 Dagenham became part of Greater London when most of the historic parish become part of the London Borough of Barking and Dagenham.

Dagenham was chosen as a location for industrial activity and is perhaps most famous for being the location of the Ford Dagenham motor car plant where the Ford sewing machinists strike of 1968 took place. Following the decline of industry, the southern part of Dagenham adjacent to the River Thames forms part of the London Riverside section of the Thames Gateway redevelopment area, with a new district of Beam Park under construction on the former site of Ford Dagenham.

== History ==
Dagenham (parish) population
1881	3,411
1891	4,324
1901	6,091
1911	7,930
1921	9,127
1931	89,362
1941	#
1951	114,568
1961	108,368
# no census was held due to war
source: UK census

=== Toponymy ===
Dagenham first appeared in a document (as Dæccanhaam) in a charter of Barking Abbey dating from 666 AD (though alternative 7th century dates have been suggested for the charter). The name almost certainly originated with a small farmstead, the "ham" or farm of a man called Daecca, as Dæccan hamm in Old English means home of a man called Dæcca. The charter was made to reflect a transfer of land from Aethelred, kinsman of King Saebbi of Essex, to Barking Abbey.

=== Manor of Barking ===
Dagenham has been historically defined by its ancient parish boundaries. The parish of Dagenham was formed in the medieval period from part of the huge manor of Barking, which was owned by the Nunnery of Barking Abbey. The Barking manor also included Barking and Great Ilford, which reversed the usual situation where a parish would be divided into one or more manors. As with other manors, the area held declined over time, and Barking Abbey was dissolved in 1539. The parish boundaries remained constant and were used to define Dagenham right up until the Municipal Borough of Dagenham was abolished in 1965.

=== Pre-urban landscape ===
Like most Essex Thames-side parishes, Dagenham was laid out on a north–south axis to give it a share of the marshes by the river, the agricultural land in the centre and the woods and commons on the poorer soils on the high ground in the north. Dagenham included a significant part of the now mostly lost Hainault Forest.

=== Dagenham Breach ===
South of Dagenham was a low-lying area including the Dagenham levels and Dagenham Marsh, these having been subject to periodic flooding from the Thames, and flood banks were built to protect the farmland, culminating in defences and a flood gate on the River Beam being built in the 17th century by Dutch engineers. In 1707 an exceptionally high tide swept away fourteen feet of embankment and flooded over 1,000 acres of land, the description given by Daniel Defoe when he visited eight years later giving the area inundated as being 5000 acres is today considered an exaggeration.

The "Dagenham Breach" widened over time to a width of 400 feet, allowing the Thames to strip the top layer of marsh clay from the flood plain and deposited it as a mud bank in the Thames where it became a danger to shipping. Despite various remedies, the breach was not securely filled and a further flood occurred in 1718 after which, under an act of parliament, over £40,000 of public money was spent on successfully closing the breach roughly at the location of Dagenham Dock. The closure of the gap left behind a large lake, also known as "Dagenham Breach" which became a popular spot for anglers. The lake is still there but much of it has silted up or been filled in and is now surrounded by industry, but parts can still be identified as the lakes to the north of Ford's plant and also where Breach Lane follows the now lost western outline of the lake.

=== Whitebait Dinners ===
Dagenham was formerly home to the famous annual whitebait feast. The custom appears to have been started by the King's Commissioner of Works to celebrate the closure of the breach in the seawall around 1714–20, and was held every subsequent spring, on or around Trinity Sunday.

Many years later, Sir Robert Preston MP, invited his friend George Rose the Secretary of the Treasury and others to celebrate the feast, and on another occasion Rose invited the Prime Minister, William Pitt. Thereafter it became an obligatory ritual of government for the entire cabinet to come to Dagenham and celebrate the security of the Thames and over time this simple but hearty meal based on Whitebait and local Essex Ale grew more lavish, including turtle, grouse, champagne and a range of other luxury food and drink. Eventually the cabinet tired of the long trip to Dagenham and moved the event to Greenwich.

=== Economic development ===
In 1931 the Ford Motor Company relocated from Trafford Park in Manchester, to a larger new plant in Dagenham, which was already the location of supplier Briggs Motorway Bodies. A 500-acre (200 ha) riverside site was developed to become Europe's largest car plant, a vast vertically integrated site with its own blast furnaces and power station, importing iron ore and exporting finished vehicles. By the 1950s Ford had taken over Briggs at Dagenham and its other sites at Doncaster, Southampton, Croydon and Romford. At its peak the Dagenham plant had 4,000,000 square feet (370,000 m^{2}) of floor space and employed over 40,000 people, although this number gradually fell during the final three decades of the 20th century as production methods advanced and Ford invested in other European factories as well. Some of Britain's best selling cars, including the Fiesta, Escort, Cortina and Sierra, were produced at the plant over the next 71 years.

On 20 February 2002, full production was discontinued due to overcapacity in Europe and the relative difficulty of upgrading the ageing site compared with mostly newer European production facilities such as Almussafes (Valencia, Spain) and Cologne. Other factors leading to the closure of the Auto-assembly line were the need of the site for the new Diesel Centre of Excellence, which produces half of Ford's Diesel Engines worldwide, and the UK employment laws when compared to Spanish, German and Belgian laws.

In 2005 Cummins went into a joint venture and offered $15 million (US) to reinstate the factory. Ford and Cummins offered a good redundancy package, billed as one of the best in UK manufacturing. It is the location of the Dagenham wind turbines. Some 2,000 people now work at the Ford plant. The movie Made in Dagenham (2010) is a dramatisation of the 1968 Ford sewing machinists strike at the plant, when female workers walked out in protest against sexual discrimination and unequal pay.

Sterling, who manufactured British Army weapons and Jaguar car parts, were also based in Dagenham until they went bankrupt in 1988.

Other industrial names once known worldwide were Ever Ready, whose batteries could be found in shops throughout the Commonwealth, Bergers Paint and the chemical firm of May & Baker who in 1935 revolutionized the production of antibiotics with their synthetic sulfa-drug known as M&B 693. The May & Baker plant, owned and run by Sanofi-Aventis, occupied a 108-acre site in Rainham Road South, near Dagenham East Underground station. It was abandoned in 2013 when the company closed it. BeFirst, a company working on behalf of the council, began to redevelop the site for commercial opportunities. It is now the London East Business and Technical Park. NTT have their London1 data centre on this site, and the Eastbrook Studios is currently under construction.

=== Local government ===
Dagenham was an ancient, and later civil, parish in the Becontree hundred of Essex. The Metropolitan Police District was extended in 1840 to include Dagenham. The parish formed part of the Romford Rural District from 1894. Dagenham Parish Council offices were located on Bull Street.

The expansion of the Greater London conurbation into the area caused the review of local government structures, and it was suggested in 1920 that the Dagenham parish should be abolished and its area divided between Ilford Urban District and Barking Town Urban District. Separately, the London County Council proposed that its area of responsibility should be expanded beyond the County of London to cover the area. Instead, in 1926 the Dagenham parish was removed from the Romford Rural District and designated as an urban district. In 1938, in further recognition of its development, Dagenham became a municipal borough. In 1965 the Municipal Borough of Dagenham was abolished and its former area became part of the London Borough of Barking, which was renamed Barking and Dagenham in 1980. For elections to the Greater London Council, Dagenham was part of the Barking electoral division until 1973 and then the Dagenham electoral division until 1986.

=== Market gardens to suburban estate ===
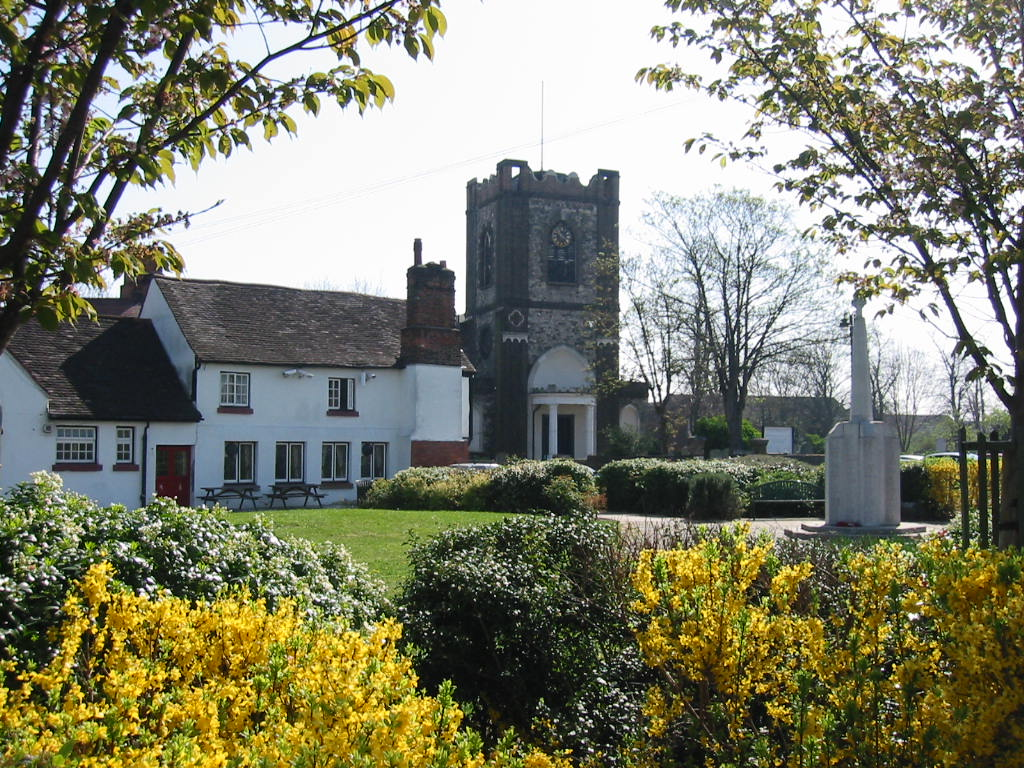
The church of St Peter and St Paul formed the heart of the former village

In 1205 Dagenham was large enough to have a chaplain, and the Parish Church of St Peter and St Paul was probably built at around that time. In 1854, the London, Tilbury and Southend Railway was built through the south of Dagenham, near the River Thames. In 1885 a new direct route from Barking to Pitsea, via Upminster, was built with Dagenham station opened just north of the village. Dagenham Dock station opened on the original southern route in 1908. Dagenham was still an undeveloped village, when building of the vast Becontree estate by the London County Council began in the early 1920s. The building of the enormous council estate, which also spread into the neighbouring parishes of Ilford and Barking, caused a rapid increase in population.

During the Korean War (1950-1953) the large number of national servicemen from Dagenham and Ilford serving in the 1st Battalion of the Essex Regiment, earned the battalion the nickname the Dagenham Light Infantry.

In 1932 the electrified District line of the London Underground was extended to Upminster through Dagenham with stations opened as Dagenham and Heathway and today called Dagenham East and Dagenham Heathway. Dagenham East was the location of the Dagenham East rail crash in 1958. Services on the London Tilbury & Southend line at Dagenham East were withdrawn in 1962.

== Governance ==
The 2010 wards of Eastbrook, Heath, River, Village and Whalebone are in the Dagenham and Rainham parliamentary constituency. The 2010 wards of Alibon, Mayesbrook, Parsloes, Thames and Valence are in the Barking parliamentary constituency. Each ward in B&D elects two or three councillors to Barking and Dagenham London Borough Council. The whole area is within the City and East London Assembly constituency.

== Geography ==
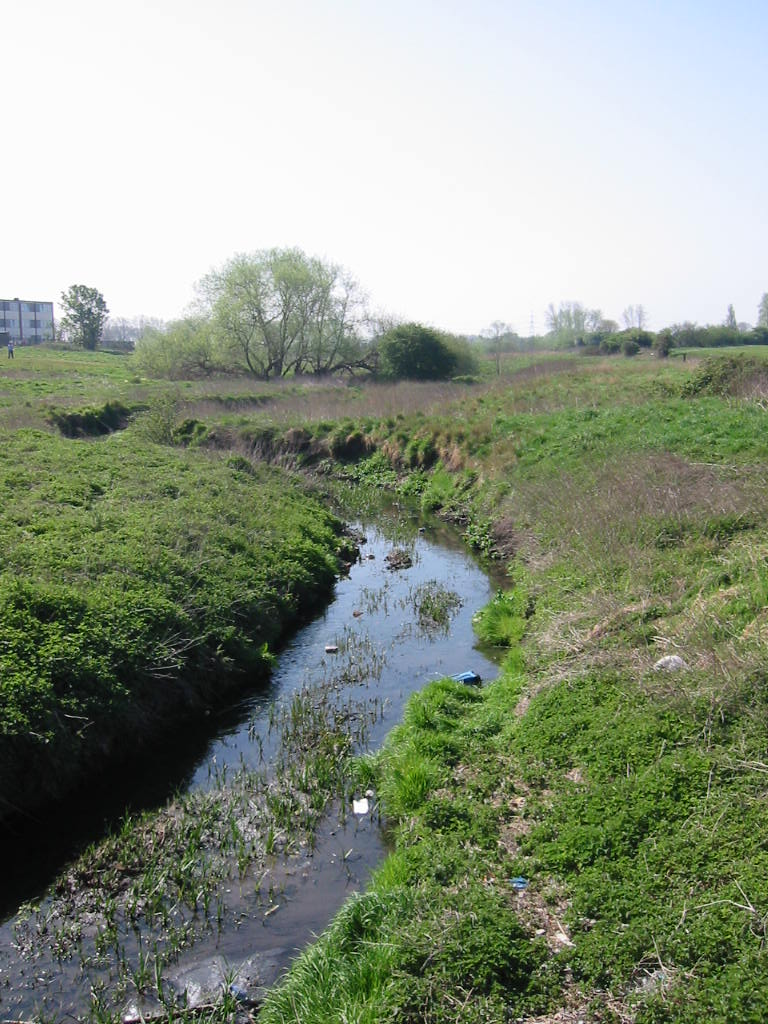
The River Beam in the south of Dagenham

Dagenham is located approximately 11.5 miles (18.5 km) east of Charing Cross in Central London. The Becontree estate is largely in the pre-1965 borough of Dagenham, which also included Becontree Heath, part of Rush Green, Old Dagenham village, and the southern section around Dagenham Dock and adjacent to the River Thames. This southern section, which includes Ford Dagenham, is part of the London Riverside section of the Thames Gateway redevelopment zone. Including new developments of Beam Park and Dagenham Green.

The Dagenham post town includes the whole of the Becontree estate, including those sections that were in the former (pre 1965) boroughs of Barking and Ilford. Parts of the former borough of Dagenham – part of Chadwell Heath, part of Collier Row and part of Rush Green – are in the Romford Post town. It is adjacent to Barking to the west, Romford to northeast and Hornchurch to the east. Dagenham Dock on the River Thames is to the south.

== Demography ==
Dagenham is a working class area. During the 2000s there was a large influx of migrants, in particular Africans. The current population of the former (pre 1965) Borough of Dagenham could be approximated from the population of the current wards which together most closely match the area, but the former boundary between the borough and neighbouring Barking, with which it merged in 1965, no longer corresponds to any ward boundaries.

At the time of the 2011 census, the Alibon ward (north of Heathway station) was 61% White British and 15% Black African. Goresbrook ward (southwest from Heathway) was 57% White British and 17% Black African. River ward (south of Heathway) was 51% White British and 19% Black African. Village ward (east from Heathway) was 58% White British and 19% Black African. Eastbrook ward (around Eastbrookend Country Park) was 69% White British and 11% Black African. Heath ward (north of Heathway) was 60% White British and 17% Black African.

Dagenham Wards Population
	Pop 1991	Pop 2001	Pop 2011	Pop 2021	% of population 1991	% of population 2001	% of population 2011	% of population 2021
Eastbrook & Rush Green	8,891	10,096	10,506	8,649	15.21%	12.64%	12.21%	9.95%
Heath	9,393	9,649	10,786	8,992	16.07%	12.08%	12.54%	10.34%
River	6,659	10,260	10,923	8,610	11.39%	12.85%	12.70%	9.90%
Village (Created from Manor ward, boundary adjusted)	5,793	9,720	10,787	12,540	9.91%	12.17%	12.54%	14.42%
Albion	5,597	9,300	10,385	10,029	9.57%	11.65	12.07%	11.54%
Parsloes	6,532	9,039	9,839	15,251	11.17%	11.32%	11.44%	17.54%
Becontree	8,779	11,450	11,545	9,799	15.02%	14.34%	13.42%	11.27%
Goresbrook	6,815	10,333	11,267	13,070	11.66%	12.94%	13.10%	15.03%
Total	58,459	79,847	86,038		100%	100%	100%	100%

	2001	2011	2021	1991%	2001%	2011 %	2021 %	% of Dagenham's population 2021
White British & Irish	70,194	51,069	TBC	TBC	87.91%	59.36%	TBC	
Other White	1,595	6,055	TBC	TBC	2.00%	7.04%	TBC	
Asian	7,666	7,480	TBC	TBC	2.40%	8.69%	TBC	
Black	4,144	16,931	TBC	TBC	5.19%	19.68%	TBC	
Mixed or multiple ethnicitys	1046	3,304	TBC	TBC	1.31%	3.84%	TBC	
Arab	-	290	TBC	TBC	-	0.77%	TBC	
Other Ethnic Group	560	667	TBC	TBC	0.70	0.77%	TBC	
White Total	71,789	57,124	45,686	TBC	89.91%	66.7%	52.55%	
Ethnic minority total	13,416	28,672	41,254	TBC	10.09%	33.3%	47.55%	
Non-White British total	15,011	34,727	TBC	TBC	12.09%	40.64%	TBC	

== Economy ==
The former May and Baker plant site at Dagenham East is now a centre of film and television production called Eastbrook Studios London.

== Transport ==
Dagenham is connected to the London Underground services from three stations, Becontree (in the pre-1965 borough of Barking), Dagenham East and Dagenham Heathway, all on the District line. c2c, part of National Rail operated by Trenitalia since February 2017, runs a train service through Dagenham Dock station. Elizabeth line services also operate from nearby Chadwell Heath station.

A proposed, and as yet unfunded Docklands Light Railway extension from Gallions Reach to Dagenham Dock. It was anticipated that the project could be completed and open for use by 2017. However the public inquiry has been postponed due to concerns about funding.

Dagenham Heathway is served by the following Transport for London contracted routes: London Buses routes 145, 173, 174, 175 and 364. Routes 145, 173, 174, 175, 287, and EL2 operate in the Dagenham Dock area. Routes 103, 145, and 364 operate in Dagenham East.

Bus routes 5, 103, 128, 150, 173, 175, 499, and N15, and East London Transit service EL2 operate from Becontree Heath, north of Dagenham. Routes 128 and EL1 run a 24-hour service, while the N15 runs through the night.

== Culture ==
Valence House, in Becontree Avenue, is the only surviving of the five manor houses of Dagenham. Dating back to the 13th century, it is sited in parkland and there is a moat around part of it. Valence House is the London Borough of Barking & Dagenham's local history museum, displaying artifacts and archives that tell the story of the lives of the people of Barking and Dagenham. The collection also includes portraits, family papers and other mementos of the Fanshawe family, who occupied Parsloes Manor, since demolished, from the sixteenth century. The Fanshawe collection is "one of the best collections of gentry portraits in the country and is of international importance", according to Valence House. Among members of the Fanshawe family was the diplomat Sir Richard Fanshawe, 1st Baronet, whose portrait is at Valence House. Nine successive members of the Fanshawe family served as Remembrancer to the Crown, following Henry Fanshawe's appointment to the position by Queen Elizabeth I in 1566. The appointment made possible the family's rise to prominence.

In the post town of Romford and the pre-1965 borough of Dagenham, on the corner of Whalebone Lane and the Eastern Avenue, diagonally opposite the Moby-Dick public house, is the site of Marks Manor House, a large 15th-century moated building demolished in the early 19th century. During World War II the adjoining fields were used by the Royal Artillery for an anti-aircraft battery; later a prisoner-of-war camp for Germans was erected there. Further south down Whalebone Lane on the corner of the High Road is the Tollgate pub. This stands on the site of the milestone which marked the ten miles (16 km) limit from the City of London and the turnpike toll-gate.

The Roundhouse public house on the junction of Porters Avenue and Lodge Avenue (in the pre-1965 borough of Barking) became eastern Greater London's premier rock-music venue between 1969 and 1975, incorporating the Village Blues Club. Notable performers at the pub included Jethro Tull, Supertramp, Queen, Pink Floyd, Eric Clapton, Status Quo, and Led Zeppelin (on 5 April 1969). The Eastbrook is a Grade II* listed pub. Given the influence of U.S. blues on the English musicians who played at the Roundhouse, journalist Nik Cohn called the London of the late 1960s and early 1970s the "Dagenham Delta".

=== Media ===
The Barking & Dagenham Post is printed weekly and also published online.

== Sport ==
Dagenham & Redbridge F.C., based at Victoria Road were relegated to the National League in the 2015–16 season from Football League Two, after being relegated from the Football League One which they had reached having been promoted as playoff-winners of League two after beating Rotherham United F.C. 3–2, in the 2010–11 season. They were also the Nationwide Conference champions of the 2006–07 season.

Greyhound racing and Motorcycle speedway was staged at the Dagenham Greyhound Stadium off Ripple Road, from 1930 to 1965. The speedway club ran various events from 1932 to 1939 and a team called the Dagenham Daggers took part in challenge matches and the Sunday Dirt-Track League.

Dagenham's leading cricket club Goresbrook Cricket Club are based at the May & Baker Sports Club in Rainham Road South, in 2011 the club won the Essex County Cricket League for the first time in its history.

Dagenham has a King George's Field in memorial to King George V. The park was renamed in 1953 by Queen Elizabeth II. Dagenham also has many other parks such as Valence - and Parsloes (which lies partly in the pre-1965 borough of Barking). Dagenham Crusaders Drum and Bugle Corps, founded by John Johnson, was the first British Drum Corps and performed in the United States for the first time in 1983. In 2010 they reformed to perform for DCUK's 30th anniversary, fielding a competitive corps for the first time in 22 years.

== Dagenham Flat Fire ==
In the early hours of 26 August 2024, a fire blazed through the Spectrum Building, a tower block mostly of flats on Freshwater Road, Dagenham. Emergency services received the first report of the fire at 02:44 local time, with the first fire engine arriving at 02:49 local time. More than 100 people were evacuated, at least 20 being rescued by firefighters. 225 firefighters and at least 40 fire engines responded to the incident.

Four people were treated by ambulances at the scene, of which two were taken to hospital.

At 12:35 local time, Assistant Commissioner Patrick Goulbourne of the London Fire Brigade announced "everyone has been accounted for" and they had "Stood down the Major Incident"

The building was in the process of having 'non-compliant' cladding removed, similar to the cladding that was found on the Grenfell Tower.

== Notable people ==
Please see 'Geography' above for various definitions of 'Dagenham'.

- Actress Adelayo Adedayo was raised in Dagenham.
- Abraham Blackborne, long-serving vicar of Dagenham.
- England international footballer and World Cup-winning manager Alf Ramsey was born in Dagenham in 1920.
- St Peter and St Paul's Church, Dagenham Parish Church, was once the Parish Church of the former archbishop of Canterbury, George Carey, who lived at Dagenham during his school years.
- Musician and comedian Dudley Moore was brought up in Dagenham, which was the home of Peter Cook and Dudley Moore's famous comic alter-egos Pete and Dud.
- Sandie Shaw, a 1960s pop singer who had a string of hit singles in the decade and won the Eurovision Song Contest in 1967 with Puppet on a String, was born in Dagenham.
- Arsenal and England footballer Tony Adams grew up in Dagenham, attending both Hunters Hall Primary School and Eastbrook Comprehensive School.
- Rap artist Devlin was born in Bermondsey but grew up in Dagenham.
- Singer John Farnham was born in Dagenham, before migrating to Australia at the age of 10.
- Former darts player Wayne Mardle was born in Dagenham before living in Romford.
- English actor, musician, YouTuber and podcaster, James Buckley calls Dagenham his home town.
- British singer, TV presenter, and personality Stacey Solomon is from Dagenham.
- British singer, Steve Ignorant of the original anarcho-punk collective Crass grew up in Dagenham.
- Richard Wisker actor, was born in Dagenham.
- Chris Youlden, blues singer, was born in Dagenham.
