= Becontree tube station =

London Underground station

Becontree
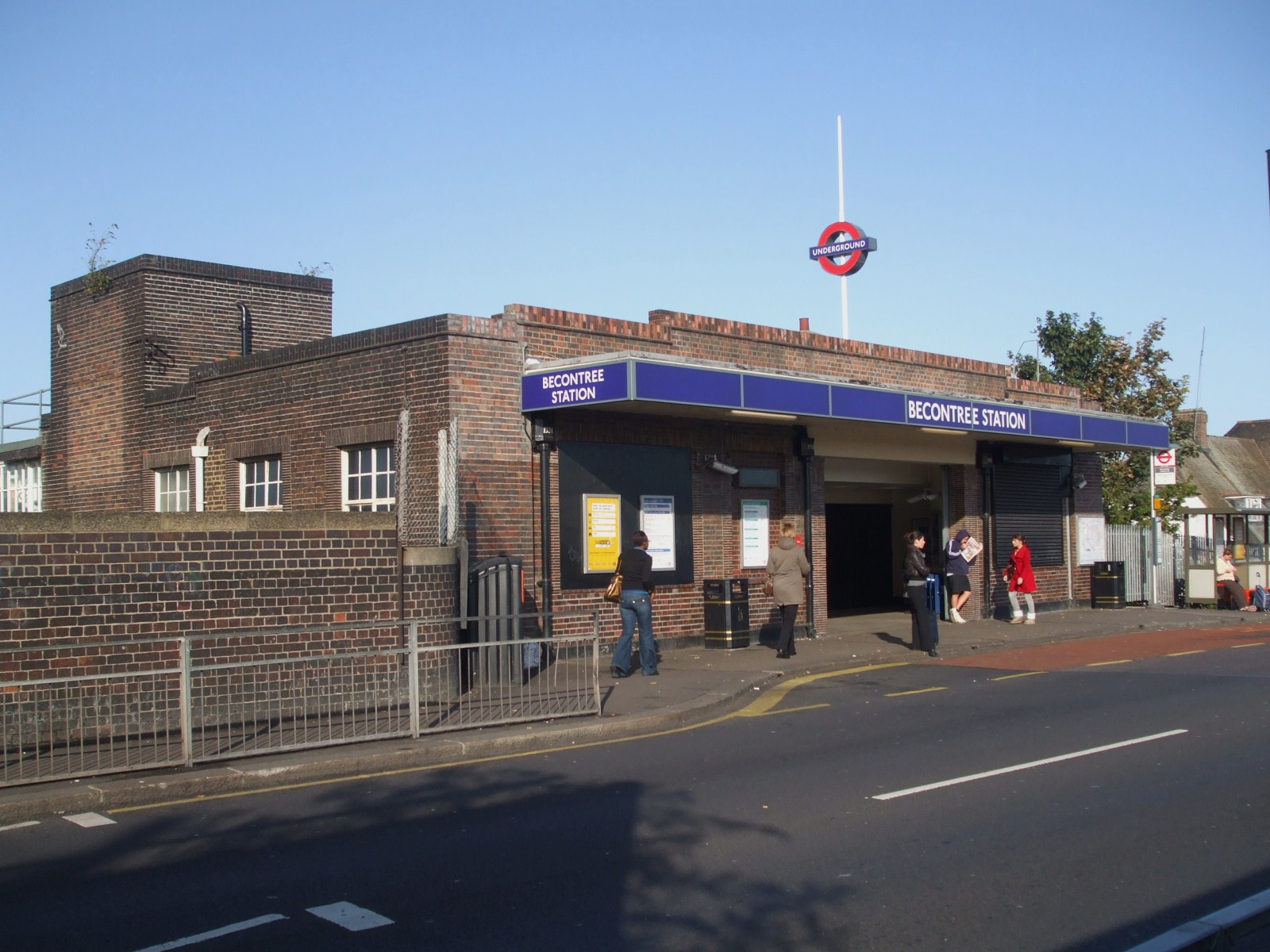
- Entrance from Gale Street

General information
- Location: Barking and Dagenham
- Coordinates: 51°32′25″N 00°07′36″E
- Owner: Transport for London
- Manager: London Underground
- Platforms: 2

Other information
- Fare zone: 5
- Website: Official website

History
- Opened: 28 June 1926
- Former names: Gale Street Halt (1926–1932)
- Original company: London, Midland and Scottish Railway

Key dates
- 12 September 1932: Expanded and District line started
- 1 January 1948: Ownership transferred to British Railways
- 14 June 1962: British Railways service withdrawn
- 1 January 1969: Ownership transferred to London Transport

Passengers

London Underground annual entry and exit
- 2021: ▼1.76 million
- 2022: ▲2.67 million
- 2023: ▲2.90 million
- 2024: ▼2.84 million
- 2025: ▲2.90 million
Location
- Location in Barking and Dagenham

Becontree (/ˈbɛkəntriː/) is a London Underground station. It is located to the south of Becontree in the London Borough of Barking and Dagenham, east London. The station is on the District line, between Upney and Dagenham Heathway stations. It is 9.1 kilometres (5.7 mi) along the line from the eastern terminus at Upminster and 25.1 kilometres (15.6 mi) to Earl's Court in central London where the line divides into numerous branches. It is in London fare zone 5. Becontree was originally opened as Gale Street Halt in 1926 by the London, Midland and Scottish Railway on the existing route from Fenchurch Street in London toward Southend. The station was renamed and completely rebuilt in 1932 with an additional pair of platforms to serve the electric District Railway (now the District line) local service. London–Southend services ceased to call at the station in the 1960s, leaving only two platforms in operation.

== History ==
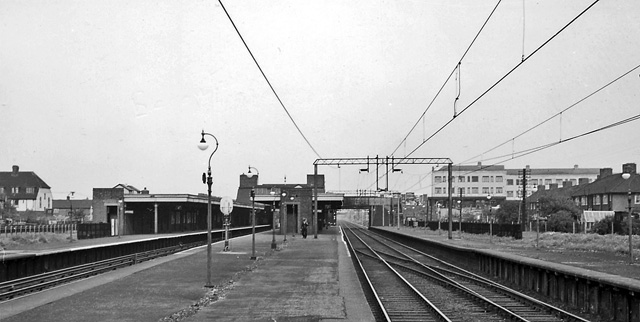
Becontree in 1961, with the former LT&SR tracks and platforms in the foreground

In 1858 a line through East Ham was constructed to provide a faster connection between Barking and the city of London, which connects to the London and Blackwall Railway route to Fenchurch Street. Between 1885 and 1888, the London, Tilbury and Southend Railway (LT&SR) constructed a line between Barking and Pitsea via Upminster to provide a more direct route between London and Southend. The station was not built at the time.

The London, Midland and Scottish Railway (LMS) took ownership of the London, Tilbury and Southend line in 1923 and the station opened as Gale Street Halt on 28 June 1926 to serve the new Becontree Estate and subsequent residential areas. Initially, there were no roads leading to the station. In 1929, the company proposed quadrupling their line between Barking and Upminster and electrifying one pair of tracks for the District line. (Note: Government assistance was provided for these works, under the Development (Loan Guarantees and Grants) Act 1929 (20 & 21 Geo. 5. c. 7).) The station was rebuilt and new platforms were constructed for the new pair of tracks. Gale Street Halt was renamed as Becontree and the new station building to the designs of the architect William Henry Hamlyn opened on 18 July 1932, with electrified District line services starting operation 2 months after on 12 September. In addition to the start of electrified services, two new adjacent stations on the District line named Upney and Heathway (now Dagenham Heathway) opened.

By 1935, there were approximately 18,000 homes in this area and the population grew to 116,000. This particular section of the line between Barking and Upminster was popular among commuters getting to West and East Ham which reduced the need for bus services. Other reasons were a shortened travel time to Charing Cross of up to 35 minutes and the good availability of trains servicing this part of the line. (Note: Lord Ashfield was initially concerned about the difficulty in generating revenue from this line but was impressed by the actual turnover. Patronage was increased by 40 per cent on the Upminster line while other lines increased by a mere 26 per cent.)

The slow tracks on the former LT&SR line to Upminster were shared with steam locomotive hauled goods and passenger services, until 1961 when the District line took over exclusive use of the DC electrified lines. LT&SR services ceased to stop at the station on 15 June 1962. On 1 January 1969 ownership of the station transferred to the London Underground.

=== Becontree Estate Railway ===
The railway here was crossed by Becontree Estate Railway, a temporary railway constructed as part of the building of the Becontree housing estate which operated between 1921 and 1934. Becontree estate was constructed in the 1920s by C. J. Wills and Sons Ltd., with the remainder completed in 1938. The estate was once to be served by high speed tramways, with services starting from Ilford, branching out into the estate and then rejoining the current line to Barking. This was not supported by Ilford and Barking councils, and was abandoned due to problems with Ilford authorities and the need to electrify the Barking to Upminster line. There was also a deferred plan for a Kearney Monorail tube connecting Becontree to the city.

== Design ==
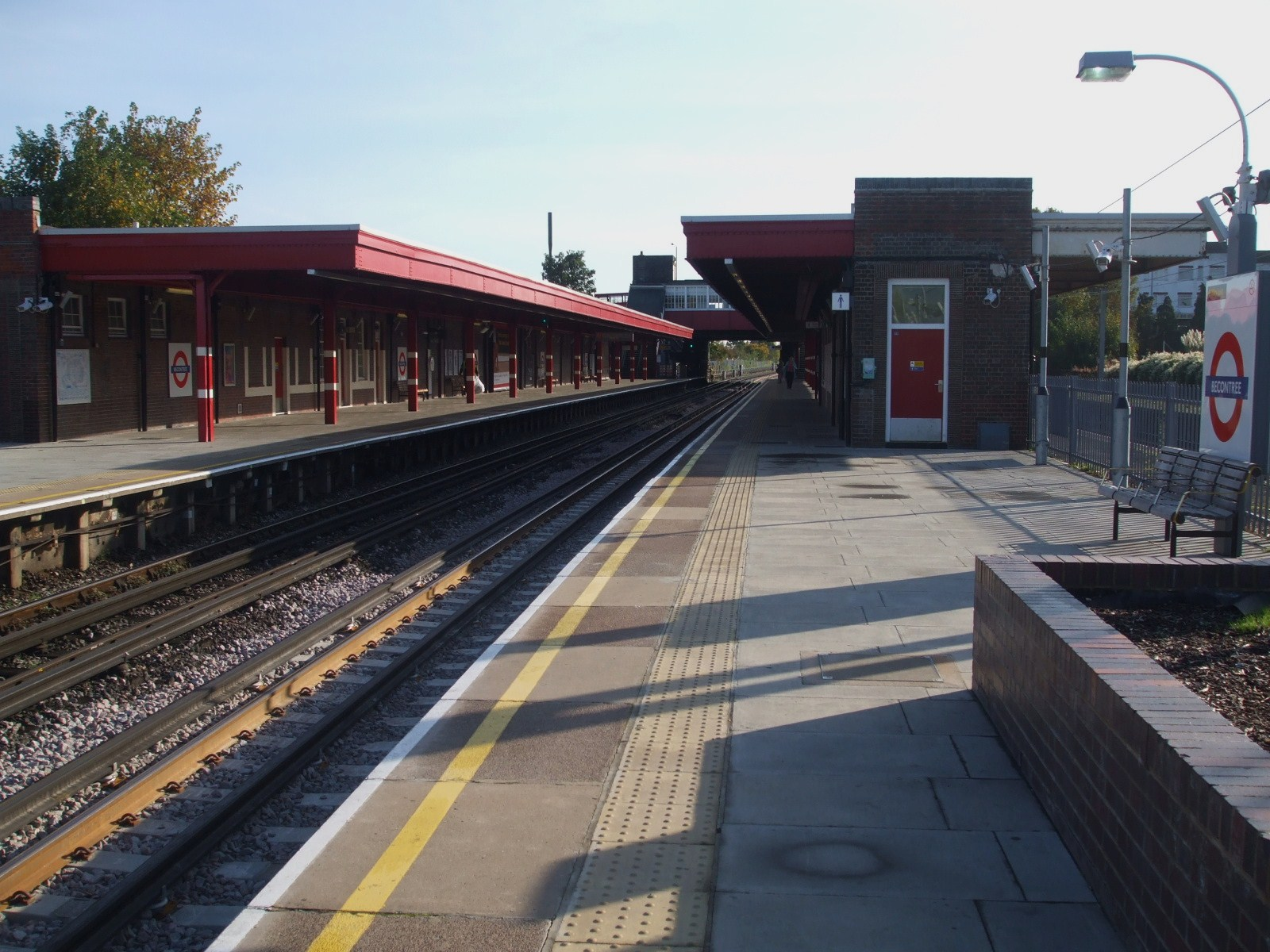
Westbound platform looking east, with the fenced off LT&SR platform visible to the right

The station has four platforms, of which two are used by the District line and another two are disused since the LT&SR service was withdrawn in 1962. One of the platforms is fenced off from the westbound District line platform. The single-storey brick station buildings are of typical 1930s design which are also constructed at Dagenham East, Hornchurch and Upminster at the time. Station refurbishment works were completed by Metronet in 2006, where heritage features were restored, CCTV equipment replaced and PA system enhanced. New wall tiles and ceilings were clad, and new tactile strips, customer Help Points and better lighting were installed. Whilst these works were done between 2005 and 2006, the station was closed on several weekends whereby replacement buses operated to Dagenham Heathway station. The station does not have step-free access from the platforms to the street, although there are two out-of-use lift shafts from the platforms to the booking hall. The station was shortlisted for step-free access work in 2025.

== Location ==
The station is located on the west side of Gale Street. It serves the residential area of Becontree, which is to the north of the station. There is a commercial area to the south of the station, while Parsloes Park is to the north. Nearby landmarks include a driving school, the Jo Richardson Community School, Roding Primary School and The James Campbell Primary School. London Bus routes 62 and 145 serve the station, providing connections to Barking, Ilford, Dagenham, and Chadwell Heath. The station is 9 miles 48 chains (15.4 km) down the line from Fenchurch Street.

== Services ==
The station is managed by London Underground. It is in London fare zone 5. The typical off-peak service from the station is 12 District line trains per hour to Upminster and 12 to Earl's Court, of which six continue to Ealing Broadway and six continue to Richmond. At peak periods the number of trains per hour increases to 15 and some trains continue from Earl's Court to Wimbledon. Services towards central London operate from approximately 05:15 to 00:00 and services to Upminster operate from approximately 05:45 to 01:15. The journey time to Upminster is approximately 11 minutes, to Barking six minutes and to Tower Hill in central London 29 minutes. With 2.90 million entries and exits in 2025, it ranked 183rd busiest London Underground station.

== Notes ==
Preceding station	London Underground	Following station
Upney towards Wimbledon, Richmond or Ealing Broadway	District line	Dagenham Heathway towards Upminster
Former services
Barking	London, Tilbury and Southend line Eastern Region of British Railways	Dagenham East
