= Dagenham East tube station =

London Underground station

Dagenham East
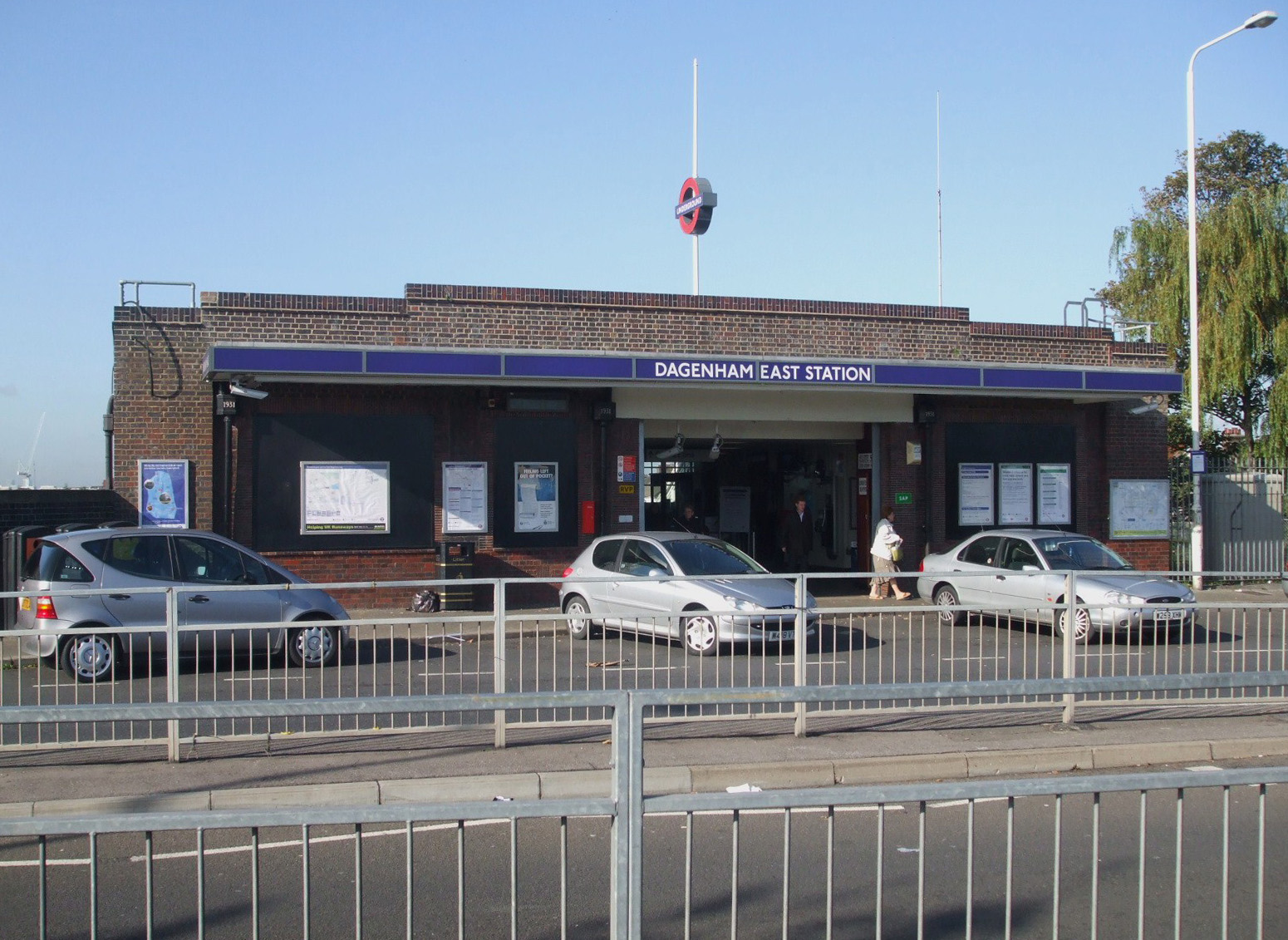
- Station entrance

General information
- Location: Dagenham, Barking and Dagenham
- Coordinates: 51.5444°N 0.1656°E
- Owner: Transport for London
- Manager: London Underground
- Platforms: 3

Other information
- Fare zone: 5
- Website: Official website

History
- Opened: 1 May 1885
- Former names: Dagenham (1885–1949)
- Original company: London, Tilbury and Southend Railway
- Pre-grouping: Midland Railway
- Post-grouping: London, Midland and Scottish Railway

Key dates
- 2 June 1902: District line started
- 30 September 1905: District line withdrawn
- 1932: Station expanded
- 12 September 1932: District line restarted
- 24 November 1935: Bay platform added
- 1 January 1948: Ownership transferred to British Railways
- 14 June 1962: British Railways service withdrawn
- 1 January 1969: Ownership transferred to London Transport

Passengers

London Underground annual entry and exit
- 2021: ▼1.50 million
- 2022: ▲2.33 million
- 2023: ▲2.65 million
- 2024: ▼2.59 million
- 2025: ▲2.73 million
Location
- Location in Barking and Dagenham

Dagenham East (/ˈdæɡənəm ˈiːst/) is a London Underground station in Dagenham in the London Borough of Barking and Dagenham, east London. It is on the District line between Dagenham Heathway and Elm Park stations. It is 6.4 kilometres (4.0 mi) along the line from the eastern terminus at Upminster and 18.3 kilometres (11.4 mi) to Tower Hill in central London. The station was originally opened as Dagenham on 1 May 1885 by the London, Tilbury and Southend Railway on a new direct route from London to Southend that avoided Tilbury. The station was rebuilt in 1932 by the London, Midland and Scottish Railway and an additional pair of platforms were constructed to serve the electric District Railway local service which was extended from Barking to Upminster. The station was renamed Dagenham East in 1949. The London–Southend service was withdrawn and the original platforms abandoned in 1962. The station is of a similar design to those constructed at Becontree and Hornchurch. It is in London fare zone 5.

== History ==
The original 1854 route of the London, Tilbury and Southend Railway (LTSR) passed through the south of the parish of Dagenham, much closer to the River Thames. The nearest station was at Rainham. Between 1885 and 1888 a new route authorised as the Barking and Pitsea Railway was constructed. It provided a direct service from Fenchurch Street to Southend, avoiding Tilbury. The George Hopkins-designed station at Dagenham opened on 1 May 1885. Through service to Southend commenced on 1 June 1888. The Whitechapel and Bow Railway opened in 1902 and allowed through services of the District Railway to operate as far as Upminster. The District Railway converted to electric trains in 1905 and services were lost at Dagenham as they were cut back to East Ham. (Note: Electric service was extended to Barking on 1 April 1908.) The LTSR was purchased by the Midland Railway in 1912. It was amalgamated into the London, Midland and Scottish Railway (LMS) on 1 January 1923.

Dagenham was served by the jointly-operated District/LMS through trains until September 1932, changing from electric District to steam LTSR locomotives at Barking. Delayed by World War I, an additional pair of electrified fourth rail tracks were extended by the London, Midland and Scottish Railway to Upminster and services of the District resumed at Dagenham in 1932. To coincide with the introduction of electric services, the station was rebuilt with two additional platforms and a new ticket office spanning the tracks facing onto Rainham Road. The station was built to the designs of LMS architect William Henry Hamlyn, drawing inspiration from London Underground station architecture. Electric train service was initially a train every 10 minutes at peak times and every 20 minutes off-peak. Trains were able to terminate at Dagenham in the down local platform and return in service westbound. Between the electric local and steam through tracks an electric siding was provided. (Note: The siding was removed as part of works to separate the electric and through lines in 1959–1960.)

The District Railway was incorporated into London Transport in 1933, and became known as the District line. A new station at Heathway became the next station to the west in 1932 and Elm Park was added to the east in 1935. To cope with the increased demand from new housing developments, some services that had been terminating at Barking were extended to a new bay platform at Dagenham from 24 November 1935. (Note: The change was needed to allow peak Metropolitan line trains to be extended eastwards to terminate at Barking.) The 1947 timetable shows only a few services a day provided by the London, Midland and Scottish Railway and a frequent service provided by the District. After nationalisation of the railways in 1948 management of the station passed to British Railways. Dagenham East was renamed to its current name in 1949. (Note: The renaming coincided with the transfer of the station from the London Midland Region to the Eastern Region. Heathway was renamed Dagenham Heathway on the same day.) The remaining Fenchurch Street–Southend services were withdrawn on 14 June 1962 with the introduction of full overhead line electric service. British Rail continued to manage the station despite providing none of the services and on 1 January 1969 ownership transferred to the London Underground.

== Design ==
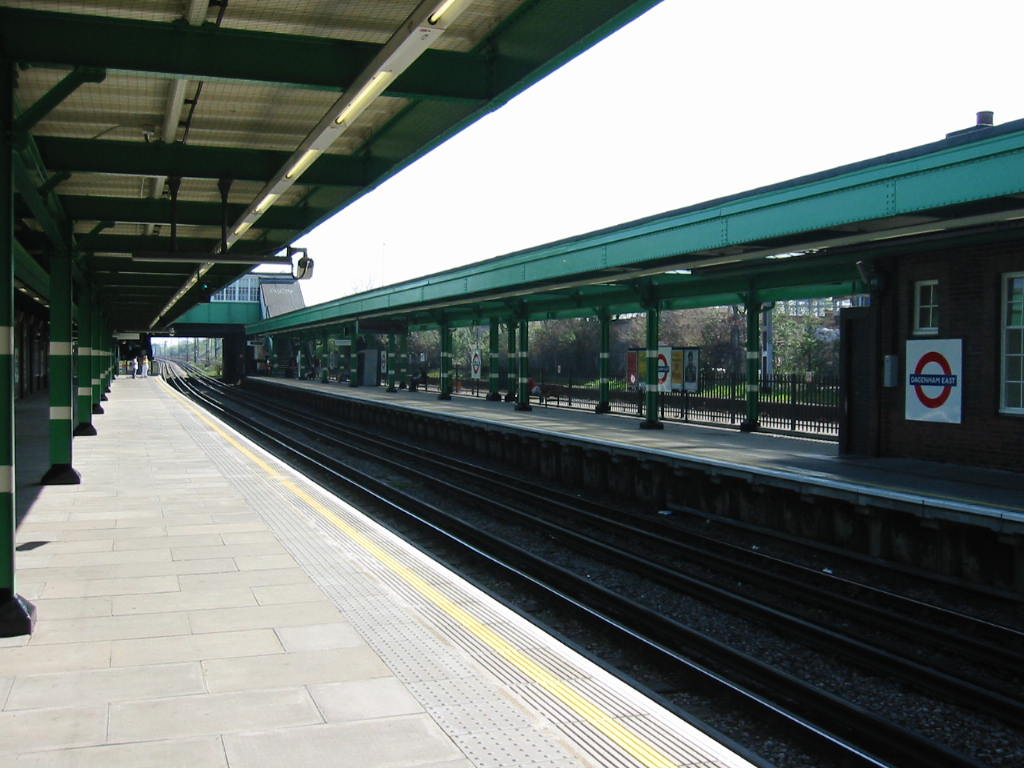
The eastbound and westbound platforms following refurbishment

There is no trace of the 1885 George Hopkins-designed station buildings, but they were similar to those still in existence at West Horndon. Two platforms with short canopies were connected by a footbridge at their eastern end. (Note: A common design was used at stations between Dagenham and Pitsea and at Ockendon.)

The station consists of three platforms on an east–west alignment. Two are side platforms—numbered 1 for westbound and 2 for eastbound—located either side of the running tracks. Platform 3 is a bay platform located to the north of the pair of running lines. Another pair of tracks to the south are used by London, Tilbury and Southend line outer suburban services and there are disused platforms on those lines. The eastbound and westbound platforms are covered by station canopies from the 1932 rebuild with waiting rooms and toilets on the platforms. The Fletton-brick ticket office is located at street level above the platforms, to which it is connected by a covered footbridge stairway. A second peak-hours station exit on the eastbound platform is now disused. The 1930s architecture is similar in design to Becontree and Hornchurch and is contemporaneous with the introduction of electric services.

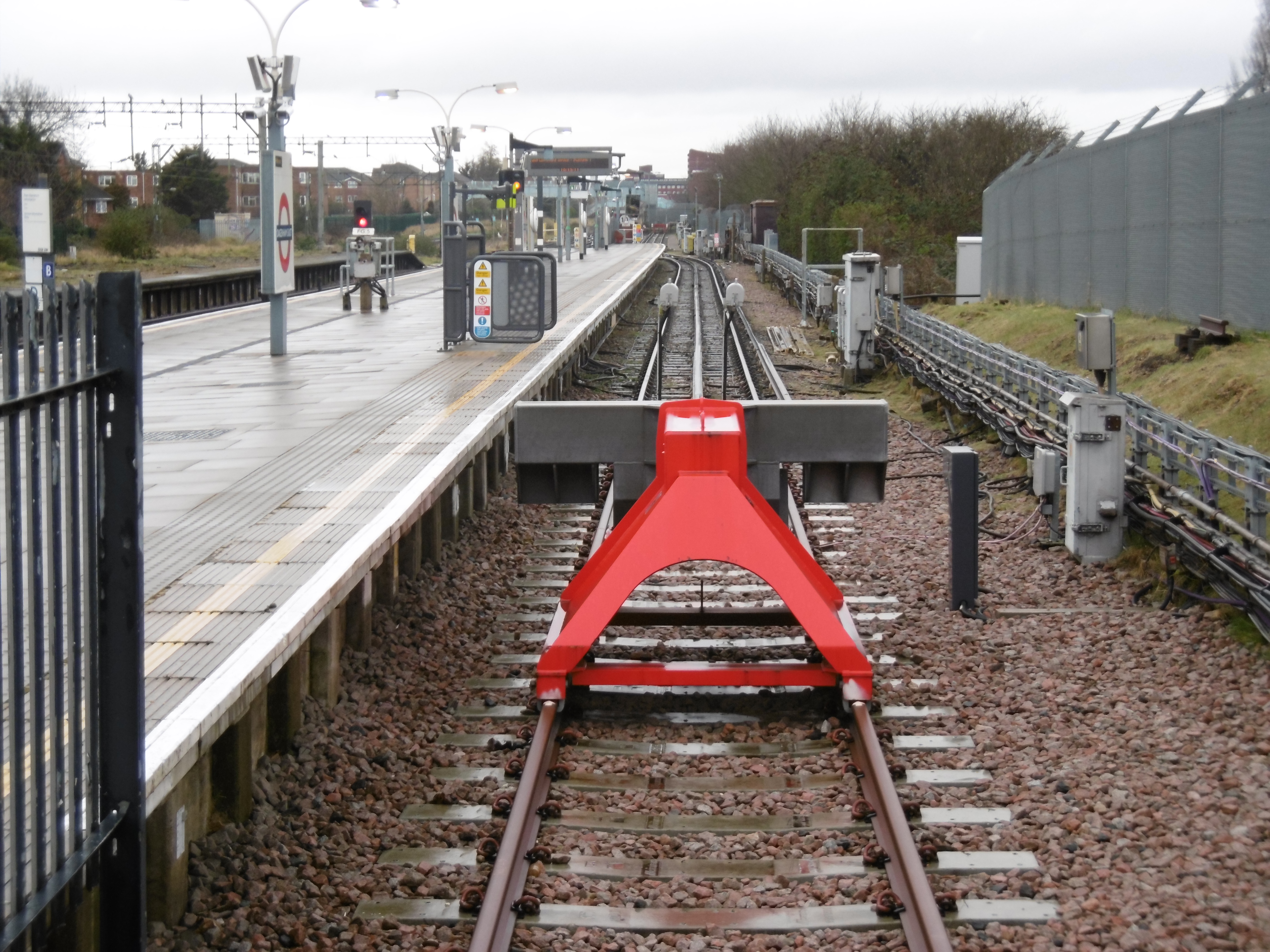
The bay platform was added in 1935

As part of the public–private partnership arrangement for maintenance of the London Underground, the station was refurbished by Metronet during 2006. Works for the refurbishment included provision of tactile strips and colour contrasted handrails for the visually impaired, installation of closed-circuit television cameras, passenger help points, new electronic departure information displays on the platforms, a new public address system and improved lighting.

== Location ==
The station is named after the town of Dagenham in which it is situated approximately 0.8 kilometres (0.5 mi) north of the historic Dagenham village. The station is located on Rainham Road South in the London Borough of Barking and Dagenham. Elm Park station is 2.4 kilometres (1.5 mi) to the east of the station and Dagenham Heathway is 1.4 kilometres (0.87 mi) to the west. It is 18.3 kilometres (11.4 mi) along the line from Tower Hill in central London and 6.4 kilometres (4.0 mi) from the eastern terminus at Upminster. The station is 11 miles 25 chains (18.2 km) down the line from Fenchurch Street. Eastbrookend Country Park is located to the east. Northeast of the station is London East Business and Technical Park and to the north is the Victoria Road stadium. London Buses routes 103 and 364 serve the station, providing connections to Romford, Rainham, Goodmayes and Ilford.

== Services ==
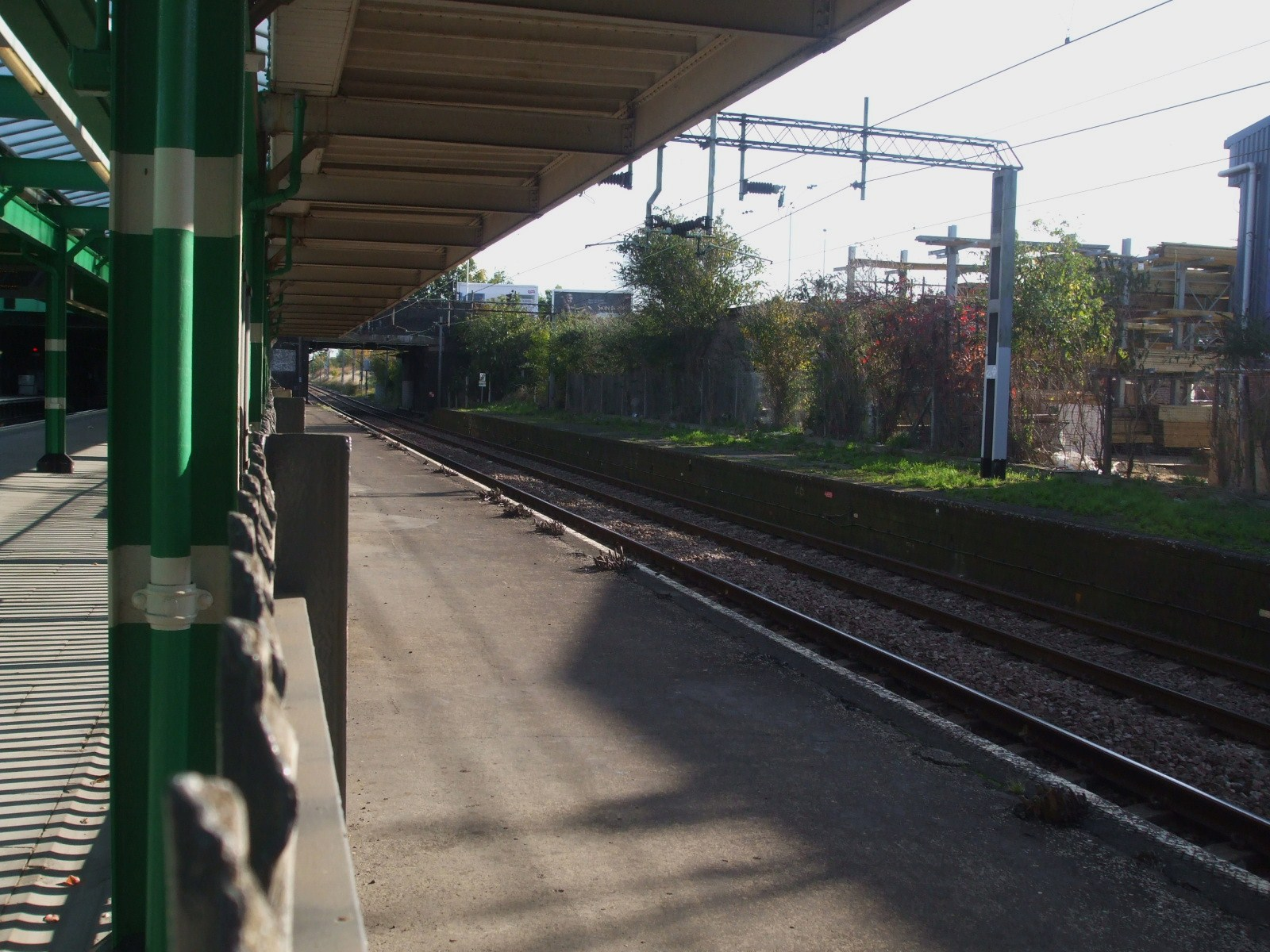
Abandoned Fenchurch Street line platforms

The station is managed by London Underground. It is in London fare zone 5. The typical off-peak service from the station is twelve District line trains per hour to Upminster and twelve to Earl's Court, of which six continue to Ealing Broadway and six continue to Richmond. At peak periods some trains continue from Earl's Court to Wimbledon and additional services operate from the bay platform. Services towards central London operate from approximately 05:00 to 23:45 and services to Upminster operate from approximately 06:00 to 01:30. The journey time to Upminster is ten minutes, to Barking is ten minutes, and to Tower Hill is approximately 34 minutes. With 2.73 million entries and exits in 2025, it was ranked the 189th busiest London Underground station.

== Future ==
In 2015, Barking and Dagenham London Borough Council proposed the platforms on the National Rail Fenchurch Street–Southend route should be re-opened to provide interchange with c2c services, in connection with the Barking Riverside redevelopment to the south of the station. In 2022 Barking and Dagenham Council restated its aspirations for the reinstated platforms at Dagenham East. In 2025 Barking and Dagenham Council called for Transport for London (TfL) to make the station fully accessible. In 2025 the station was shortlisted by TfL for works to make it step-free, subject to a feasibility study and available funding.

== See also ==
- Dagenham East rail crash

== Notes ==
Preceding station	London Underground	Following station
Dagenham Heathway towards Wimbledon, Richmond or Ealing Broadway	District line	Elm Park towards Upminster
Former services
Becontree	London, Tilbury and Southend line Eastern Region of British Railways	Hornchurch
