= Becontree Estate Railway =

Temporary railway system in England

The Becontree Estate Railway was a temporary railway system built in the area between Chadwell Heath and the River Thames to facilitate the construction of what became known as the Becontree Estate. The railway, which used standard gauge steam locomotives, operated between 1921 and 1934.

== Becontree housing estate ==
Between 1921 and 1932 the London County Council developed a public housing estate on land between Barking and Dagenham: when completed it consisted of 27,000 dwellings. With a population of over 100,000, it was, and remains, the largest public housing development in the world.

The name Becontree was not used for a settlement at that time, but the estate was named after the ancient Becontree hundred, which historically covered the area. The site occupied 3,000 acres of farmland and market gardens, and was entirely rural in character.

The initial contract was for 2,900 houses, and was awarded to C J Wills & Sons Ltd, a long-established family concern; Wills was awarded further contracts and ultimately built over 25,000 houses for a total cost of £13,455,000.

At its peak, the site employed 6,000 workmen and houses were completed at the rate of 97 per week.

== A temporary railway ==
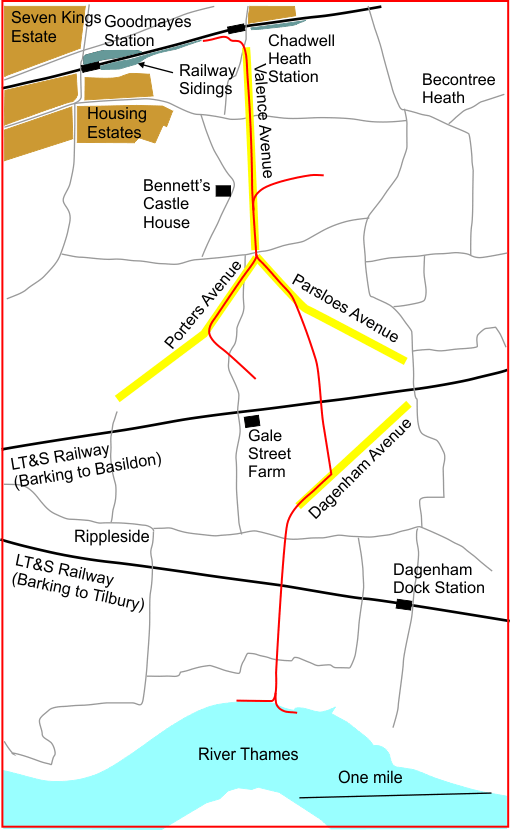
The estate railway

The area had a very limited transport network; although three railway lines crossed from west to east, the very limited road system consisted of country lanes—shown in grey on the diagram. (Except in the Seven Kings estate areas, there were no other roads in the district prior to the construction.)

Experience in trench warfare in Belgium and France during World War I had shown that temporary railway systems were efficient in bringing and removing materials in difficult terrain.

Wills & Sons established a temporary railway, connecting with existing goods sidings at Goodmayes on the Great Eastern Railway main line. Running east to near Chadwell Heath, it then turned broadly south through the future estate, to a 500 feet (150 m) jetty on the Thames, a little to the west of the area known as Horse Shoe Corner. The total distance was somewhat over 3 miles.

As well as bringing materials in by train via Goodmayes, gravel and aggregate were brought in to the jetty; this was 500 feet long and capable of handling seven barges; there were four steam cranes.

In addition, two gravel pits were created within the area of the construction itself, and these were served by short branches of the rail network.

Wills & Sons acquired a fleet of thirteen industrial locomotives for the work, and also a number of wagons for the internal conveyance of materials from the gravel pits and from the jetty; materials arriving via the main line railway were conveyed in the carriers' wagons, but these could not be detained on the Estate network unless a demurrage charge was paid.

It was estimated that over 4 million tons of materials were delivered to the site.

== Route ==
The route of the main line of the railway is shown on the diagram; numerous spurs and short branches were added as work locations moved around. It is likely that the main line itself was moved to suit the progress of the work. A good indication of the railway alignment in 1927 is at image no 017649. Other images from 1928 appear to show completed housing, with no indication of the railway.

Running from the sidings on the up side (south) of the line at the eastern end of Goodmayes station, the line ran parallel eastwards almost to Chadwell Heath passenger station and then crossing the area now occupied by the station car park and turning south to cross Chitty's Lane (now Station Road) on a skew, and heading almost due south; its alignment is the present day Valence Avenue: the railway came first, and the new road was formed as an early dual carriageway, straddling the railway line, which was in a central reservation.

It crossed Green Lane, and a gated level crossing was formed here; further south, when Becontree Avenue was later built, a level crossing was provided here too. The line continued as far as Wood Lane, where there was another level crossing. The main line then turned south-east along what became Parsloes Avenue, turning south at about the intersection with the present Raydons Road. It crossed the London Tilbury & Southend Railway (Note: The London Tilbury & Southend Railway company was purchased by the Midland Railway in 1912. It retained its individuality and continued to be known informally by its original name (or usually simply "the LT&S"); but from 1912 official documentation, and Ordnance Survey maps, referred to it as the Midland Railway, and after 1923 the London Midland & Scottish Railway (LMS).) line on a temporary bridge at about the site of the present Hatfield Road footbridge.

Continuing south it turned south-west and Dagenham Avenue was later formed on its course. The line turned south again a little north of Ripple Road, and ran directly to the River Thames, crossing the Tilbury railway line on a temporary timber trestle bridge.

At the river's edge, the line turned east alongside a wharf. The wharf was close to the river bank, and was only accessible at higher tide levels. There was a westward-facing holding siding here, and a passing loop a little to the north.

There were two semi-permanent branches: one led eastwards to a gravel pit near the site of Valence Moat; the pit yielded 600,000 tons of sand and gravel before exhaustion, after which it was filled in with domestic refuse. Another ran south-west from Wood Lane; its alignment became Porters Avenue; it turned into another gravel pit, which is now the pond in Parsloes Park. The two pits had stone crushing plant and coating machinery for making Tarmacadam for road surfacing.

Goodmayes and Chadwell Heath were the interchange points with the existing main line network; at that time the Great Eastern main line was already quadruple track, and extensive goods sidings were available at Goodmayes.

== Locomotives ==
A total of thirteen locomotives operated on the railway; they were all industrial type saddle tank locomotives, some of them purchased new for the work:

Name	Wheel arrangement	Built	Final activity
Lord Mayor	0-4-0 ST	1893	Preserved on Keighley & Worth Valley Railway (Note: Currently (2012) "On display at Ingrow West awaiting overhaul")
Dagenham	0-4-0 ST	1925	Scrapped Grays 1955
Somerton	0-4-0 ST	1903	Scrapped Durham 1950
Frances	0-4-0 ST	1895	Scrapped Wennington, Essex 1939
Southsea	0-4-0 ST	1879	St Helens 1960
Becontree	0-4-0 ST	1925	NCB Audley 1958
Barry	0-6-0 ST	1896	Port Sunlight 1952
Bombay	0-6-0 ST	1906	Dagenham Dock 1956
Cecil Levita	0-6-0 ST	1926	Dodworth Colliery 1961
Swansea	0-6-0 ST	1876	Grays, date unknown
Dunston	0-6-0 ST	1899	Isleworth 1955
Partington	0-6-0 ST	1888	Not known
Forth	0-6-0 ST	1924	Not known

There is a photograph of Lord Mayor in action at. Swansea and Cecil Levita are each depicted in photographs in Dave Brennand's book

Adjacent to Wills depot at Chadwell Heath, there was a four-track engine shed, capable of accommodating all the locomotives. There was a workshop for maintaining the locomotives and the internal wagon fleet, as well as the construction plant in use on the contract.

== Dismantling ==
As the work neared completion, the railway was progressively dismantled. In 1933 and 1934 Wills auctioned off much of the fleet; the locomotive Lord Mayor was finally engaged on recovering material from the track and wharf.

Wills went on to undertake another large housing contract for the London County Council, at St Helier in south-west London.

== Public passenger transport ==
The creation of a very large area of urban housing generated a demand for public transport for the residents; many workers continued in their former employment in East London. (The Ford Motor Company's works at Dagenham was established in 1931.) It was estimated that 35% of the estate's workers travelled between 5 and 10 miles to work, and 32% 10 to 15 miles A The established stations at Chadwell Heath and Goodmayes were already competent, but to the south of the new estate the LT&S line had no station.

The Midland Railway (owners of the LT&S line) responded by opening Gale Street Halt where Gale Street crossed its line, in 1926, but its capacity was limited. They planned quadrupling of their line and this was inaugurated on 12 September 1932. The new frequent services were operated by the electric trains of the Metropolitan District Railway, which was incorporated into the London Passenger Transport Board the following year.

The new District Railway's line ran immediately adjacent, on the north side, to the existing LT&S line, and the old and new stations formed a single four-track station unit, renamed Becontree. The LT&S service continued in operation until 1962, from which time only the District Line trains—nowadays the District Line of Transport for London—serve the station.
