= Dagenham Heathway tube station =

London Underground station

Dagenham Heathway
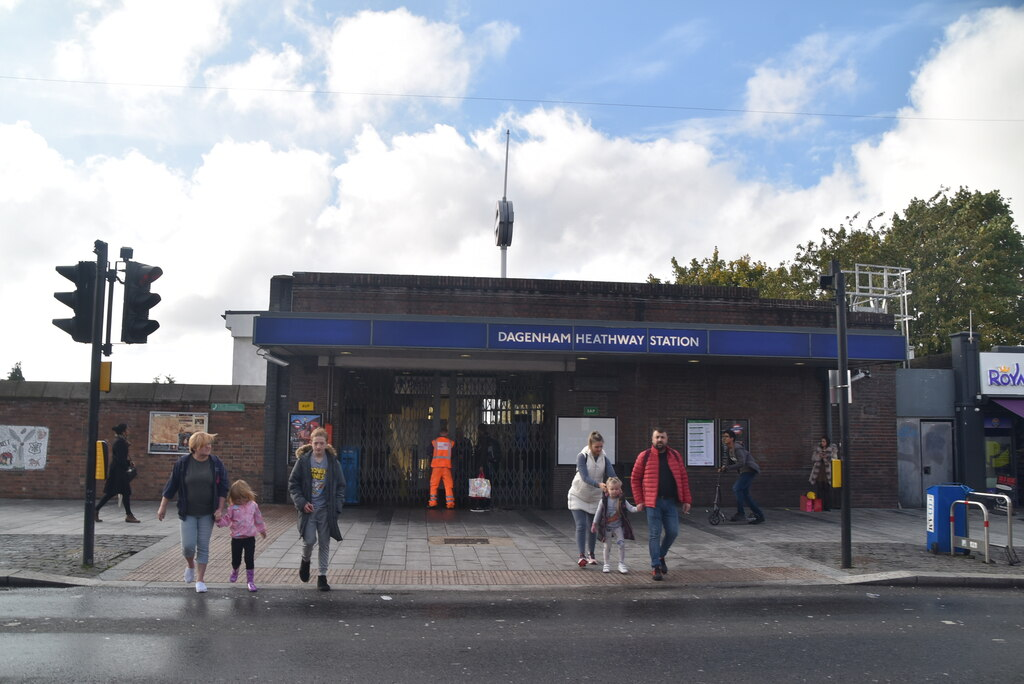
- Station entrance on Heathway

General information
- Location: Dagenham, Barking and Dagenham
- Coordinates: 51.54166°N 0.14694°E
- Owner: Transport for London
- Manager: London Underground
- Platforms: 2

Construction
- Accessible: Yes

Other information
- Fare zone: 5
- Website: Official website

History
- Opened: 12 September 1932
- Former names: Heathway (1932–1949)
- Original company: London, Midland and Scottish Railway

Key dates
- 1 January 1948: Ownership transferred to British Railways
- 1 January 1969: Ownership transferred to London Transport

Passengers

London Underground annual entry and exit
- 2021: ▼2.87 million
- 2022: ▲4.45 million
- 2023: ▲4.83 million
- 2024: ▼4.71 million
- 2025: ▲4.74 million
Location
- Location in Barking and Dagenham

Dagenham Heathway (/ˈdæɡənəm ˈhiːθweɪ/) is a London Underground station in Dagenham in the London Borough of Barking and Dagenham, east London. It is on the District line between Becontree to the west and Dagenham East to the east. It is 7.7 kilometres (4.8 mi) along the line from the eastern terminus at Upminster and 17.0 kilometres (10.6 mi) to Tower Hill in Central London. The station was originally opened as Heathway on 12 September 1932 by the London, Midland and Scottish Railway with an additional pair of tracks that were constructed to serve the electric District Railway local service from Barking to Upminster. The single-storey brick building is of a common design also constructed at other stations on the eastern portion of the line. It was renamed to its current name on 1 May 1949. The station was refurbished by Metronet during 2006. It is in London fare zone 5.

== History ==
The original route of the London, Tilbury and Southend Railway from Forest Gate Junction on the Eastern Counties Railway was constructed through the Dagenham area in 1854, with the nearest stations 4.6 kilometres (2.9 mi) at Barking and 4 kilometres (2.5 mi) a Rainham. A new more direct route between Barking and Pitsea was constructed between 1885 and 1888. It passed through the site of the current Dagenham Heathway station but a station was not built at that time. The Whitechapel and Bow Railway opened in 1902 and allowed through services of the District Railway to operate to Upminster. The District converted to electric trains in 1905 and services were cut back to East Ham. (Note: Electric service was extended to Barking on 1 April 1908.) Delayed by World War I, electrified tracks were extended by the London, Midland and Scottish Railway (LMS) to Upminster and District Railway services resumed on 12 September 1932.

The new tracks built by the London, Midland and Scottish Railway allowed additional intermediate stations to be constructed on the local lines. Increased local demand was caused by the building of the Becontree estate by the London County Council (LCC) during the interwar period. In 1920 the Heathway site for a station had been identified by the Midland Railway and the LCC. The infill station was opened with platforms on the local electric lines on 12 September 1932. The station was built to the designs of LMS architect William Henry Hamlyn, drawing inspiration from London Underground station architecture. The station was operated by the London, Midland and Scottish Railway but was almost exclusively served by District Railway trains. (Note: Two daily steam services to Fenchurch Street were provided for very early morning workers.) Electric train service was initially a train every 10 minutes at peak times and every 20 minutes off-peak. The District Railway was incorporated into London Transport in 1933 and became known as the District line. After nationalisation of the railways in 1948 management of the station passed to British Railways. Dagenham Council pushed for a renaming to 'Dagenham Central' and the station was renamed Dagenham Heathway on 1 May 1949. (Note: The renaming coincided with the transfer of the station from the London Midland Region to the Eastern Region.) On 1 January 1969 ownership of the station transferred to the London Underground.

== Design ==
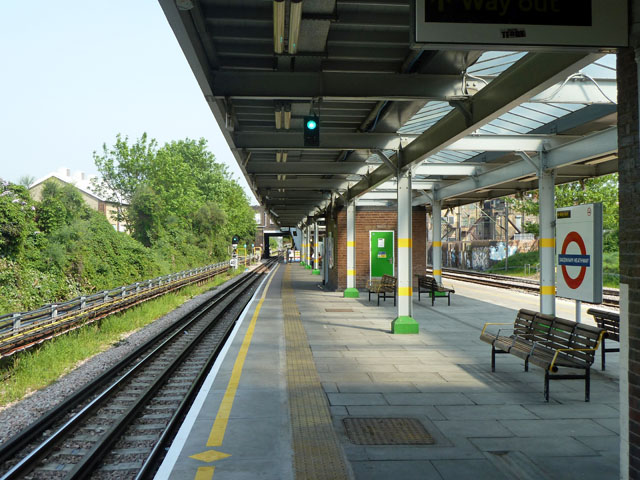
Station platforms with the eastbound track to the left

The station consists of a central island platform—numbered 1 for westbound and 2 for eastbound—between the running tracks. There are four tracks through the site although there are no platforms for the London, Tilbury and Southend line. The platforms are 700 feet (210 m) in length with the 400 feet (120 m) section currently in operational use under a single canopy supported by columns. There is a central waiting room and public toilet.

The ticket office is located on the bridge above platform level, to which it is connected by a long sloping walkway. The symmetry of the station facade was destroyed in the 1970s when 50 feet (15 m) of the building was removed to accommodate an adjacent building. There is step-free access from the platform to the street. The layout is almost the twin of Upney, opened the same day, although the platform buildings provided at Heathway were longer. As part of the public–private partnership arrangement for maintenance of the London Underground, the station was refurbished by Metronet during 2005. Works included provision of tactile strips and colour contrasted handrails for the visually impaired, installation of closed-circuit television cameras, passenger help points, new electronic departure information displays on the platforms, a new public address system and improved lighting.

== Location ==
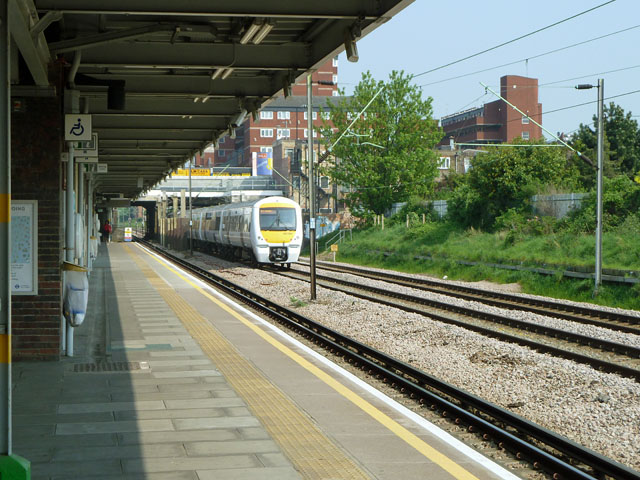
Eastbound platform with the Fenchurch Street–Southend tracks to the right

The station is named after the town of Dagenham in which it is located and the Heathway principal shopping street on which it is situated, in the London Borough of Barking and Dagenham. The station is served by London Buses routes 145, 173, 174, 175 and 364, providing connections to Barking, Beckton, Goodmayes, Harold Hill, Ilford, Leytonstone and Romford.

Dagenham East station is 1.4 kilometres (0.87 mi) to the east of the station and Becontree is 1.4 kilometres (0.87 mi) to the west. It is 17.0 kilometres (10.6 mi) along the line from Tower Hill in central London and 7.7 kilometres (4.8 mi) from the eastern terminus at Upminster. The station is 10 miles 36 chains (16.8 km) down the line from Fenchurch Street.

== Services ==
The station is managed by London Underground. It is in London fare zone 5. The typical off-peak service from the station is 12 District line trains per hour to Upminster and 12 to Earl's Court, of which six continue to Ealing Broadway and six continue to Richmond. At peak periods the number of trains per hour increases to 15 and some trains continue from Earl's Court to Wimbledon. Services towards central London operate from approximately 05:00 to 00:00 and services to Upminster operate from approximately 05:45 to 01:30. With 4.74 million entries and exits in 2025, it was ranked 130th busiest London Underground station. It was the busiest intermediate station between Barking and Upminster.

== Notes ==
Preceding station	London Underground	Following station
Becontree towards Wimbledon, Richmond or Ealing Broadway	District line	Dagenham East towards Upminster
