= Becontree =

Area of Greater London, England

Coordinates: 51.5487°N 0.1427°E

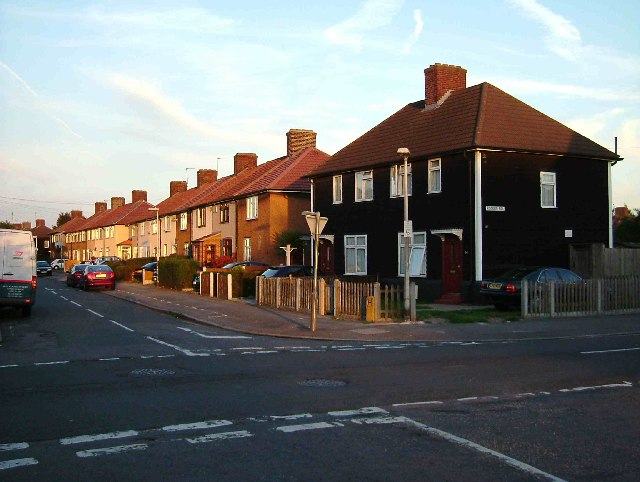
- Houses built by the London County Council

- Location within Greater London
- Area: 4 sq mi (10 km^{2})
- Population: 95,862 (2011 wards)
  - Density: 23,966/sq mi (9,253/km^{2})
- OS grid reference: TQ485855
  - Charing Cross: 11 mi (18 km) WSW
- London borough: Barking & Dagenham
- Ceremonial county: Greater London
- Region: London
- Country: England
- Sovereign state: United Kingdom
- Post town: DAGENHAM
- Postcode district: RM8
- Dialling code: 020
- Police: Metropolitan
- Fire: London
- Ambulance: London
- UK Parliament: Barking; Dagenham and Rainham
- London Assembly: City and East

Becontree (/ˈbɛkəntriː/ or /ˈbiːkəntriː/ (Note: Both pronunciations are given as Received Pronunciation in the Longman Pronunciation Dictionary, but the form /ˈbɛkəntriː/ is prioritised (Wells, J. C. (2008). Longman Pronunciation Dictionary (3 ed.). Harlow, England: Pearson Education Ltd. p. 75. ISBN 9781405881180.). The dialectologist Peter Wright wrote in 1981 that /ˈbiːkəntriː/ is the traditional pronunciation in the cockney dialect (Wright, Peter (1981). Cockney Dialect and Slang. London: B.T. Batsford Ltd. p. 75.))) is an area of the London Borough of Barking and Dagenham, England, 11 miles (17.7 km) northeast of Charing Cross. It was constructed between 1921 and 1935 as the largest public housing estate in the world. The Housing, Town Planning, &c. Act 1919 allowed London County Council to build housing outside the County of London and Becontree was designed to cottage estate principles in Barking, Dagenham and Ilford, then in the administrative county of Essex. The official completion of the estate was celebrated in 1935, by which time the estate had a population of around 100,000 people in 26,000 homes.

The building of the estate caused a huge increase in population density, which led to demands on services and reforms of local government. An additional 1,000 houses were added in later phases. The estate had no industrial and very little commercial development until the May & Baker and Ford Dagenham sites opened nearby, and a shopping area was built at Heathway. The estate has formed part of Greater London since 1965, when the Barking section was combined with Dagenham, and has been within a single London borough since boundary changes caused the Ilford section to be transferred from Redbridge to Barking and Dagenham in 1994.

== History ==
=== Toponymy ===
The estate is named after the ancient Becontree Hundred, which historically covered the area. It is recorded in the Domesday Book of 1086. The name is Old English and means 'tree of a man named Beohha'. The tree would have stood on Becontree Heath, just outside the eastern boundary of the estate. The majority of the estate was in the parish of Dagenham and the whole estate is in the Dagenham post town, and the two names are used interchangeably.

=== Building of the estate ===
Because of the lack of available land in the County of London, the Housing, Town Planning, &c. Act 1919 permitted the London County Council (LCC) to build housing and act as landlord outside of its territory. On 18 June 1919 the London County Council's Standing Committee on the Housing of the Working Classes resolved to build 29,000 dwellings to accommodate 145,000 people within 5 years, of which 24,000 were to be at Becontree. Becontree was developed between 1921 and 1935 as a large cottage estate of around 26,000 homes, intended to be "homes fit for heroes" for World War I veterans.

Most of the land at that time was market gardens, with occasional groups of cottages and some country lanes. It was compulsorily purchased. 4,000 houses had been completed by 1921. The early residents were able to pick rhubarb, peas and cabbages from the abandoned market gardens.

LCC cottage estates 1918–1939
Estate name	Area	No of dwellings	Population 1938	Population density
Pre-1914
Norbury	11	218	867	19.8 per acre (49/ha)
Old Oak	32	736	3519	23 per acre (57/ha)
Totterdown Fields	39	1262	—	32.4 per acre (80/ha)
Tower Gardens; White Hart Lane	98	783	5936	8 per acre (20/ha)
1919–1923
Becontree	2770	25769 (Note: Source says 2589 – transcription error)	115652	9.3 per acre (23/ha)
Bellingham	252	2673	12004	10.6 per acre (26/ha)
Castelnau	51	644	2851	12.6 per acre (31/ha)
Dover House Estate; Roehampton Estate	147	1212	5383	8.2 per acre (20/ha)
1924–1933
Downham	600	7096	30032	11.8 per acre (29/ha)
Mottingham	202	2337	9009	11.6 per acre (29/ha)
St Helier	825	9068	39877	11 per acre (27/ha)
Watling	386	4034	19110	10.5 per acre (26/ha)
Wormholt	68	783	4078	11.5 per acre (28/ha)
1934–1939
Chingford (Note: Part of a larger PRC estate around Huntsman Road)	217	1540	—	7.1 per acre (18/ha)
Hanwell (Ealing)	140	1587	6732	11.3 per acre (28/ha)
Headstone Lane	142	n.a	5000	
Kenmore Park	58	654	2078	11.3 per acre (28/ha)
Thornhill (Royal Borough of Greenwich)	21	380	1598	18.1 per acre (45/ha)
Whitefoot Lane (Downham)	49	n.a	n.a.	
Source: Yelling, J. A. (1995). "Banishing London's slums: The interwar cottage estates" (PDF). Transactions. 46. London and Middlesex Archeological Society: 167–173. Quotes: Rubinstein, 1991, Just like the country.

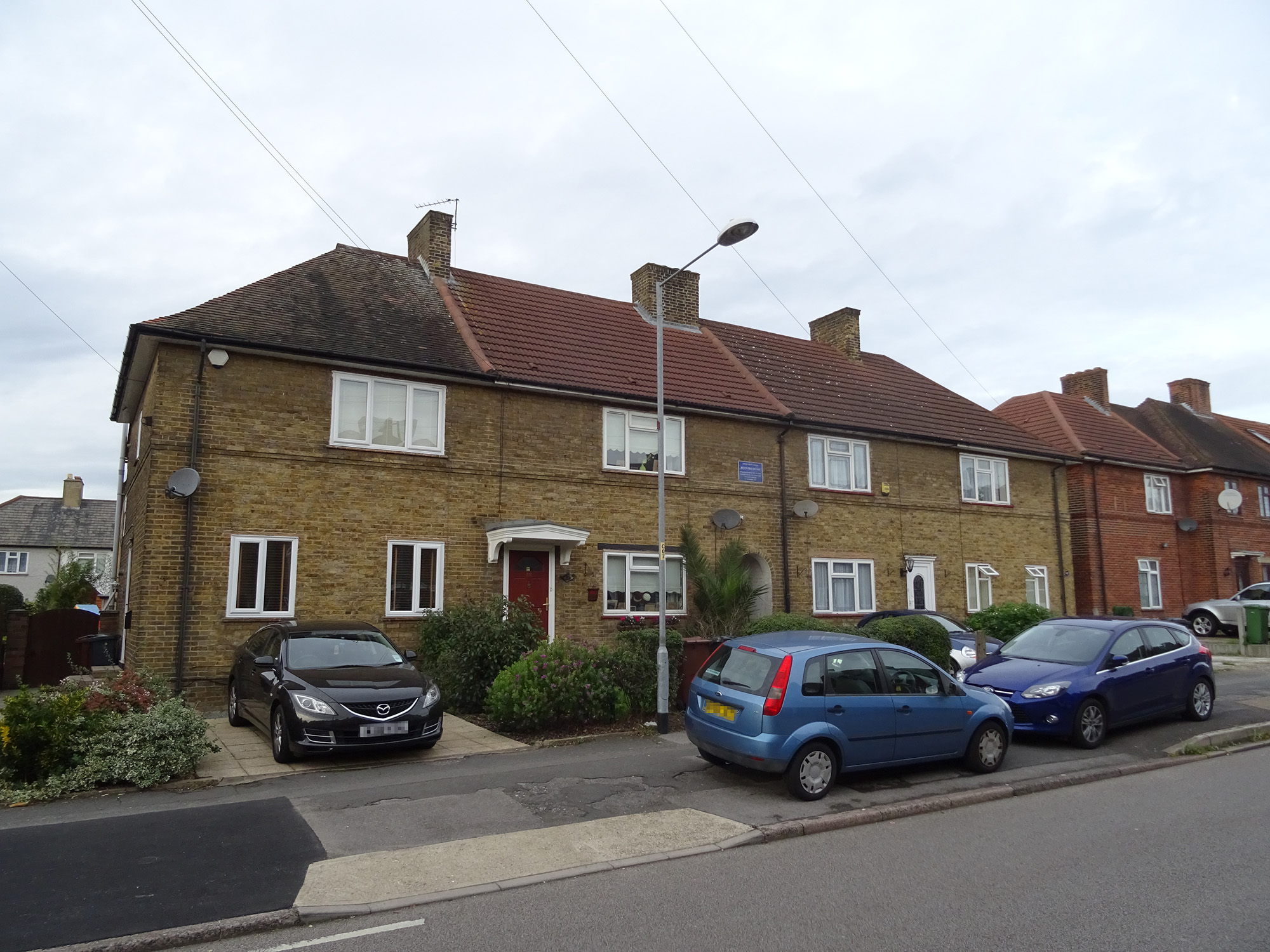
22-28 Chittys Lane Becontree

The very first houses completed, in Chittys Lane, are recognisable by a blue council plaque embedded in the wall. The construction was an enormous civil engineering project. A special railway was built especially for the building work. It connected the railway sidings at Goodmayes on the Great Eastern line and a wharf with a new 500 ft jetty, on the River Thames. Four steam cranes on the jetty could unload building material from seven barges at a time. The building of the estate took longer than anticipated. The LCC hoped to build 24,000 homes by 1924. They were only able to achieve 3,000 and the works were extended into three phases lasting until 1935.

Phase	Dates	Location	Houses built	Cumulative total
I	1921–1924	Ilford (some in Dagenham)	3,000	3,000
II	1924–1930	Dagenham (some in Ilford)	15,000	18,000
III	1930–1935	Barking	7,736	25,736
Additional	1937		800	26,536
Heath Park	1949–1951	Dagenham	600	27,136

On 13 July 1935 the official completion of the estate was celebrated with the ceremonial opening of Parsloes Park by MP Christopher Addison. However, the demand for housing meant that a further 800 homes were built in 1937. With a population of 115,652, it was the largest public housing development in the world. After the Second World War, between 1949 and 1951, 600 additional houses were built by the LCC in Dagenham in an area called Heath Park, adjacent to the estate.

Wythenshawe, in Manchester with an area of approximately 11 square miles (28 km^{2}), is larger but the population density is lower. At times Wythenshawe has also claimed to be the largest council housing estate in Europe. Private home ownership in the area has grown, and Wythenshawe has continued to expand.

=== First tenants ===
The LCC built the estate to rehouse people from London's East End, who were displaced by slum clearance. The first residents were almost all relatively prosperous working-class families, such as factory workers and busmen. Prospective tenants were interviewed by London County Council officials in their homes to check their suitability and the size of family, their domestic standards and financial resources. The tenants came from the skilled working class in relatively secure jobs and earning slightly more than the average wage. At the time everyone marvelled at having indoor toilets and a private garden, although the sash windows were extremely draughty, there was no insulation in the attics, and during the winter months very few people could afford enough coal to heat the bedrooms. The toilet, bath tap and a tap in the kitchen over a copper boiler, which was used for both washing clothes and heating bath water, were all fed from a reservoir tank in the attic, which invariably froze on winter mornings, leaving the toilets unusable. One clause in the contract of tenancy stipulated that children born to parents living on the estate would not be housed by the LCC and when the time came for them to establish their own homes, the relevant local authority would be expected to provide housing.

Privet hedges (referred to as "evergreens" or "evers") were planted along the pavements at the end of every front garden and during the spring and summer months a squad of gardeners were employed to keep them in regulation height. Although the estate regulations stipulated that the gardens must be maintained in order, more than a few degenerated into virtual jungles. However, to encourage the application of this rule, prizes were awarded for the best kept gardens. Initial candidates were selected by the rent collectors during their weekly rounds and a committee decided on the final prizes, which ranged from ten shillings consolation prizes up to £20 (an average week's rent in 1953 was about £1 18/- (£1.90)) for the first prize in each ward, plus a notice placed in the centre of the lawn for the benefit of passers-by.

=== Local government ===
When built, the development occupied parts of the parishes of Barking, Dagenham and Ilford, with administration split between the three respective urban district councils. Barking and Ilford were established as suburbs of London and had been urban districts since 1894. Dagenham was almost entirely rural until the building of the estate, having a population of only 9,127 in 1911 and growing to 89,362 in ten years. It gained urban district status in 1926. Approximately 50% of the estate was in Dagenham, 33% in Barking and 17% in Ilford. Ilford was incorporated as a municipal borough in 1926, Barking in 1931 and Dagenham in 1938. Services such as education and libraries were provided by Essex County Council throughout the estate. However, the division of responsibilities allowed for the local councils to provide elementary education in their areas as their populations were high enough. (Note: This was known as a 'Part III authority' under the Education Act 1902 and an 'excepted district' under the Education Act 1944.) Before the Second World War Barking and Ilford, but not Dagenham, were providing elementary education. However, Dagenham was permitted to provide its own library service. After the Second World War Dagenham also provided elementary education. During the 1920s and 1930s there was periodic discussion and review of the local government arrangements in the area, including proposals to merge the three districts, or transfer the estate to the County of London, but it was not acted on.

The area was within the Metropolitan Police District. It was considered to form part of the Greater London conurbation for census reporting and in 1957 formed part of the review area of the Royal Commission on Local Government in Greater London. The 1960 report of the commission recommended that Barking and Dagenham should form as a single London borough and this became the London Borough of Barking in 1965 following the London Government Act 1963. Ilford became part of the new London Borough of Redbridge. Barking was renamed Barking and Dagenham in 1980. It was anticipated that the mergers of existing boroughs might produce unsatisfactory boundaries in some places and a Local Government Boundary Commission for England was established by the Local Government Act 1972 to review periodically the boundaries of Greater London and the London boroughs. The first review of boundaries in London commenced on 1 April 1987 and reported in 1992. The transfer of the Redbridge part of the estate to Barking and Dagenham had broad support. Following the review, in April 1994 an area of 90 hectares with a population of 200, was transferred from Redbridge to Barking and Dagenham, and a new ward of Becontree electing two councillors was created. The wards and councillor allocations were redrawn in 2002.

=== Services ===
All houses were supplied with gas by the Gas Light and Coke Company; most had gas lighting and some were fitted with electric lighting. Electricity was supplied by the County of London Electric Supply Company in Dagenham and the electricity services of Barking and Ilford municipal corporations in those sections. All gas lighting was converted to electricity in 1955. Water supply in the whole estate came from the South Essex Waterworks Company, but sewerage was split on municipal lines. In 1930 Barking and Ilford formed the Ilford and Barking Joint Sewerage Committee.

The General Post Office placed the entire estate in the Dagenham post town, including the Barking and Ilford sections, giving all residents postal addresses of "Dagenham, Essex". It is perhaps for this reason that Becontree and Dagenham became synonymous. In 1927 the LCC was reluctant to agree that the Postmaster General should provide subscriber telephone lines to the estate, as it was considered incongruous for residents of a subsidised housing scheme to be able to afford such a luxury. Lines were connected from nearby exchanges until the DOMinion exchange was opened within the estate. In 1954 it had 1,337 lines, increasing to 1,620 in 1955 and by 1958 it had 2,700 lines.

The original LCC plan anticipated a civic and commercial centre around Parsloes Park. However, LCC was only a landlord in the area and had limited ability to influence commercial development and had no control over local government. The plan was not followed and Dagenham Civic Centre opened in 1937 outside the eastern boundary of the estate. The lack of a conventional town centre meant residents used the existing centres at Barking and Ilford. Small parades of shops were provided throughout the estate, such as on Gale Street and Wood Lane, but Dagenham Urban District Council tried to make up for the lack of a high street by creating a commercial centre along Heathway in 1934.

The estate was built without any provision for car parking as it was not anticipated that tenants would own cars. The plot sizes did not allow for garages to be added to homes. The LCC provided eleven garages for rent in 1937 and a further eighty in 1951. The LCC planned a tramway through the estate, filling some of the wide spaces on roads left by the special railway, but it was never built. There were no railway stations within the boundaries of the estate, with Chadwell Heath, Dagenham, Dagenham Dock and Goodmayes a short distance away. At first, trains on the Fenchurch Street–Southend line of the LMS passed through the estate without stopping, but in 1926 the LMS provided Gale Street Halt on the line. In 1932 (when the line was doubled with the addition of two electrified tracks) Gale Street Halt became Becontree station and a new station was added at Heathway. The stations were primarily served by the District Railway, which had been extended from Barking to Upminster.

Over the 15-year period of the building of the estate, the school-aged population rose rapidly to 25,000 while there were only 4 secondary schools nearby: 3 in Chadwell Heath and 1 at Becontree Heath, which meant that many children could not attend school. The first secondary school to be built was "Green Lane" in 1923, but it later became a primary school. It was renamed "Henry Green" in 1953, after the first headmaster after the secondary school opened in 1925.

Another improvement was after the 1952 smog, when the estate was declared a smokeless zone. The houses had their old fireplaces converted for use with smokeless fuel, which included fixed gas pokers in the hearths. The elderly man and his wife who lived in Mill Lane, Chadwell Heath and toured the estate in a horse-drawn cart on Saturday mornings selling logs and firewood (mostly tarred wood taken from the East End roads when they were replaced by tarmac) saw their business collapse overnight.

=== Economic development ===
Initially the estate had no industrial and very little commercial development planned to support the population. Residents commuted to Inner London for work, until the May & Baker and Ford Dagenham sites opened nearby.

== Demography ==
According to the 2011 census, White British was the largest ethnic group in Becontree ward at 51%. The second-largest was Black African, at 13%. Overall, 41.2% identified themselves as having a BAME background. In addition, the figures for Parsloes ward, which also covers parts of Becontree, were 61%, 14%, and 30.9% respectively. The median house price in 2014 in Becontree ward was £210,000, which along with the borough is one of the lowest in Greater London.

== Governance ==
The estate is within the Becontree, Eastbrook, Goresbrook, Heath, Mayesbrook, Parsloes, River, Valence and Village (2010) wards - 9 of the 17 in Barking and Dagenham - see Barking and Dagenham London Borough Council.

== Culture ==
East London has a long history of brass bands, and Becontree Brass Band was founded in 1981 as an amalgamation of several local bands.

The Dagenham Girl Pipers were formed in 1930 as the first female pipe band in the world and as of 2025 no longer exist.

== Education ==
The area is served by 26 primary schools, and thirteen secondary schools of which three are free schools and one, Elutec, is a University technical college.

== Transport ==
Becontree tube station is served by London Buses Routes 62 and 145. Martins Corner is also served by routes 5, 62, 145, 364, EL2, and night bus N15.

The Becontree estate itself is served by routes 62, 128, 150, 364, and 368. Chadwell Heath station to the north is served by routes 62 and 368.

The area has local bus connections towards Dagenham Heathway, Dagenham Dock, Barking, Ilford, Goodmayes, and Romford.

== Notable residents ==
- Alf Ramsey
- Terry Venables
- Max Bygraves
- Dudley Moore
- Sandie Shaw
- George Carey, the former Archbishop of Canterbury
- Danny Westwood

== See also ==
- List of large council estates in the UK
