= Grade I and II* listed buildings in the London Borough of Havering =

There are over 9,000 Grade I listed buildings and 20,000 Grade II* listed buildings in England. This page is a list of these buildings in the London Borough of Havering.

== Grade I ==
Name	Location	Type	Completed (Note: The date given is the date used by Historic England as significant for the initial building or that of an important part in the structure's description.)	Date designated	Grid ref. (Note: Sometimes known as OSGB36, the grid reference is based on the British national grid reference system used by the Ordnance Survey.) Geo-coordinates	Entry number (Note: The "List Entry Number" is a unique number assigned to each listed building and scheduled monument by Historic England.)	Image
Church of St Helen and St Giles	Rainham, Havering	Church	c. 1170	7 January 1955	TQ5208382208; 51°31′06″N 0°11′26″E	1358505	Church of St Helen and St Giles More images
Church of St Laurence	Upminster, Havering	Church	Medieval	7 January 1955	TQ5592986496; 51°33′21″N 0°14′52″E	1184679	Church of St Laurence More images
Church of St Mary Magdalene	North Ockendon, Havering	Church	12th century	7 January 1955	TQ5873984866; 51°32′25″N 0°17′15″E	1183610	Church of St Mary Magdalene More images
Parish Church of St Andrew	Hornchurch, Havering	Parish Church	13th century	7 January 1955	TQ5440986968; 51°33′38″N 0°13′34″E	1358529	Parish Church of St Andrew More images
The Bower House	Havering-atte-Bower, Havering	Country House	1729	4 July 1952	TQ5125492708; 51°36′46″N 0°10′59″E	1079873	The Bower House More images
Stable Block at the Bower House	Havering-atte-Bower, Havering	Stable	c. 1729	4 July 1952	TQ5124392695; 51°36′46″N 0°10′59″E	1079874	Stable Block at the Bower House

== Grade II* ==
Name	Location	Type	Completed	Date designated	Grid ref. Geo-coordinates	Entry number	Image
Bretons	Hornchurch, Havering	House	Late 17th century	7 January 1955	TQ5169684862; 51°32′32″N 0°11′10″E	1079875	Bretons More images
Church of St Mary and St Peter	Wennington, Havering	Church	Medieval	7 January 1955	TQ5398780949; 51°30′23″N 0°13′03″E	1079886	Church of St Mary and St Peter More images
Great Tomkyns	Upminster, Havering	House	17th century	7 January 1955	TQ5666989498; 51°34′57″N 0°15′35″E	1184797	Upload Photo
Barn to North East of Great Tomkyns	Upminster, Havering	Barn	1727	7 January 1955	TQ5668589611; 51°35′01″N 0°15′36″E	1358527	Upload Photo
High House Farmhouse	Corbets Tey, Havering	House	c. 1700	7 January 1955	TQ5622585025; 51°32′33″N 0°15′05″E	1079867	High House Farmhouse
Parish Church of St Edward the Confessor	Romford, Havering	Parish Church	1849	4 July 1952	TQ5119588957; 51°34′45″N 0°10′50″E	1358535	Parish Church of St Edward the Confessor More images
Rainham Hall	Rainham, Havering	House	1729	7 January 1955	TQ5209982164; 51°31′05″N 0°11′27″E	1358506	Rainham Hall More images
Forecourt Railings, Gates and Piers Walls and Vases at Rainham Hall	Rainham, Havering	Gate	Early 18th century	7 January 1955	TQ5208482158; 51°31′04″N 0°11′26″E	1079922	Forecourt Railings, Gates and Piers Walls and Vases at Rainham Hall More images
Stable Block at Rainham Hall	Rainham, Havering	Stable	18th century	7 January 1955	TQ5211582153; 51°31′04″N 0°11′28″E	1183554	Stable Block at Rainham Hall
The Lodge at Rainham Hall	Rainham, Havering	House	Early 18th century	7 January 1955	TQ5209482149; 51°31′04″N 0°11′26″E	1079923	The Lodge at Rainham Hall More images
The Round House	Havering-atte-Bower, Havering	Villa	1792	4 July 1952	TQ5148893136; 51°37′00″N 0°11′12″E	1183562	The Round House
The Royal Liberty School	Gidea Park, Havering	Country House	1768-9	14 September 1979	TQ5321289728; 51°35′08″N 0°12′36″E	1079885	The Royal Liberty School More images
Upminster Hall	Upminster, Havering	House	17th century	7 January 1955	TQ5659287682; 51°33′59″N 0°15′28″E	1079889	Upminster Hall
Upminster Windmill	Upminster, Havering	Smock Mill	Mid 19th century	7 January 1955	TQ5573486725; 51°33′28″N 0°14′42″E	1079878	Upminster Windmill More images
Wrought Iron Screen and Gates with Piers at Bretons	Hornchurch, Havering	Gate	c. 1740	7 January 1955	TQ5173984853; 51°32′32″N 0°11′12″E	1358521	Wrought Iron Screen and Gates with Piers at Bretons
