= Thames Chase =

Forest in London and Essex

Coordinates: 51.5520°N 0.2820°E

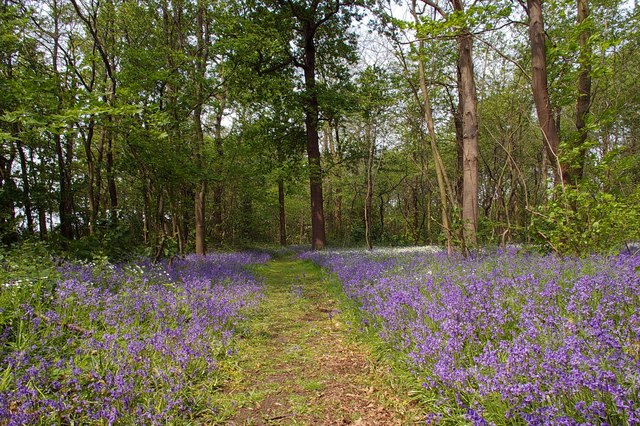
A path through White Post Wood, part of Belhus Country Park and Thames Chase

The Thames Chase Community Forest is a community forest of 9842 hectares (24,320 acres/38 square miles) located in 47 sites in London and Essex, England. Established in 1990, the community forest is administered by the Thames Chase Trust, with a stated aim "to renew and regenerate the landscape at the edge of East London and South Essex by creating a varied wooded landscape for local people to influence, create, use, enjoy and cherish".

The Thames Chase Forest Centre is located near Upminster. Forestry England manage the 56 hectares (140 acres) of new woodlands, meadows and ponds at the site for the benefit of people, nature and the climate.

== List of sites within the Thames Chase Community Forest ==
- London Borough of Havering
  - Berwick Glades
  - Berwick Woods
  - Bonnetts Wood
  - Hornchurch Country Park
  - Pages Wood
  - Ingrebourne Valley
  - Parklands
- London Borough of Barking and Dagenham
  - Central Park
  - Eastbrookend Country Park
  - The Chase Nature Reserve
  - Bretons Outdoor Centre
  - Beam Valley Country Park
- Essex
  - in the Brentwood area:
    - Shenfield Common
    - Thorndon Country Park
    - three sites near Warley
  - the Mardyke Valley running from near Brentwood to the River Thames at Purfleet (four sites)
  - in the Aveley area, six sites, including Belhus Country Park and Kennington Park

== Thames Chase Strategic Partnership Board ==
The Thames Chase Strategic Partnership Board oversees development of the community forest. It comprises members each from:

- Forestry England
- Barking and Dagenham London Borough Council
- Brentwood Borough Council
- Essex County Council
- Havering London Borough Council
- Thurrock Council
