= Rainham Hall =

Historic house museum in London, England

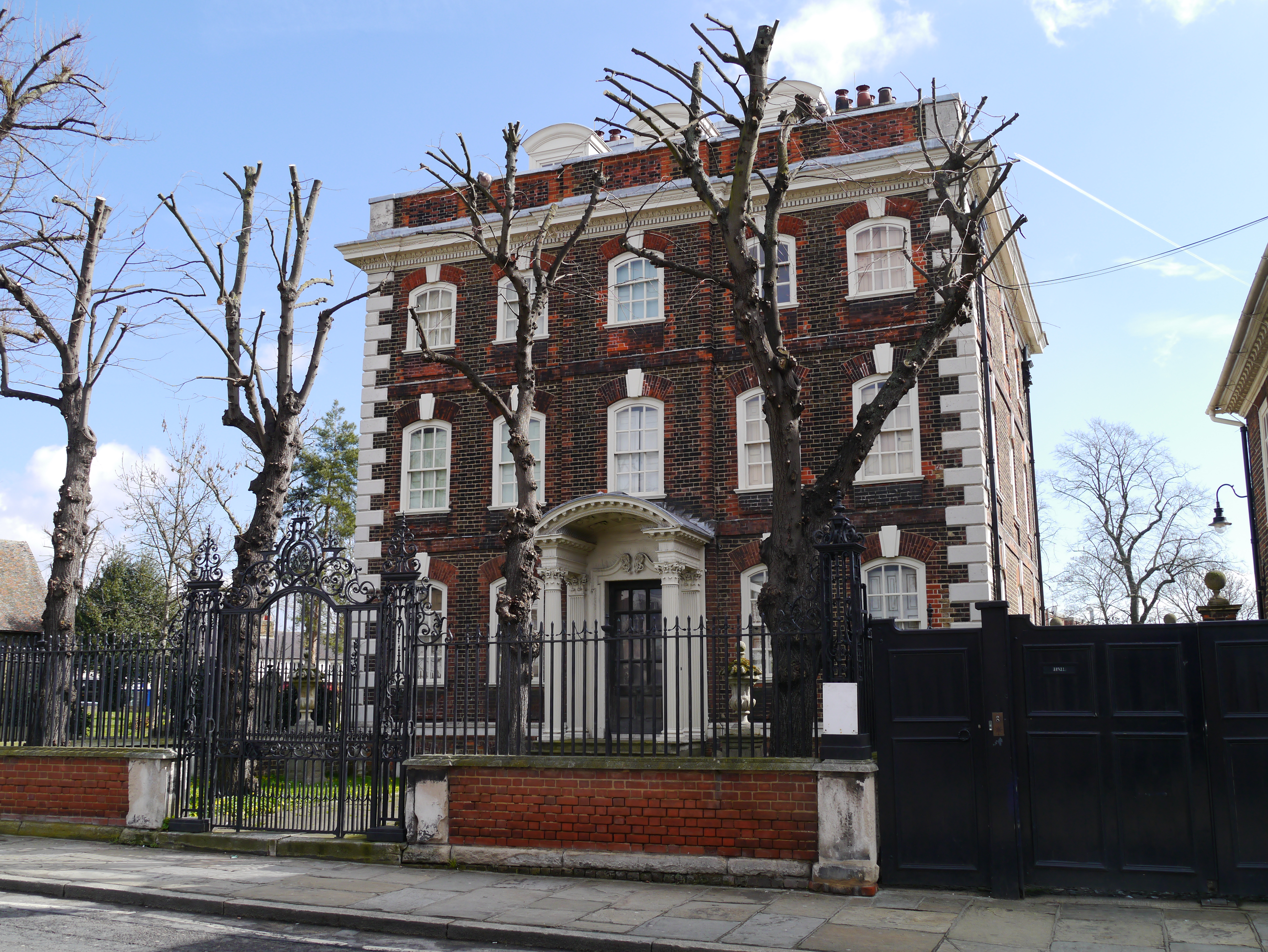
- Rainham Hall, front view

- Location within Greater London

General information
- Architectural style: Georgian
- Location: Rainham, England
- Coordinates: 51°31′4.44″N 00°11′26.52″E
- Owner: National Trust

Website
- www.nationaltrust.org.uk/rainham-hall

Listed Building – Grade II*
- Designated: 7 Jan 1955
- Reference no.: 1358506

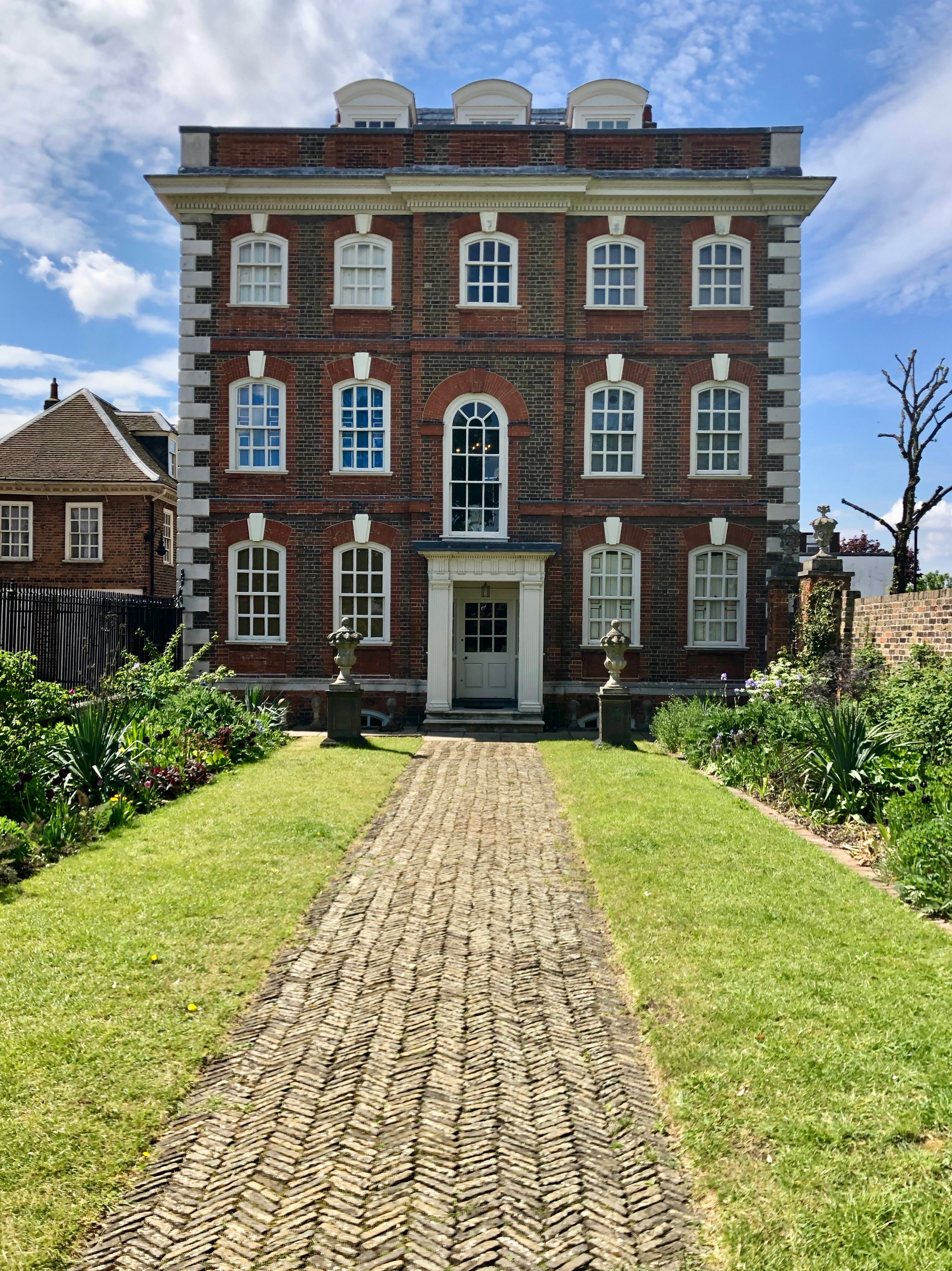
Rainham Hall, back view

Rainham Hall is a Grade II* listed Georgian house, owned by the National Trust, in Rainham, in the London Borough of Havering. Built in 1729 for Captain John Harle, the house was transferred to the National Trust in 1949. Let to a succession of private tenants, it remained closed to the public until late 2015. It recently appeared as a location in the 2019 BBC production of A Christmas Carol.

== Buildings ==
Rainham Hall is a three-storey brown and red brick house next to the church of St Helen and St Giles in the centre of Rainham in the London Borough of Havering. It is an example of a Dutch domestic Queen Anne style house. Many of the original features of the house remain, including trompe-l'œil frescoes on the walls and Delft tiles in the fireplaces. Outside the front of the house are Grade II* listed wrought-iron railings that feature the intertwining initials of Harle and his wife Mary. They are described as being amongst the finest in London from that time; a guide published by the London Borough of Havering suggests that they might have been created by Jean Tijou, a famed blacksmith who produced the ironwork for Hampton Court Palace.

Along with the main building the grounds contain a stable/coach house and lodge, all of which were given Grade II* listed status in January 1955. Some of the walls in the garden and "stone garden vases of contemporary date" were also listed at the same time. The two-acre garden features a recently replanted 30-tree orchard, one of the largest in London. Harle used the coach house and hall as the main centre for his trading activities. The close proximity of the commercial and domestic buildings is described by the National Trust as "significant because it seems to be a rare survival of a practice which was once widespread".

Rainham Hall has been recommended for an upgrade to Grade I listed status. A 2011 Heritage Scoping Study noted that the main building should be reviewed, stating that "it is one of the finest and best-preserved examples in England of a medium-sized early Georgian merchant’s house" with the National Trust receiving credit for their work on maintaining the property. It goes on to state that the "outstanding level of the significance of this landmark" should merit a review in the listed status.

== History ==
=== The Harle family ===
John Harle, born in 1688, was a sea-captain and merchant from South Shields. In 1718 he married Mary Tibbington, a widow from Stepney, while living in the vicinity of Wapping. Ten years later, after transferring the responsibility for the sailing ventures to a cousin, he purchased the Rainham property, including the wharf. He invested money dredging the River Ingrebourne, thereby giving trading vessels a route up to Rainham from the Thames. He had Rainham Hall constructed in 1729 using high-quality materials as a showcase for the building products he sold. Harle is credited with being significant in the development of Rainham Village throughout the 18th century. Mary died in 1739, and John, without heir, soon married a Rainham widow named Sarah Gregory. He died in 1742, leaving the house to Sarah and his two-year-old son John. Sarah died in 1749, leaving her son John to the care of her sister Jane, who had been living at Rainham Hall. At Jane's death two years later, John moved to London to stay with an uncle, and the contents of the house went to auction. (Note: A copy of John Harle's will was discovered at a car boot sale in 2014 and was donated to Rainham Hall.)

The estate was managed by a trustee William Dearsley during John Harle junior's childhood. In 1763, John married Dearsley's daughter Sarah, and turned to Methodism, inviting noted preacher John Valton of Purfleet to speak at Rainham Hall in 1767. After John junior's death in 1770, Sarah married Jarvis Chambers and moved to Hackney. The property ultimately passed to a distant relative of Jarvis Chambers, but none of the Chambers ever resided in Rainham. Two brothers who had lived at Rainham as tenants, Edward and Octavius Daldy, purchased the property in 1887, and in the meantime sub-let the hall while running the wharf business.

=== Sale and renovation ===
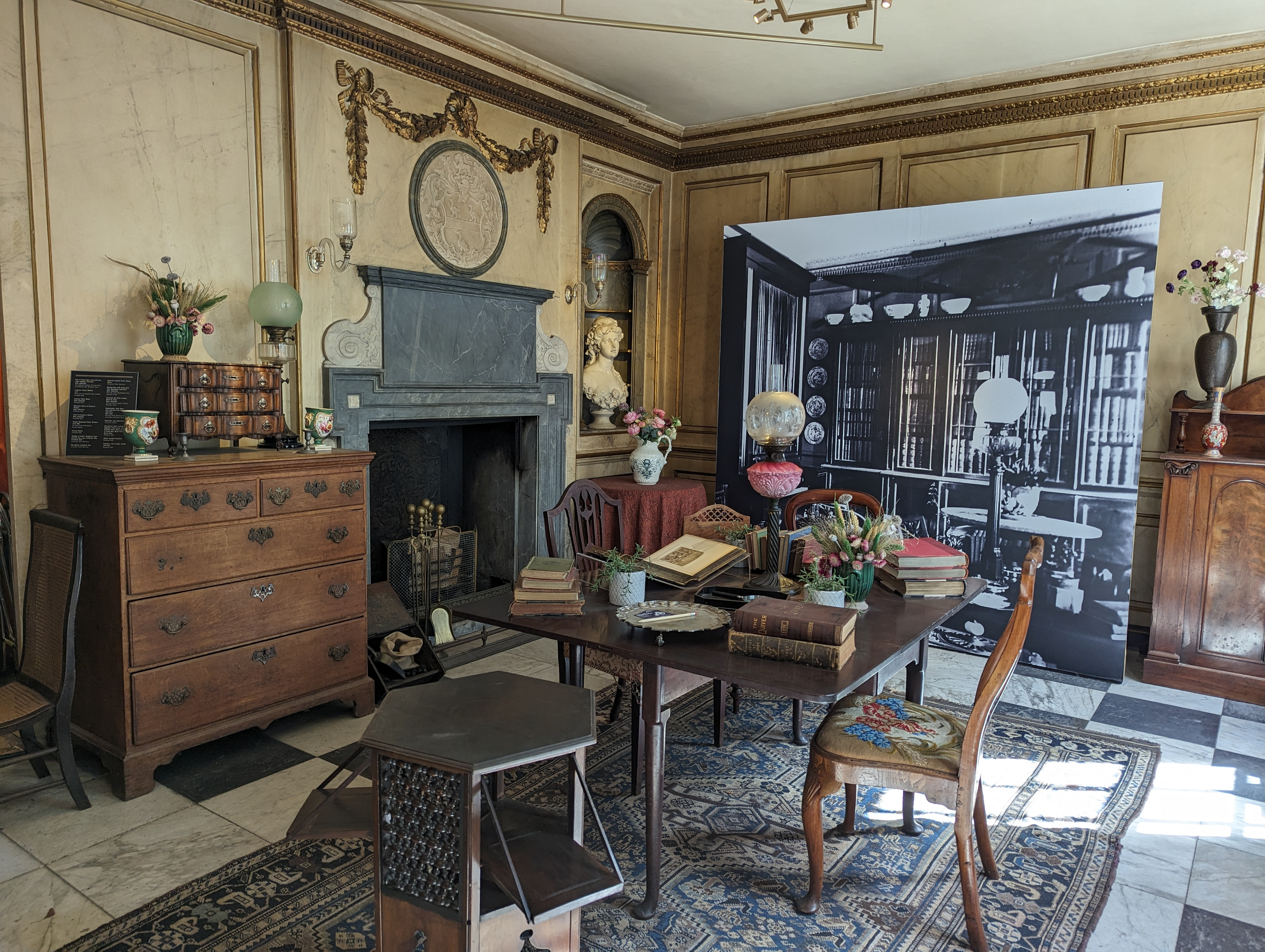
The entrance hall

In 1874 the Reverend Nicholas Brady moved into Rainham Hall as the Daldys' tenant. Brady was a naturalist as well as being the rector of nearby Wenington Church, which he restored in the 1880s. Brady purchased Rainham Hall in 1900, and on his death eleven years later, left it to his wife. Upon her death, it passed to their nieces and nephews.

It was purchased in 1917 by Colonel Herbert Hall Mulliner as a setting for part of his outstanding collections of English furniture and English pottery. (Note: The collection was sold at Christie's, 10 July 1924 and following days Catalogue of the Important Collection of Old English Furniture, Objects of Art and Tapestry, formed by the late Col. H.H. Mulliner..., removed from Clifton Court, Rugby and Albany, Piccadilly; the collection was catalogued by Margaret Jourdain, writing as "Francis Lenygon", The Late Stuart and Early Georgian Periods. The Decorative Arts in England 1660-1780 (1924); numerous pieces of furniture from the Mulliner collection were illustrated in Percy Macquoid and Ralph Edwards, eds. The Dictionary of English furniture (1927).) He was involved in architectural salvage and added several 18C features to Rainham Hall including, possibly, the fireplaces. He also added the Harle coat of arms over the entrance hall fireplace, copying it from the Harle grave. Despite all these efforts, Mulliner never actually resided at Rainham, and died in London in 1924. The house was then purchased by his solicitor, William Murray Sturges. Sturges extended the living space upwards, creating attic rooms in order to accommodate his family of 6 children. Upon his death in 1945, the house was offered to the National Trust in lieu of death duties, but the settlement was not finalised until 1949.

=== The nursery and private tenants ===
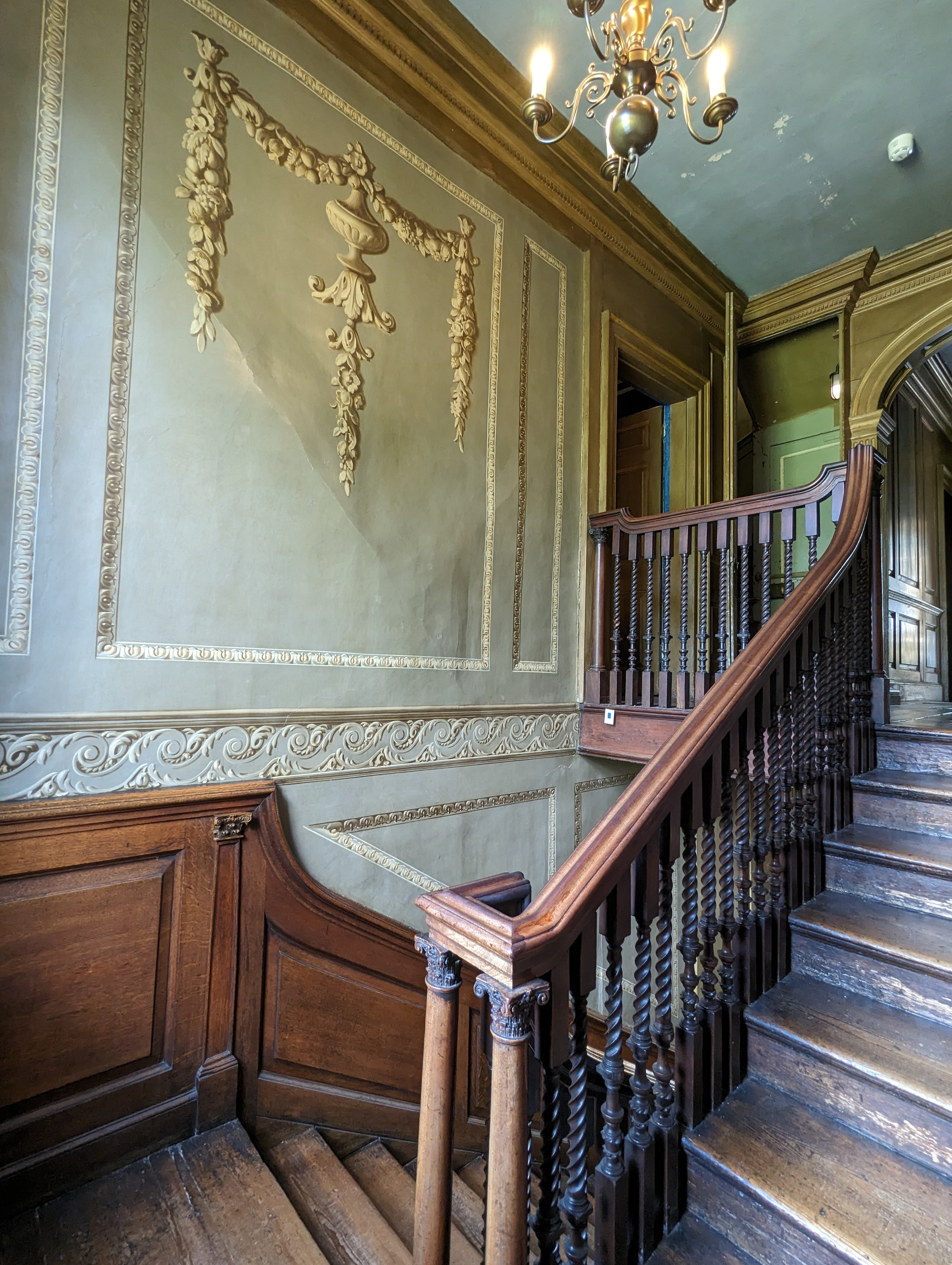
The staircase

During the Second World War, Rainham Hall was requisitioned for use as a nursery by Essex County Council. It continued to serve that purpose until 1954, allowing mothers to work outside the home. Despite being used as a nursery, the house was advertised as a country house open for tourist visits "upon application to the matron" in the early 1950s. Once the Essex County Council lease had expired, the house was leased by the National Trust to Walter Ison, an architectural historian and his wife Leonora Payne, an artist specialising in architectural illustration. They used it as their private residence until 1962, but did provide public tours on a limited weekly basis.

The next tenant at Rainham was photographer Anthony Denney. Despite his professional interest in modern design, he amassed a collection of 18C furniture. He also invested in renovation, such as the paintwork and panelling. Following Denney's departure in 1969, the hall was leased to a succession of musicians and artists, such as Paul Silverthorne and David Atack.

=== The National Trust ===
The National Trust took the decision in 2010 to end its tenancy arrangements and redevelop the house as an amenity for Rainham village, as part of the Trust's strategy to increase investment in the "non-aristocratic built environment." The stable block was converted to create a café, bookshop, and exhibition area. The house was upgraded for modern safety standards, as well as restoration of various elements of the historic décor to reflect the complex history. In 2013, a team of archaeologists conducted a dig in the gardens, turning up ceramic, glass and brass artefacts, as well as discovering an unusual planting border constructed of animal bones.

The house opened for visitors in October 2015, showcasing the decorative elements applied by tenants throughout the years and items found under the floorboards as a means of illustrating its history. In 2019, an exhibition on the career of Anthony Denney was held in the house, showcasing his work in both interior design as well as photography. The house now contains a series of four exhibitions reflecting on its owners and history, including Nicholas Brady, the day nursery, Anthony Denney and John Harle.

== In popular culture ==
In 2019, Rainham Hall was used as a filming location for the BBC adaptation of A Christmas Carol, with both the interior and exterior used to create the home of Ebeneezer Scrooge. In 2026 it was used as a location for a new production of Jane Austen's Sense and Sensibility.

== See also ==
- Grade I and II* listed buildings in the London Borough of Havering

== Sources ==
- Cary, Roger (1950). "Country Houses Open to the Public". The Burlington Magazine. 92 (568): 209–213. ISSN 0007-6287. JSTOR 870447.
- Collett, Jenny (2015). Rainham Hall. National Trust. ISBN 9781843594758. OCLC 973816257.
- Kennedy, Maev (8 October 2015). "Rainham Hall: the gorgeous house in Essex that's revolutionised the National Trust". The Guardian (Online). ProQuest 2830359318.
- Montgomery, Angus (May 2015). "Studio Weave and CSM students breathe life into Rainham Hall". Design Week (Online Edition): 2. ISSN 0950-3676.
- Readman, Paul (2016). "Octavia Hill and the English landscape". Octavia Hill, Social Activism and the Remaking of British Society. University of London Press. pp. 163–184. ISBN 978-1-909646-00-1. JSTOR j.ctv4w3whm.15.
- RR (30 August 2013). "An archaeological dig at Rainham Hall has revealed clues about the building's history". Romford Recorder. ProQuest 1428725245.
- RR (20 December 2019). "Exhibition shows the transformation of listed hall for BBC Dickens' adaptation". Romford Recorder. ProQuest 2328537234.
- Woodward, Christopher (16 December 1996). "Obituary : Leonora Ison". The Independent.
- Wustemann, Louis (5 July 2019). "Anthony Denney: the Dior of interior decorating". FT.com. The Financial Times Limited. ProQuest 2252571024.
