= Church of St Laurence, Upminster =

Church in East London, England

Coordinates: 51.555°N 0.248°E

St Laurence, Upminster
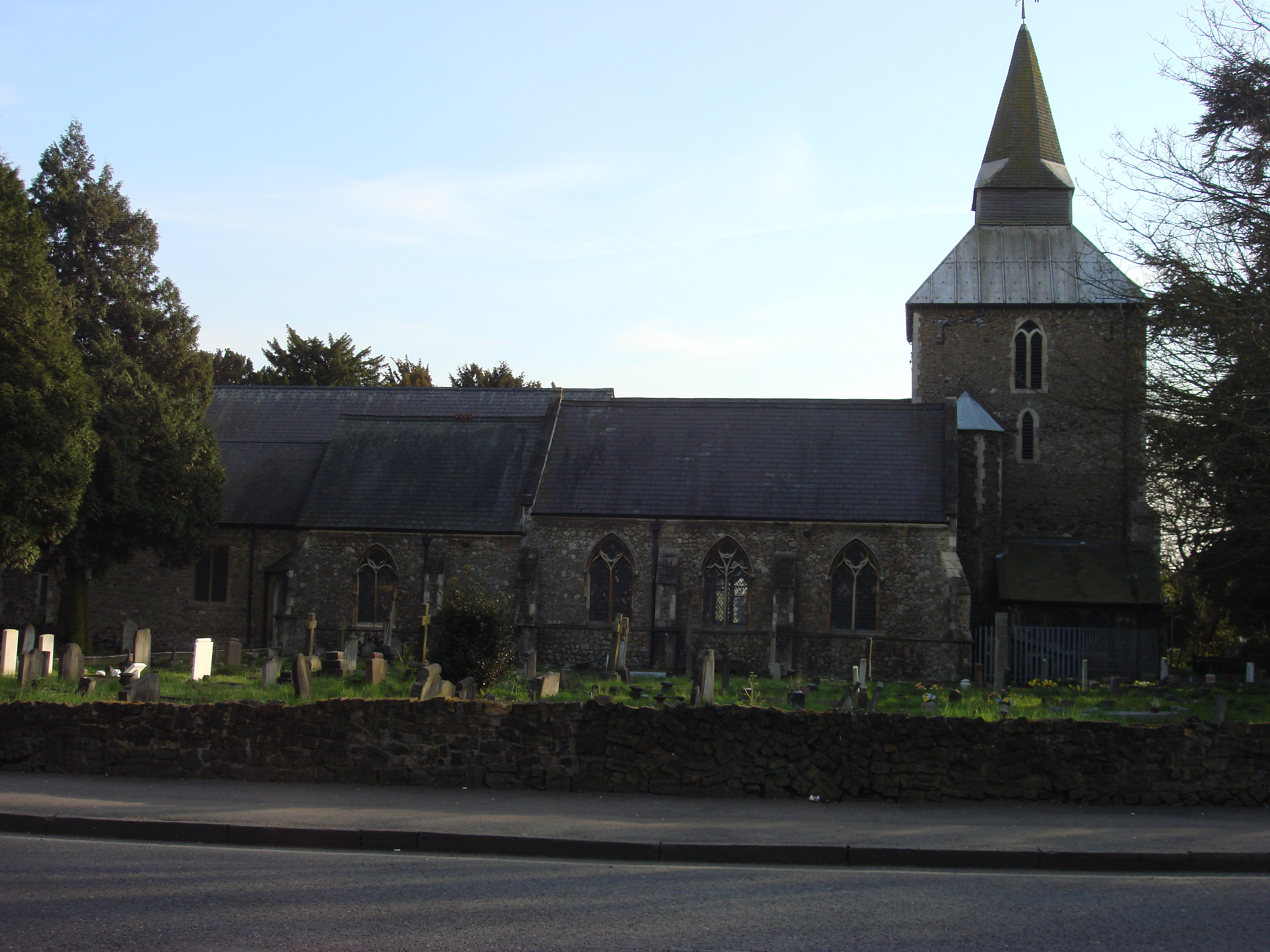
- St Laurence, Upminster
- Denomination: Church of England
- Churchmanship: Anglo-Catholicism
- Website: Church website

Administration
- Province: Province of Canterbury
- Diocese: Diocese of Chelmsford
- Archdeaconry: Archdeaconry of West Ham
- Deanery: Havering

The church of St Laurence, Upminster, is the Church of England parish church in Upminster, England. It is a Grade I listed building. It is the historic minster or church from which Upminster derives its name, meaning 'upper church', probably signifying 'church on higher ground'. The place-name is first attested as 'Upmynster' in 1062, and appears as 'Upmunstra' in the Domesday Book of 1086.

== History ==
Alice Perrers, mistress of King Edward III, was buried in the church or churchyard in 1400. However, there is no memorial to mark her grave. She had three illegitimate children with the king and later lived and died in the Gaynes manor in Upminster.

The tower of St Laurence's played a crucial role in Rev. William Derham's first accurate measurement of the speed of sound. Derham was also buried in the church or churchyard, and in accordance with his wishes, there is no memorial for him.

== Description ==
The church exemplifies 13th-century construction. The tower, dating from this period, features rubble walls, buttresses at its base, and a leaded, shingled spire characteristic of Essex architecture.

The church underwent significant rebuilding in 1862–1863 by W. Gibbs Bartleet. Further rebuilding took place in 1928, when the original chancel became part of the nave, and the new choir and sanctuary were built, by Sir Charles Nicholson. Nicholson also built the current south chapel and Lady Chapel, on the north side.

The pulpit is by Violet Pinwill of Devon. The baptismal font is 15th-century, and came from Upminster Hill Chapel. The monuments include those of the Branfills of Upminster Hall, and the Esdailes of Gaynes.

The churchyard contains war graves of six service personnel of World War II.
