= Launders Lane fires =

Fire hotspot in Rainham, London, England

Coordinates: 51.513°N 0.220°E

The Arnolds Field rubbish dump in Launders Lane in Rainham, London, England, has experienced a large number of fires since around 2013, exposing local residents to toxic fumes. It has been nicknamed the "Rainham Volcano".

== Background ==
The London Fire Brigade have said that the site periodically reignites due to the buildup of rubbish, which had been dumped "in excess of five metres" above council-approved levels. In 2023, a thermal imaging drone identified a patch of ground that was 176.4 °C. Since 2018, the fire brigade has had to deal with nearly 200 fires on the compound. Following a May 2020 gas canister explosion that nearly hit a firefighter's head, the brigade has resorted to spraying the fires from the roadside rather than setting foot on the property.

Efforts have been made by Havering Council to deal with the problem, with the assistance of the Environment Agency. Attempts to remedy the problem have been complicated by multiple issues, including decades of illegal dumping of unknown materials and previous use of the site as a cannabis farm and weapons store. A local group of volunteers, Rainham Against Pollution, have gone as far as petitioning the European Court of Human Rights for help in pressuring the council to clean up the land, though this has been hampered by the fact that the site is privately owned. Local MP Margaret Mullane, who was elected in 2024, has vowed to deal with the fires.

== History ==
Arnolds Field, which spans 17 hectares (42 acres), was a gravel pit in the 1960s. Later, it was briefly used for grazing cows and eventually abandoned. In 1998, the property was purchased by a private company called North London Developments (NLD) and converted into a dump, with the intention of eventually levelling it off and turning it into farmland.

Large-scale dumping began on the site following the purchase, with lorries coming and going day and night. As resident concerns about hazardous waste and waterway pollution mounted, they increasingly complained to their local councillors. In 2004, Havering Council issued a notice to NLD, requiring it to stop importing further materials and to remove illegal waste. In 2005, an agent from the Planning Inspectorate upheld the notice and issued the company a 12-month deadline to comply. Just before the deadline expired, however, NLD was dissolved by its owner, John Reilly, who transferred ownership of the land to himself. Dumping at Arnolds Field continued.

In February 2011, the Metropolitan Police of London conducted a search of the property and hit upon an illegal dump that included car batteries, home appliances, and piles of rubble in one corner of the lot. In another corner, they discovered a cannabis factory, housed in shipping containers and interconnected by underground passages. Ten people were arrested onsite, including Reilly, who was later sentenced to 12 years in prison.

A 2012 Environment Agency soil contamination assessment on the site found a variety of landfill waste as well as elevated levels of lead, benzo(a)pyrene, arsenic, and asbestos. Even after Reilly's conviction and the termination of his illegal operation, fly-tipping at the site continued, and in 2014, three men were caught and convicted for dumping.

In 2017, Reilly, acting through his lawyer, put Arnolds Field up for auction, and it was purchased by Jerry O'Donovan, a business owner from nearby Upminster who planned to use part of the property for vehicle and machinery storage and convert the rest to public woodland after removing all the waste that had been buried there.

In 2023, Imperial College's Environmental Research Group collected data on pollution caused by the fires. In 2025, the area was officially declared contaminated, following a High Court review.

== Incidents and issues ==
Various incidents and issues related to Arnolds Field have been reported over the years, with people experiencing respiratory problems, nausea, chest pains, bleeding noses, and headaches due to the frequent fires and toxic smoke. In 2011, an 11-year-old boy who fell over the perimeter fence while cycling in the area suffered third-degree burns.
