= Upminster Tithe Barn =

Historic building in Upminster, London

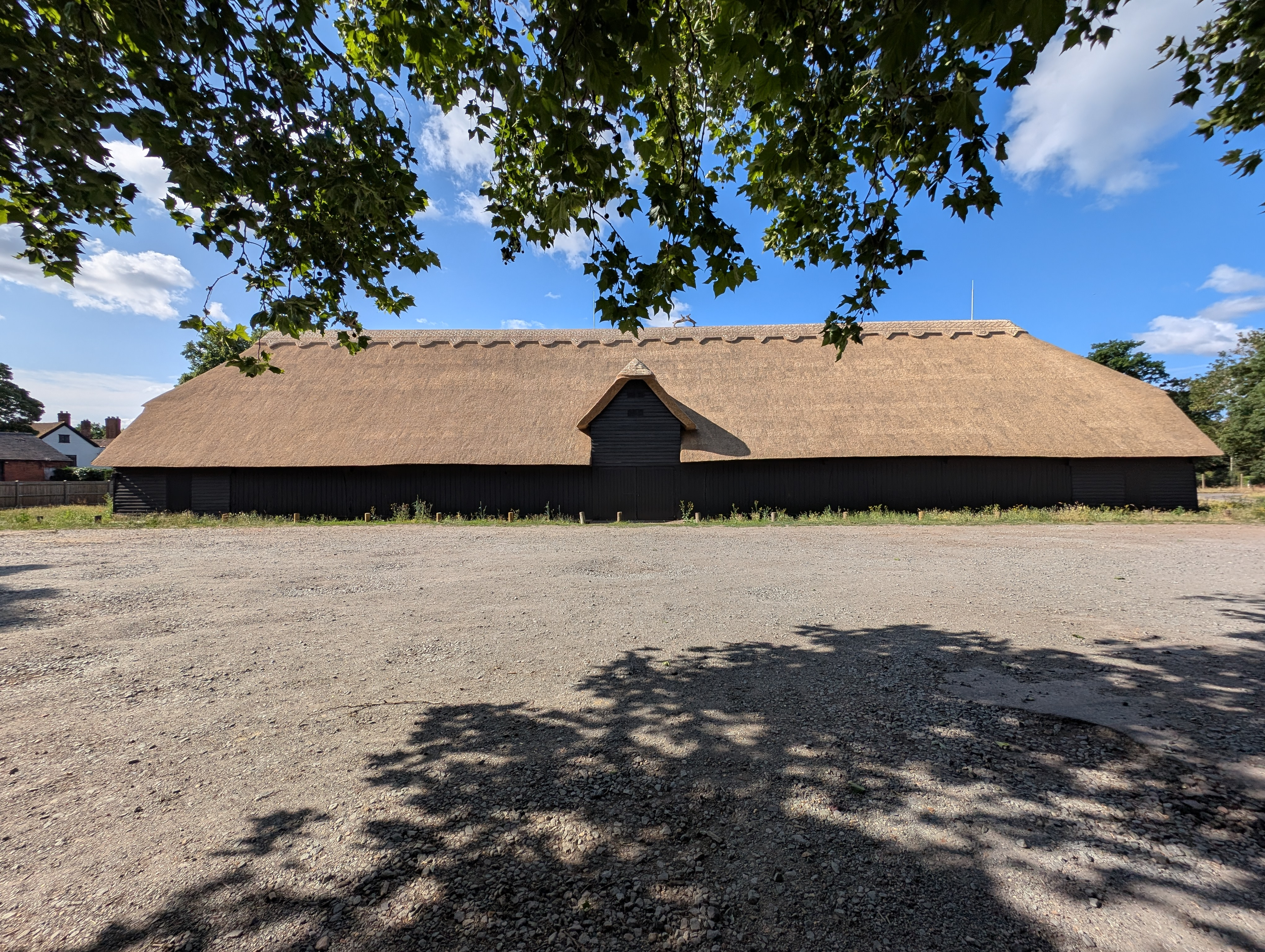
- Building after 2025 renovation

General information
- Location: Upminster
- Town or city: Havering, London
- Country: England
- Coordinates: 51.5668°N 0.2569°E
- Estimated completion: 1450; 575 years ago
- Renovated: 1965, 1976, 2025
- Closed: 2024
- Owner: Havering London Borough Council

Technical details
- Floor count: 1

Scheduled monument
- Official name: Medieval grange barn, 228m south-east of Upminster Court
- Designated: 5 November 1971
- Reference no.: 1001991

The Upminster Tithe Barn is a historic building and scheduled monument located in Upminster in the London Borough of Havering, London, England. It is a medieval agricultural building originating from around 1450. It was used as a grange barn until the dissolution of the Monasteries in 1540. Passing into private ownership, agricultural use continued up until the suburbanisation of the area in the 20th century. It has been in local authority ownership since 1937. It was used to house a small museum from 1976 to 2024. As of June 2025, the building is vacant and under renovation.

== History ==
=== Agricultural use ===
It was believed that the medieval barn was built around 1450 and this has been confirmed by dendrochronology of the timbers. It belonged to Hall Farm that was part of the manor of Upminster Hall. It was owned by Waltham Abbey until the dissolution of the Monasteries in 1540 and then passed through secular owners. There is no evidence it was ever used as a tithe barn and grange barn would be a more accurate description. (Note: A grange barn belongs to an outlying farm of a religious order.)

The barn and around 30 acres around it were sold to Hornchurch Urban District Council in 1937. In 1965 the roof was rethatched and ownership passed to Havering London Borough Council. It was listed as a scheduled monument in November 1971.

=== 1975–6 renovation ===
A fire in 1973 damaged part of the roof. Rethatching repairs were undertaken by February 1975. The building was then repaired and converted from agricultural to museum use in renovations completed in February 1976.

=== Museum ===
The agricultural museum occupied the barn from 1 May 1976. It was run in a partnership between Havering Council and the Hornchurch and District Historical Society. It opened twelve days a year from 1976. The museum closed in January 2024. As of June 2025, it is not clear if the museum will return to the building.

=== 2025 renovation ===
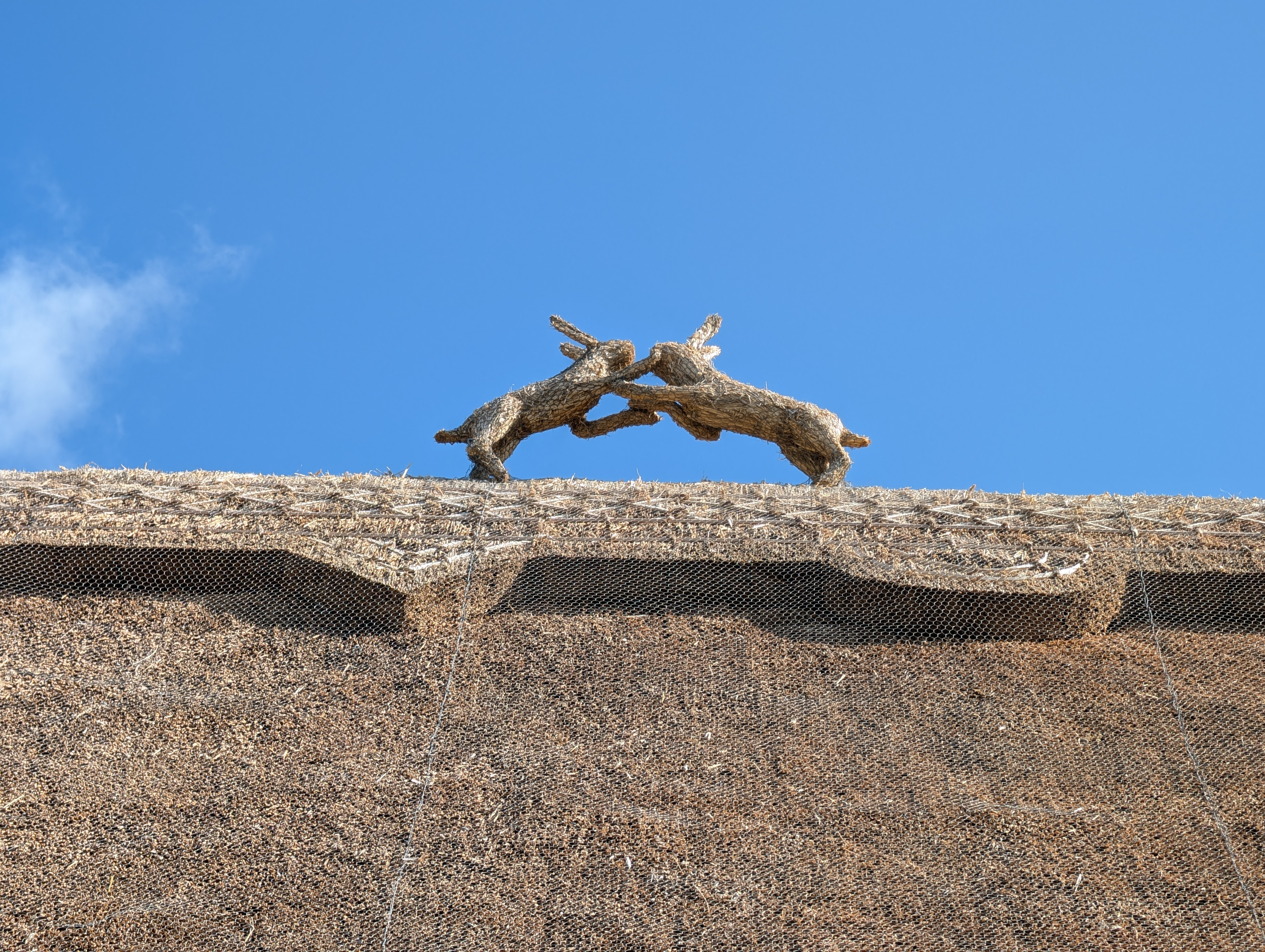
Boxing hares detail on rethatched roof

The building was added to the Heritage at Risk Register by Historic England in 2023, with the thatched roof requiring urgent work.

In January 2024 Havering Council received a grant of £650,000 from National Highways for repairs. Historic England provided a grant of £97,664.

The restoration work was completed in June 2025. Further funding was required for toilets and heating in order for the building to open to the public, a condition of the 2024 grant.

== Visitor access ==
As of June 2025, the building is not open to the public. Upminster station is the nearest National Rail, London Underground and London Overground station. The building is served by London Buses route 248 and London Buses route 346.
