= Robert Strang =

Robert Strang may refer to:

- Robert Strang (cricketer) (1901–1976), English cricketer
- Robert Strang (physician) (born 1959), Canadian physician and the chief medical officer for Nova Scotia
- Robert H. W. Strang (1881–1982), American orthodontist

== See also ==
- Robert Strange (disambiguation)
