= Roomes Stores =

Coordinates: 51.5580°N 0.2495°E

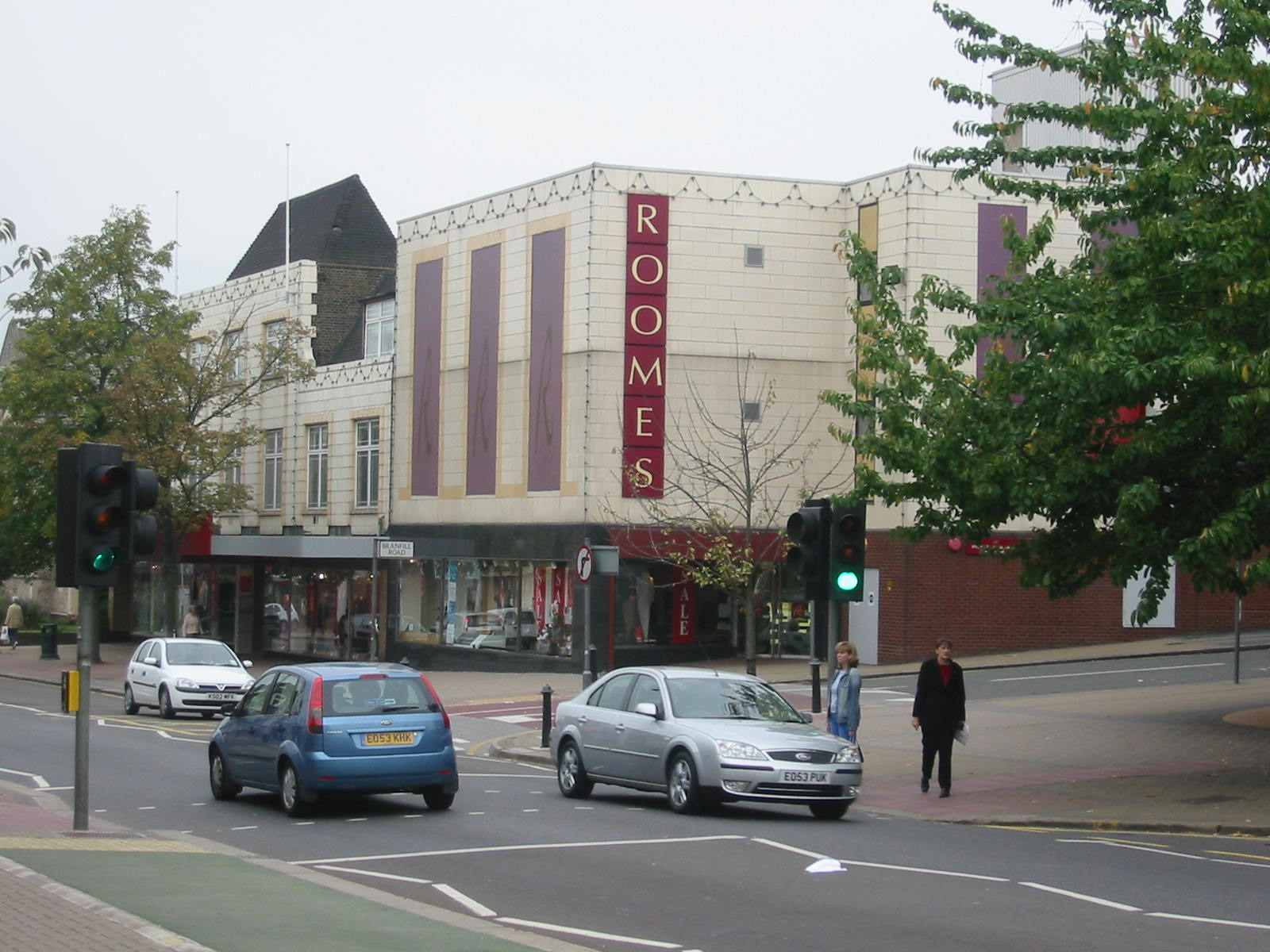
Roomes Fashion and Home

Roomes Stores is a group of two furniture and interior retail businesses in Upminster, England, under a shared brand, with separate ownership. Roomes Furniture and Interiors is an independent family-run furniture store which has occupied several sites in east London and is currently operating on Station Road, Upminster. It is one of largest furniture supply outlets in Western Europe. Roomes Fashion and Home is a department store in Upminster, separately operated as part of the Morleys Stores group. Prior to 2009 both stores were in common ownership.

== History ==
The first general store was opened in 1888 on Green Street, Upton Park and was closed in 1935. In 1927, a store was opened on the west side of Station Road, Upminster and in 1953, another store was opened just north of the Station Road location, on the opposite side of Branfill Road. These formed the fashion and homewares stores. A furniture store was opened on the east side of Station Road in 2001, originally known as "Roomes apart". The homewares store was demolished in 2007 and became a Marks & Spencer Simply Food outlet. The remaining stores were refitted and extended in order to accommodate the displaced departments. In 2009, the non-furniture part of the business, by then contained within one building, was sold to Morleys Stores and continued to trade under the Roomes brand as Roomes Fashion and Home.
