= Robert Strang (cricketer) =

English cricketer

Personal information
- Full name: Robert Strang
- Born: 30 September 1901; Hacton, Essex, England
- Died: 15 March 1976 (aged 74); Tylers Green, Buckinghamshire, England
- Batting: Right-handed
- Bowling: Right-arm medium

International information
- National side: Scotland

Domestic team information
- Years: Team
- 1924–1926: Berkshire

Career statistics
Competition	First-class
Matches	1
Runs scored	34
Batting average	17.00
100s/50s	–/–
Top score	23
Balls bowled	132
Wickets	2
Bowling average	33.00
5 wickets in innings	–
10 wickets in match	–
Best bowling	2/47
Catches/stumpings	–/–
- Source: Cricinfo, 8 December 2011

Robert Strang (30 September 1901 – 15 March 1976) was an English cricketer, a right-handed batsman who bowled right-arm medium pace.

== Life ==
He was born at Rainham Ledge, Hacton, Essex and educated at Whitgift School.

Strang made his debut for Berkshire in the 1924 Minor Counties Championship against Cornwall, with him making three appearances that season. The following season, while studying at the University of Edinburgh, Strang made a single first-class appearance for Scotland against Ireland at College Park, Dublin. In Scotland's first-innings he scored 23 runs before being dismissed by Leslie Kidd, while in their second-innings he was dismissed for 11 by Jacko Heaslip. With the ball, he took the wickets of Derrick Hall and Arthur Douglas for the cost of 47 runs from 18 overs. He also appeared for Berkshire in 1925, making eight appearances, before making a single appearance in 1926 against Wiltshire.

Outside of cricket, Strang was a doctor. He died at Tylers Green, Buckinghamshire on 15 March 1976.
