= Hacton =

Coordinates: 51.544018°N 0.231187°E

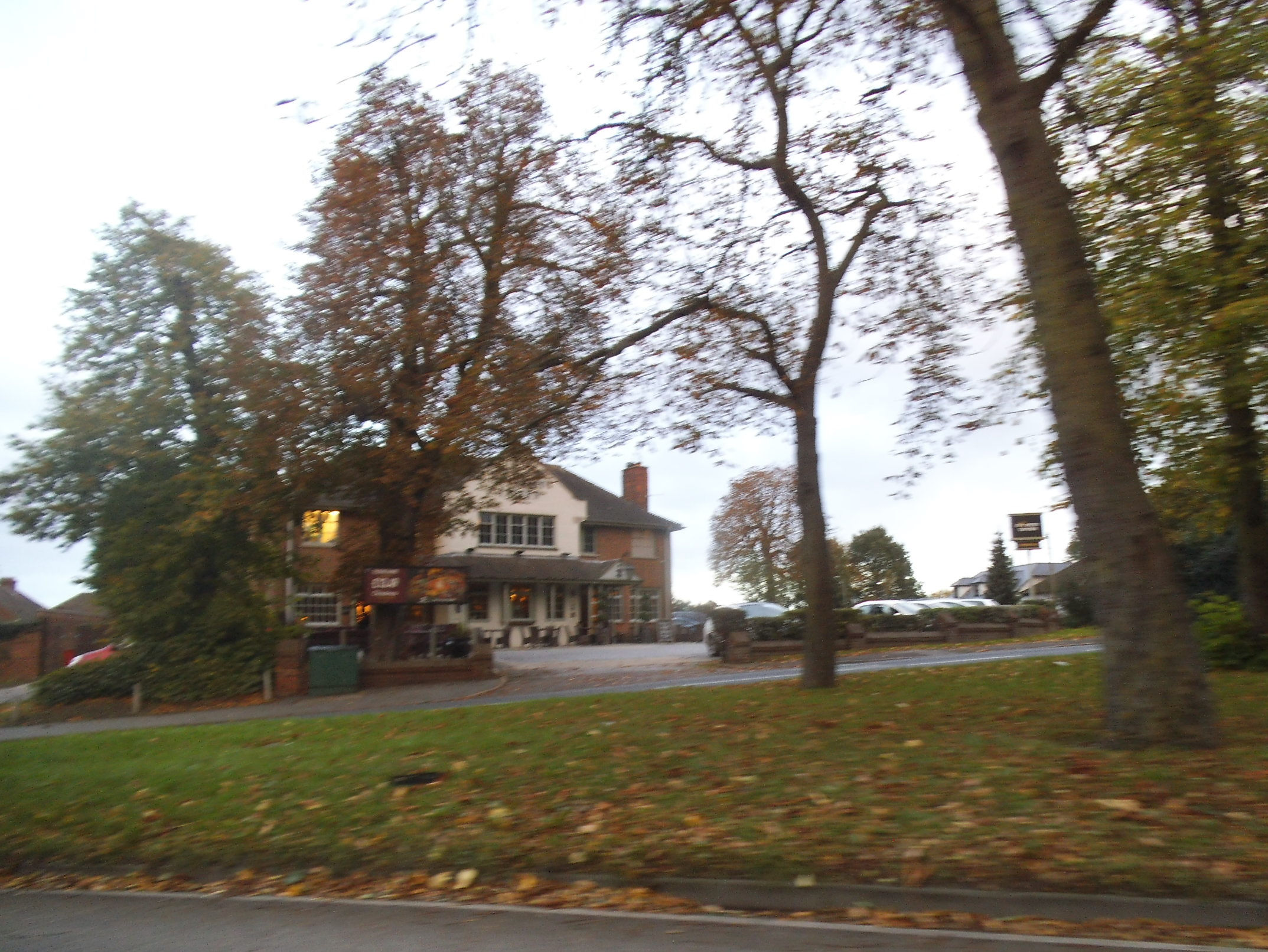
- A pub in Hacton

- Location within Greater London
- London borough: Havering
- Ceremonial county: Greater London
- Region: London
- Country: England
- Sovereign state: United Kingdom
- Post town: UPMINSTER
- Postcode district: RM14
- Dialling code: 01708
- Police: Metropolitan
- Fire: London
- Ambulance: London
- UK Parliament: Hornchurch and Upminster
- London Assembly: Havering and Redbridge

Hacton is a small dispersed settlement in Greater London, England, located within the London Borough of Havering and in East London, and beyond London urban sprawl. Surrounded by the Metropolitan Green Belt, located in the countryside between two London suburban towns (Upminster and Rainham).

== History ==
It was historically a hamlet in the ancient parish of Upminster and is within the Upminster post town. The name means 'farmstead on a hook-shaped piece of land', referring to an area adjacent to the River Ingrebourne.
