= Rainham, London =

Suburb of East London, England

Coordinates: 51.5177°N 0.1948°E

Rainham
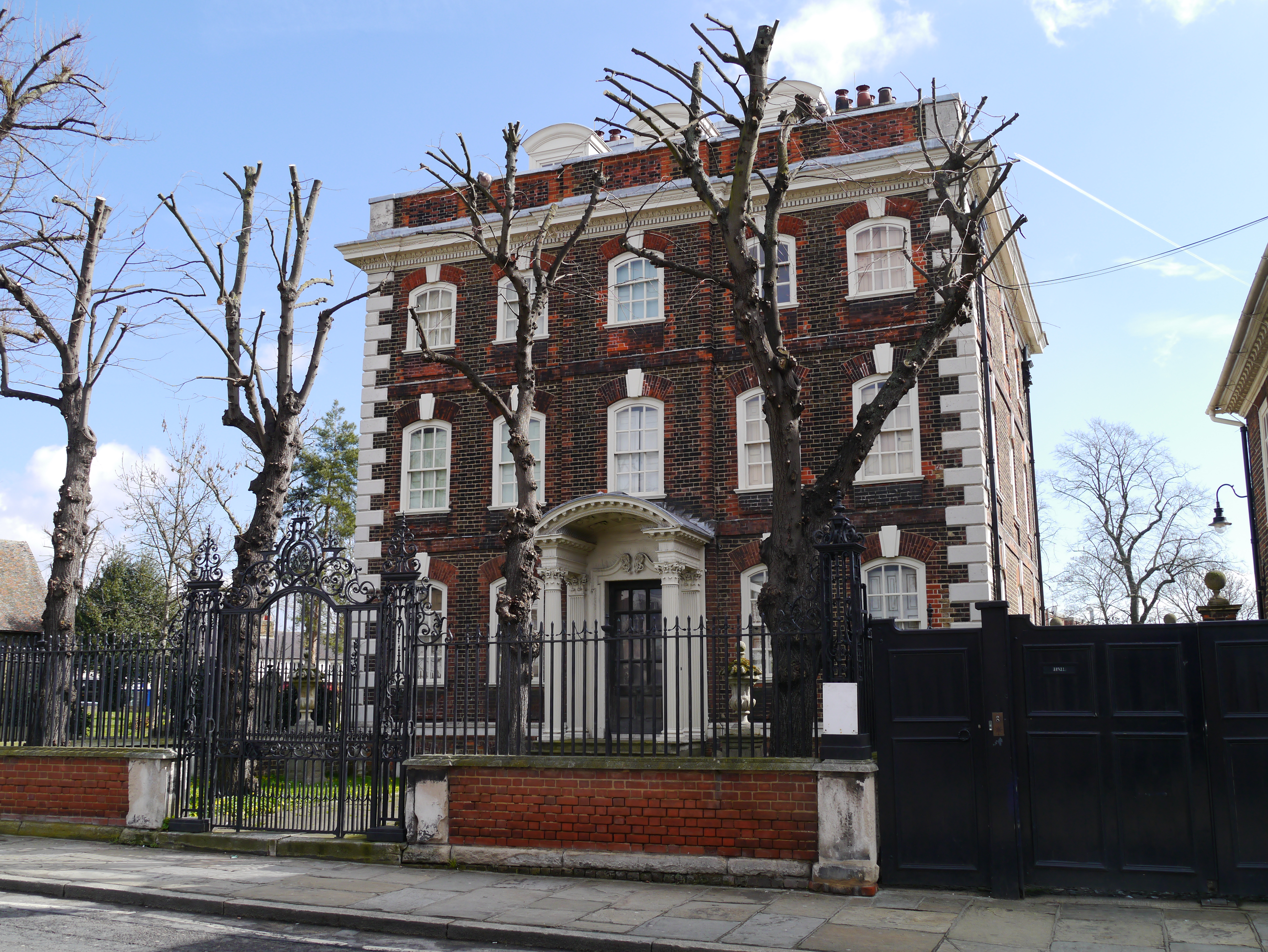
- Rainham Hall in Broadway

- Location within Greater London
- Population: 12,482 (Rainham and Wennington ward 2011)
- OS grid reference: TQ525825
  - Charing Cross: 13.6 mi (21.9 km) W
- London borough: Havering
- Ceremonial county: Greater London
- Region: London
- Country: England
- Sovereign state: United Kingdom
- Post town: RAINHAM
- Postcode district: RM13
- Dialling code: 01708
- Police: Metropolitan
- Fire: London
- Ambulance: London
- UK Parliament: Dagenham and Rainham
- London Assembly: Havering and Redbridge

Rainham (/ˈreɪnəm/ RAY-nəm) is a suburb of East London, England, in the London Borough of Havering. Historically an ancient parish in the county of Essex, Rainham is 13.6 miles (21.9 km) east of Charing Cross and is surrounded by a residential area, which has grown from the historic village, to the north and a commercial area, fronting the River Thames, to the south. As part of the suburban growth of London in the 20th century, Rainham significantly expanded and increased in population, becoming part of Hornchurch Urban District in 1934, and has formed part of Greater London since 1965. The economic history of Rainham is underpinned by a shift from agriculture to industry and manufacture and is now in a period of regeneration, coming within the London Riverside section of the Thames Gateway redevelopment area.

== History ==
=== Toponymy ===
Rainham (parish) population
1881	1,253
1891	1,669
1901	1,725
1911	1,972
1921	2,196
1931	3,897
1941	war #
1951	7,666
# no census was held due to war
source: UK census

Rainham is recorded in the Domesday Book of 1086 as Raineham and is thought to mean 'homestead or village of a man called Regna', formed from an Old English name and 'hām', meaning settlement. It is also possible that it follows Rainham, Kent which is thought to derive 'home of the Roegingas'. This is also of uncertain meaning, but could refer to 'the ruling people'. The link with Rainham in Kent is strengthened by the discovery of Jutish cemeteries in Rainham.

=== Bronze age ===
A hoard of 453 late bronze-age (900 to 800 BC) artefacts was found in Rainham in 2018. Known as the Havering hoard, it comprises swords, socketed axe heads, spear heads, knives, daggers, woodwork tools, bracelets, ingots, and other items, weighing more than 45 kg in total.

=== Economic development ===
For much of its history Rainham was an agricultural settlement, using the River Thames for trade. In the 16th century industry was limited to a boat-builder and tannery. There are links between Rainham farms and the City of London from the Middle Ages and after the wharf was redeveloped in the 1720s trade increased; including the bringing of muck from London for use in the fields. By 1929 most of the farmland had been given over to market gardening. The ferry to London was supplemented with new coaching links in the 18th century and a railway station opened in 1854. A second wharf was constructed in 1872 and from 1869 there was a growth in industrial development, including chemical and fertiliser factories. The Murex iron-founders moved to Rainham in 1917 and grew along the river, eventually becoming part of the British Oxygen Company. Away from the river, other industries included brickmaking and after World War II there was a growth in gravel extraction.

=== Local government ===
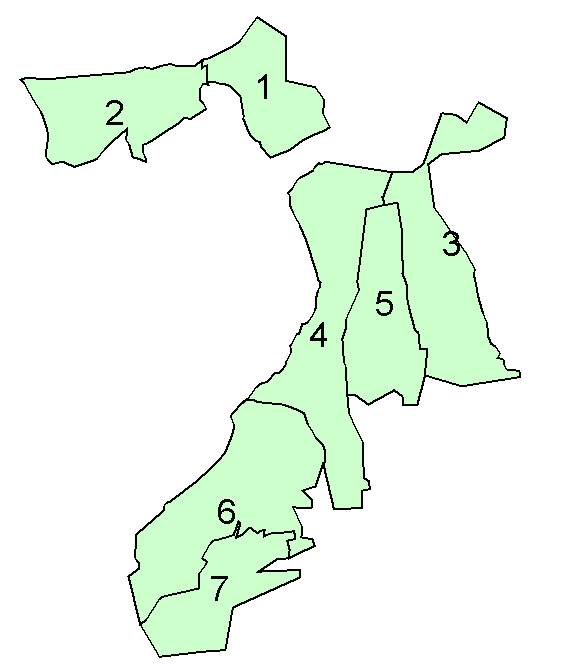
1931: Rainham (6) within Romford Rural District, adjoining Upminster (4) and Wennington (7)

Rainham formed an ancient parish of 3,253 acres (1,316 ha) in the Chafford hundred of Essex. In 1836 the vestry lost control of poor relief, with Rainham becoming part of the Romford Poor Law Union and in 1875 the parish became part of Romford rural sanitary district. Following the Local Government Act 1894, the sanitary district became Romford Rural District and a parish council was formed. The parish formed part of the London Traffic Area from 1924 and the London Passenger Transport Area from 1933. In 1934 the parish council was abolished and Rainham was combined with other parishes to form part of an expanded Hornchurch Urban District. On 1 April 1965 the civil parish was abolished and the urban district was abolished and its former area was combined with that of Municipal Borough of Romford; and since then has formed part of the London Borough of Havering in Greater London. At the 1951 census (one of the last before the abolition of the parish), Rainham had a population of 7666.

=== Urban development ===
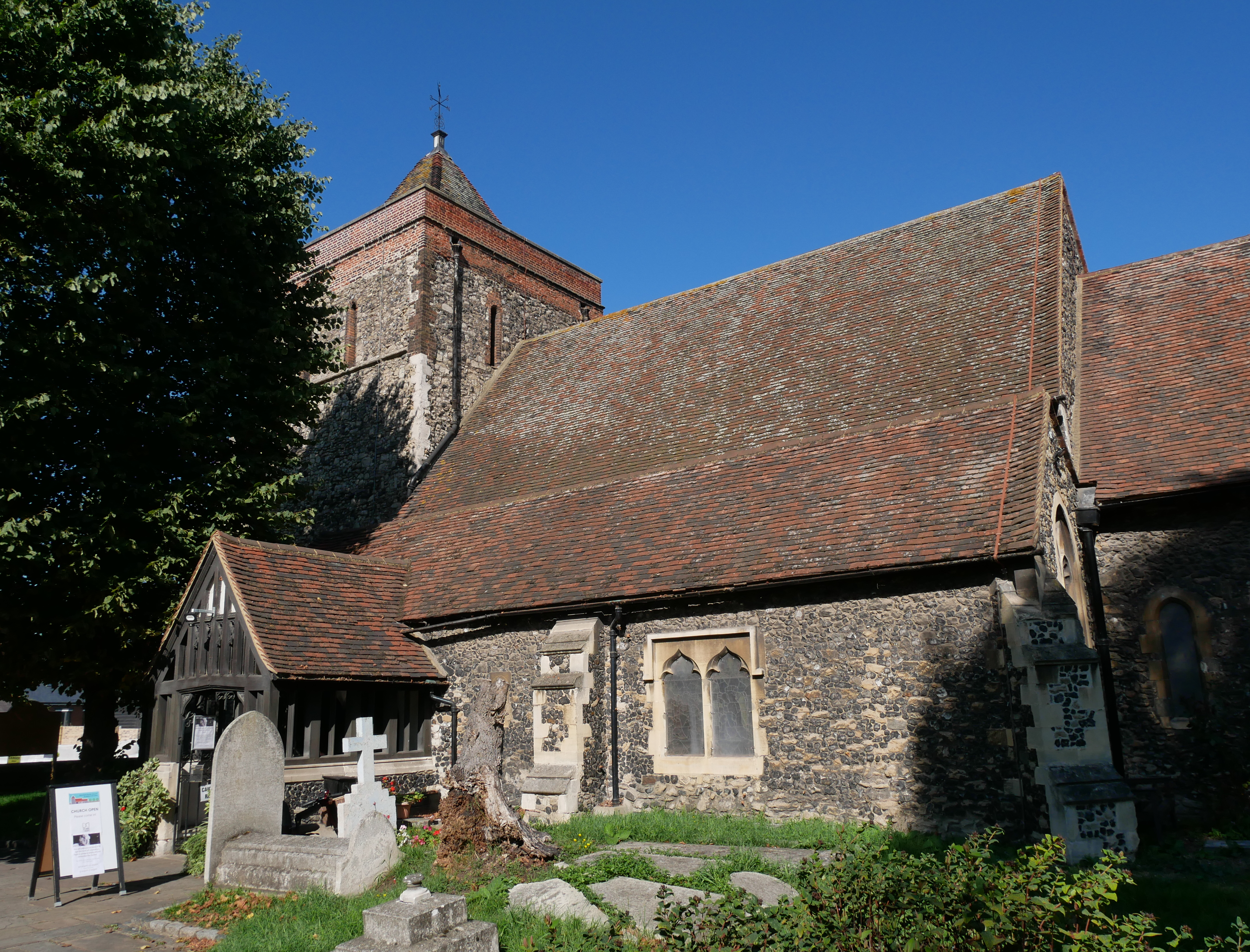
The medieval Church of St Helen and St Giles is the oldest building in Rainham

The earliest development was around the Church of St Helen and St Giles, and this is the only medieval building to survive. New prosperity from increased trade in the early 18th century led to several new buildings, including Rainham Hall. Roads were laid out in 1880 and the new developments consisted of semi-detached and terraced houses. At the same time a community developed around a pub on the river and operated as a resort for day-trippers. As the Thames industrialised it declined in popularity and was gone by 1945. Rainham developed into a suburb of London after World War I. As the estates were broken up for housing some land was purchased by smallholders from Bow and West Ham. In the 1940s they successfully campaigned against having it returned to agricultural use and it was excluded from the Metropolitan Green Belt. The roadways and sewerage systems did not keep up with the rate of growth and a residents' group fought for improvements in infrastructure throughout the 1960s.

== Governance ==
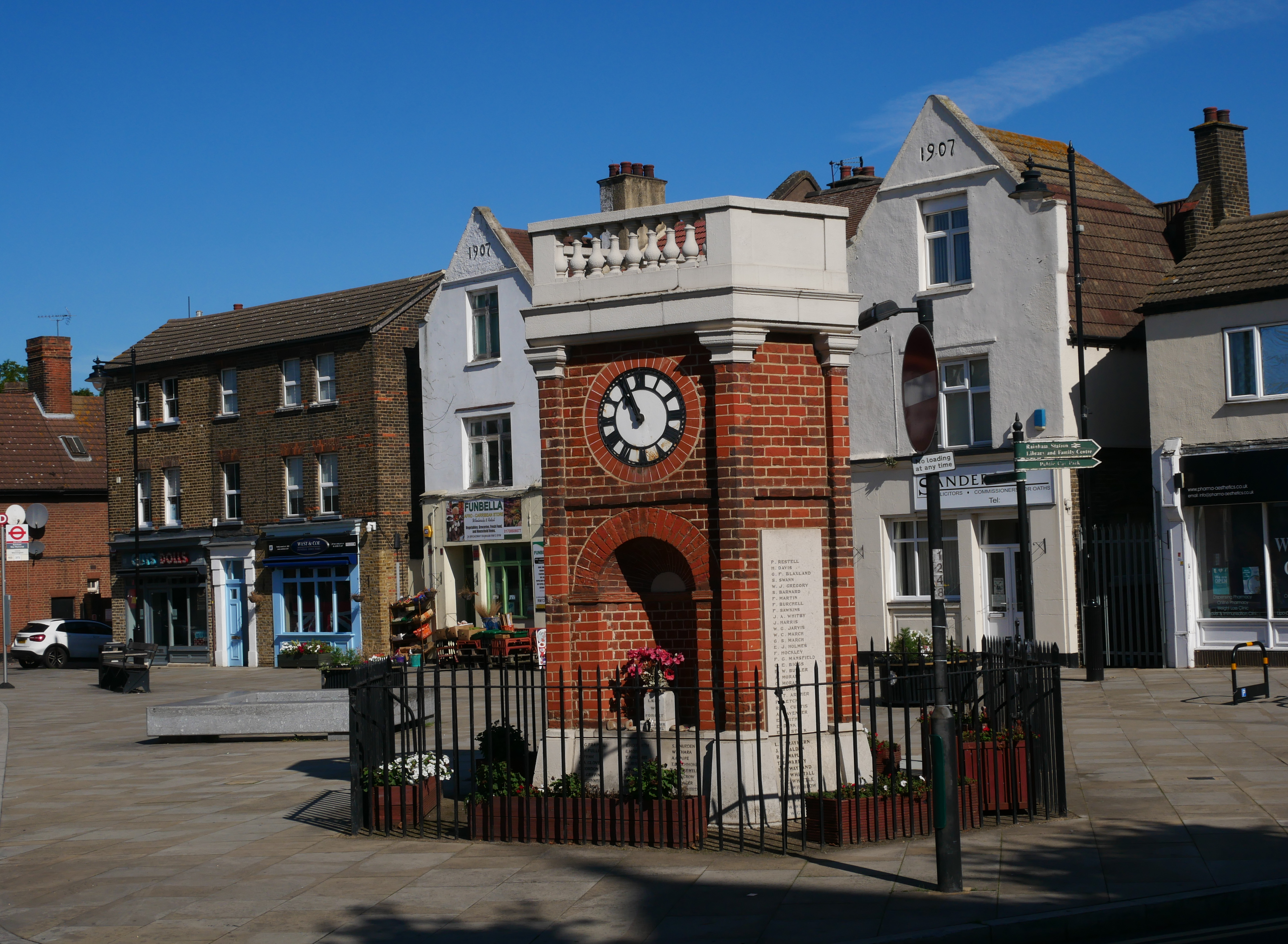
The clocktower is a World War I memorial and forms a focus of the town

The town forms part of the Dagenham and Rainham constituency, and is covered by the Havering ward of Rainham and Wennington. The constituency combines wards in southern Havering with eastern Barking and Dagenham. The Rainham and Wennington ward elects three councillors to Havering London Borough Council. All three councillors elected in 2010 were the Rainham and Wennington Residents Independent Association candidates and the area is unusual in that the residents' association is strongly active. Rainham is within the Havering and Redbridge London Assembly constituency and was in the London European Parliament constituency.

== Geography ==
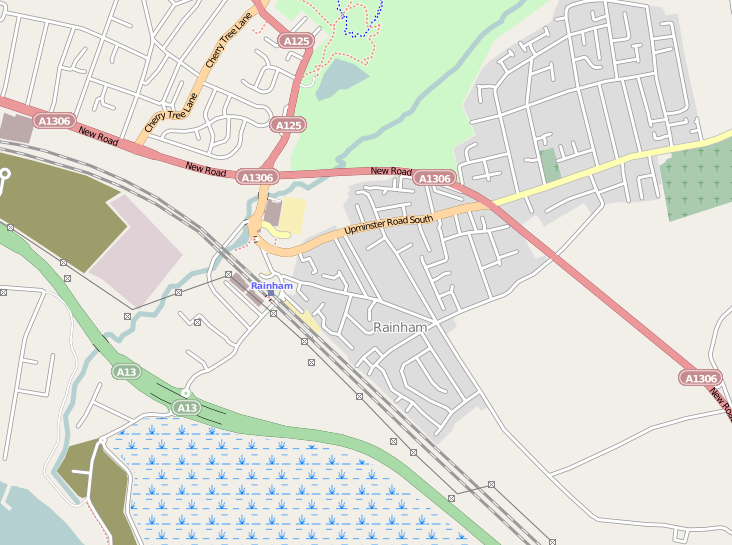
Map of Rainham

Rainham is mostly situated on gravel, rising to between 60 feet (18 m) and 100 feet (30 m). The marshlands along the southern boundary of the River Thames are about 5 feet (1.5 m) above sea level and a tidal section of the River Ingrebourne forms the western boundary. It is located in part of London that is susceptible to flooding. The historic core of Rainham, including the town centre, forms a conservation area. The land to the south has been affected by gravel extraction and 200 acres (0.81 km^{2}) of Rainham Marshes has been filled with 9 million tons of dredged soil by the Port of London Authority. Rainham is a post town in the RM postcode area; it covers a wide area of southern Havering and additionally includes Coldharbour, South Hornchurch and Wennington. Climate data is taken from the nearest weather station at Greenwich, around 8.7 miles (14.0 km) southwest of Rainham:

Climate data for Greenwich Park, elevation: 47 m (154 ft), 1991–2020 normals, extremes 1948–2004
Month	Jan	Feb	Mar	Apr	May	Jun	Jul	Aug	Sep	Oct	Nov	Dec	Year
Record high °C (°F)	16.8 (62.2)	19.7 (67.5)	23.3 (73.9)	25.3 (77.5)	29.0 (84.2)	34.5 (94.1)	35.3 (95.5)	37.5 (99.5)	30.2 (86.4)	26.1 (79.0)	18.9 (66.0)	16.4 (61.5)	37.5 (99.5)
Mean daily maximum °C (°F)	8.5 (47.3)	9.2 (48.6)	12.1 (53.8)	15.4 (59.7)	18.6 (65.5)	21.4 (70.5)	23.8 (74.8)	23.3 (73.9)	20.3 (68.5)	15.8 (60.4)	11.6 (52.9)	8.9 (48.0)	15.8 (60.4)
Daily mean °C (°F)	5.9 (42.6)	6.2 (43.2)	8.4 (47.1)	10.7 (51.3)	13.8 (56.8)	16.7 (62.1)	18.8 (65.8)	18.7 (65.7)	15.9 (60.6)	12.4 (54.3)	8.8 (47.8)	6.3 (43.3)	11.9 (53.4)
Mean daily minimum °C (°F)	3.4 (38.1)	3.2 (37.8)	4.7 (40.5)	6.0 (42.8)	9.1 (48.4)	12.0 (53.6)	13.9 (57.0)	14.1 (57.4)	11.6 (52.9)	9.0 (48.2)	6.1 (43.0)	3.8 (38.8)	8.1 (46.6)
Record low °C (°F)	−12.7 (9.1)	−9.4 (15.1)	−6.7 (19.9)	−4.8 (23.4)	−1.0 (30.2)	1.1 (34.0)	5.0 (41.0)	5.3 (41.5)	1.1 (34.0)	−2.1 (28.2)	−8.0 (17.6)	−10.5 (13.1)	−12.7 (9.1)
Average precipitation mm (inches)	43.9 (1.73)	39.9 (1.57)	36.5 (1.44)	38.6 (1.52)	44.0 (1.73)	49.3 (1.94)	36.3 (1.43)	53.0 (2.09)	52.4 (2.06)	58.3 (2.30)	59.9 (2.36)	50.7 (2.00)	562.9 (22.16)
Average precipitation days (≥ 1.0 mm)	10.5	9.2	7.9	8.1	7.9	7.8	7.1	8.2	7.9	10.3	10.6	10.2	105.6
Mean monthly sunshine hours	44.4	66.1	109.7	152.9	198.7	198.6	209.2	198.0	140.6	99.7	58.5	50.1	1,526.4
Source 1: Met Office
Source 2: Starlings Roost Weather

== Demography ==
Rainham and Wennington ethnicity by census year
Statistic	1991	2001	2011	2021
Ethnic group
White British & Irish	11,345	11,168	10,176	8634
White Other	-	140	351	950
Mixed	-	153	330	507
Black	261	273	947	1594
Asian	391	341	607	1,525
Chinese/Other	63	39	71	268
White Total:	11,345	11,308	10,527	9,632
Ethnic Minority Total:	715	804	1955	3935
Total:	12,060	12,114	12,482	13,567
Percentage
White British & Irish	94.07%	92.1%	81.6%	63.8%
White Other	-	1.2%	2.8%	7.3%
Mixed	-	1.3%	2.6%	3.7%
Black	2.16%	2.3%	7.6%	11.7%
Asian	3.24%	2.8%	4.9%	11.2%
Chinese/Other	0.52%	0.3%	0.6%	2.3%
White Total	94.07%	93.3%	83.4%	71%
Ethnic Minority Total	5.93%	6.70%	15.60%	29%

Demographic data is produced by the Office for National Statistics for the ward of Rainham and Wennington. In 2001 the population of the ward was 12,114, consisting of 3,362 families and 4,811 households. The population is 93.35% White, 2.81% Asian, 2.25% Black and 0.32% Chinese or other. 75.58% report their religion as Christian compared to 76.13% for Havering, 58.23% in London and 71.74% in England. 12.04% report having no religion, compared to 13.18% in Havering, 15.76% in London and 14.59% in England.

At the 2001 census, there were 4,589 residents who fell into the social category ABC1, which equated to 37.9% of the population in the ward of Rainham and Wennington. The age distribution was: 5.32% aged 0–4, 15.63% aged 5–15, 5.02% aged 16–19, 33.78% aged 20–44, 24.92% aged 45–64 and 15.32% aged 65 years and older. The general health was described as follows: 70.49% good, 21.52% fairly good and 7.99% not good. 16.41% of people had a limiting long-term illness.

== Economy ==
The northern part of Rainham is identified in the London Plan as a local district centre with 20,000 square metres (220,000 sq ft) of commercial floorspace. Within Havering, it is identified as one of seven town centres in the borough, with a retail area extending along Upminster Road South and Broadway.

The southern part of Rainham is a centre for employment, part of the London Riverside business improvement district, and the location of the Tilda Rice main plant. Several large companies have operations and offices based in Rainham, including Keebles, Carpetright, Harveys Furniture, and Rainham Steel.

The plans of the London Thames Gateway Development Corporation include 3,200 new homes and the upgrading of run-down industrial and warehouse facilities on the A1306 road to provide mixed-use development. In 2006 Havering London Borough Council proposed that land in Rainham could be used for a large regional casino.

=== Riverside sewage treatment works ===
The Riverside sewage treatment works is located off Manor Way adjacent to Rainham Creek; it is designed to treat up to 94,000 cubic metres per day of sewage. About 16,300 cubic metres per day is from factories; these factories contributed to the construction of the plant instead of paying a charge for the treatment of waste. The outfall of treated effluent is from the southern corner of the works into Rainham Creek (the tidal reach of the River Ingrebourne), and thence into the river Thames.

Sewage sludge was disposed of by dumping at sea at the Black Deep in the outer Thames Estuary, until this practice was banned in 1998. From 1998 to 2012 the sludge produced at Riverside was pumped to Beckton sewage works for treatment and incineration. In 2012 anaerobic digestion facilities were installed at Riverside, enabling the plant to turn solid waste into enough renewable energy to power the site. As of March 2025, a £120 million upgrade is planned, with tenders likely to be invited beginning June 2025.

== Culture ==
Havering Council's urban strategy recognises that nearby Hornchurch is the main cultural hub of the borough with a large theatre and arts spaces, and Romford offers the largest regional concentration of entertainment facilities.

Professional wrestler and All Elite Wrestling world champion Will Ospreay was born in Rainham

== Transport ==
The A1306 road passes through Rainham and acts an alternative route to the main A13 road between Central London and the Dartford Crossing. High Speed 1 and the London, Tilbury & Southend line pass through the area, with Rainham railway station served by c2c train services running between Fenchurch Street in the City of London and Grays in Thurrock and is in London fare zone 6.

Several London bus routes serve Rainham, including routes 103, 165, 287, 372 and SL12, which provide connections to Barking, Elm Park, Hornchurch, Lakeside and Romford. London Buses route 652 also serves Rainham during school-day journeys however only twice in the morning and once in the afternoon but provides connections to Hornchurch, Upminster Bridge and Upminster. As well as this, a closed-door commercial service numbered Z2 operated by First Essex also provides connections to Amazon workers to Canning Town, Barking, Dagenham and Tilbury at Rainham Tesco.

The London Loop key walking route passes through Rainham, and it forms the end point of section 23 from Upminster Bridge and the starting point of section 24 to Purfleet.

The Belvedere Crossing is a proposed tunnel or bridge, between Belvedere and Rainham

On 26 May 2003, Mayor Question Time, then London Assembly member for Havering and Redbridge Roger Evans asked former Mayor of London Ken Livingstone what progress had been made in convincing the government of extending the Docklands Light Railway to Rainham, the mayor responded by saying Rainham would be linked to the DLR at Dagenham Dock by the East London Transit.

== See also ==
- List of people from Havering
- List of schools in Havering
- Launders Lane fires
