= Gaynes School =

Location
- Brackendale Gardens; Upminster, Greater London, RM14 3UX; England
- Coordinates: 51.5466°N 0.2523°E

Information
- Type: Academy
- Established: 1936
- Local authority: Havering
- Trust: Loxford School Trust
- Department for Education URN: 144095 Tables
- Ofsted: Reports
- Headteacher: Annabelle Kirkpatrick
- Gender: Coeducational
- Age: 11 to 16
- Website: http://www.gaynesschool.net/

Gaynes School is a coeducational secondary school situated on Brackendale Gardens, Upminster, in the London Borough of Havering, London, England.

Opened in 1936, the school celebrated its 75th anniversary in 2011. The school takes its name from the medieval manor of Gaynes in Upminster, which was held by the d'Engayne family from 1218 to circa 1360.

Previously a community school administered by Havering London Borough Council, in July 2018 Gaynes School converted to academy status. The school is now sponsored by the Loxford School Trust.
