= Pages Wood =

Woodland and park in London, England

Coordinates: 51.586°N 0.2465°E

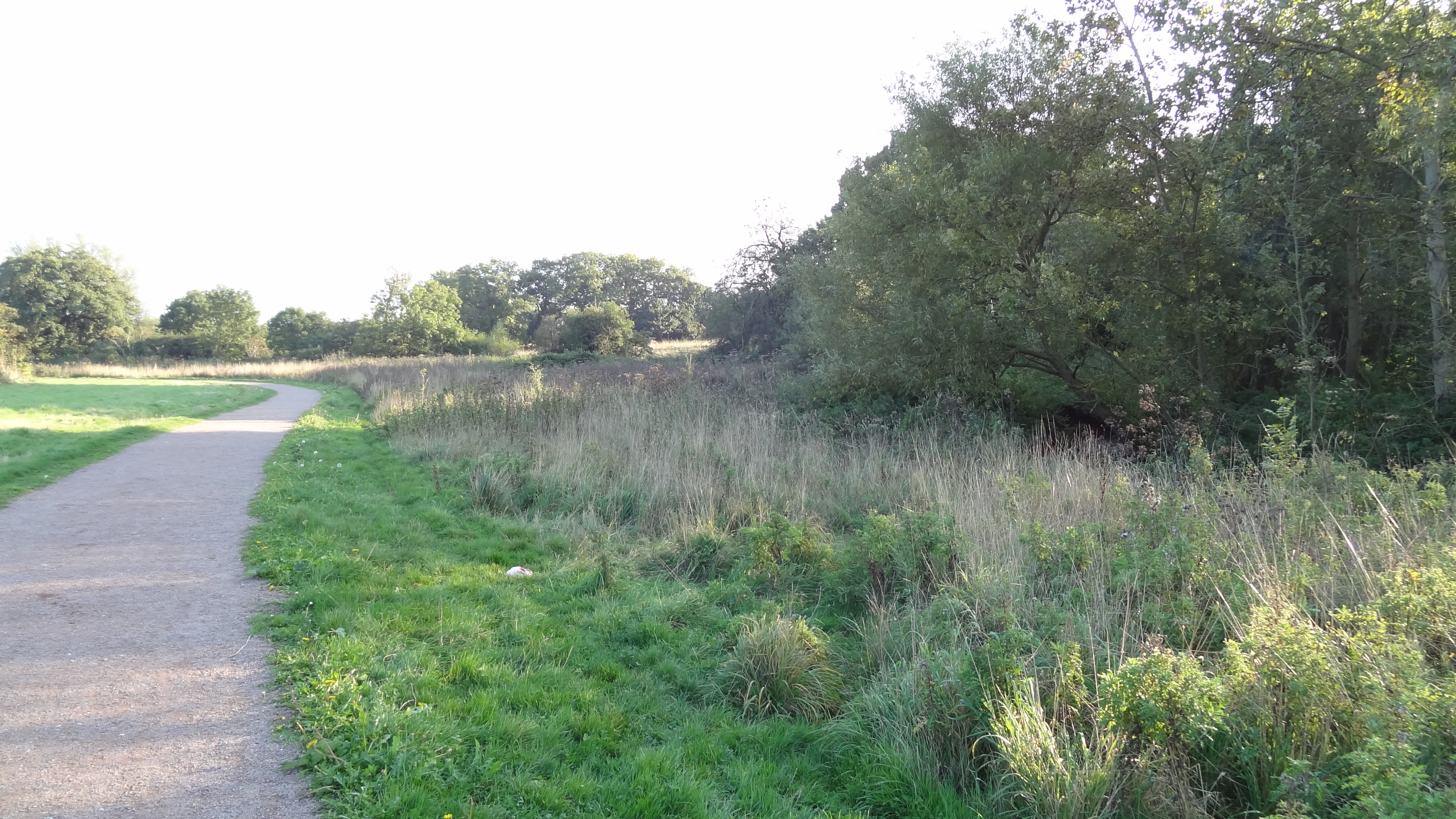
Pages Wood

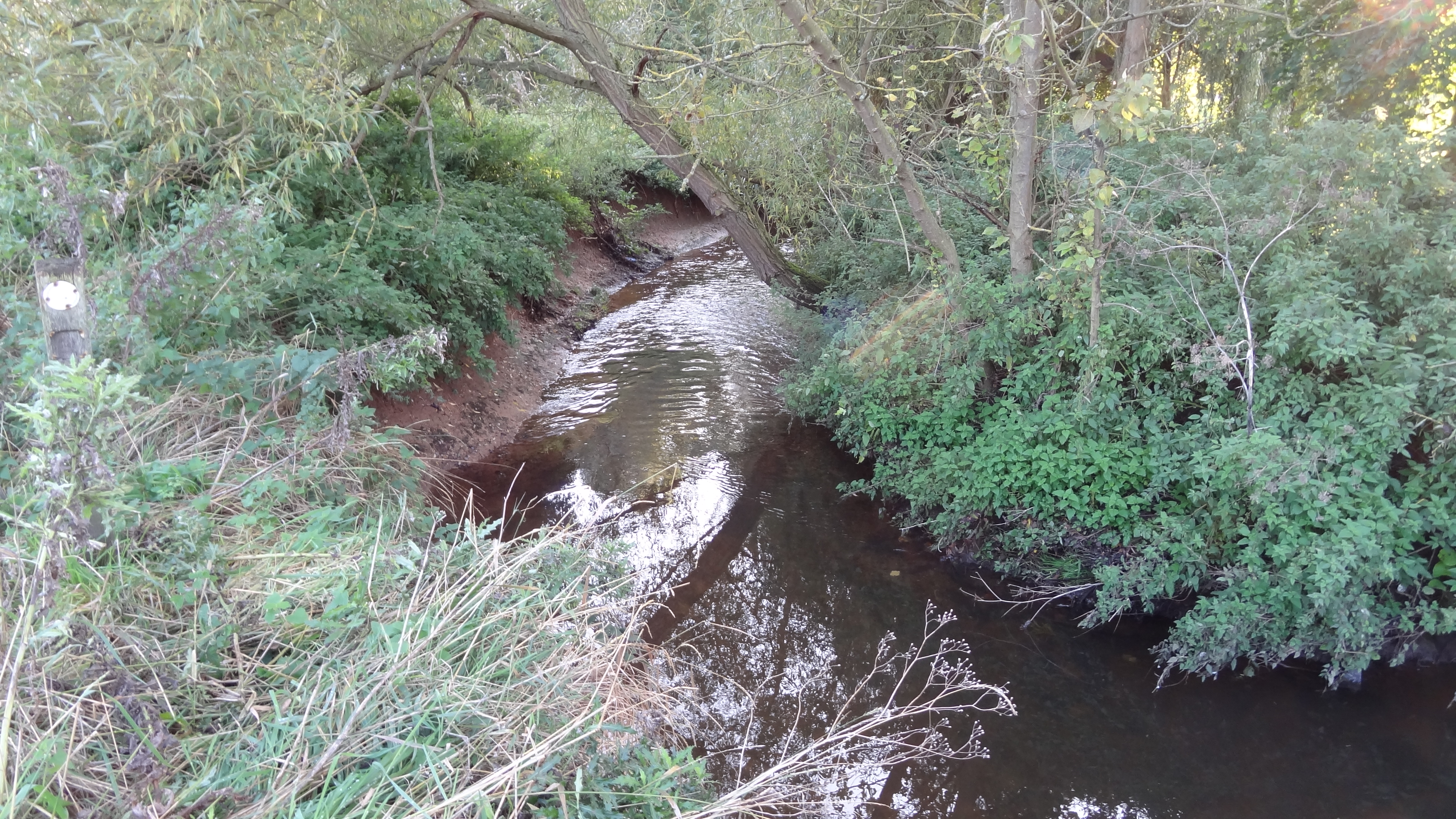
River Ingrebourne

Pages Wood is a 74 hectare wood and public park in Harold Wood in the London Borough of Havering. It is the largest Forestry England site in the Thames Chase Community Forest, and 100,000 trees have been planted since it opened in 2002. It also has meadow areas, 6.5 kilometres of footpaths and 2.2 kilometres of bridlepaths.

Its north west boundary is separated from Harold Wood Park by the River Ingrebourne, and the river runs through the south west corner. The London Loop goes through the park. There is access from Hall Lane, where there is a car park, and by a bridge over the river from Harold Wood Park.
