= A Christmas Carol (TV series) =

2019 British television drama series

- Genre: Fantasy; Horror fiction
- Based on: A Christmas Carol by Charles Dickens
- Written by: Steven Knight
- Directed by: Nick Murphy
- Starring: Guy Pearce; Andy Serkis; Stephen Graham; Charlotte Riley; Joe Alwyn; Vinette Robinson; Johnny Harris; Jason Flemyng
- Composers: Volker Bertelmann; Dustin O'Halloran
- Country of origin: United Kingdom
- Original language: English
- No. of episodes: 3

Production
- Executive producers: Steven Knight; Tom Hardy; Ridley Scott; Dean Baker; David W. Zucker; Kate Crowe; Mona Qureshi; Piers Wenger
- Producer: Julian Stevens
- Cinematography: Si Bell
- Running time: 53–58 minutes
- Production companies: Scott Free; Hardy Son & Baker; BBC; FXP

Original release
- Network: FX
- Release: 19 December 2019
- Network: BBC One
- Release: 22 December – 24 December 2019

A Christmas Carol is a 2019 British television dark fantasy drama based on the 1843 novella by Charles Dickens. The three-part series is written by Steven Knight with Tom Hardy and Ridley Scott among the executive producers. It began airing on BBC One in the UK on 22 December 2019 and concluded two days later on 24 December 2019. Prior to this, it aired in the US on FX on 19 December 2019, with all three episodes shown consecutively as a single television film.

Filming locations include Rainham Hall in East London and Lord Leycester Hospital in Warwick. Cast members include Guy Pearce, Andy Serkis, Stephen Graham, Charlotte Riley, Johnny Harris, Jason Flemyng, Vinette Robinson and Joe Alwyn. This adaptation was meant to present a darker take on the classic story, aimed at an adult audience. The drama involves adult language, brief nudity, horror elements, implications of child molestation, forced prostitution and a depiction of a child drowning.

== Plot summary ==
Jacob Marley awakes in his grave after a scarred boy urinates on his headstone. Meanwhile, Marley's business partner Ebenezer Scrooge is in his office where he works as an asset stripper, with extensive industrial interests. The miserly Scrooge resents people who cherish Christmas, and tells his nephew Fred that if people were as good as they claim to be during the festive season then they would be so during the entire year. Meanwhile, Scrooge's clerk Bob Cratchit, and his wife Mary, struggle to survive and raise their children, especially the disabled Tim.

Marley begs God to let him rest, and is delivered to Purgatory, where a blacksmith's spirit puts him in a suit of chains and lockboxes. The Ghost of Christmas Past tells Marley he will not have eternal rest unless he helps Scrooge find redemption. Marley visits Scrooge, shows him the exploited workers in their mills and sweatshops, and explains that each link of his chains represents a life lost because of their greed. He warns Scrooge that the same fate awaits him unless he heeds the three spirits who will visit him on Christmas Eve.

The Ghost of Christmas Past arrives, and shows Scrooge visions of his past by taking on different guises. One vision shows Scrooge as a child at a boarding school, where he was made to stay during the Christmas season and was sexually abused by the schoolmaster. Scrooge learns his father knew of the abuse and allowed it in exchange for the schoolmaster waiving attendance fees. Scrooge's sister Lottie rescued him one year, telling him their father was out of the family and, unbeknownst to Scrooge, threatening to shoot the schoolmaster if he ever touched her brother again.

The Ghost then shows Scrooge a Christmas during which Mary asked Scrooge for £30 so Tim could have a life-saving surgery. Scrooge offered to give her the money if she came to his apartment on Christmas Day. She did, and Scrooge made Mary admit she was willing to prostitute herself to save her child, and watched her undress. He then said that he did not desire her, but that he wished to see her abandon her morals for money. Scrooge paid her and threatened to tell her husband if he should ever leave his employ. Humiliated, Mary told Scrooge that one day she would show him his true self in a "mirror", stating that she had "the power to summon such spirits."

The Ghost of Christmas Present appears, in the form of the long-deceased Lottie, Fred's mother. She and Scrooge watch the Cratchit family celebrating Christmas together. Mary lies to Bob about where she got the money, telling him that she stole a pair of diamond earrings and sold them. Bob announces he will resign from Scrooge's employment in the morning, as he has found another job. Scrooge wishes to tell Mary he will not reveal their arrangement to Bob, but, sensing his presence, Mary tells him to leave.

The Ghost of Christmas Future appears as a man in black with his mouth sewn shut. Scrooge then sees Tim skating on a frozen pond, and falling through the ice and dying of the cold. The Ghost then shows Scrooge his own corpse, alone, with no one mourning his death. Marley arrives and talks of redemption, but Scrooge says he does not deserve forgiveness and will accept his fate, if only Tim will live.

Marley is returned to his grave to rest eternally, and Tim's grave vanishes as Scrooge is transported back to the present Christmas Day. Scrooge runs to the pond behind the Cratchit's house, scattering gravel on the ice to prevent Tim's death.

He visits the Cratchits, wishes Bob well in his new job, and gives him £500, announcing he is closing down his business. Mary thanks Scrooge for the money, but says it will not buy her forgiveness. He replies he does not want or deserve forgiveness, but simply wants to be the best person he can be, and thanks her for summoning the spirits. After he leaves, Mary tells the three spirits that there is still much work to do.

== Cast ==
- Guy Pearce as Ebenezer Scrooge
  - Billy Barratt as Young Ebenezer Scrooge
- Andy Serkis as Ghost of Christmas Past
  - Kayvan Novak as the Ghost in the form of Ali Baba
  - Gruffudd Glyn as the Ghost in the form of a Welsh coal miner
  - Paul Chahidi as the Ghost in the form of a mill owner
- Stephen Graham as Jacob Marley
- Charlotte Riley as Lottie Scrooge/Ghost of Christmas Present
- Joe Alwyn as Bob Cratchit
- Vinette Robinson as Mary Cratchit
- Jason Flemyng as Ghost of Christmas Future
- Lenny Rush as Tiny Tim Cratchit
- Johnny Harris as Franklin Scrooge, Ebenezer’s father
- Adam Nagaitis as Fred, Ebenezer’s nephew
- Adrian Lukis as the Headmaster
- Remmie Milner as Martha Cratchit, Bob Cratchit's Daughter
- Tiarna Williams as Belinda Cratchit, Bob Cratchit's Daughter

== Production ==
It was announced in November 2017 that the BBC had commissioned a new telling of the Dickens tale, with Steven Knight writing the three-part series. Knight, Tom Hardy and Ridley Scott would serve as executive producers.

In January 2019, it was reported that Hardy would also be starring in the series; however, the role he would be playing was not disclosed (Hardy did not appear in the final version). In May, Guy Pearce was revealed to be playing Scrooge, alongside the castings of Andy Serkis, Stephen Graham, Charlotte Riley, Johnny Harris, Joe Alwyn, Vinette Robinson and Kayvan Novak. Rutger Hauer, who was originally cast as Ghost of Christmas Future, became too ill to film his scenes and was replaced by Jason Flemyng (Hauer died on 19 July 2019).

Filming on the series commenced by May 2019 at Rainham Hall, a 1729-built National Trust site in the London Borough of Havering. Scenes were filmed on Church Row, Hampstead and the churchyard of St John-at-Hampstead in May. In early June, filming took place at the Lord Leycester Hospital in Warwick.

== Episodes ==
No.	Title	Directed by	Written by	Original release date	UK Air date	UK viewers (millions)
1	"Chapter One: The Human Beast"	Nick Murphy	Steven Knight	19 December 2019	22 December 2019	7.83
2	"Chapter Two: The Human Heart"	Nick Murphy	Steven Knight	19 December 2019 (FX)	23 December 2019	6.01
3	"Chapter Three: A Bag of Gravel"	Nick Murphy	Steven Knight	19 December 2019	24 December 2019	5.31

On the BBC's iPlayer service, episode 1 had 1.6 million requests, episode 2 had 1.03 million requests and episode 3 had 900,000 requests. It was the sixth most watched programme on iPlayer during the Christmas fortnight of 20 December to 2 January. FX broadcast all three episodes on 19 December in the United States as one episode. The full-length serial is available to stream on Hulu as of 2020. On 24 December 2021 Disney+ also released it internationally, excluding UK and Ireland, as a single episode via the Star hub and as a Star Original.

== Reception ==
=== Ratings ===
Episode 1 was the most watched TV show for the entire week ending 22 December in the UK, with 7,330,443 viewers watching within seven days of the first broadcast. The subsequent two episodes failed to register in the top 15 BBC1 broadcasts for week ending 29 December, achieving fewer than 5,887,097 viewers.

According to Deadline Hollywood, there were 1.4 million fewer viewers for the second episode on BBC One; representing a 30% drop from the first episode.

=== Critical reception ===
According to review aggregator Rotten Tomatoes, 52% of 25 critics have given the series a positive review, with an average rating of 6.2/10. The website's critical consensus reads, "This radical retelling of Charles Dickens' classic parable struggles to justify its oppressive tone and edgy flourishes, although Guy Pearce is suitably haunting as the haunted Ebenezer Scrooge." Pearce's performance received a great deal of praise.

Radio Times awarded the drama four stars out of five and opined that at times the script "feels more Shakespearean than Dickensian." Evening Standard compared it to Peaky Blinders and praised the performances of the actors.

Reception from American outlets was less positive. The Hollywood Reporter described the adaptation as "designed to alienate the Dickens brand's traditional core audience and probably won't much engage the curiosity of more mature viewers." Salon referred to it as a "dispiriting adaptation", calling it "short on joy and very, very, very long on purgatorial slogging." Collider gave it two stars and acknowledged that the story "certainly brings something new to the tried-and-true story" but found the ending "misses out on the meaning of the story and the greater meaning of the Christmas season." Nick Allen of RogerEbert.com also gave it two stars and described viewing it as "approximately three joyless hours of watching an adaptation try to justify its edginess." The A.V. Club gave it a C− rating, remarking on the "unrelenting dourness."

== See also ==
- Adaptations of A Christmas Carol
- List of Christmas films
