= Bretons Manor =

Building in London Borough of Havering, London, England

Bretons
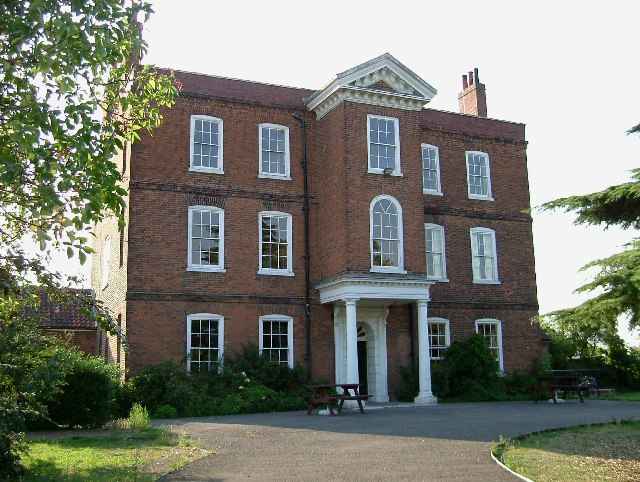
- Bretons House
- Interactive map of the Bretons area

General information
- Location: Rainham Road, Hornchurch
- Coordinates: 51.5423°N 0.186112°E
- Current tenants: Bretons Community Association
- Opened: 1742
- Owner: Havering London Borough Council

Listed Building – Grade II*
- Official name: Bretons
- Designated: 7 January 1955; 71 years ago
- Reference no.: 1079875

Bretons is a Grade II* listed building and grounds in Hornchurch, in the London Borough of Havering. There has been a house on the site since the 12th century and it has been in local authority ownership since 1869. It was used as a sewage farm from 1869 to 1969. The house is now known as Bretons Manor and is occupied by the Bretons Community Association. The 172 acres (0.70 km^{2}) grounds are used as the Bretons Outdoor Recreation Centre.

== History ==
The manor, located adjacent to the River Beam in the parish of Hornchurch, is believed to have been named after the Breton family, who lived there from the 12th century.

The surviving building is a historic manor house that was rebuilt around 1740 with some features retained from an earlier building.

In 1869 Bretons was bought by the Romford Local Board and was used as a sewage farm until 1969. The first tenant of the farm was William Hope. It passed to Havering London Borough Council who redeveloped it as a recreation centre, now known as the Bretons Outdoor Recreation Centre.

Bretons house was listed on 7 January 1955. Other features of Bretons are separately listed.

In 2014 Bretons was connected to Beam Valley Country Park when a new pedestrian and cycling bridge was installed over the River Beam by Sustrans.

== Current use ==
The house is now occupied and maintained by the Bretons Community Association (charity number 1067432). The 172 acres (0.70 km^{2}) grounds are laid out as the Bretons Outdoor Recreation Centre.
