= Beam Valley Country Park =

Park in Dagenham, London, England

Coordinates: 51.544°N 0.179°E

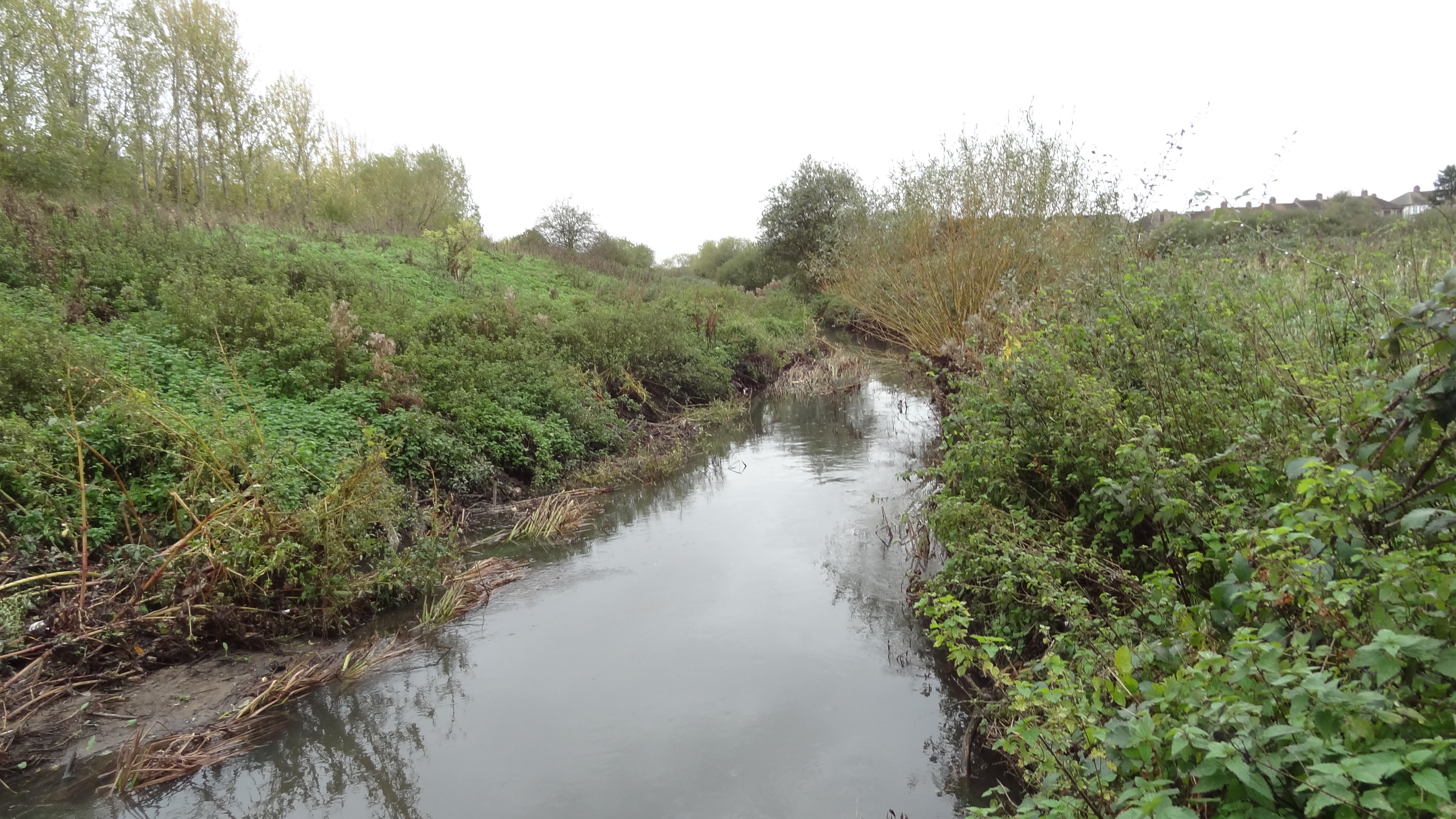
River Beam in Beam Valley Country Park

Beam Valley Country Park is a 74-hectare park in Dagenham in the London Borough of Barking and Dagenham. Most of it is designated as a Local Nature Reserve (LNR) called Beam Valley, but a narrow strip next to the River Beam south from Western Avenue is a separate LNR called Beam Valley (Environment Agency). The park is also designated as two Sites of Borough Importance for Nature Conservation, Grade 1, one north and the other south of South Dagenham Road.

The park was formerly derelict land. It has woodland and grassland, former gravel pits and the River Beam and Wantz Stream. Birds found on the site include kingfishers, reed warblers, reed buntings and skylarks. There is archaeological evidence that the site has been used since the Stone Age, and it also has a Roman pottery kiln.

In 2014 Beam Valley Country Park was connected to Bretons Manor when a new pedestrian and cycling bridge was installed over the River Beam by Sustrans.
