= Church of St Helen and St Giles =

Church in East London, England

Coordinates: 51.5183°N 0.1905°E

St Helen and St Giles
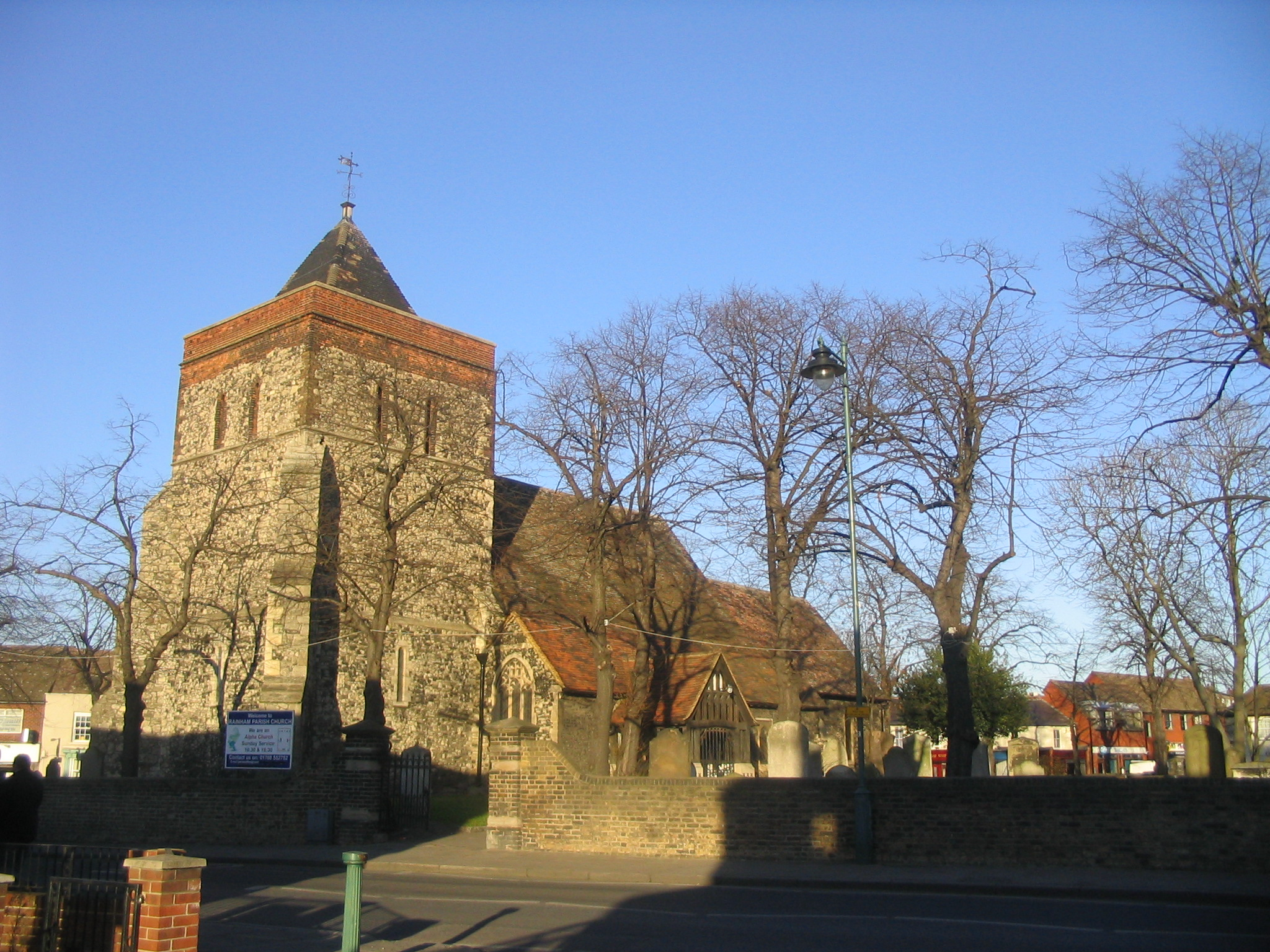
- St Helen and St Giles
- St Helen and St Giles
- Denomination: Church of England (Anglican)

Administration
- Province: Canterbury
- Diocese: Chelmsford
- Archdeaconry: Chelsea
- Deanery: Havering

St Helen and St Giles is a church and landmark of Rainham and is the oldest building in the London Borough of Havering (being Norman). The church retains many of its original features, for example the round-headed arches. It was founded by Richard de Lucy. de Lucy was also one of the instigators of the assassination of Thomas Becket, the Archbishop of Canterbury, in 1170. Construction of the church took place between 1160 and 1170. The church was restored during the period of 1893–1906, using donations from the Freemasons, yet it is still thought to closely resemble its original condition.

The Rectory Manor, also known as Parsonage Farm, was initially part of Rainham Manor, but in 1178 the King granted it to Lesnes Abbey, which owned it until the Dissolution of the Monasteries, when it was conveyed to Cardinal Wolsey. After Wolsey's fall the Rectory Manor fell to Sir Robert Southwell, and eventually to a group of five Londoners. In 1714 Rectory Manor was reunited with Jordans Manor by William Blackborrne of Hornchurch, who left the two manors to Lincoln's Inn barrister Levett Blackborne, grandson of Sir Richard Levett, Lord Mayor of London. On Levett Blackborne's death, the combined manor was sold to the Crosse family of Berwick manor, who owned it into the twentieth century, when it was broken up for development.
