= Upminster Hall =

Building in Upminster, London, England

Coordinates: 51.5663°N 0.2579°E

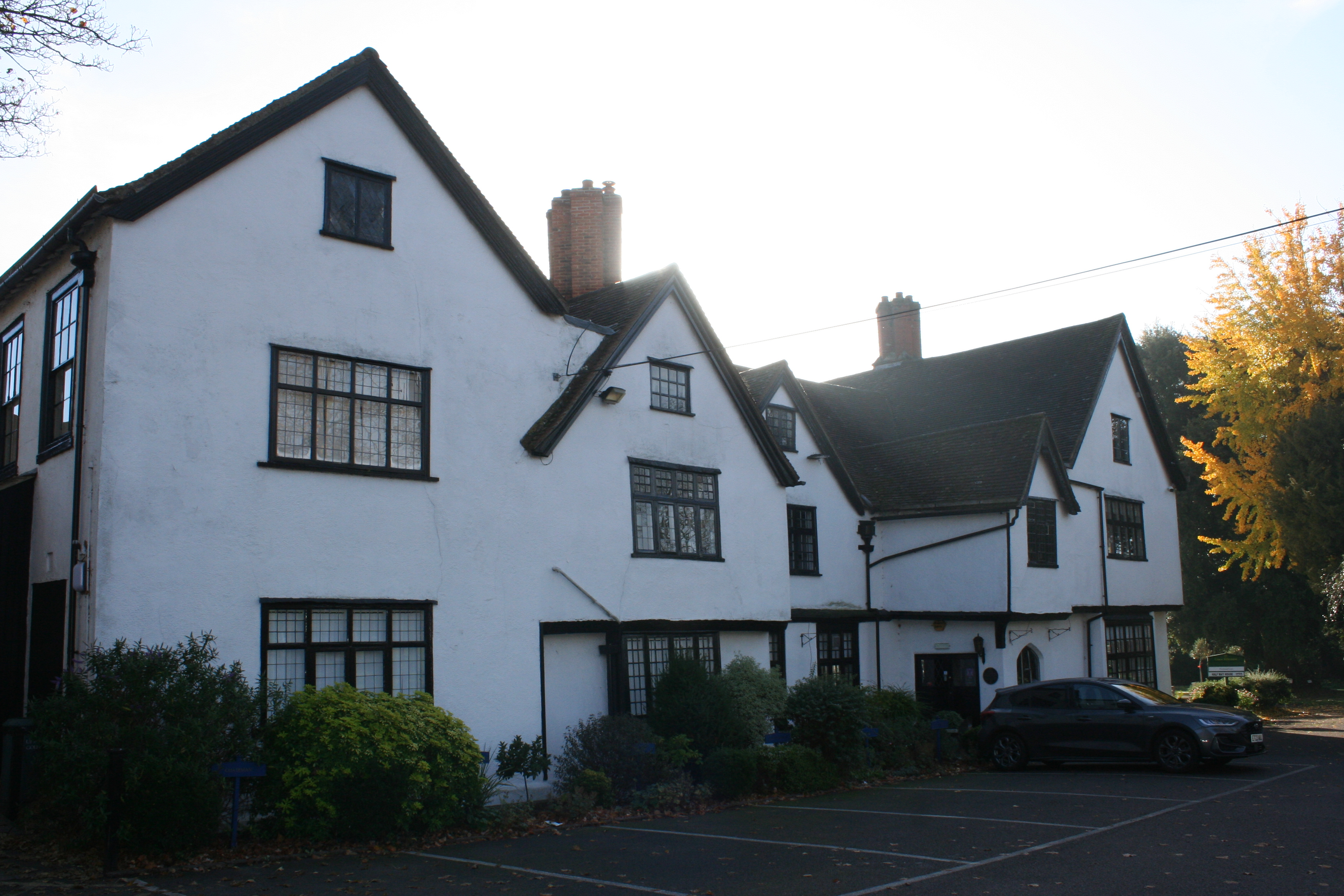
The hall in November 2025

Upminster Hall is a historic house in Upminster, London, England. It is now the clubhouse of the Upminster Golf Club.

== History ==
King Harold II gave the manor of Upminster Hall to the abbots of Waltham Abbey in around the year 1050. The present house, which dates from circa 1500, remained in the ownership of the abbey until the Dissolution of the Monasteries in 1536, when Henry VIII gave it to Thomas Cromwell. It was then occupied by the Latham family from 1543 until it passed to Edward Noel, later 1st Earl of Gainsborough, in 1677. It was then owned by the Branfil family from 1685 until it was bought by Major Godfrey Pike in 1921. It became the clubhouse of Upminster Golf Club in 1927. It has been listed Grade II* on the National Heritage List for England since January 1955.
