= Upminster =

Town in East London

Coordinates: 51.555743°N 0.251239°E

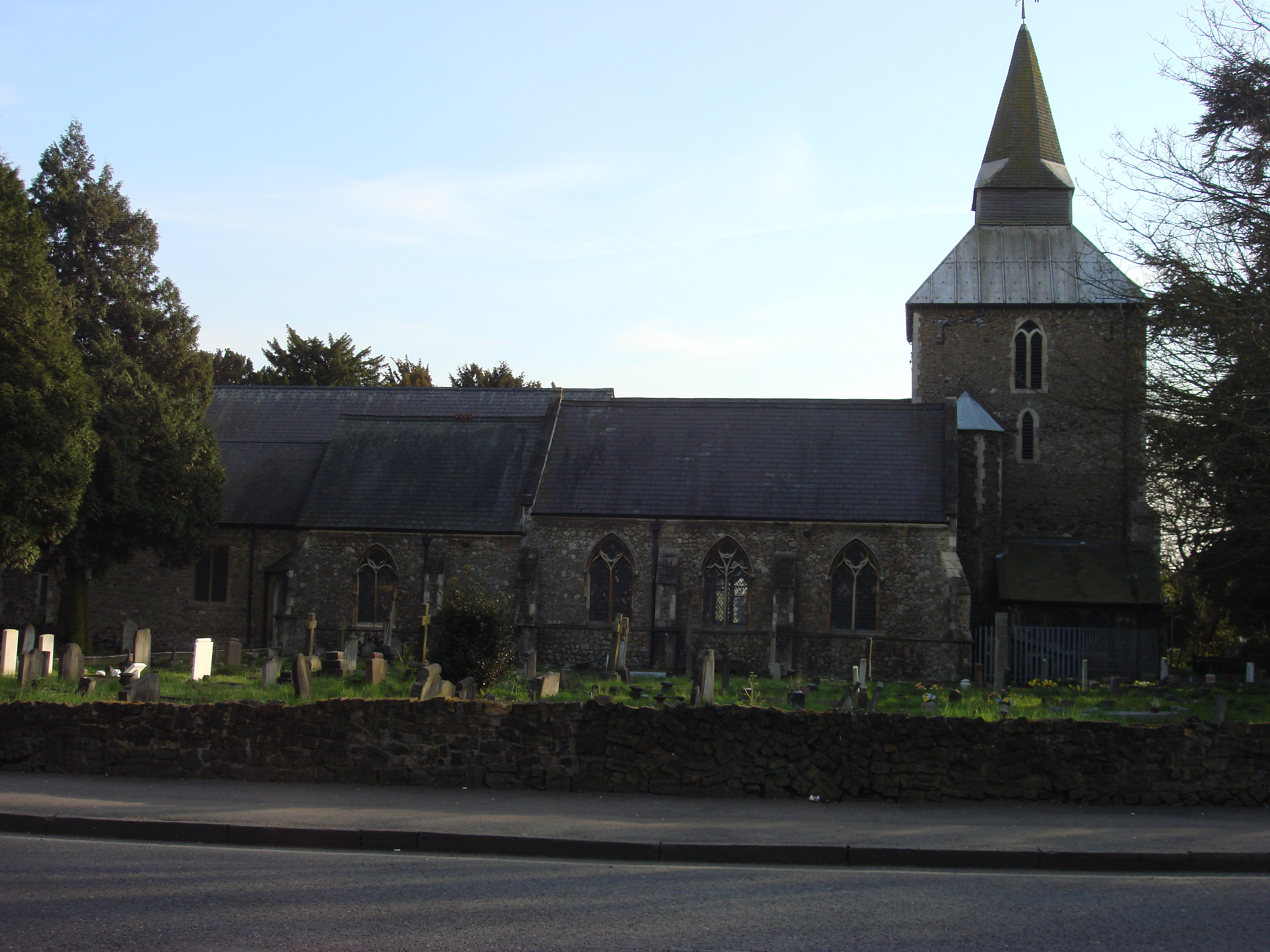
- Church of St Laurence

- Location within Greater London
- Population: 25,361 (Cranham and Upminster wards 2011)
- OS grid reference: TQ560865
  - Charing Cross: 16.5 mi (26.6 km) WSW
- London borough: Havering
- Ceremonial county: Greater London
- Region: London
- Country: England
- Sovereign state: United Kingdom
- Post town: UPMINSTER
- Postcode district: RM14
- Dialling code: 01708
- Police: Metropolitan
- Fire: London
- Ambulance: London
- UK Parliament: Hornchurch and Upminster
- London Assembly: Havering and Redbridge

Upminster is a suburb in East London, England, located 16.5 miles (26.6 km) northeast of Charing Cross. Part of the London Borough of Havering, it is one of the locally important district centres identified in the London Plan. It comprises a number of shopping streets and a large residential area. It was historically a rural village and formed an ancient parish in the county of Essex. Upminster was first connected to central London by rail in 1885 and has a terminal station on the London Underground network. The economic history of Upminster is characterised by a shift from farming to brick making and garden suburb. As part of the suburban growth of London in the 20th century, Upminster significantly expanded and increased in population, becoming part of Hornchurch Urban District in 1934, and has formed part of Greater London since 1965.

== History ==
=== Toponymy ===
Upminster (parish) population
| 1881 | 1,202 |
| 1891 | 1,409 |
| 1901 | 1,477 |
| 1911 | 2,468 |
| 1921 | 3,559 |
| 1931 | 5,732 |
| 1941 | war # |
| 1951 | 13,038 |
# no census was held due to war
source: UK census

The placename Upminster is first recorded in 1062 as Upmynstre and is recorded in the 1086 Domesday Book as Upmunstra. It is formed from Old English upp and mynster, meaning 'the large church on high ground'. The high ground of St Laurence's parish church being in relation to the valley of the River Ingrebourne and the Upminster Bridge over the river shares the name. An alternative explanation suggests the upp could refer to the geographical relationship to a church at Barking or Tilbury in Anglo-Saxon times.

=== Economic development ===
There was a Roman farmstead in the Upminster area from the 1st century to the 3rd century, and agriculture was the predominant industry throughout the following centuries.

The area was once wooded, but clearances in the 12th century gave more land over to arable farming; and by the 17th century there were a variety of crops and livestock. There was a growth in market gardening in the 19th century. There have been a number of windmills in Upminster and one of which, a smock mill built in 1803, remains. Local industry included a tannery, gravel extraction and a brick works that was connected to the railway station by a tramway in 1895.

The London, Tilbury and Southend Railway from Fenchurch Street was extended from Barking to Upminster in 1885. The underground Whitechapel and Bow Railway opened in 1902 and allowed through services of the District Railway to operate to Upminster. The District converted to electric trains in 1905 and services were cut back to East Ham. Delayed by World War I, electrified tracks were extended by the London, Midland and Scottish Railway to Upminster and through services resumed in 1932.

=== Local government ===
Upminster civil parish boundaries before being absorbed into Hornchurch Urban District in 1934

Upminster formed an ancient parish of 3,369 acres (1,363 ha) in the Chafford hundred of Essex. The parish vestry had meetings in the church until 1798, when they moved to the Bell Inn. The parish was divided into North and South wards by the Hornchurch to Cranham road. In 1836 the vestry lost control of poor relief, with Upminster becoming part of the Romford Poor Law Union and in 1875 the parish became part of Romford rural sanitary district. Following the Local Government Act 1894, the sanitary district became Romford Rural District and a parish council was formed of nine members, increasing to twelve by 1913 as the population had doubled. The parish council acquired the Clock House building on St Mary's Lane for use as offices in 1924. The parish formed part of the London Traffic Area from 1924 and the London Passenger Transport Area from 1933. In 1934 the parish council was abolished and Upminster was combined with other parishes to form part of Hornchurch Urban District. On 1 April 1965 Upminster parish and the urban district was abolished and its former area was combined with that of Municipal Borough of Romford; and since then has formed part of the London Borough of Havering in Greater London. At the 1951 census (one of the last before the abolition of the parish), Upminster had a population of 13,038. For elections to the Greater London Council, Upminster was part of the Havering electoral division until 1973 and then the Upminster electoral division until 1986.

=== Urban development ===
The parish had three early centres of activity; the village around the church and the settlements of Hacton and Corbets Tey. The estates of Gaynes, New Place and Upminster Hall were purchased during the 17th century by merchants in the City of London. This caused a significant number of buildings in the town to be constructed or improved. Upkeep of the three bridges crossing the Ingrebourne were the responsibility of Upminster, as the adjacent Hornchurch parish was in the Havering liberty and was exempt from responsibility because of its charter. Although the opening of the station was key to the development of the suburb, land was not purchased for development until 10 acres (4.0 ha) were secured in 1901.

Electricity was introduced in Upminster in 1926. Gas main supply came from Romford in 1872 and from 1905 there was gas street lighting. The area was served by good spring water, with mains supply provided by the South Essex Waterworks Company from 1836. Works on the sewerage system began in 1899 in Upminster village and Corbets Tey. In 1922 sewage works for Upminster and Cranham were opened in Great Warley. Land for Upminster Park was purchased by the parish council in 1929.

== Governance ==
Hornchurch and Upminster constituency in Greater London

The town forms part of the Hornchurch and Upminster UK Parliament constituency, and is covered by the Havering wards of Upminster and Cranham. The current MP is Julia Lopez (formerly Dockerill). Each ward elects three councillors to Havering London Borough Council. All six councillors elected in 2010 for the two wards were the Upminster and Cranham Residents' Association candidates and the area is unusual in that the residents' association is strongly active. From 1945 to 1974 Upminster formed part of the Hornchurch constituency and from 1974 to 2010 it formed part of the Upminster constituency. Upminster is within the Havering and Redbridge London Assembly constituency.

== Geography ==
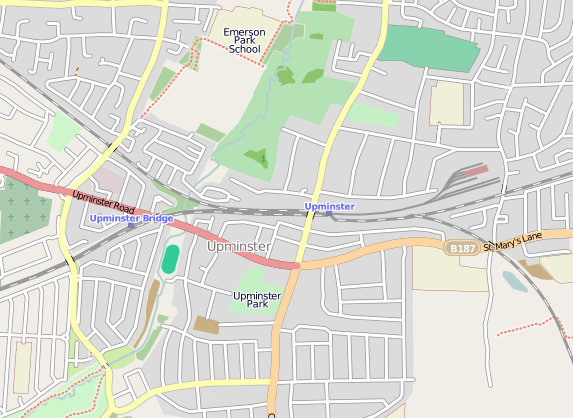
Map of Upminster and environs

Upminster rises to about 200 feet (61 m) above sea level to the north and is about 50 feet (15 m) above sea level to the south. It rests on a layer of loam, above sand and gravel in the south and London Clay to the north. It is bounded in the west by the River Ingrebourne and there is a stream running east–west, just north of Corbets Tey that has been dammed to form a lake. It has formed part of the continuously built-up area of London since the 1930s and is contiguous with Cranham to the east and Hornchurch to the west. To the north and south there is open land that forms part of the Metropolitan Green Belt and there are open spaces formed by Upminster Golf Club and Upminster Hall Playing Field to the north, Upminster Park and Clock House Gardens to the south, and the Ingrebourne Valley linear park to the south west. The town is effectively divided into north and south parts by the railway line. The north is predominantly residential, with the southern part containing the main shopping area. Further south it becomes predominantly residential again. Upminster is a post town in the RM postcode area; it forms a long protrusion over the M25 motorway and additionally includes North Ockendon, also in Havering, and Bulphan in Thurrock.

== Demography ==
Upminster compared (2001 Census)
| Statistic | Upminster | Cranham | Havering | London | England |
Ethnic group
| White | 12,354 | 11,930 | 213,421 | 5,103,203 | 44,679,361 |
| Asian | 133 | 120 | 4,088 | 866,693 | 2,248,289 |
| Black | 59 | 64 | 3,139 | 782,849 | 1,132,508 |
| Mixed | 87 | 78 | 2,298 | 226,111 | 643,373 |
| Chinese/Other | 41 | 19 | 827 | 70,928 | 231,424 |
Population
| Total | 12,674 | 12,242 | 224,248 | 7,172,091 | 49,138,831 |
| Density(/hectare) | 5.62 | 18.67 | 19.97 | 45.62 | 3.77 |
| Households | 4,946 | 5,111 | 91,722 | 3,015,997 | 20,451,427 |

The Havering committee area for Upminster is defined as the wards of Upminster and Cranham. Demographic data is produced by the Office for National Statistics for these wards. All of Upminster is contained within these wards, however they also cover the connected settlement of Cranham and the rural outlier of North Ockendon. In 2001 the population of Upminster ward was 12,674 and Cranham ward was 12,242, giving a total population of 25,098. 80.95% in Upminster and 81.73% in Cranham report their religion as Christian, compared to 76.13% for Havering, 58.23% in London and 71.74% in England. 10.08% in Upminster and 10.46% in Cranham report having no religion, compared to 13.18% in Havering, 15.76% in London and 14.59% in England. With a black and minority ethnic population of 3% in 2001, Cranham and Upminster wards have the lowest Simpson index for ethnic diversity in London. The level of home ownership is atypically high compared to the rest of London and England, with over 90% of housing tenure under owner-occupation in both wards. The Upminster ward has one of the lowest levels of deprivation in London.

The 2011 census showed that the population was 96% white (92% British, 2% Other, 2% Irish). Indian, Chinese and Black African were 1% each. 75% of the population is Christian, the highest recorded in London.

Upminster ethnicity %
| Upminster Ethnicity | Pop 2001 | Pop 2011 | Pop 2021 | % 2001 | % 2011 | % 2021 |
|---|---|---|---|---|---|---|
| White British & Irish | 12201 | 11989 | 11399 | 95.4% | 93.4% | 87.4% |
| White Other | 153 | 224 | 614 | 1.2% | 1.7% | 3.3% |
| Asian | 133 | 295 | 522 | 1% | 2.3% | 3.9% |
| Mixed/Multiple Ethnic Groups | 87 | 162 | 350 | 0.7% | 1.3% | 2.6% |
| Black | 59 | 126 | 242 | 0.5% | 1.0% | 1.8% |
| Other/Arab/Chinese | 41 | 37 | 114 | 0.3% | 0.3% | 0.8% |
| Total White | 12,354 | 12,213 | 12,121 | 97.5% | 95.2 | 90.8% |
| Ethnic Minority | 320 | 620 | 1228 | 2.5% | 4.8% | 9.2% |
| Total Population | 12,674 | 12,833 | 13,348 | 100% | 100% | 100% |

The Asian ethnic/racial group in the United Kingdom census refers only to people of a South Asian background.

== Economy ==
Upminster is identified in the London Plan as a local district centre with 37,000 square metres (400,000 sq ft) of commercial floorspace. It is not considered a significant commercial office location. Within Havering, it is identified as one of seven town centres in the borough, with a retail area extending along Station Road, St Mary's Lane and Corbets Tey Road. The unit sizes are mostly small with the largest outlets the Roomes Fashion and Home department store, the Roomes Furniture and Interiors furniture store, and the Aldi, M&S Simply Food and Waitrose supermarkets.

== Transport ==
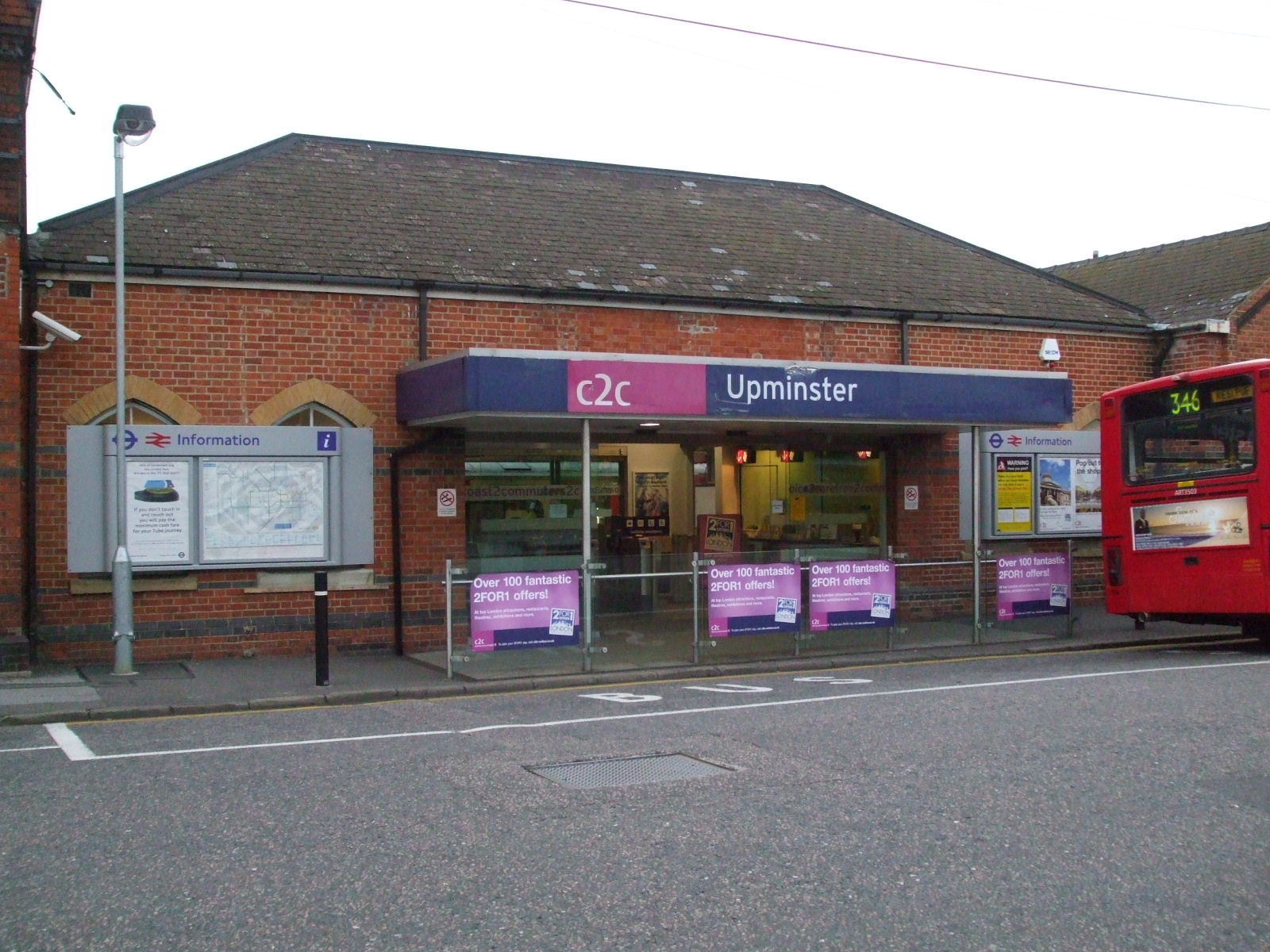
Upminster railway station southern entrance. There is another to the west.

The town is served by Upminster railway station on the London, Tilbury & Southend line and the London Underground, in London fare zone 6. The western part of the town is also served by Upminster Bridge tube station. Upminster and Upminster Bridge are on the District line of the London Underground, with services to Richmond, Ealing Broadway and Wimbledon via central London. The station at Upminster is served by c2c who operate services to Fenchurch Street and Shoeburyness. London Overground operate services to Romford via Emerson Park. There are Transport for London bus services to Hornchurch, Romford, North Ockendon, Lakeside Shopping Centre and Cranham. To the south of Upminster is Damyns Hall Aerodrome. The A127 road to the north is the main radial artery to central London, with the A124 road terminating in the town. The M25 motorway is located about 1.5 miles (2.4 km) to the east of the town centre.

== Culture ==
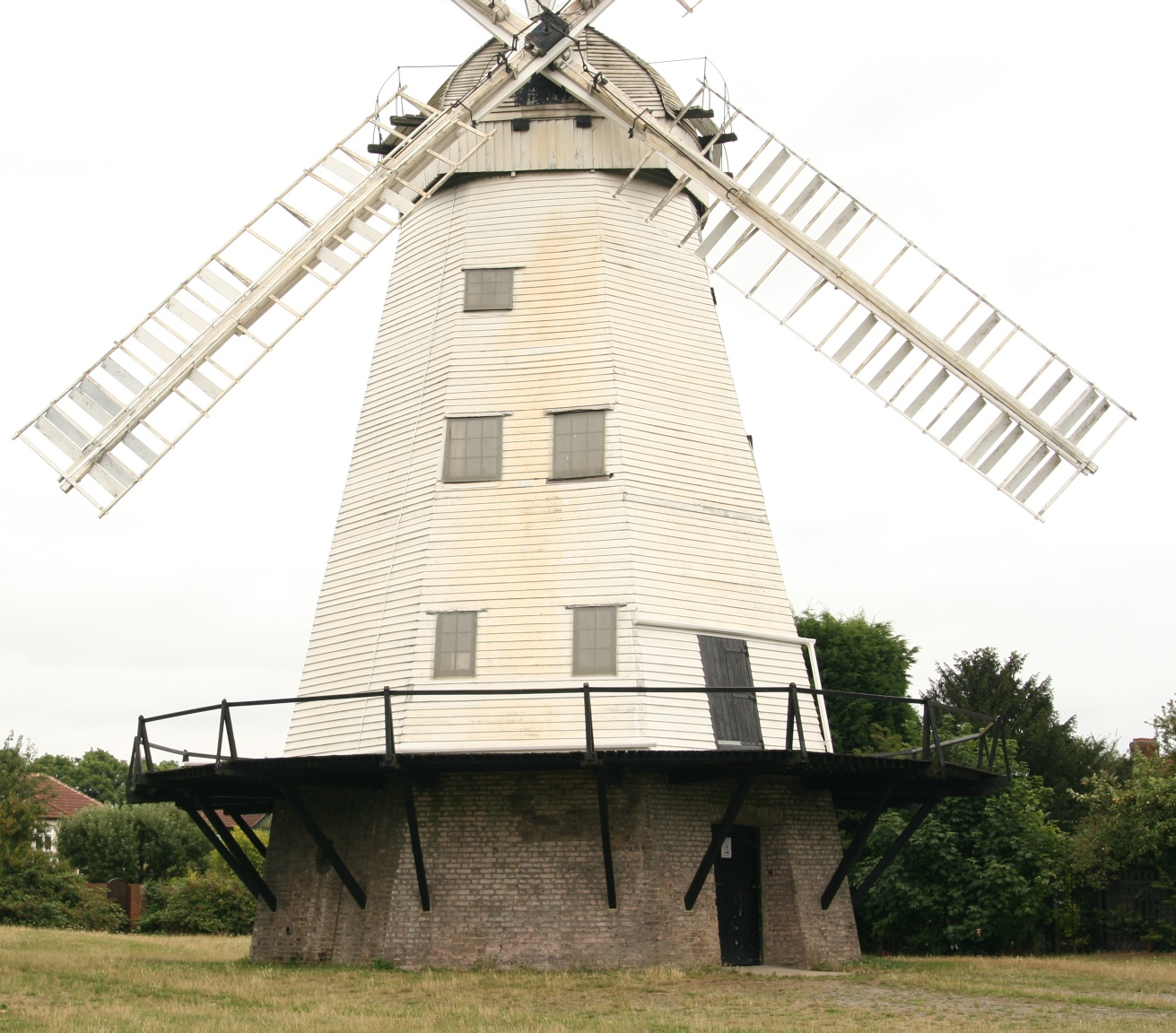
Upminster Windmill is located in a small open space called Windmill Field.

Havering Council's urban strategy recognises that nearby Hornchurch is the main cultural hub of the borough with a large theatre and arts spaces, and Romford offers the largest regional concentration of entertainment facilities. Within Upminster is New Windmill Hall, a flexible entertainment space, built in 1968, which holds up to 300 people. Upminster forms part of the tourism strategy for the borough. It is the location of Upminster Windmill, one of the few remaining mills in Greater London and is Grade II* listed. There is also the Tithe Barn Museum, containing artifacts of domestic and agricultural use. In the west of Upminster is Hornchurch Stadium, which is the home ground of Hornchurch F.C.. Upminster is often associated with Ian Dury and his 1981 album Lord Upminster is named after the town.

=== Speed of sound ===
The speed of sound was first accurately calculated by the Reverend William Derham, Rector of Upminster, thus improving on Sir Isaac Newton's estimates. Derham used a telescope from the tower of the church of St Laurence, Upminster to observe the flash of a distant shotgun being fired, and then measured the time until he heard the gunshot with a half-second pendulum. Measurements were made of gunshots from a number of local landmarks, including the Church of St Mary Magdalene, North Ockendon. The distance was known by triangulation, and thus the speed that the sound had travelled could be calculated.

== See also ==
- List of people from Havering
- List of schools in Havering
