= Barking, Havering and Redbridge University Hospitals NHS Trust =

Healthcare trust in England

- Type: NHS trust
- Established: 5 June 2000
- Headquarters: Romford, London, England
- Hospitals: King George Hospital; Queen's Hospital
- Staff: 7,374 (2019/20)
- Website: www.bhrhospitals.nhs.uk

Barking, Havering and Redbridge University Hospitals NHS Trust is an NHS trust which runs King George Hospital in Goodmayes and Queen's Hospital in Romford. It also operates clinics at a number of sites in the nearby area including Barking Hospital and Brentwood Community Hospital.

== History ==
The trust was established as Barking, Havering and Redbridge Hospitals NHS Trust on 5 June 2000 and became operational on 1 April 2001. It took its current name on 1 February 2009.

== Facilities ==
It has a new Hyper Acute Stroke Unit, a regional centre for neurosurgery, one of the busiest cancer centres in London, and one of the busiest maternity services delivering over 8,000 babies a year. The Trust has a strong infection control record, and slashed the number of MRSA and Clostridioides difficile rates by more than 70% in recent years.

It had an oncology unit, run in partnership with Hospital Corporation of America, with 14 inpatient beds, six chemotherapy chairs, and two consulting rooms established in 2011. The partnership was dissolved in March 2018.

It is implementing System C's Medway patient administration system.

== Performance ==
In October 2013 it was placed in the highest risk category by the Care Quality Commission. In December 2013 it was reported that the trust had paid out more than £23 million for negligence claims in maternity in five years. The CQC report said that while the trust was working hard to make improvements in many areas, it still provided "unsafe care" in A&E and "needs to urgently focus" on resolving these issues because "The A&E departments are at times unsafe because of the lack of full-time consultants and middle-grade doctors." It was placed in special measures on 18 December 2013.

In December 2013 it was placed in special measures by the Care Quality Commission. Inspectors returned to the Trust in March 2015 and highlighted improvement in some areas. The Trust remained in special measures with ongoing challenges around governance and performance. The Trust was re-inspected in October 2016 and came out of special measures in March 2017 - the first Trust in London to do so.

In March 2014 The Trust was forecasting a deficit of £38 million for 2013-4 and a similar figure for 2014-5. In September 2014 the trust revealed a huge, previously unreported waiting list of more than 90,000 patients, 61,143 of which had been waiting past the national 18 week limit. In February 2016 1,015 patients had been waiting more than a year for elective treatment - more than those waiting in the rest of England.

The trust was one of 26 responsible for half of the national growth in patients waiting more than four hours in accident and emergency over the 2014/5 winter. Its performance against the 4-hour standard improved dramatically during 2015-16. While the Trust had been among the worst performers in the country at one point, it became one of the best in London. It hosted a conference in 2015, giving other struggling trusts an insight into the work which had taken place to turn performance around. However, the improvement was short-lived. It spent 10.6% of its total turnover on agency staff in 2014/5. In December 2019 it was the third worst performing trust in England, with only 44.6% seen within 4 hours.

The Trust was one of five to benefit from a five-year, £12.5m programme announced by Jeremy Hunt in July 2015 to bring in Virginia Mason Medical Center to assist English hospitals using their clinical engagement and culture tools including the Patient Safety Alert System and electronic dashboard. Hunt said: "The achievements at Virginia Mason over the past decade are truly inspirational and I'm delighted they will now help NHS staff to learn the lessons that made their hospital one of the safest in the world – patients will see real benefits as a result."

In June 2015 Leigh Day & Co co-ordinated group litigation involving 17 separate families based on the trust's alleged "failure to take reasonable care to ensure that there was a safe system of healthcare provided at [Queen's Hospital]". This included failure to provide sufficient numbers of suitably trained nursing staff and failure to supervise those staff and to ensure adequate records.

In October 2017 it needed a £15 million emergency loan from the Department of Health when external suppliers began threatening legal action over unpaid bills. In 2016-17 it reported that only 25% of non-NHS invoices were paid within 3 months, compared to 59% the previous year. The target is 95%.

As a result of this, the Trust was ultimately placed in Special Measures for Finance, with an increasing deficit significantly above that predicted at the start of the financial year. In September 2018 it was looking for a loan of £100 million from the Department of Health and Social Care which would attract an interest rate of 6% to support an expected in year deficit plan of £53, although in the first four months of 2018, it reported an average monthly deficit of £6 million.

It featured prominently in a report by the Health Service Journal in 2020 on NHS trusts under "enhanced monitoring" by the General Medical Council, because of concerns from junior doctors. Reports included consultants leaving junior doctors with insufficient support.

In 2022 it had the worst A&E performance in England. Only 30%of type one accident and emergency patients were admitted, transferred or discharged within four hours in July.

== Management ==
In the last few years there have been frequent changes to the hospital's Board members. In November 2017, some of the consultant medical staff expressed their lack of confidence in the current leadership, including the former medical director Dr Moghal. A meeting of the senior medical staff committee demanded significant changes to the culture in the organisation. The Chief Executive responded by stating he would start meeting consultants on a quarterly basis. In July 2018 Matthew Hopkins, Chief Executive left the Trust, being replaced by Chris Bown on an interim basis. Dr Moghal, also left the Trust with his short time at the Trust representing his only ever medical director post in the NHS.

An interim Chief Executive was appointed to replace the outgoing CEO in July 2018. Although his salary has not been made public, his last interim NHS CEO salary was around £300,000, paid through a limited company.

- Chair Joe Fielder became Trust chair in November 2017.

== Overseas patients ==
A check on 1,021 women attending maternity at Queen’s hospital in 2017 found that 11 were not entitled to free NHS treatment and each was billed £6,500. The trust issued invoices to patients thought to be ineligible for NHS treatment totalling £2.3 million in 2018-9, but only collected £0.6 million.

== Patient Entertainment ==
The Trust receives hospital radio services from Bedrock Radio, a registered charity founded in 2002 as a merger of Harold Wood Hospital Radio and Oldchurch Hospital Radio.

Bedrock Radio is located at Queen's Hospital in the Cornwall Suite Studios, opened by HRH Duchess of Cornwall, Camilla in 2009.

The charity broadcasts a community health radio service across East London and South Essex.

Patients access hospital radio services using the hospitals NHS Wi-Fi service from WiFi Spark. At Queen's Hospital, Bedrock Radio operate an in-house 'Ward Radio System' that is free to patients, funded by sponsorship and donations. The system reutilises cabling of the defunct patient entertainment provider; Premier Telesolutions (dissolved).

In June 2016 Bedrock Radio took over Goodmayes Hospital Radio Association and began broadcasting to NELFT.

In December 2022 Bedrock Radio replaced Whipps Cross Hospital Radio and began broadcasting to Barts Health Trust.

Bedrock Radio started broadcasting on DAB+ Digital Radio on the North East London, South West Essex Multiplex on 31 December 2025, Awarded a Community Digital Radio licence (C-DSP) by regulator Ofcom.

== See also ==
- List of NHS trusts
