= Harold Wood =

Suburban neighbourhood in Havering, east London

Coordinates: 51.5920°N 0.2313°E

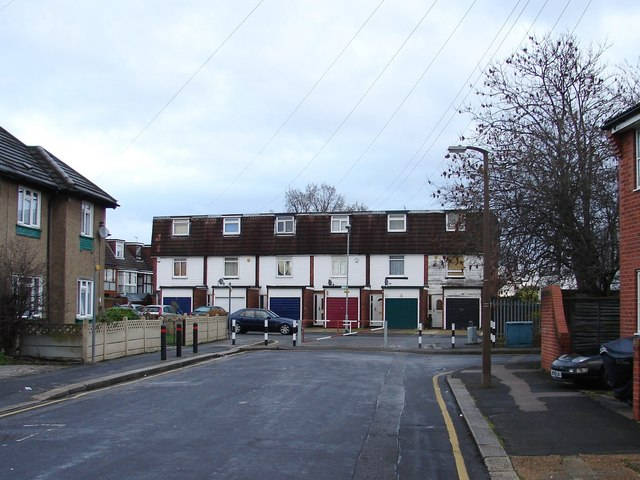
- Terraced housing at Queens Park Road

- Location within Greater London
- Population: 12,650 (Harold Wood ward 2011)
- OS grid reference: TQ545905
  - Charing Cross: 16.5 mi (26.6 km) WSW
- London borough: Havering
- Ceremonial county: Greater London
- Region: London
- Country: England
- Sovereign state: United Kingdom
- Post town: ROMFORD
- Postcode district: RM3
- Dialling code: 01708
- Police: Metropolitan
- Fire: London
- Ambulance: London
- UK Parliament: Hornchurch and Upminster
- London Assembly: Havering and Redbridge

Harold Wood is a suburban neighbourhood in East London in the London Borough of Havering. It is situated 16.5 miles (26.6 km) east-northeast of Charing Cross. Harold Wood was part of the ancient parish of Hornchurch, which became the Liberty of Havering. Most of the current area of Harold Wood became part of Hornchurch Urban District in 1926. It is near to the Greater London boundary with Essex.

== History ==
=== Toponymy ===
The name Harold Wood was recorded in about 1237, when it was shown as Horalds Wood. It was named after King Harold Godwinson, who was defeated by William the Conqueror in 1066. He held the surrounding manor of Havering-atte-Bower. Some of the original roads are named after Anglo-Saxon kings such as Æthelstan and Alfred the Great.

=== Local government ===
Harold Wood formed a ward in the ancient parish of Hornchurch, although the area now around the station was in the North End ward. The eastern and southern boundary of the parish was the River Ingrebourne such that the area around Harold Court was in the parish of Upminster. Although locally situated within Essex the ancient Hornchurch parish formed the independent Liberty of Havering and was outside county administration. Harold Wood ward came under the control of the vestry of Romford chapelry, which also included Collier Row and Noak Hill, however most of the current area of Harold Wood was in the North End ward which remained under Hornchurch parish vestry. In 1836 Romford and Hornchurch became separate civil parishes and were grouped into the Romford Poor Law Union. The area of the union, excluding the town of Romford, became a rural sanitary district in 1875. The special status of the Liberty of Havering was abolished in 1892 and the area was reincorporated into Essex.

Following the Local Government Act 1894, the Romford parish was split with the northern part of the Harold Wood ward becoming a new parish of Noak Hill and the southern part forming part of the Romford Rural parish, both within the Romford Rural District. This split the administration of the area between the Hornchurch, Romford Rural, Noak Hill and Upminster parish councils, and the Romford Rural District Council. In 1900 the Romford Rural parish was recombined with Romford Urban (which consisted of the town of Romford) to form an expanded Romford Urban District. With suburban house building, the population in the area started to rise soon after which prompted changes to the local government system. Hornchurch parish became the Hornchurch Urban District in 1926 and Upminster was added to it in 1934. The area formed part of the London Traffic Area from 1924 and the London Passenger Transport Area from 1933. The whole area was included in the London Borough of Havering in 1965 when it was transferred from Essex to Greater London.

=== Urban development ===
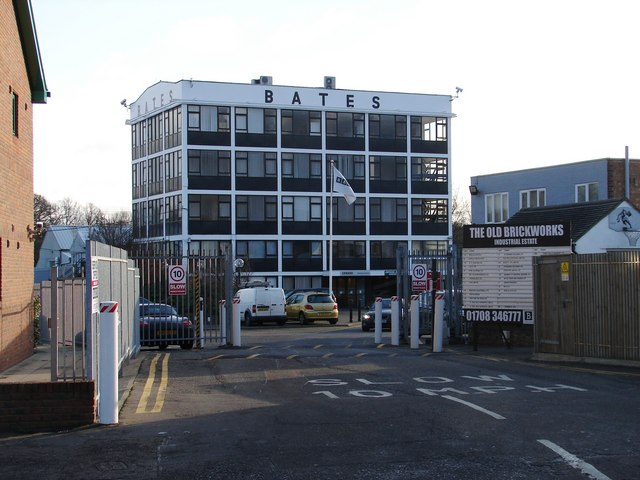
The Old Brickworks industrial estate

Harold Wood Hospital, on Gubbins Lane, closed on 13 December 2006 with all patients moved to Queen's Hospital in nearby Romford. The site vacated by the hospital was earmarked for a 470-home housing development which faced fierce opposition from the local population. As of February 2023, the Kings Park estate has been completed.

== Education ==
There are three schools in Harold Wood:

- Secondary - Redden Court School
- Primary - Harold Wood Primary School and Harold Court Primary School

== Geography ==
Harold Wood borders with the following places:

- Ardleigh Green
- Gidea Park
- Harold Park
- Harold Hill
- Hornchurch
- Brentwood

== Demography ==
86% of the population is White British, as of the 2011 census.

== Transport ==
=== Buses ===
Harold Wood is served by several London Buses routes:

- Daily routes include 256, 294, 346, 496, 498 and 499
- School routes 646, 656 and 608

=== Railway ===
Harold Wood railway station is situated on the Great Eastern Main Line. It is served by Elizabeth line trains running between Shenfield and Paddington via Whitechapel, Liverpool Street, Farringdon and Tottenham Court Road. The nearest tube stations to Harold Wood are Upminster Bridge and Hornchurch, both on the District line.

=== Roads ===
The M25 motorway runs along the easterly boundary and the A12 and A127 roads form the north-west and south-west borders respectively.
