= Upminster Bridge =

Coordinates: 51.5577°N 0.2397°E

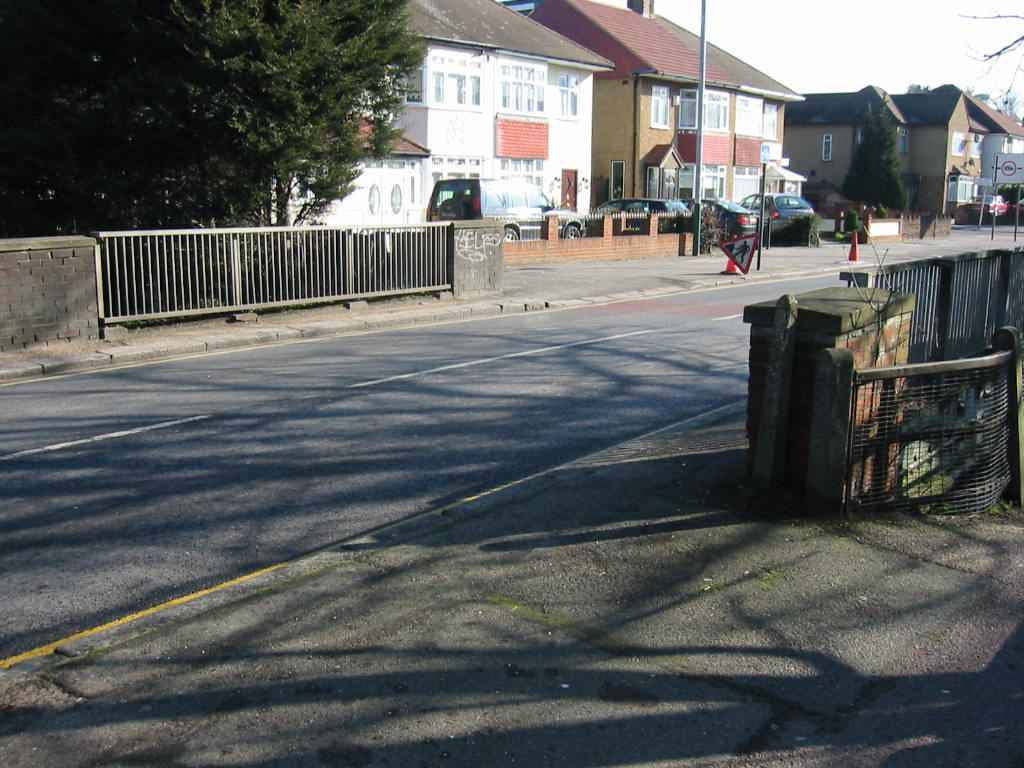
- Upminster Bridge over the Ingrebourne

- Location within Greater London
- OS grid reference: TQ552867
- London borough: Havering
- Ceremonial county: Greater London
- Region: London
- Country: England
- Sovereign state: United Kingdom
- Post town: HORNCHURCH
- Postcode district: RM12
- Post town: UPMINSTER
- Postcode district: RM14
- Dialling code: 01708
- Police: Metropolitan
- Fire: London
- Ambulance: London
- UK Parliament: Hornchurch and Upminster
- London Assembly: Havering and Redbridge

Upminster Bridge is a crossing of the River Ingrebourne carrying the A124 road between the suburbs of Hornchurch and Upminster in northeast London, England. The bridge is known to have existed since at least 1375 and the current brick bridge was opened in 1892, replacing a series of wooden bridges. It gave its name to the nearby Upminster Bridge tube station, which opened in 1934, and has also been applied to the neighbourhood around the station in the London Borough of Havering.

== Etymology ==
The bridge has been alternatively known as Bridge House Bridge and Lower Bridge, with Bridge House referring to a house which stood nearby on the current site of Hornchurch Stadium. The placename Upminster is first recorded in 1062 as Upmynstre and is recorded in the 1086 Domesday Book. It is formed from Old English upp and mynster, possibly meaning the large church on high ground, above the valley of the Ingrebourne. However, it may also indicate the position of an Anglo-Saxon minster secondary to those at Barking or Tilbury.

== History ==
The bridge has existed since at least 1375. It is recorded in 1617 as being in need of repair. The River Ingrebourne formed the boundary between the ancient parishes of Hornchurch and Upminster. However, upkeep of all bridges over the river were the responsibility of the Upminster parish authorities, as Hornchurch claimed exception due to the charter of the Royal Liberty of Havering. The wooden bridge was destroyed and replaced with another after the winter of 1709/10. Replacement wooden carriage bridges were constructed in 1759 and 1827 and an adjacent ford was in use up until the 19th century. A stone and brick structure was completed in 1892 and contains a time capsule.

The significance of the boundary was reduced in 1934 when both sides became part of Hornchurch Urban District. Upminster Bridge tube station opened in 1934. Until its last replacement with railings in the 1980s by Havering London Borough Council, the bridge used to have two low height cast-iron plated bridge sides that were cast by the Whitechapel Bell Foundry, makers of Big Ben and other bells in the Houses of Parliament. A nearby pub used to bear the name The Bridge House but is now called The Windmill, after a brief period being the Hungry Horse.

== Geography ==
The area is split between the Hornchurch and Upminster post towns. However, the post town boundary does not follow the line of the river, instead deviating from it at Hacton Bridge, following the Fenchurch Street–Southend railway line to Berkeley Close and then realigning to the river at Upminster Golf Course. This causes three streets east of the Ingrebourne to be in the Hornchurch post town and twelve streets west of the river to be in the Upminster post town. The street names Bridge Avenue, Boundary Road, Hornminster Glen and Minster Way allude the nature of the location as a boundary between places.

== Transport ==
It is the location of Upminster Bridge tube station. The area is served by the 193, 248 and 370 bus routes, with services to Cranham, Romford, Upminster and Lakeside. The London Loop key walking route passes through the Upminster Bridge area, and the station forms the end point of section 22 from Harold Wood and the starting point of section 23 to Rainham.

Until 1972, bus routes on the A124 road that crosses the narrow bridge were more numerous. Before 248 was extended from its orbital run around Upminster Park Estate to connect into Romford town centre, the London Transport buses reaching Upminster station were the 193 and the 86. The latter running all the way from Bow and Limehouse the 15 or so miles to Upminster most of the time hugging the course of the A124 road.
