= Hornchurch tube station =

London Underground station

Hornchurch
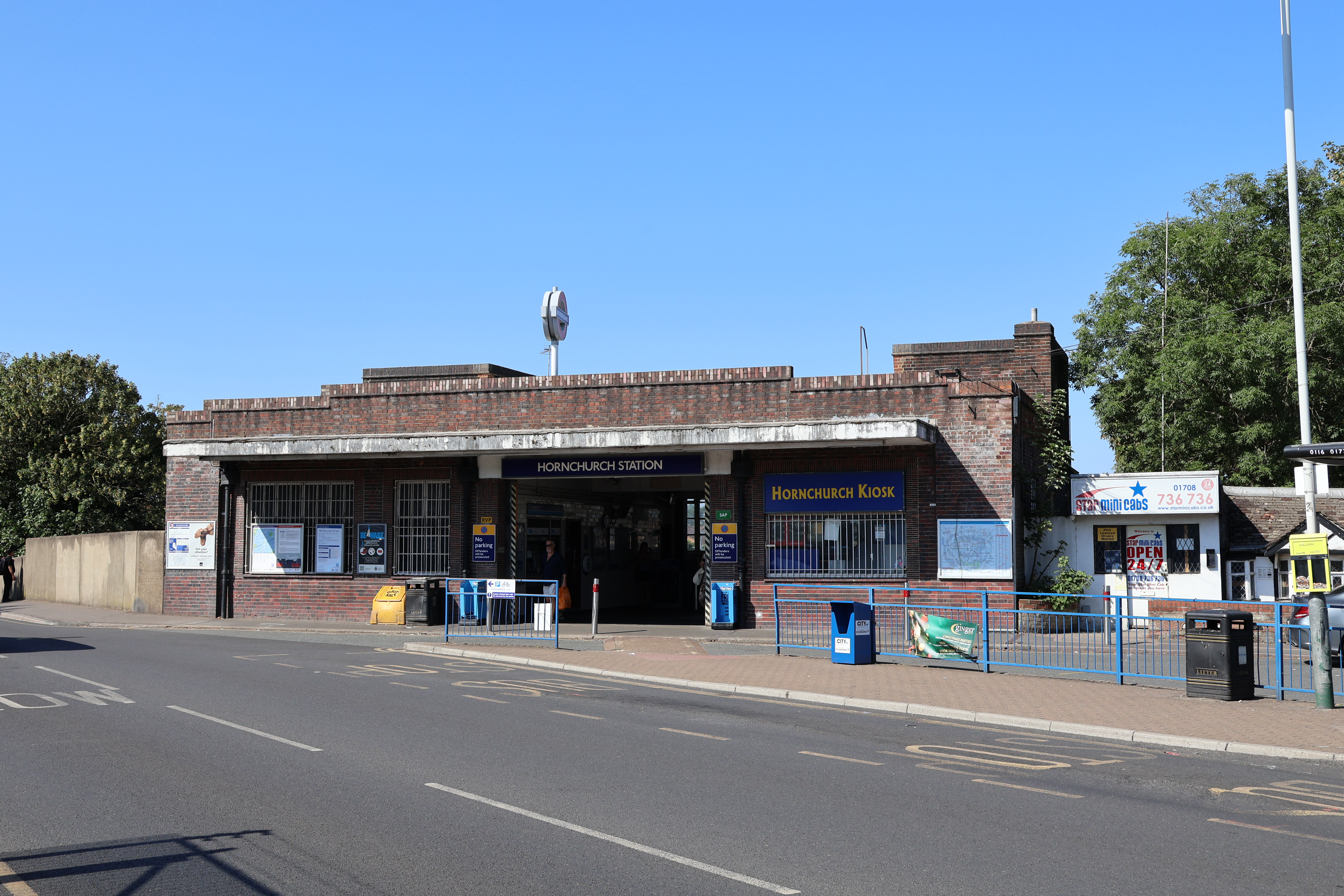
- Entrance on Station Lane

General information
- Location: Hornchurch, Havering
- Coordinates: 51.5539°N 0.2183°E
- Owner: Transport for London
- Manager: London Underground
- Platforms: 2

Other information
- Fare zone: 6
- Website: Official website

History
- Opened: 1 May 1885
- Original company: London, Tilbury and Southend Railway
- Pre-grouping: Midland Railway
- Post-grouping: London, Midland and Scottish Railway

Key dates
- 2 June 1902: District line started
- 30 September 1905: District line withdrawn
- 12 September 1932: District line restarted
- 1 January 1948: Ownership transferred to British Railways
- 14 June 1962: British Railways service withdrawn
- 1 January 1969: Ownership transferred to London Transport

Passengers

London Underground annual entry and exit
- 2021: ▼0.93 million
- 2022: ▲1.47 million
- 2023: ▲1.62 million
- 2024: ▼1.58 million
- 2025: ▲1.67 million
Location
- Location in Havering

Hornchurch is a London Underground station in the town of Hornchurch in the London Borough of Havering, East London. It is on the District line between Elm Park to the west and Upminster Bridge to the east. It is 2.5 kilometres (1.6 mi) along the line from the eastern terminus at Upminster and 22.2 kilometres (13.8 mi) to Tower Hill in central London. The station was opened on 1 May 1885 by the London, Tilbury and Southend Railway on a new direct route from London to Southend that avoided Tilbury. In 1932 the District Railway local service was extended from Barking to Upminster and the station was rebuilt with a new entrance and an additional pair of platforms. The London–Southend service was withdrawn from Hornchurch and the original platforms abandoned in 1962. The single-storey brick building is of a similar design to those constructed at Becontree and Dagenham East. It is in London fare zone 6.

== History ==
The original 1854 route of the London, Tilbury and Southend Railway (LTSR) passed through the south of the parish of Hornchurch near the River Thames without stopping; the nearest station was 5 kilometres (3.1 mi) at Rainham. Between 1885 and 1888 a new route authorised as the Barking and Pitsea Railway was constructed. It provided a direct service from Fenchurch Street to Southend, avoiding Tilbury. The George Hopkins-designed station at Hornchurch opened with the first section of the new line to Upminster on 1 May 1885. Through service to Southend commenced on 1 June 1888. The Whitechapel and Bow Railway opened on 2 June 1902 and allowed through services of the District Railway to operate as far as Upminster. The District converted to electric trains on 30 September 1905 and services were cut back to East Ham. (Note: Electric service was extended to Barking on 1 April 1908.) The LTSR was purchased by the Midland Railway (MR) in 1912. The MR was amalgamated with several other railways to create the London, Midland and Scottish Railway (LMS) on 1 January 1923.

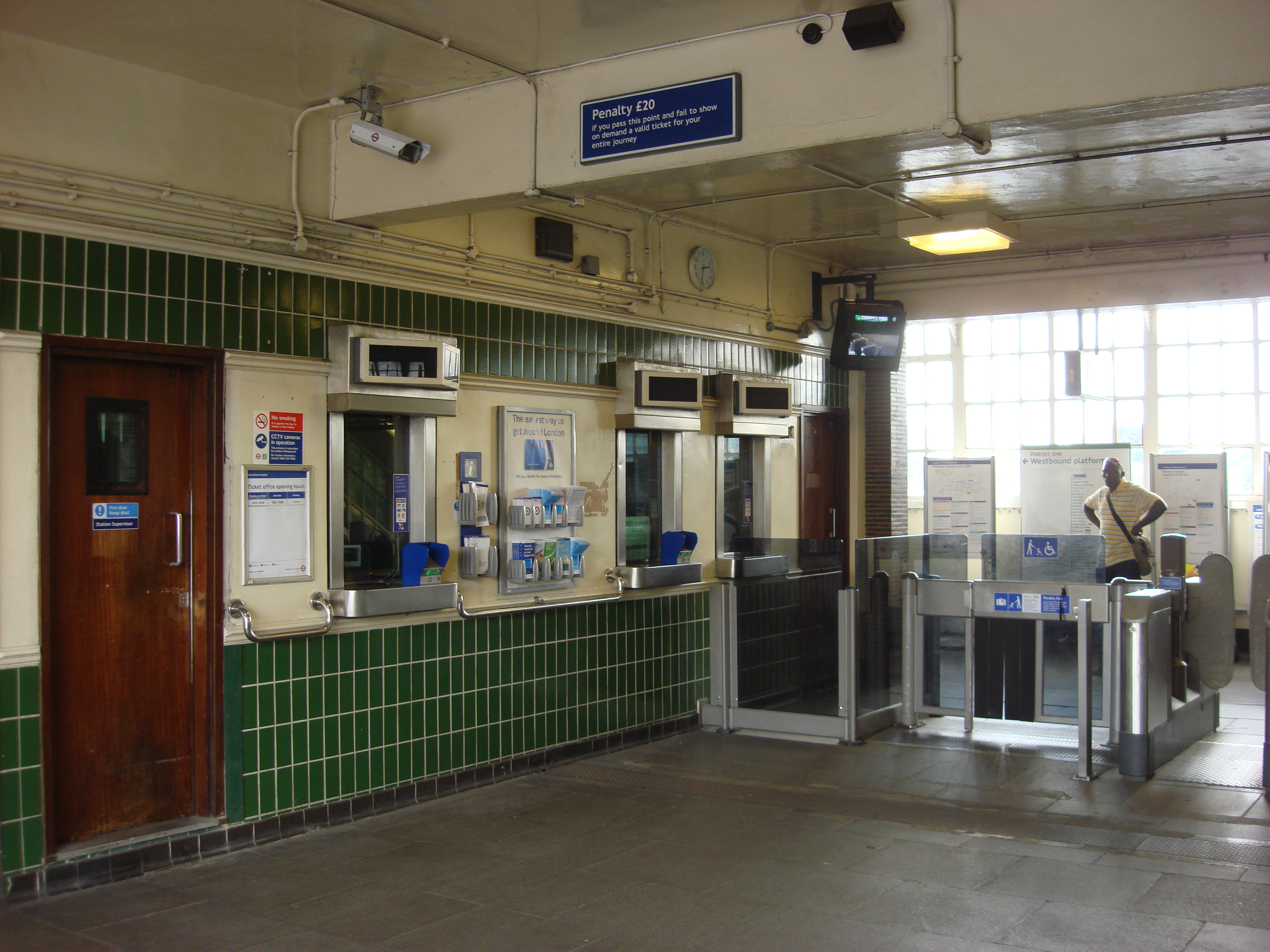
Ticket office in 2008 prior to being decommissioned

Hornchurch was served by regular daily District/LTSR through trains from June 1912 to September 1932, changing from electric District to steam LTSR locomotives at Barking. Delayed by World War I, an additional pair of electrified fourth rail tracks were extended by the London, Midland and Scottish Railway to Upminster and services of the District resumed at Hornchurch in 1932. To coincide with the introduction of electric services, the station was rebuilt with two additional platforms and a new ticket office spanning the tracks facing onto Station Lane. The goods yard was moved from the north to the south of the station to accommodate the new slow lines. The station was built to the designs of LMS architect William Henry Hamlyn, drawing inspiration from London Underground station architecture. Electric train service was initially a train every 10 minutes at peak times and every 20 minutes off-peak.

The District Railway was incorporated into London Transport in 1933, and became known as the District line. A new station at Upminster Bridge became the next station to the east in 1934 and Elm Park was added to the west in 1935. The 1947 timetable shows only a few services a day provided by the London, Midland and Scottish Railway and a frequent service provided by the District.

After nationalisation of the railways in 1948, management of the station passed to British Railways. The remaining Fenchurch Street–Southend services were withdrawn on 14 June 1962 with the introduction of full overhead line electric service. To compensate for the loss of direct trains, Barking station was reconfigured to provide cross-platform interchange between District line and Fenchurch Street services. (Note: Tickets for Fenchurch Street and Tower Hill (previously Mark Lane) have been interchangeable since the introduction of District service.) British Rail continued to manage the station despite providing none of the services and on 1 January 1969 ownership transferred to the London Underground.

== Design ==
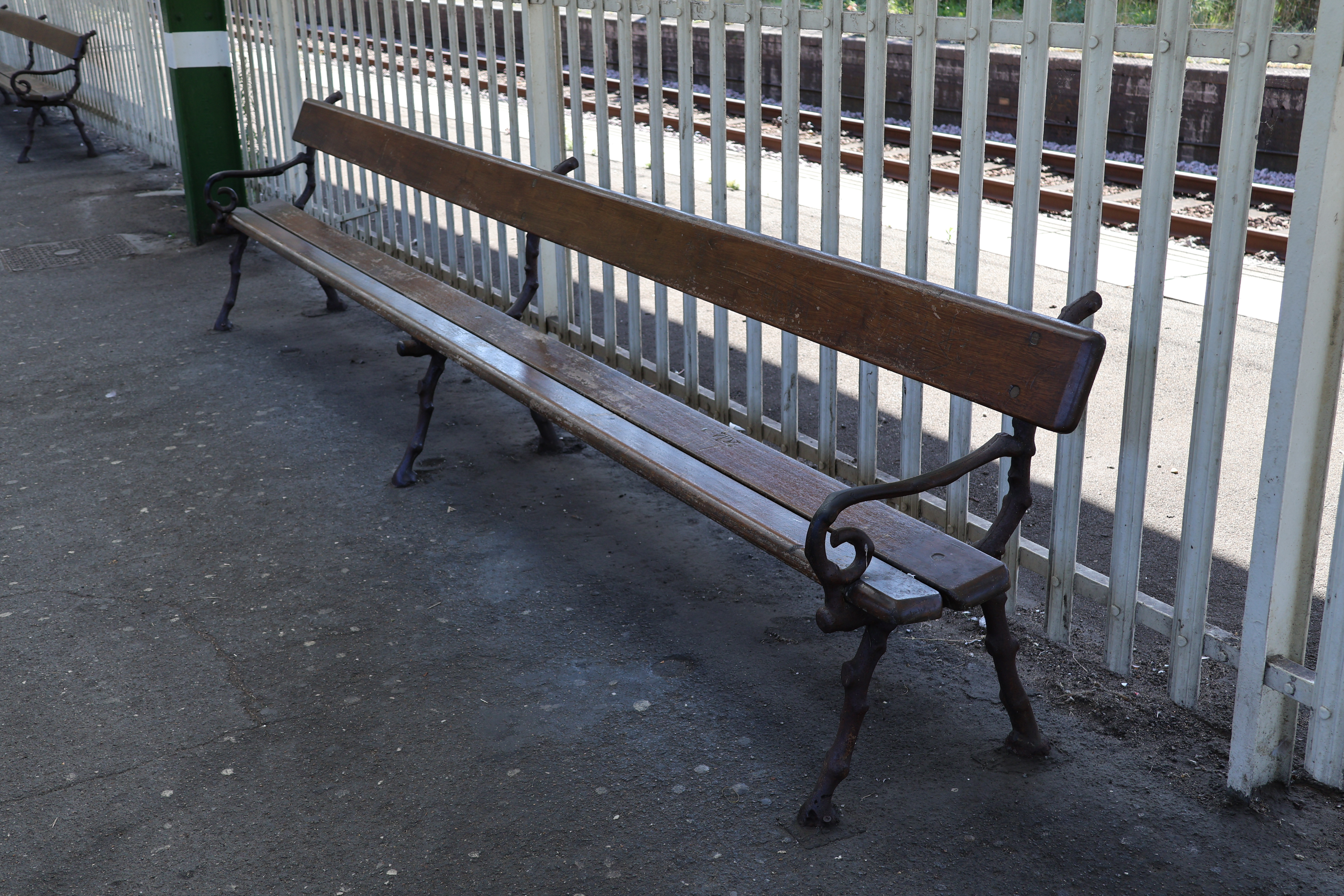
Midland Railway benches are a heritage feature

There is no trace of the 1885 George Hopkins-designed station buildings, but they were similar to those still in existence at West Horndon. (Note: A common design was used at stations between Dagenham and Pitsea and at Ockendon.) Two platforms with short canopies were connected by a footbridge at their eastern end. Initially it was planned to have station buildings on the down platform, but it was decided to provide better access to the station by placing them on the road. (Note: The already completed architectural design was used instead for the Upminster up platform buildings.)

The station consists of two side platforms—numbered 1 for westbound and 2 for eastbound—located either side of the running tracks. There are four tracks through the site, with the operational platforms located on the northern pair. Another pair of tracks to the south are used by London, Tilbury and Southend line outer suburban services and there are disused platforms on those lines. The operational platforms are mostly covered by station canopies with a waiting room and toilets on the westbound platform. The Fletton brick ticket office is located at street level above the platforms, to which it is connected by a covered footbridge stairway. A second peak-hours station exit on the eastbound platform is now disused. The 1930s architecture is similar in design to Becontree and Dagenham East and is contemporaneous with the introduction of electric services. The heritage platform benches are of Midland Railway design.

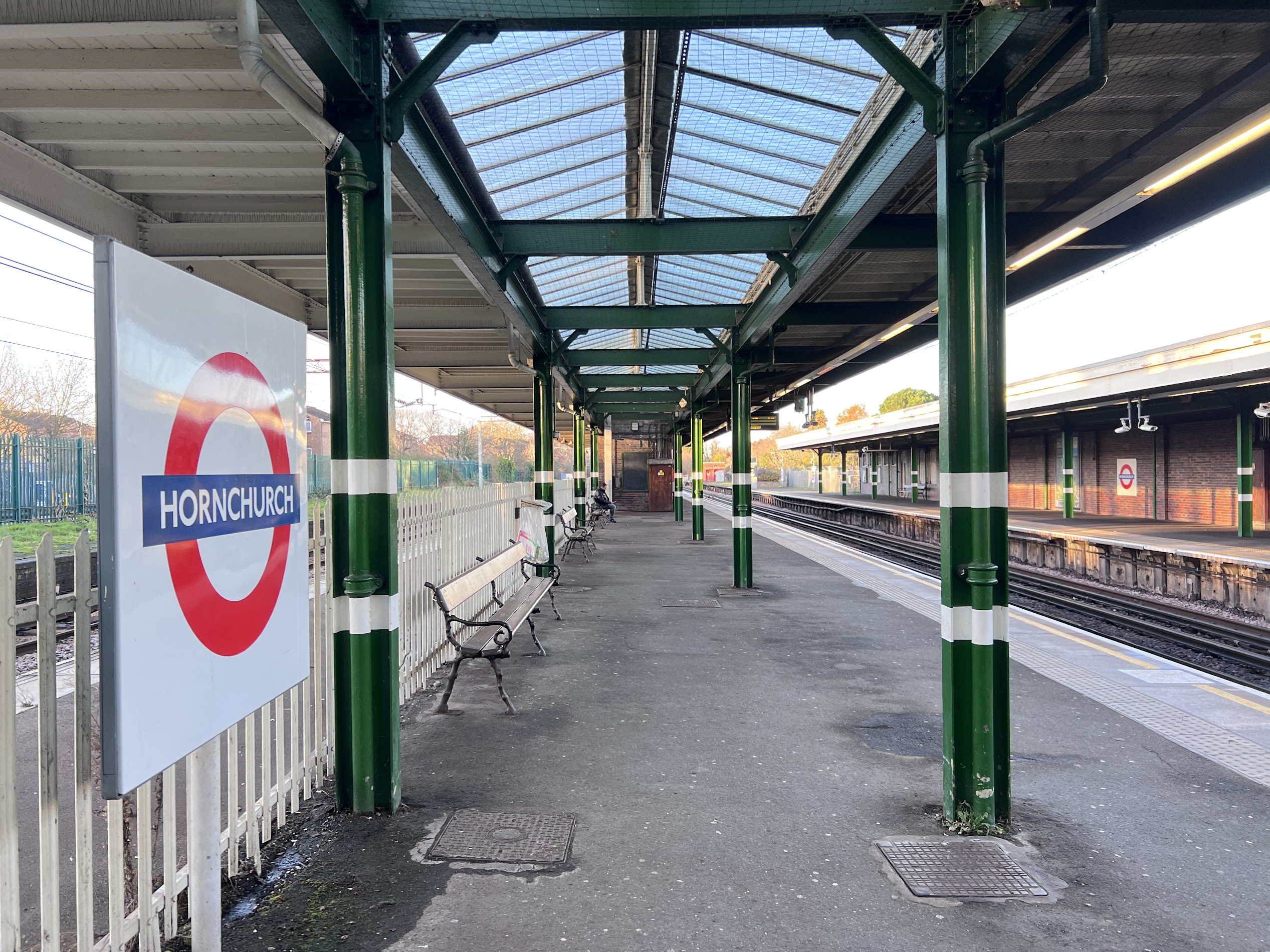
Westbound District line platform (right) forms an island platform with the abandoned eastbound Fenchurch Street line platform

As part of the public–private partnership arrangement for maintenance of the London Underground, the station was due to be refurbished by Metronet. Following the collapse of Metronet, responsibility of station upkeep was transferred to Transport for London in 2008. (Note: Works were planned to include provision of tactile strips and colour contrasted handrails for the visually impaired, installation of closed-circuit television cameras, passenger help points, new electronic departure information displays on the platforms, a new public address system, and improved lighting.) Transport for London has assigned the station to the 'limited works' category and plans to complete these improvements incrementally, according to the need to preserve assets. The station does not have step-free access from the platforms to the street, although there are two out-of-use lift shafts from the platforms to the booking hall. The station was shortlisted for step-free access work in 2025.

== Location ==
Location of the station on part of the District line

The station is located on Station Lane in the London Borough of Havering, approximately 1 mile (1.6 km) south of Hornchurch high street. It is surrounded by a cluster of shops in a primarily residential area, near to St George's Health and Wellbeing Hub and Hornchurch Country Park. A 66 space car park, owned by Transport for London and managed by Saba Park Services UK Limited, is accessed from Naunton Way. It is served by London Buses routes 193, 252, 256 and school route 652, providing connections to Collier Row, County Park Estate, Noak Hill, Queen's Hospital, Romford and St George's Park.

Upminster Bridge station is 1.26 kilometres (0.78 mi) to the east of the station and Elm Park is 1.5 kilometres (0.93 mi) to the west. It is 22.2 kilometres (13.8 mi) along the line from Tower Hill in central London and 2.5 kilometres (1.6 mi) from the eastern terminus at Upminster. The station is 13 miles 56 chains (22.0 km) down the line from Fenchurch Street.

== Services ==
External images
- Exterior of Hornchurch, LMS station, 1935
- Exterior of Hornchurch, British Railways station, 1957

The station is managed by London Underground. It is in London fare zone 6. The typical off-peak service from the station is 12 District line trains per hour to Upminster and 12 to Earl's Court, of which six continue to Ealing Broadway and six continue to Richmond. At peak periods the number of trains per hour increases to 15 and some trains continue from Earl's Court to Wimbledon. Services towards central London operate from approximately 05:00 to 23:45 and services to Upminster operate from approximately 06:00 to 01:30. The journey time to Upminster is approximately four minutes, to Barking 13 minutes and to Tower Hill in central London 36 minutes. With 1.67 million entries and exits in 2024, it was ranked the 233rd busiest London Underground station.

== Notes ==
Preceding station	London Underground	Following station
Elm Park towards Wimbledon, Richmond or Ealing Broadway	District line	Upminster Bridge towards Upminster
Former services
Dagenham East	London, Tilbury and Southend line Eastern Region of British Railways	Upminster
