= Oldchurch Hospital =

- Barking, Havering and Redbridge University Hospitals NHS Trust
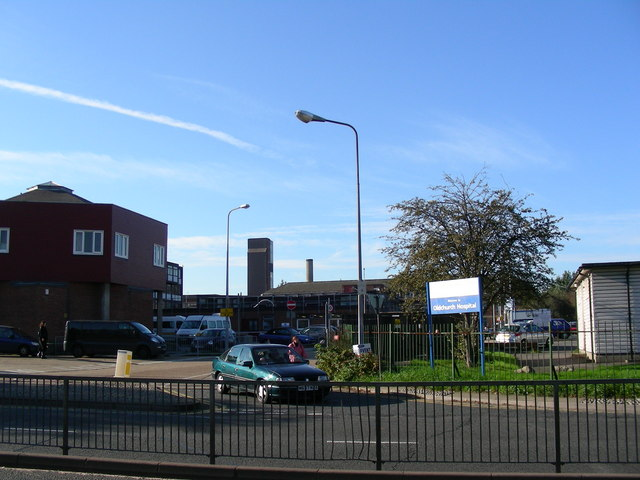
- Oldchurch Hospital

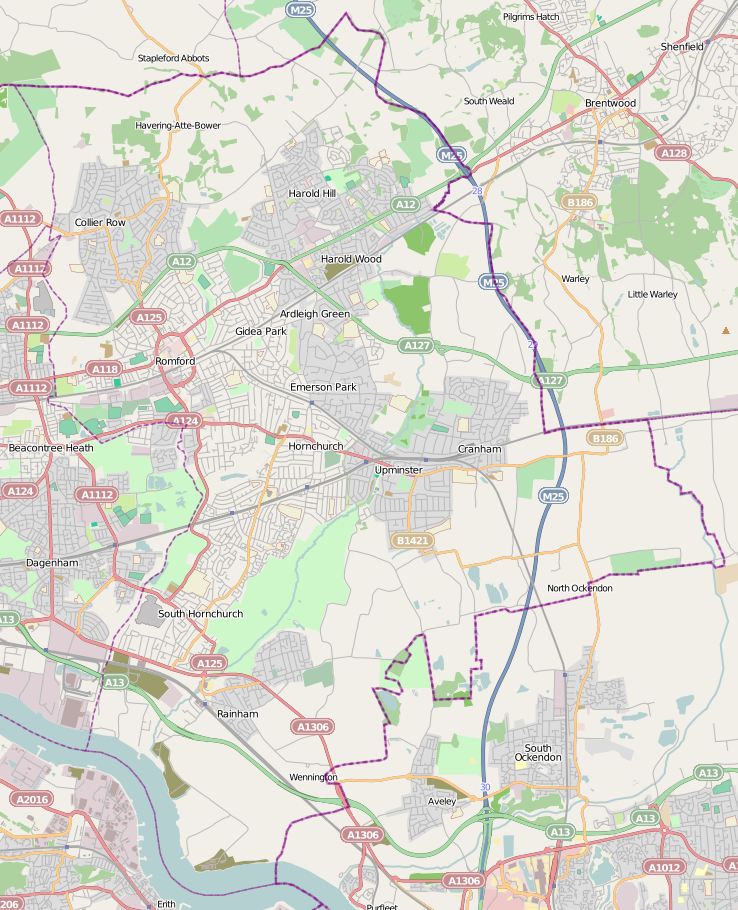
- Shown in Havering

Geography
- Location: Romford, Greater London, England
- Coordinates: 51.5713°N 0.1781°E

Organisation
- Care system: NHS England
- Type: District General

Services
- Emergency department: Yes

History
- Founded: 1893
- Closed: 2006

Oldchurch Hospital was a hospital in Greater London, United Kingdom, located in Romford in the London Borough of Havering and part of the Barking, Havering and Redbridge Hospitals NHS Trust.

== History ==
The hospital has its origins in the infirmary built to support the Romford Union Workhouse in 1893. It served as a military hospital during the First World War and became the Oldchurch County Hospital in 1929. The name refers to Saint Andrew's Chapel, the "old church" of Romford that was replaced by the Church of St Edward the Confessor in 1410.

It joined the National Health Service in 1948. It closed in December 2006 with functions moved to the new, state of the art Queen's Hospital, located nearby and to King George Hospital in Chadwell Heath.

== Hospital radio service ==
Hospital radio services at Oldchurch began in 1985, when volunteers of Radio Rush Green established a link using a landline from the studio at Rush Green Hospital, Dagenham to the patients' bedside radio system at Oldchurch Hospital, Romford. With the link established, Radio Rush Green relaunched as "Hospital Radio 174" (Shortened to Radio 174) on 20 October 1985.

Hospital Radio 174 took its unusual name from the London Transport Bus Route 174 which runs between Rush Green and Oldchurch.

In 1993, Hospital Radio 174 moved from Rush Green Hospital into a new studio located in the Nurses' Home at Oldchurch Hospital. In 1996, Rush Green Hospital closed. The station was granted a low powered AM licence from Ofcom and installed an induction loop AM transmitter system across Oldchurch Hospital broadcasting on 846Khz (AM), with the Hospital Radio 174 re-branding as Oldchurch Radio in October 1996.

In 2000, plans where announced, that a new hospital was to be built in Romford (today known as Queen's Hospital). The Trust requested local hospital radio services in Romford merge in preparation for the new hospital. With Oldchurch Hospital Radio and Harold Wood Hospital Radio amalgamating to create "Bedrock" on 22 June 2002.

Bedrock became a registered charity in October of 2002 retaining studios at Oldchurch Hospital broadcasting on 846AM, with a dedicated landline link to the radio system at Harold Wood Hospital. In 2006, Hospital Radio services where relocated to Queen's Hospital, where the 846 Khz Transmitter was turned off and the link to Harold Wood ceased ahead on the hospital's closure.

In 2024, Bedrock Radio published "60 Years of Hospital Radio" to celebrate the station's heritage.

== Notable births ==
- Gemma Collins (born 1981), media personality and businesswoman

== See also ==
- Healthcare in London
