= Harold Wood Hospital =

Coordinates: 51.5925°N 0.2261°E

- Barking, Havering and Redbridge Hospitals NHS Trust
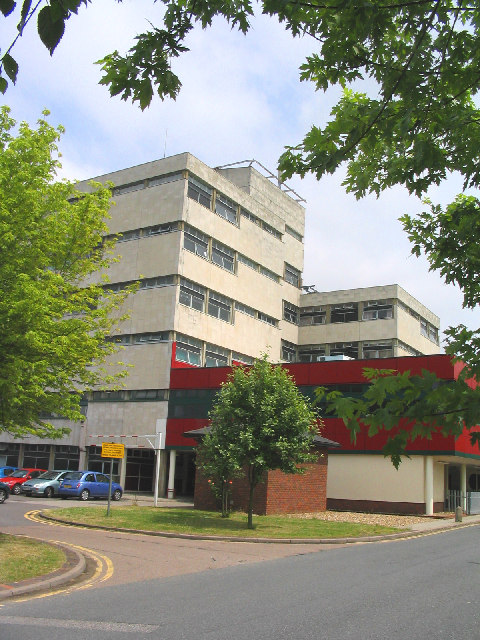
- Harold Wood Hospital in 2005

Geography
- Location: Gubbins Lane, Harold Wood, London, England

Organisation
- Care system: National Health Service
- Type: General

Services
- Emergency department: Yes

History
- Closed: 13 December 2006

Harold Wood Hospital was a hospital in east London, United Kingdom. It was located in Gubbins Lane, in Harold Wood, in the London Borough of Havering. It was managed by Barking, Havering and Redbridge Hospitals NHS Trust. The Havering Campus of London South Bank University and an NHS polyclinic continue to operate with the remainder of the site now a residential development by Countryside Properties known as Kings Park. The former long term conditions centre is now closed and being redeveloped as housing.

== History ==
The hospital was opened in 1909 in the north of the parish of Hornchurch by West Ham County Borough council, as the Grange convalescent home for children, which operated with the nearby Plaistow fever hospital. The Grange had been a private house, built in 1884 by John Compton, owner of the Gubbins estate. The convalescent home was maintained by the county borough until the Second World War, as an emergency hospital. After the war it became a permanent hospital, and in the 1960s was significantly enlarged.

After services relocated to Queen's Hospital and to King George Hospital in Redbridge, the hospital was closed on 13 December 2006. The site vacated by the hospital was earmarked for a 470-home housing development. The original plan to keep certain NHS facilities was superseded and the entire plot was approved for residential development. Local residents opposed the proposal of over 800 dwellings, including a 9-storey block. A residential development by Countryside Properties known as Kings Park was completed in 2018. It is proposed that a block of flats be erected on the site of the former long term conditions centre.

== Hospital Radio ==
Hospital Radio service began at Harold Wood on 14 February 1964, initially starting as "Warley Hospital Radio Service".

The secretary of Harold Wood Hospital gave the radio group a room in the recreation hall, where the service became known as Harold Wood Radio and began providing a radio service to the wards of the Hospital by connecting into the patients' bedside radio amplifiers. In 1971 the radio service became a registered charity.

In 2000, plans were announced, that a new hospital was to be built in Romford (today known as Queen's Hospital). The Trust requested local hospital radio services in Romford merge in preparation for the new hospital, with Harold Wood Hospital Radio and Oldchurch Hospital Radio amalgamating to create "Bedrock" on 22 June 2002.

Bedrock became a registered charity in October 2002.

In 2024, Bedrock Radio published "60 Years of Hospital Radio" to celebrate the station's heritage.

== See also ==
- Healthcare in London
- List of hospitals in England
