= Upminster Bridge tube station =

London Underground station

Upminster Bridge
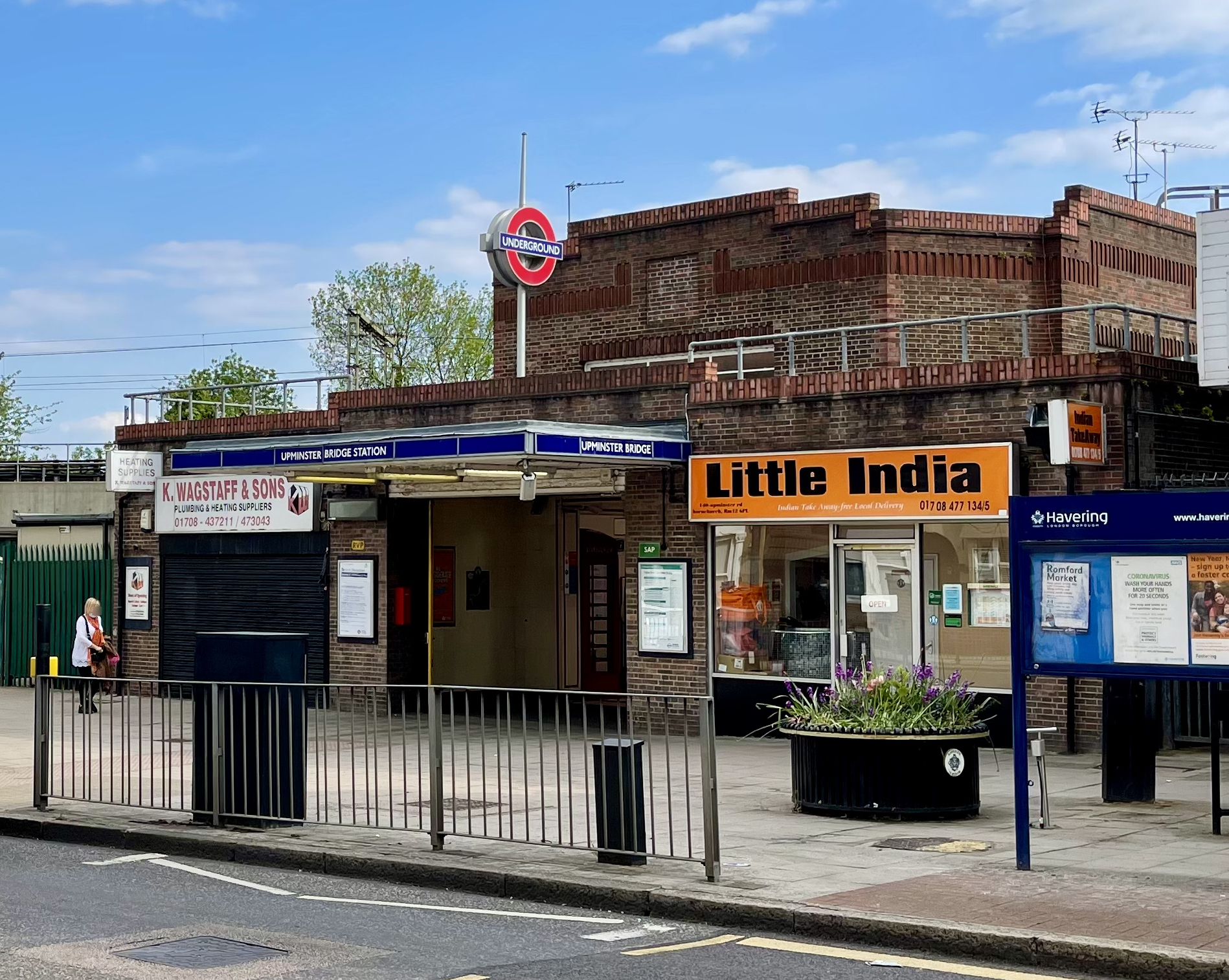
- Entrance on Upminster Road

General information
- Location: Upminster Bridge, Havering
- Coordinates: 51.558°N 0.2341°E
- Owner: Transport for London
- Manager: London Underground
- Platforms: 2

Other information
- Fare zone: 6
- Website: Official website

History
- Opened: 17 December 1934
- Original company: London, Midland and Scottish Railway

Key dates
- 1 January 1948: Ownership transferred to British Railways
- 1 January 1969: Ownership transferred to London Transport

Passengers

London Underground annual entry and exit
- 2021: ▼0.51 million
- 2022: ▲0.74 million
- 2023: ▲0.84 million
- 2024: ▼0.71 million
- 2025: ▲0.83 million
Location
- Location in Havering

Upminster Bridge is a London Underground station in the Upminster Bridge neighbourhood of the London Borough of Havering, East London. It is on the District line, between Hornchurch and Upminster stations. It is 1.2 km (0.75 miles) along the line from the eastern terminus at Upminster and 22 km (14 miles) from Tower Hill in Central London. The station was opened on 17 December 1934 by the London, Midland and Scottish Railway on the local electrified tracks between Upminster and Barking that were constructed in 1932. The main station building, on Upminster Road, is of a distinctive polygonal design by William Henry Hamlyn. It has relatively low usage for a suburban station and was the least busy station on the District line in 2024. It is in London fare zone 6.

== History ==
The London, Tilbury and Southend Railway from London Fenchurch Street and Barking was constructed through the Upminster Bridge area in 1885, with stations at Hornchurch and Upminster. The Whitechapel and Bow Railway opened in 1902 and allowed through-services of the District Railway to operate to Upminster. The District Railway converted to electric trains in 1905 and services were cut back to East Ham. (Note: Electric service was extended to Barking on 1 April 1908.) Delayed by World War I, electrified tracks were extended by the London, Midland and Scottish Railway (LMS) to Upminster and through-services resumed in 1932. The District Railway was incorporated into London Transport in 1933 and became known as the District line.

The new tracks built by the London, Midland and Scottish Railway allowed additional intermediate stations to be constructed on the local lines between 1932 and 1935. Increased local demand was caused by the expansion of the built-up area of suburban London during the interwar period. The infill station at Upminster Bridge was built to the designs of LMS architect William Henry Hamlyn, drawing inspiration from London Underground station architecture. It opened with platforms on the local electric lines on 17 December 1934. The station was operated by the London, Midland and Scottish Railway but was only served by District line trains. (Note: One daily steam service to Fenchurch Street was provided for very early morning workers.) After nationalisation of the railways in 1948 management of the station passed to British Railways. In 1969 ownership transferred to the London Underground.

In 2006, the station became one of the first on the network to operate without a staffed ticket office.

== Design ==
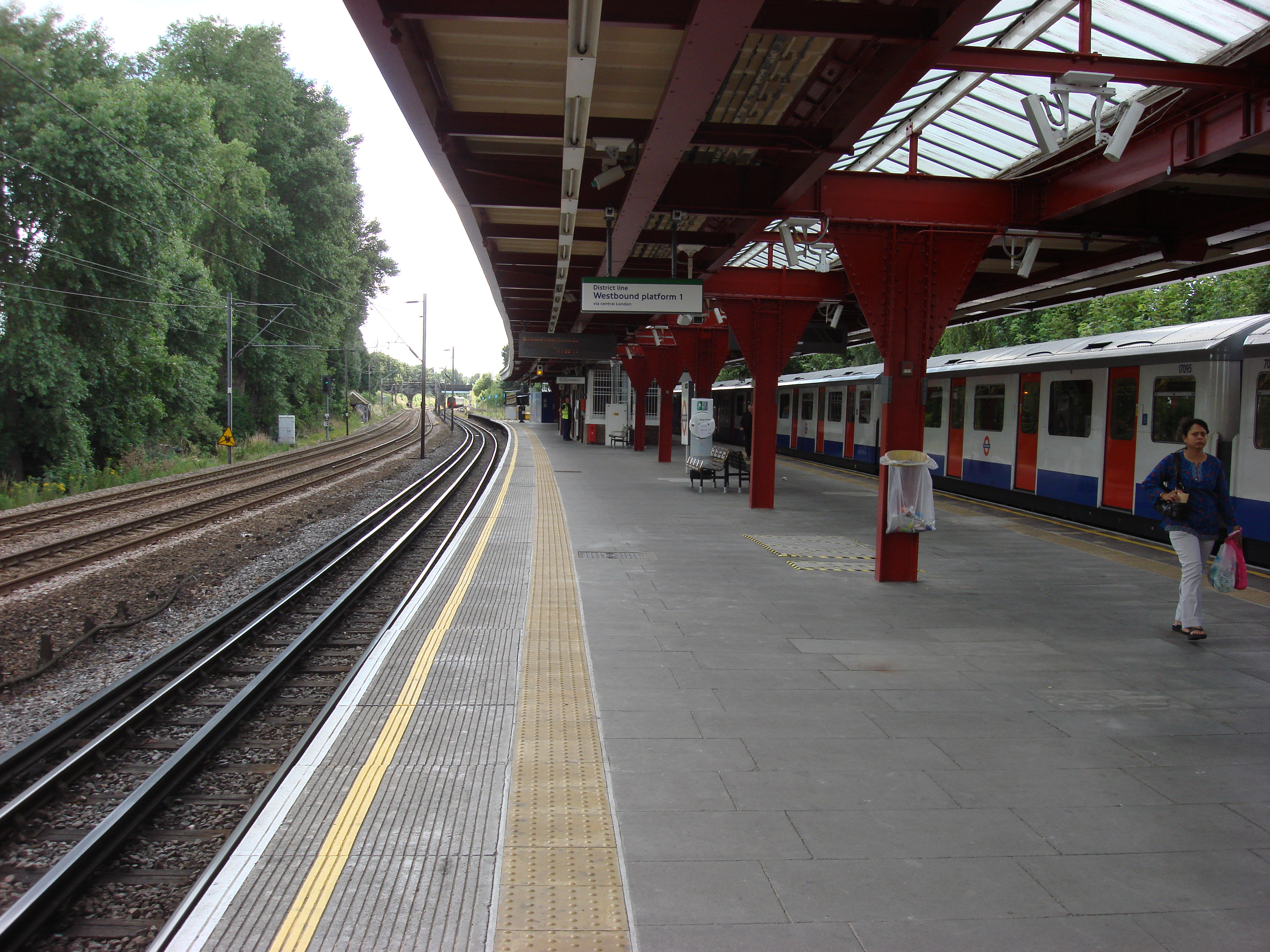
Island platform with an eastbound Upminster train at the platform and the London, Tilbury and Southend line tracks on the left

The station consists of a central island platform—numbered 1 for westbound and 2 for eastbound—between the tracks that are elevated on a railway embankment. There are four tracks through the site although there are no platforms for the London, Tilbury and Southend line. The full length of the platform is covered by a single canopy with a central waiting room and public toilet.

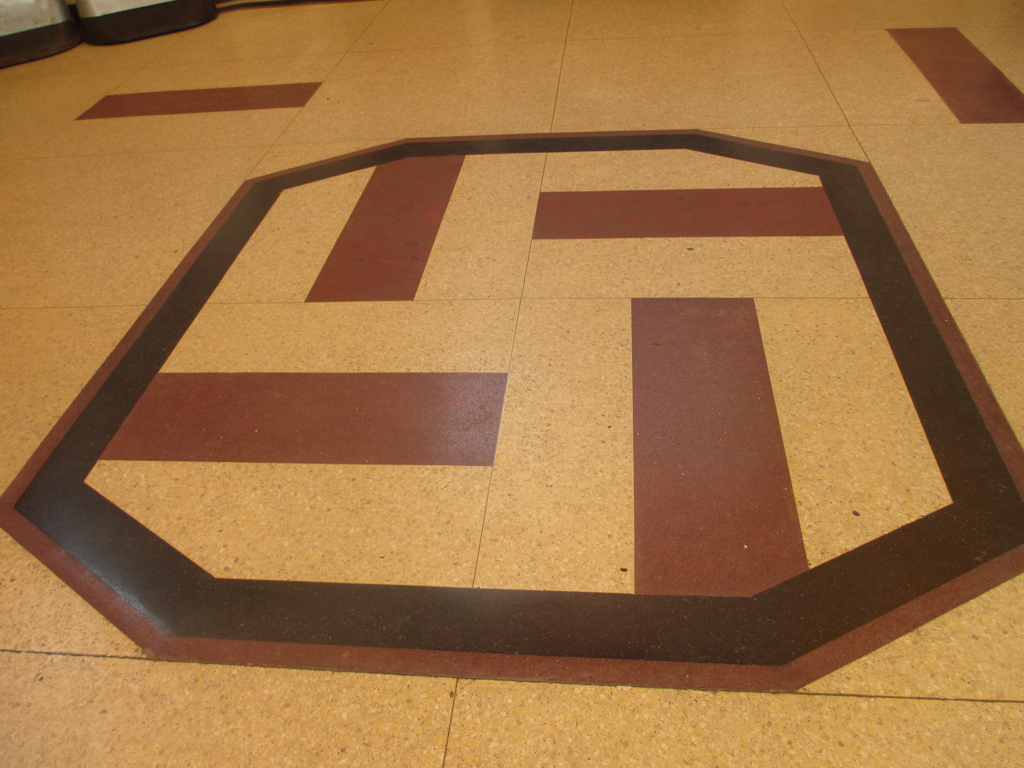
The swastika in the ticket hall

The Art Deco red brick ticket office is located below platform level, to which it is connected by a subway and stairway. Although similar to the other single-storey station buildings on this part of the route, it is notable for its high atrium roof and polygonal shape. The floor is tiled with a reversed swastika pattern, a popular decorative design at the time the station was constructed. The station was listed locally as a building of local heritage interest by Havering London Borough Council.

As part of the public–private partnership arrangement for maintenance of the London Underground, the station was refurbished by Metronet during 2005 and 2006. Works included provision of tactile strips and colour contrasted handrails for the visually impaired, installation of closed-circuit television cameras, passenger help points, new electronic departure information displays on the platforms, a new public address system and improved lighting. The station does not have step-free access from the platforms to the street.

== Location ==
Location of the station on part of the District line

The station is named after a nearby crossing of the River Ingrebourne. The river was the boundary between the ancient parishes of Hornchurch and Upminster and the station is located on the western Hornchurch side. The station is situated on Upminster Road in the London Borough of Havering and is flanked by a parade of shops. It is situated in a primarily residential area and is near to Havering Sixth Form College and Hornchurch Stadium. The station is served by London Buses routes 248 and 370, providing connections to Cranham, Lakeside and Romford.

The London Loop key walking route passes outside the station, and it forms the end point of section 22 from Harold Wood and the starting point of section 23 to Rainham. The station is located on the eastern extremity of the District line and is the penultimate station before the terminus at Upminster. Upminster station is 1.24 kilometres (0.77 mi) to the east of the station and Hornchurch is 1.26 kilometres (0.78 mi) to the west. It is 23.4 kilometres (14.5 mi) along the line from Tower Hill in central London. The station is 14 miles 38 chains (23.3 km) down the line from Fenchurch Street.

== Services ==
External images
- Exterior of Upminster Bridge, British Railways station, 1956
- Exterior of Upminster Bridge, LMS station, 1935

Upminster Bridge station is on the eastern part of the District line in London fare zone 6. It is between Hornchurch to the west and Upminster to the east. The typical off-peak service from the station is 12 District line trains per hour to Upminster and 12 to Earl's Court, of which six continue to Ealing Broadway and six continue to Richmond. At peak periods the number of trains per hour increases to 15 and some trains continue from Earl's Court to Wimbledon. Services towards central London operate from approximately 05:00 to 23:45 and services to Upminster operate from approximately 06:00 to 01:30. The journey time to Upminster is approximately two minutes, to Barking 15 minutes and to Tower Hill in central London 38 minutes.

Total number of passenger entries and exits at the station during the year is as follows:

London Underground annual entry and exit
Year	Millions
2021	0.51
2022	0.74
2023	0.84
2024	0.71
2025	0.83

With 0.83 million million entries and exits in 2025, it ranked 261st busiest London Underground station. It was the least busy station on the District line. (Note: Separate District line data was not counted for Kensington (Olympia).)

== Notes ==
Preceding station	London Underground	Following station
Hornchurch towards Wimbledon, Richmond or Ealing Broadway	District line	Upminster Terminus
