= Redden Court School =

Location
- Cotswold Road; Harold Wood; Romford, Havering, RM3 0TS; England; 51°35′12″N 0°13′54″E

Information
- Type: Academy
- Motto: Committed to Success for All
- Department for Education URN: 137396 Tables
- Ofsted: Reports
- Chair: Simon Durrant
- Headmaster: Anthony Henry
- Gender: Mixed
- Age: 11 to 16
- Enrolment: 1058
- Houses: Air, Fire, Water, Earth
- Website: https://www.reddencourtcloud.co.uk

Redden Court School is a secondary school with academy status located in Harold Wood, Romford, Havering, England. The school serves 1058 students age 11 to 16.

== History ==
The school was originally founded on 10th April 1934 as Ardleigh Green Senior School, under headteacher Reginald JJ Williams. In 1938, the school moved across the road, separating from Ardleigh Green Junior School to become the Redden Court Senior School, built on the site of Redden Court Manor House.

In 2003, the Queen visited the local area of Romford and made a special stop at the school. A student from Redden Court School had written to the Queen asking her to visit.

In September 2011, Reddon Court converted into an academy under the SFAET trust, which also runs nearby Royal Liberty and Sanders Draper schools. Unusually for an academy converter, the name of the school was not changed to include the word academy, and it remains Redden Court School.

In 2012, the percentage of pupils achieving 5 A*-C GCSEs (or equivalents) including English and maths GCSEs was 53%.

== Houses ==
Like many schools, Redden Court uses a house system. The houses are named after the four classical elements: Air, Fire, Water and Earth. They use those elements to sort different students into teams and they have house points and they get awards for every milestone they reach and each house has a team leader.

== Sports ==
Redden Court takes pride in their sporting accomplishments, and sets aside 10% of their admissions places in each year 7 cohort for children who pass a sports aptitude test.

== Notable alumni ==
- Susan Langley - Lady Mayor of London for 2025–26
