= Rush Green, London =

Coordinates: 51.5655°N 0.176°E

Rush Green
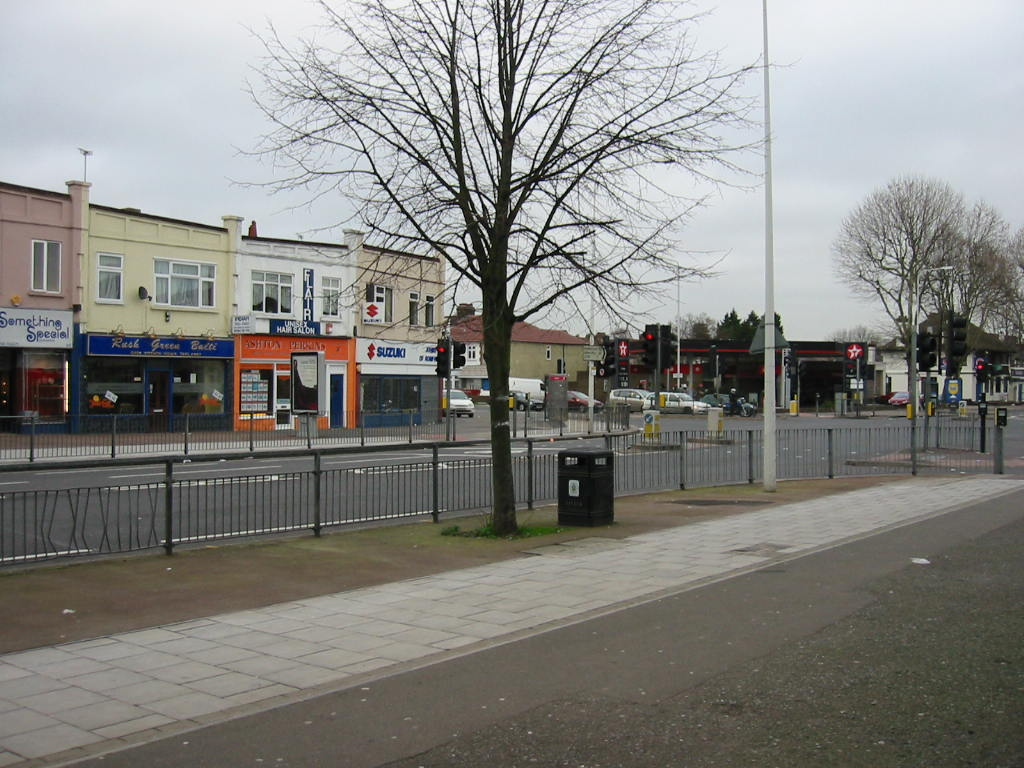
- Corner of Rush Green Road and Dagenham Road

- Location within Greater London
- OS grid reference: TQ505875
  - Charing Cross: 13.5 mi (21.7 km) WSW
- London borough: Barking & Dagenham; Havering
- Ceremonial county: Greater London
- Region: London
- Country: England
- Sovereign state: United Kingdom
- Post town: ROMFORD
- Postcode district: RM7
- Dialling code: 020; 01708
- Police: Metropolitan
- Fire: London
- Ambulance: London
- UK Parliament: Dagenham and Rainham; Romford
- London Assembly: City and East; Havering and Redbridge

Rush Green is a suburban area in Romford in East London, England. It straddles the boundary of the London Borough of Barking and Dagenham and the London Borough of Havering, and is located 13.5 miles (22 km) east-northeast of Charing Cross.

== Government ==
Rush Green is divided between the Eastbrook Ward in the London Borough of Barking and Dagenham and the Brooklands Ward in the London Borough of Havering, electing three councillors to Barking and Dagenham London Borough Council and three councillors to Havering London Borough Council. It is also divided between the Dagenham and Rainham and Romford parliamentary constituencies, each electing a member of parliament.

== Geography ==
The central part of the district is at the crossroads of Rush Green Road and Dagenham Road (in Havering), approximately half a mile south of Romford town centre. Several shops and businesses are located around this junction. Other parts extend further south along Dagenham Road into Barking and Dagenham; this neighbourhood is the location of Barking and Dagenham College and Rush Green Library, and was the site of Rush Green Hospital (once the main maternity unit for this part of London), now replaced by a housing estate.

Nearest places are Romford, Dagenham, Elm Park and Becontree Heath. Rush Green is roughly 62% White, 16% Black, 15% Asian, and 7% Mixed & Other (2021).

== Transport ==
The nearest tube station is Dagenham East tube station and the nearest railway station is Romford railway station.

== Sport ==
Since December 2015, Rush Green has been the site of the training ground for West Ham United F.C. after the club decided to move from their previous facility at Chadwell Heath. The women's team use Rush Green for home matches.
