= Leslie Oliver Oration =

The Leslie Oliver Oration is held annually at the Queen's Hospital, London. The lectures are named after Leslie Oliver who founded the Neurosurgical Unit at Oldchurch Hospital in Essex in 1945. In addition, he was one of the early practitioners of functional neurosurgery in the United Kingdom, writing several articles on the surgical management of Parkinson’s disease.

Each year an eminent researcher in the field of neurological sciences is invited to present the lecture.

== Lectures ==
- January 2008 - Kevin Warwick - Inaugural Lecture.
- January 2009 - Angela Vincent.
- January 2010 - Henry Marsh.
- January 2011 - Robert Will.
- January 2012 - Alan Hargens.
- September 2013 - Anthony King.
- January 2014 - Iain Dale.
- January 2015 - Richard Frackowiak.
- January 2017 - Professor Robert Brownstone.
- January 2019 - Professor David Holder.
