= Rush Green Hospital =

- Barking, Havering and Brentwood District Health Authority

Geography
- Location: Rush Green, London, England
- Coordinates: 51.5602°N 0.1763°E

Organisation
- Care system: NHS England
- Type: District general

History
- Former name: Romford Isolation Hospital
- Opened: 4 April 1901
- Closed: 1995

Rush Green Hospital was a hospital located at Rush Green in the London Borough of Barking and Dagenham in London from 1901 to 1995.

== History ==
The need for an isolation hospital for infectious diseases in the Romford area became apparent in 1896, with notified cases of smallpox, scarlet fever, diphtheria and typhoid fever. Approval for the hospital was given by the Local Government Board on 21 December 1898.

The hospital was opened as the Romford Isolation Hospital on 4 April 1901. It was governed by the Romford Joint Hospital Board, initially consisting of Romford Rural District Council and Romford Urban District Council. The hospital was located in the Dagenham parish of Romford Rural District. Dagenham parish became Dagenham Urban District in April 1926.

The facility was renamed Rush Green Emergency Hospital in 1939 as part of the Emergency Hospital Service. It joined the National Health Service as Rush Green Hospital in 1948. The maternity building opened on 19 October 1968, when patients were transferred from Oldchurch Hospital. It was built by Wates over 21 months at a cost of £750,000 (equivalent to £16,429,393 in 2023). It closed in 1995, with maternity services transferred to Harold Wood Hospital. The site has been redeveloped for housing, a nursing home and for use as a medical centre.

=== Hospital radio service ===
On 7 April 1969, Radio Rush Green, was set up by local radio enthusiast Brian Liester, who got permission to create a hospital radio station in the porters' lodge on the hospital grounds to serve the Rush Green Hospital site. By October 1985 the station had grown in popularity and permission was granted to expanded to serve the nearby Oldchurch Hospital, Romford. The station re-launched on 20 October 1985 as Hospital Radio 174, taking its unusual name from London Buses route 174 that served both Rush Green and Oldchurch hospitals. In 1993, the hospital radio service relocated to a new studio at Oldchurch Hospital, and continued to serve Rush Green Hospital until the hospital closed, where the radio station rebranded as Oldchurch Radio. In 2002, Oldchurch Radio closed to form Bedrock Radio.

== See also ==
- Healthcare in London
- List of hospitals in England
