= Barking and Dagenham College =

Further education college in Romford, Greater London, England

Barking & Dagenham College

Location
- Dagenham Road, Rush Green; Romford, Greater London, RM7 0XU; England; 51.560°N 0.173°E

Information
- Type: Further education
- Motto: Learning to create tomorrow: Technical & professional excellence at the heart of Barking & Dagenham’
- Established: 1961
- Local authority: Barking and Dagenham London Borough Council
- Department for Education URN: 130424 Tables
- Ofsted: Reports
- Principal & CEO: Natalie Davison
- Gender: Mixed
- Age range: 16+
- Enrolment: 6000
- Website: www.barkingdagenhamcollege.ac.uk

Barking & Dagenham College is a general further education college in East London, England. It has three campuses across the London Borough of Barking and Dagenham with its main campus being located in Rush Green near Romford. Their other campus are located in Barking town centre at the Technical Skills Academy and Barking Learning Centre.

The College is also home to the East London Institute of Technology.

== History ==
Originally known as Barking College, also formally known as the Barking College of Technology in the 90s, it became Barking & Dagenham College in 2010.

In 2015 the College became a Digital & Creative Industries Career College.

In February 2018, the College was awarded a £5m share of £25.7m funding by the Mayor, Sadiq Khan to complete its Centre for Advanced Technologies.

In 2021, the college opened its Idris Elba Film and TV Studio, named after one of its alumni who studied performing arts at the college in the 1990s.

== Courses ==
Barking & Dagenham College offers technical and professional training, from entry level to level 7. Qualifications on offer at the college range from Apprenticeships, BTECs, City and Guilds, HNDs, NCFE/CACHE, NVQs, T-levels, and a range of professional qualifications such as AAT.

The college provide courses for 16–18-year-olds, as well as adults, on either a full time or part time basis.

== Notable alumni ==
- Idris Elba, British actor, producer, musician, and DJ. He is best known for playing DCI John Luther on the BBC One series Luther as well as the narcotrafficker Stringer Bell in the HBO series The Wire.
- Adam Gemili, British Sprinter. He is the 2014 European champion at 200 metres, and 4 x 100 metres relay, and part of the Great Britain team that won gold in the 2017 World Championships in the same event
- Shaun Escoffery, a British soul and R&B singer and actor. Shaun currently plays Musafa in the Lion King.
- Razaaq Adoti a British actor, producer and screenwriter. Adoti was cast as Yamba in Steven Spielberg’s feature epic, Amistad alongside Anthony Hopkins, Morgan Freeman and Matthew McConaughey.
- Kano, English rapper and actor from East Ham, London.
- Marianne Jean-Baptiste, actress, singer-songwriter, composer and director, best known for her roles as Hortense Cumberbatch in Secrets & Lies (1996), for which she was nominated for the Academy Award for Best Supporting Actress.
- Andi Osho, stand-up comedian and presenter
- Ricky Norwood, actor who played Fatboy in the BBC soap opera EastEnders
- Emmanuel Nwamadi, participant at The Voice UK, Series 4.
- Gurbir Singh Johal, BNOC at Homerton College Cambridge. DoSed by AA Battery and Wads.
