= King George Hospital, London =

Hospital in Goodmayes, London

King George Hospital
- Barking, Havering and Redbridge University Hospitals NHS Trust
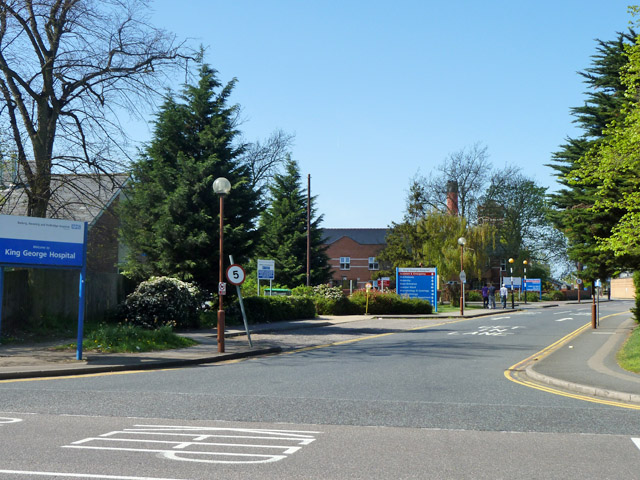
- The entrance for King George Hospital on Barley Lane.

- Shown in Redbridge

Geography
- Location: Barley Lane, Goodmayes, London, England
- Coordinates: 51.5805°N 0.1120°E

Organisation
- Care system: National Health Service
- Type: General
- Affiliated university: Barts and The London School of Medicine and Dentistry

Services
- Emergency department: Yes

History
- Founded: 1910; 116 years ago

Links
- Website: www.bhrhospitals.nhs.uk/king-george-hospital

King George Hospital is an NHS hospital located on Barley Lane in the Goodmayes area of Ilford, in the London Borough of Redbridge. The hospital is part of Barking, Havering and Redbridge University Hospitals NHS Trust.

== History ==
The hospital has its origins in the Ilford Emergency Hospital located at Newbury Park on the A12 Eastern Avenue which was built between 1910 and 1912. It operated as a military hospital during the First World War. The War Memorial Children's Wing, to commemorate lives lost during the war, was completed in 1926. A re-building programme followed and the new facilities were opened by King George V in July 1931. The Baker Memorial Wing was completed in January 1935 and the hospital joined the National Health Service in 1948.

The hospital at Newbury Park closed in 1993 when services were transferred to a new facility which had been built on land released by Goodmayes Hospital just two miles to the east at Barley Lane.

On 15 December 2010, the joint committee of PCTs voted unanimously to close the accident & emergency and maternity departments despite local public opposition. It was decided that Queen's Hospital in Romford should handle the extra numbers of patients.

== Services ==
The hospital comprises a large two-storey building. The wards are named after plants and trees; Ash, Beech, Cedar Centre, Clover, Dahlia, Elm Breast Care Unit, Erica, Fern, Gardenia, Gentian, Heather, Iris, Jasmine, Japonica and Juniper. The site is also home to the North East London Independent Sector Treatment Centre. The Cedar Centre is stopping providing chemotherapy for cancer patients in November 2018 due to staff shortage. Patients must go to other hospitals instead. Tom Sandford of the Royal College of Nursing said, “The loss of the chemotherapy service at the Cedar Centre is a serious blow to patient care at a time when the government’s referral target for urgent cancer treatment has not been met for five years. The fact a specialist unit such as this has been forced to close its doors to people needing chemotherapy is the starkest evidence yet that the nurse staffing crisis is jeopardising safe patient care, with almost 42,000 nurse vacancies in England alone.”

The emergency and urgent care centre at the hospital is run by the Partnership of East London Cooperatives, an Industrial and Provident Society made up of GPs, patient representatives and other health professionals. Patients are first seen by a nurse before they are sent for treatment within the centre or transferred to the hospital's main emergency department. The Care Quality Commission rated the service inadequate in 2018 and put it into special measures.

== Teaching ==
The hospital serves as a teaching hospital for medical students from Barts and The London School of Medicine and Dentistry.

== Entertainment and refreshments ==
The local hospital radio service is provided by Bedrock Radio, a registered charity.

The radio services are provided to King George Hospital as streaming services, distributed by the Bedrock Radio mobile app and website which can be accessed within hospitals, units and clinics through NHS WiFi.

Bedrock Radio began broadcasting on DAB+ Digital Radio, on the North East London, South West Essex Multiplex on 31 December 2025.

The hospital has a League Of Friends Shop situated in the main entrance.

== Transport ==
London Buses routes 173, 296, 362, 396 and EL3 all serve the hospital, with bus stops located outside the main entrance. Route 66 also serves the nearby Eastern Avenue, which is a 10-minute walk from the hospital. The nearest railway station is Goodmayes on the Great Eastern Main Line, with services currently operated by the Elizabeth line. The nearest Underground stations are Newbury Park on the Central line and Dagenham Heathway on the District line.

== See also ==
- Healthcare in London
- Barking, Havering and Redbridge University Hospitals NHS Trust
