= St George's Hospital, Havering =

St George's Hospital
- North East London Foundation Trust
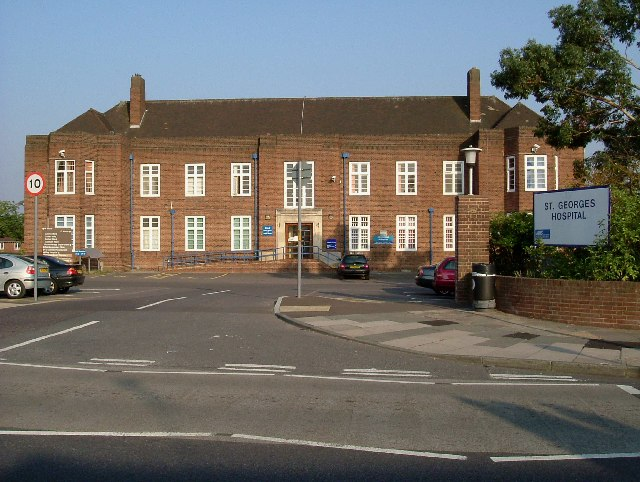
- St George's Hospital

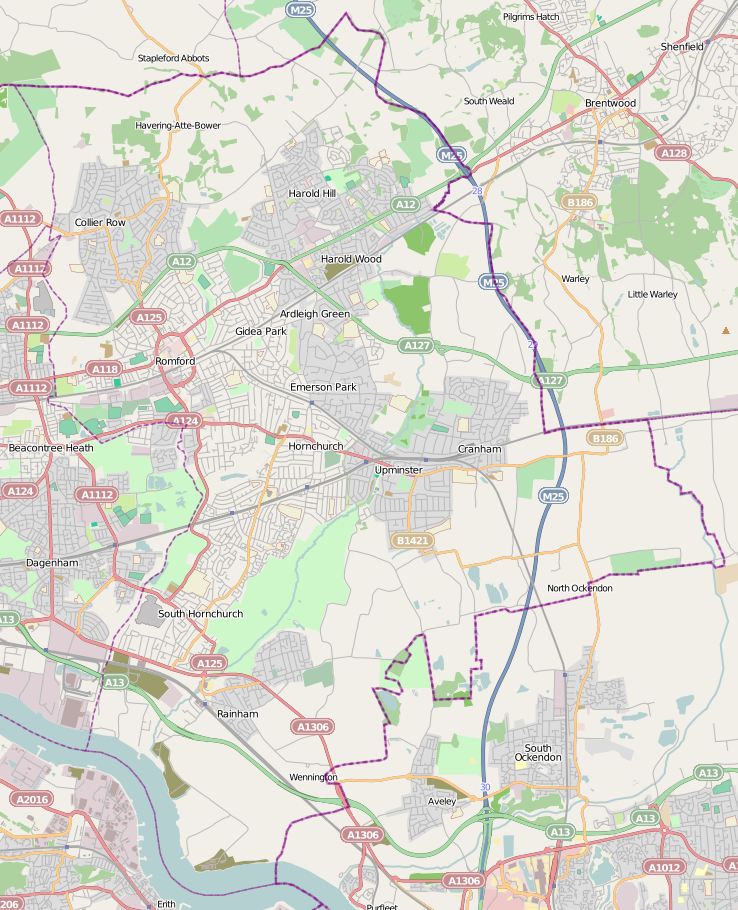
- Shown in Havering

Geography
- Location: Suttons Lane, Hornchurch RM12 6RS, London, England
- Coordinates: 51.5468°N 0.2186°E

Organisation
- Care system: NHS England
- Type: District General

History
- Founded: 1938; 88 years ago
- Closed: October 2012; 13 years ago

St George's Hospital was a hospital on Suttons Lane in Hornchurch in the London Borough of Havering, in northeast London, England. It opened in 1938 and closed in October 2012. The former hospital buildings and grounds have been converted into the St George's Park housing estate, St George's Health and Wellbeing Hub and the RAF Hornchurch Heritage Centre.

== History ==
=== Initial use ===
The need for the building followed the Local Government Act 1929 and the transfer of welfare functions from poor law unions to county and county borough councils. It was built by Essex County Council and was designed by John Stuart who held the position of County Architect from 1920 to 1945. The land was purchased from New College, Oxford and development began in 1933. Building work was undertaken by H. Arnold and Sons and the foundation stone was dated 1935. The opening ceremony was held in 1938 and it was named Suttons Institution. The placename 'Suttons' was an old manor in Hornchurch, believed to refer to the location south of the main settlement. The initial primary use was as a home for the elderly, with provision for children, nursing mothers and psychiatric care.

=== World War II ===
It was used as residential accommodation for airmen based at nearby RAF Hornchurch during the Second World War. It was also an auxiliary civilian facility to Oldchurch Hospital as part of the Emergency Hospital Service and formed part of Sector 1 of the London system.

=== National Health Service ===
Following the National Health Service Act 1946 it joined the National Health Service as St George's Hospital under the control of the Romford Group Hospital Management Committee in 1948.

Legionella was found in the hospital's water system in October 2012; the patients were transferred to other hospitals and St George's Hospital closed.

== Legacy ==
The former hospital buildings and grounds have been converted to a housing development called St George's Park. Part of the site is now the St George's Health and Wellbeing Hub. The RAF Hornchurch Heritage Centre is located in a former hospital building.

== See also ==
- Healthcare in London
- List of hospitals in England
