= Goodmayes Hospital =

Psychiatric hospital in Goodmayes, London

- North East London NHS Foundation Trust
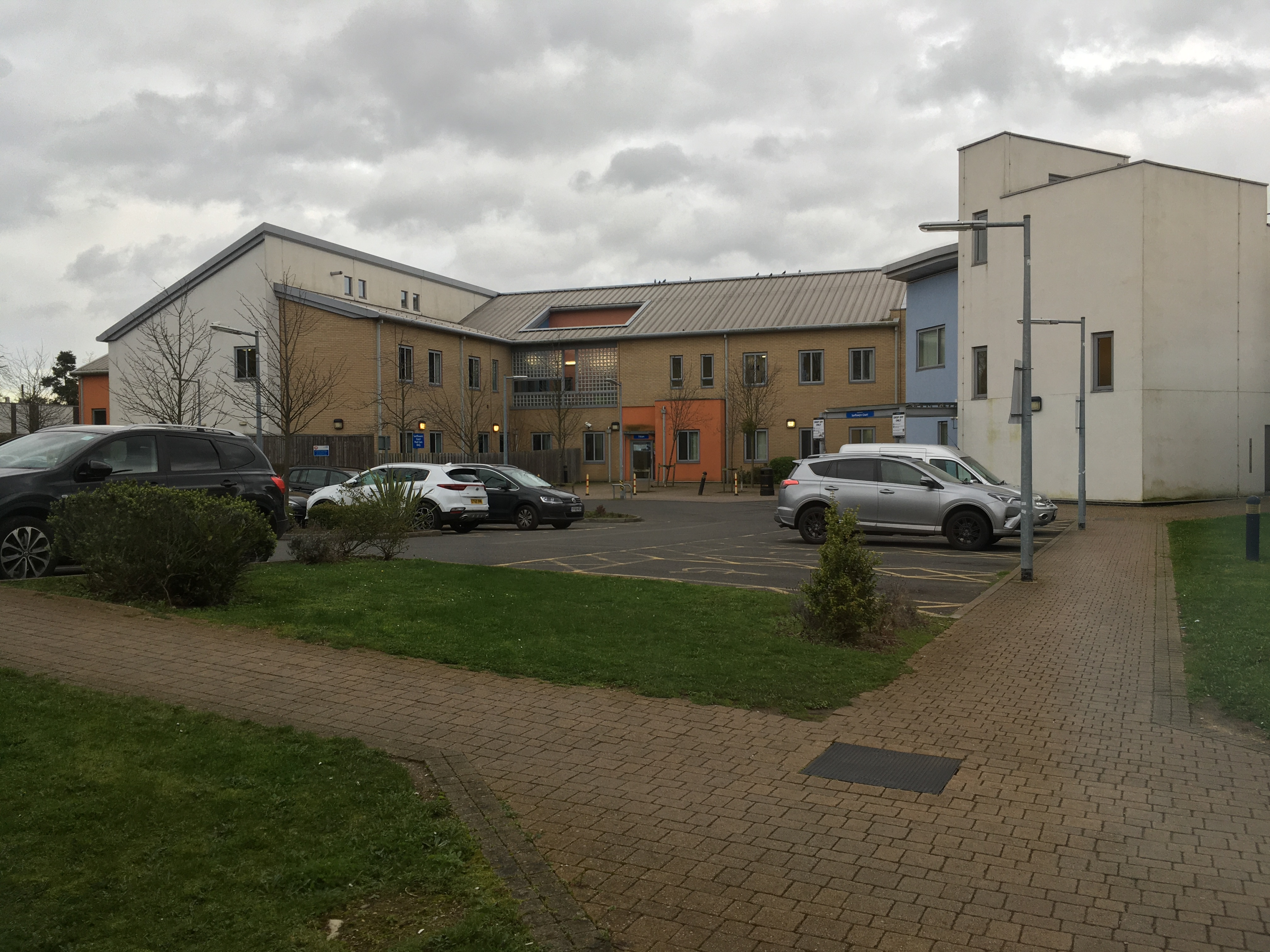
- Sunflowers Court, Goodmayes Hospital

- Shown in Redbridge

Geography
- Location: Goodmayes, London, England
- Coordinates: 51.5763°N 0.1105°E

Organisation
- Care system: National Health Service
- Type: Specialist
- Affiliated university: Barts and The London School of Medicine and Dentistry

Services
- Emergency department: No
- Speciality: Psychiatry

History
- Founded: 1901

Links
- Website: www.nelft.nhs.uk

Goodmayes Hospital is a mental health facility in Goodmayes in the London Borough of Redbridge. It is managed by the North East London NHS Foundation Trust.

== History ==
The site selected had previously been occupied by Blue House Farm. The hospital, which was designed by Lewis Angell using a Compact Arrow layout and built by Leslie and Co, opened as the West Ham Borough Asylum in August 1901. It became West Ham Mental Hospital in 1918 and a major expansion of the hospital was completed in February 1934.

Dr James Harvey Cuthbert, who served as the hospital superintendent, was a pioneer of electric shock therapy in the late 1930s. The hospital, which was badly bombed during the Second World War, joined the National Health Service as Goodmayes Hospital in 1948. Part of the site was released in the early 1990s to allow the King George Hospital to be built.

== Teaching ==
The hospital provides clinical placements in psychiatry for medical students from Barts and The London School of Medicine and Dentistry.

== Patient entertainment ==
In November 2015 the hospital's radio station, The Jumbo Sound, suffered major equipment damage following a radiator bursting and its subsequent humidity forcing the station off-air. Radio services resumed in April 2016 as Bedrock Radio Goodmayes reusing the studio space for localised programmes, as of 2019 The Goodmayes Hospital Studios were closed by request of the Trust. Bedrock Radio is available on the wards of Goodmayes Hospital.

== Transport ==
The hospital is served by London Buses routes 173, 362, EL3 and 396. The nearest railway stations are Goodmayes on the Great Eastern Main Line, with services provided by the Elizabeth line, and Newbury Park on the Central line.
