= Goodmayes =

Area of east London, England

Coordinates: 51°33′47″N 00°06′48″E

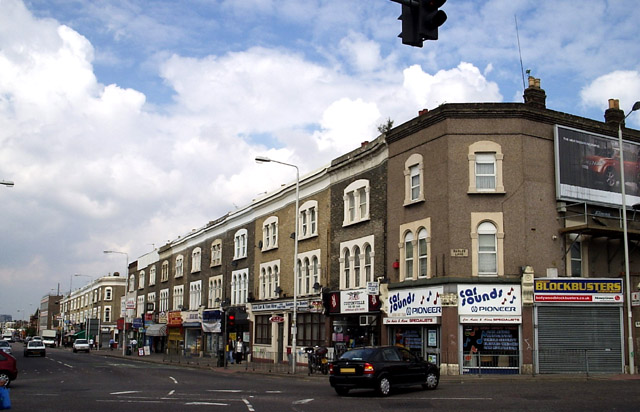
- Goodmayes High Road in 2005

- Location within Greater London
- Population: 13,072 (2011 Census. Ward)
- OS grid reference: TQ465865
  - Charing Cross: 11 mi (18 km) WSW
- London borough: Redbridge
- Ceremonial county: Greater London
- Region: London
- Country: England
- Sovereign state: United Kingdom
- Post town: ILFORD
- Postcode district: IG3
- Post town: ROMFORD
- Postcode district: RM6
- Dialling code: 020
- Police: Metropolitan
- Fire: London
- Ambulance: London
- UK Parliament: Ilford South
- London Assembly: Havering and Redbridge

Goodmayes is an area in East London, England. It is a ward of the London Borough of Redbridge, eleven miles north-east of Charing Cross, and forms part of both the Romford and Ilford post towns. Historically part of Essex, it was part of the Municipal Borough of Ilford until 1965 when it was incorporated into Greater London.

== History ==
The name Goodmayes and Goodmaistrete is recorded in 1456, and the name is likely to be associated with the family of John Godemay who was referred to in a document of 1319. A farm called Goodmath is recorded on the Chapman and Andre 1 inch to one mile map of Essex from 1777. Barley Lane is believed to be named after Dorothy Barley, the sister of Henry Barley, Dorothy was the last Abbess of nearby Barking Abbey (elected 1527).

Goodmayes was part of the Chadwell ward of the ancient parish of Barking, Essex. In 1888 the Chadwell and Great Ilford wards of Barking became a new parish of Ilford. This became Ilford Urban District in 1894 and was the Municipal Borough of Ilford from 1926 to 1965. The London Borough of Redbridge was formed in 1965 from Ilford and other areas. Councillors for the electoral ward of Goodmayes were first elected in 1964.

Goodmayes was largely undeveloped until the end of the 19th century, when large scale suburban development took place as London expanded. Most of the area here and in neighbouring Seven Kings was only built up between 1898 and 1910 by the developer A. C. Corbett who used new stations on the Great Eastern Railway to promote the new suburbs. Goodmayes station was built in 1901. Since then, little has changed in the area, although there have been, and still are, regeneration projects taking place within the area. However, the lines of Edwardian terraced housing continue to dominate the district with relatively few more recent additions.

Former extensive railway sidings near Goodmayes Station were closed in the 1970s and later redeveloped for retail purposes. A large Tesco store and a branch of Wickes and Masala Bazaar now occupy the site. On the A118 road, a Homebase store occupied the site until it was demolished in early 2023, and several flats being built in place of it, known as “One Goodmayes”- as of 2025.

== Facilities ==
Goodmayes Park, an area of open space containing a lake, basketball and tennis courts, is located here. It once contained a bandstand and a boathouse but these are no longer available. Another local park is named Barley Lane Park.

Brookside, based on Barley Lane, is, according to 'the quality network for inpatient CAMHS services' (QNIC), an adolescent unit that provides a high standard of care. It comprises Brookside Main, Interact Outreach service and the Brookside High Dependency Unit.

Barley Lane Primary School is located on Barley Lane.

On Goodmayes Lane there is a clinic known as 'Mayesbrook Clinic', however it is now abandoned.

The Eman Foundation Mosque is located on Ashgrove Road.

== Local media ==
Goodmayes Hospital & King George Hospital, Ilford had its own in-house Hospital Radio service. The service was operated volunteers as Goodmayes Hospital Radio Association (GHR) a registered charity and began broadcasting in 1975.

In 2015 the celebrated its 40th anniversary of broadcasting to patients of Goodmayes Hospital and the North East London NHS Foundation Trust. However, a burst radiator forced the station off-air causing £30,000 of damage. The Association merged the radio service with Bedrock Radio (a registered charity) and service was resumed.

Bedrock Radio provide a wider community health (hospital radio) service across East London, South Essex and immediate surrounding areas. Since 31 December 2025 the station broadcasts on DAB+ Digital Radio serving North East London, South West Essex.

=== Nearest places ===
- Ilford
- Becontree
- Dagenham
- Chadwell Heath
- Seven Kings
- Chigwell Row
- Collier Row
- Romford

== Transport ==
Goodmayes railway station is served by the Elizabeth line, which took over operation of the route and station from TFL Rail in May 2022. Services operate from Shenfield to Heathrow Airport and Reading.

Bus routes serving Goodmayes are London Buses services, operated by Stagecoach London and Blue Triangle. Services link the district with Barking, Ilford, Romford and Stratford. East London Transit route EL3 to Barking Riverside has serves the station and surrounding area.

The nearest London Underground stations are Barking on the District and Hammersmith & City lines, and Newbury Park on the Central line.

== Notable people ==
Actor Cardew Robinson was born in Goodmayes on 14 August 1917. He is best remembered for character and cameo roles, the best known being the fakir in the 1968 film Carry On Up the Khyber. He died in Roehampton in 1992.

Sir Ian Holm was born at Goodmayes Hospital on 12 September 1931 to Scottish parents, Jean Wilson Holm and James Harvey Cuthbert. His mother was a nurse and his father was a psychiatrist and superintendent of the West Ham Corporation Mental Hospital, as Goodmayes Hospital was then known. Cuthbert was one of the pioneers of electric shock therapy for treating mental illness. Ian Holm was created a CBE in 1989 and was knighted in 1998.

== Local Scout groups ==
Goodmayes is home to various local Scout groups, most notably 4th Goodmayes, who are located on Barley Lane next to St Paul’s Church. Established for 90 years, their home is traditionally called the Gaffery, which has had many different buildings in the past but they have remained on the same site. The group's current home is incorporated within the St Paul's Community Centre, which opened in 2005. Ages start from 6 up to 14, with the three sections called the Beavers, the Cubs and the Scouts. In 2010, they opened up their own Explorer Unit for 14- to 18-year-olds and incorporated it into a Young Leader Scheme, providing trained and qualified young leaders for other Scouting sections to assist their leaders.

The 7th Goodmayes scout group was established in 2006 and has over 100 members. It is the first scout group in East London to be run by Muslims. It has accomplished many tasks and activities, including visiting the House of Lords, Buckingham Palace, and partaking in numerous water sports activities including rafting, sailing, kayaking and canoeing. The group also aims to contribute to the community through activities such as tree planting and a sponsored walk for Comic Relief, raising over 1000 pounds. Other activities include archery, wall climbing and camping.
