= System C =

System C Healthcare Ltd
- Type: Private
- Industry: Health care and Social care
- Founded: 21 September 1983
- Founder: Markus Bolton
- Headquarters: Stratford Upon Avon, Warwickshire
- Area served: United Kingdom
- Number of employees: 700+ (2023)
- Parent: CVC Capital Partners
- Website: systemc.com

System C Healthcare Limited is a British supplier of health information technology systems and services, based in Maidstone, Kent, specialising in the health and social care sectors.

== Overview ==
System C supplies National Health Service organisations. It is involved with one of twelve Global Digital Exemplars at University Hospitals Bristol and Weston NHS Foundation Trust.

== Company history ==
The company was founded on 21 September 1983, and registered as Mythminster Ltd. The company was renamed several times before being called System C Healthcare Ltd on 3 June 2005.

In June 2005, the company floated on the Alternative Investment Market (AIM).

In 2010, it was named one of the UK's top 100 mid-sized companies to work for.

In 2011, System C delisted from AIM and was acquired by McKesson Corporation, and in 2014, System C was acquired by Symphony Technology Group from McKesson Corporation.

== Acquisitions ==
In January 2008, System C acquired Care Records Ltd, a clinical system developer based in Nottingham. Liquidlogic Ltd, a company involved in social care information systems, was acquired in July 2009.

In 2015, System C acquired The Learning Clinic. A year later, it purchased Careflow Connect Ltd for an undisclosed amount.

In 2021, CVC Capital Partners acquired System C from Symphony Technology Group.

In July 2021, System C acquired the medicines management software firm WellSky International.

In February 2023, System C acquired the neonatal and maternity management software firm Clevermed. In April of that year, the company purchased Oxford Computer Consultants, a British IT business specialising in integrated contracts and finance for social care within local government.

In August 2025, System C acquired MYP Technologies, an Australian health and care management technology provider, to expand its social care and maternity product offerings across Australia and New Zealand.
