= Queen's Hospital =

Hospital in Romford, London

- Barking, Havering and Redbridge University Hospitals NHS Trust
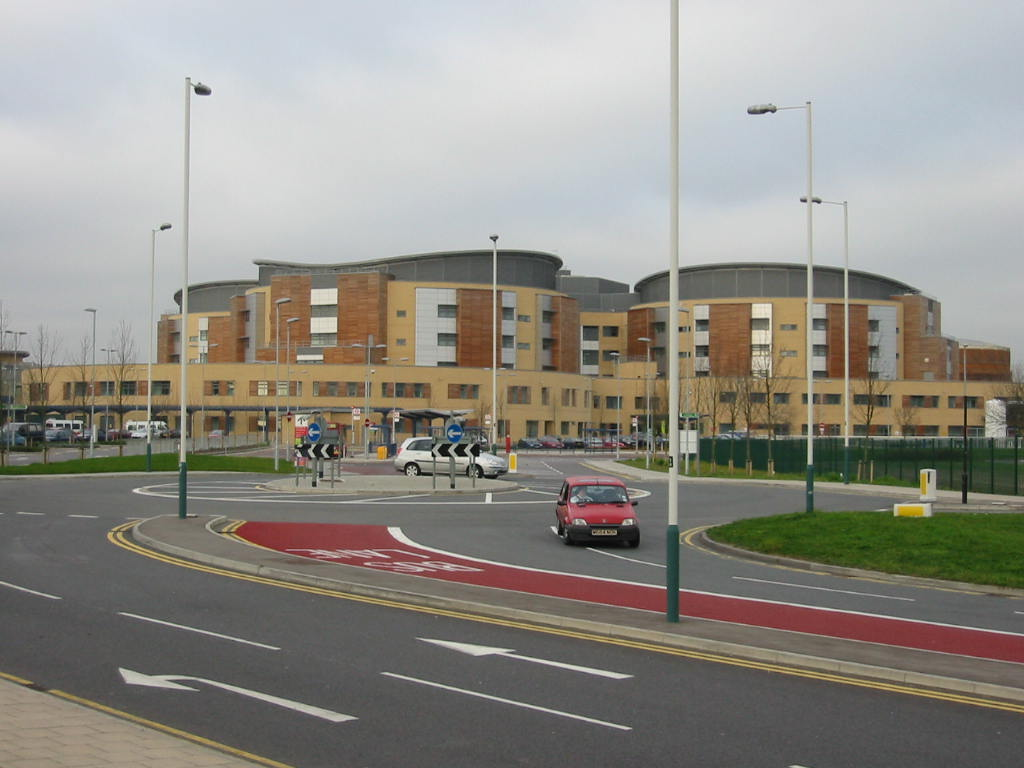

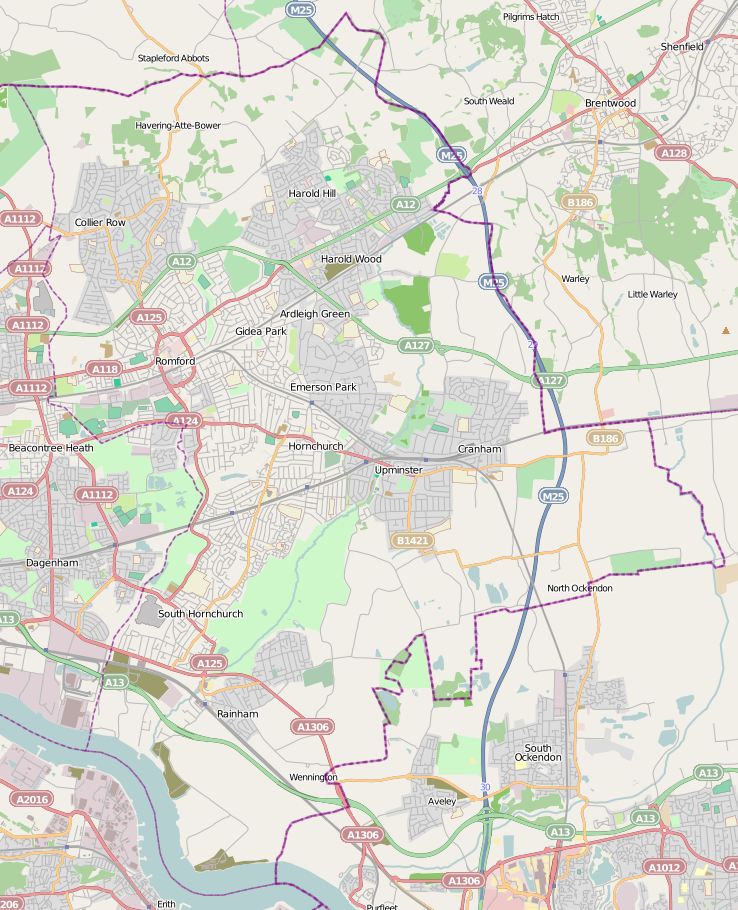
- Shown in Havering

Geography
- Location: Romford, London, England
- Coordinates: 51.5691°N 0.1789°E

Organisation
- Care system: National Health Service
- Type: General
- Affiliated university: Barts and The London School of Medicine and Dentistry

Services
- Emergency department: Yes
- Beds: 939

Helipads
- Helipad: Yes

History
- Founded: October 2006; 20 years ago

Links
- Website: www.bhrhospitals.nhs.uk/queens-hospital

Queen's Hospital is a large teaching hospital in Romford in the London Borough of Havering. It was built on the site of the former Oldchurch Park, a short distance south of the town centre. It was opened in 2006 and serves a population of about 800,000 people. It is run by Barking, Havering and Redbridge University Hospitals NHS Trust.

== History ==
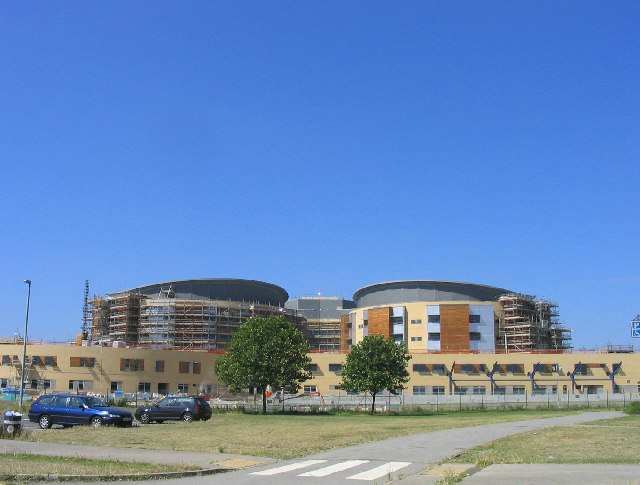
The hospital under construction in 2005

The hospital was procured under a private finance initiative (PFI) contract to replace Harold Wood Hospital, Oldchurch Hospital, Rush Green Hospital and St George's Hospital, Havering in 2004. It was designed by Jonathan Bailey Associates and built by Bovis Lend Lease at a cost of £312 million on Rom Valley Way, near the now demolished Romford Ice Arena. Construction was completed in October 2006.

== Facilities ==
The hospital comprises four, circular, five-storey buildings, connected and surrounded by a wider two-storey building. The ground and first floor levels generally consist of diagnostic treatment, whilst the upper levels consist of inpatient services and wards. Facilities include an accident and emergency (A&E) department, hyper-acute stroke unit (HASU), birthing centre, renal dialysis unit, specialist neuroscience centre, 16 operating theatres and a helipad.

== Services ==
The hospital's A&E department treats around 150,000 patients every year.

== Performance ==
In July 2013 the Care Quality Commission issued a formal warning about the hospital, particularly for the accident and emergency department. In March 2017, after receiving a positive review from the care quality commission, the hospital was taken out of special measures and praised by the commission for its work in a number of areas.

== Teaching ==
The hospital serves as a teaching hospital for medical students from Barts and The London School of Medicine and Dentistry. The Leslie Oliver Oration is held annually.

== Transport ==
London Buses routes 5, 128, 175, 193, 365, 496, 498, 499 and SL12 directly serve bus stops outside the hospital, while routes 103 and 174 alight at Oldchurch Road, a short walk away from the hospital. The nearest railway station is Romford, on the Great Eastern Main Line, the Elizabeth line, and the Liberty line of London Overground; the nearest London Underground station is Elm Park on the District line.

== Hospital Radio ==
Bedrock Radio is a registered charity broadcasting from the Cornwall Suite studios located within Queen's Hospital.

In June 2022, Bedrock Radio introduced a ward radio system at Queen's Hospital, funded and operated by Bedrock Radio reusing the cabling from the defunct bedside TV patient entertainment network. The new radios are connected by WiFi to a bespoke Hospital Radio Network dedicated to streaming audio to the wards.

Bedrock previously served Oldchurch Hospital and Harold Wood Hospital until the new Queen's Hospital opened in October 2006. Hospital Radio in Havering has been operating since 14 February 1964.

== See also ==
- Healthcare in London
- List of hospitals in England
