= John Shaa =

Member of the Parliament of England

Sir John Shaa
- Died: c. 1503
- Buried: Church of St Thomas of Acres, London
- Spouse: Margaret Ilam
- Issue: Edmund Shaa; Reynold Shaa; Thomas Shaa; Audrey Shaa; Juliana Shaa
- Father: John Shaa
- Mother: unknown

Sir John Shaa or Shaw (died c. 1503) was a London goldsmith. He served as engraver and later joint Master of the Mint, and as Sheriff and Lord Mayor of London. While Lord Mayor he entertained ambassadors from Scotland, and was among those who welcomed Catherine of Aragon to England. He is mentioned in a poem by William Dunbar.

== Family ==
John Shaa was the son of John Shaa of Rochford, Essex, and the nephew and eventual heir of Sir Edmund Shaa, Lord Mayor of London in 1482, whose son, Hugh Shaa, had died without male issue. Shaa was also the nephew of Ralph Shaa (d. 1484), noted for having preached a sermon at Paul's Cross impugning the legitimacy of Edward IV's children, including his heir, Edward V.

Shaa had a sister, Elizabeth (d. 21 August 1503), who married William Poyntz (d. 1504), esquire, of North Ockendon, Essex, by whom she had four sons and two daughters.

== Career ==
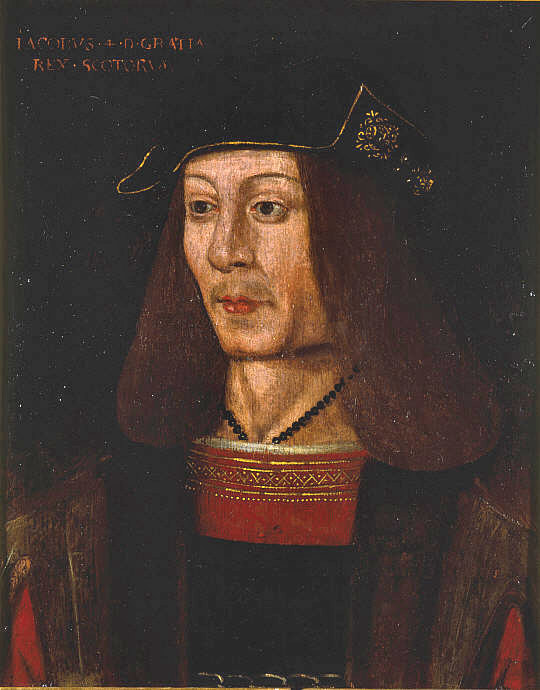
James IV of Scotland, whose ambassadors Sir John Shaa entertained as Lord Mayor

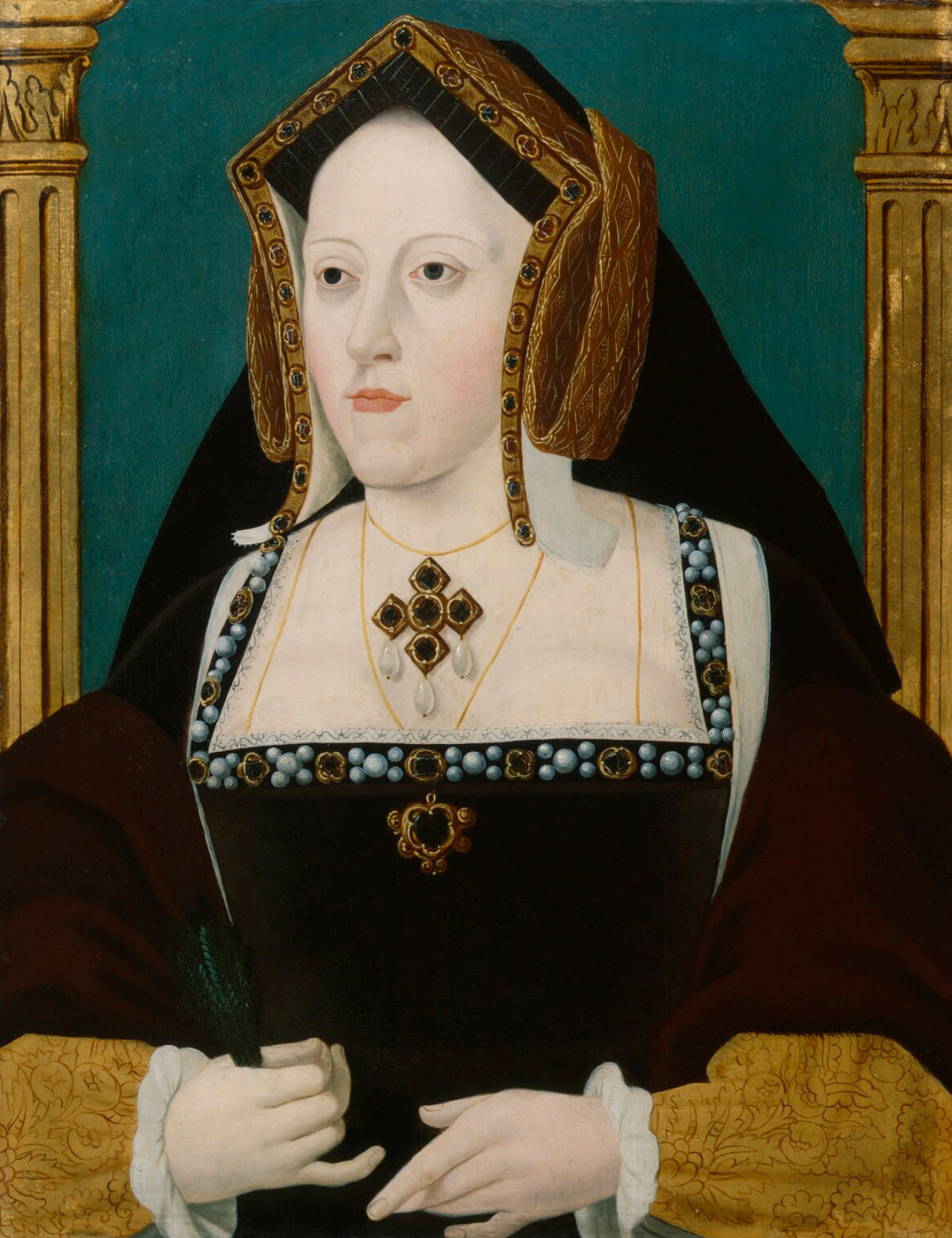
Catherine of Aragon, whom Sir John Shaa, as Lord Mayor, welcomed to London

Shaa was a London goldsmith. From 1462 until 1483, his uncle, Edmund, also a goldsmith, had been engraver to the Royal Mint. John Shaa succeeded him in the post, and served for several years as engraver until, on 20 November 1492, he and his fellow goldsmith, Sir Bartholomew Rede, were appointed joint Masters of the Mint.

Shaa's sales of silver and gold plate to Henry VII are recorded in the privy purse expenses, and on two occasions he was compensated for furnishing the gold heraldic knots and roses for the Order of the Garter. His financial dealings with Henry VII were considerable. On 13 January 1499, he was reimbursed £667 2s 11d for supplying New Year's gifts and for the 'making of divers jewels and setting and polishing of stones', as well as for funds supplied to 'Master Seymour' for the 'works at Windsor'.

Shaa was elected Member of Parliament for City of London in 1495 and Sheriff of London in 1496-7, and with his fellow Sheriff, Richard Haddon, was among those dubbed knight in June 1497 by Henry VII at the foot of London Bridge after the Battle of Blackheath.

In 1501 Shaa was elected Lord Mayor. During his term of office, ambassadors were sent from Scotland to arrange the marriage of Henry VII's elder daughter, Margaret Tudor, with James IV, King of Scotland. At a banquet hosted by Shaa for the ambassadors in Christmas week in December 1501, the poet William Dunbar declaimed verses in honour of the City of London which included these lines in praise of Shaa:

London, thou art of Townes A per se . . .
Thy famous Maire, by pryncely governaunce,
With swerd of justice, thee rulith prudently.
No Lord of Parys, Venyce, or Floraunce
In dignytie or honoure goeth to hym nye.
He is exempler, loode-ster, and guye;
Principall patrone and roose orygynalle,
Above all Maires as maister moost worthy:
London, thou art the flour of Cities all.

During Shaa's term as Lord Mayor, Catherine of Aragon arrived in London as the bride of Henry VII's eldest son, Arthur, Prince of Wales. Shaa was part of the deputation of London civic authorities and members of the livery companies who were instructed to meet her ship 'in their several barges, after their manner accustomed, at Deptford', and to 'hail and salute her in the best manner they can'.

While he was Lord Mayor, Shaa instituted a 'court of requests' in the City of London to administer justice more equitably. It proved unpopular, as it was said to have favoured the poor more than 'justice and good law required'.

During his term as Lord Mayor, Shaa caused a kitchen to be added to the London Guildhall. He was said to have been 'the first that kept his feast there'. He also instituted another tradition, the procession from the Guildhall to the state barge on which the Lord Mayor travelled to Westminster to be sworn.

Shaa was appointed for a second term as MP in 1503, though as Parliament did not assemble until 25 January 1504 he may have died before attending. He made his will on 26 December 1503, which was proved 14 May 1504, and was buried in the Mercers' chapel in the church of St Thomas of Acres.

Sir John Shaa's arms were Argent, a chevron between three lozenges ermine.

== Marriage and issue ==
In 1479, Shaa married Margaret Ilam, the daughter of a London mercer, Thomas Ilam (d. 1482), and Jane Verdon, by whom he had three sons and several daughters, including:

- Edmund Shaa of Horndon on the Hill, Essex, eldest son and heir, who married Lora Wentworth, the daughter of Sir Roger Wentworth (d. 9 August 1539) and Anne Tyrrell, by whom he was the father of Alice Shaa, wife of William Poley.
- Reynold Shaa.
- Thomas Shaa.
- Audrey or Etheldreda Shaa, who married firstly Sir John Shaa's ward, John Writtle; secondly William Ayloffe (d. 1517), a Bencher of Lincoln's Inn, by whom she was the grandmother of William Ayloffe (d. 1584), Justice of the Common Pleas; and thirdly Sir John Gainsford (d. 1540) of Crowhurst, Surrey, by whom she had one son, John Gainsford, who died without issue, and five daughters, including Audrey Gainsford, who married firstly George Taylor of Lingfield, Surrey; secondly Sir George Harper; and thirdly George Carleton.
- Elizabeth Shaa (died 1502), who married William Poyntz of North Ockendon. Their eldest son John Poyntz married Anne Sibelles, who became "mother of the maids" in the household of Mary I of England. A younger son Thomas Poyntz was a merchant and friend of William Tyndale.

After the death of Sir John Shaa around 1503, his widow, Margaret (née Ilam), married, as his second wife, Sir John Raynsford of Colchester and Bradfield Hall, Essex, by whom she had a daughter, Julian Raynsford, who married Sir William Waldegrave of Smallbridge, Suffolk.

== See also ==
- List of Sheriffs of the City of London
- List of Lord Mayors of London
- City of London (elections to the Parliament of England)

== Notes ==
Civic offices
Preceded by William Remyngton	Lord Mayor of London; 1501-1502	Succeeded by Bartholomew Reade
