= John Kingdon =

John Kingdon may refer to:

- John W. Kingdon, American political scientist
- John Abernethy Kingdon, British surgeon and historian

== See also ==
- Johnny Kingdom (Walter John Kingdon), English wildlife filmmaker and photographer
