= John Pointz (disambiguation) =

John Pointz or Poyntz may refer to:

- John Poyntz (c.1485–1544), courtier and politician
- John Poyntz (died 1547) courtier and husband of Anne Poyntz
- John Morice (1568-1618) later Sir John Poyntz, MP for Appleby and Chamberlain of the Exchequer
- John Pointz, (died 1633), English landowner and politician who sat in the House of Commons in 1593
- John Pointz (MP for Gloucestershire), MP for Gloucestershire (UK Parliament constituency) 1368–1372
