= Edmund Shaa =

Fifteenth century Lord Mayor of London (died 1488)

Sir Edmund Shaa
- Died: 20 April 1488
- Spouses: Julian, Lady Shaa (maiden name unknown)
- Issue: Hugh Shaa; Margaret Shaa; Katherine Shaa
- Father: John Shaa
- Mother: unknown

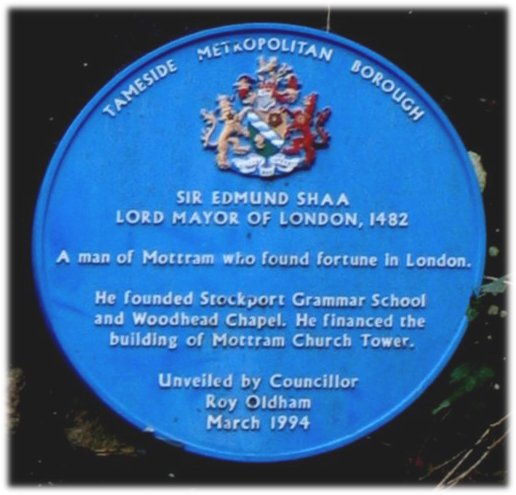
Blue Plaque to Sir Edmund Shaa, by Mottram Church

Sir Edmund Shaa or Shaw (died 20 April 1488) was a London goldsmith, Sheriff of London in 1475 and Lord Mayor of London in 1482. Shaa lent money to Edward IV and, as mayor (at least), was extensively involved in the coronation of Edward IV's brother Richard III. He was later knighted and made a member of the Privy Council.

== Family ==
Edmund Shaa, the son of John Shaa of Dukinfield, Cheshire, is said to have been born in the district of Mottram in Longdendale, Cheshire. He was the brother of Ralph Shaa, and the uncle of Sir John Shaa (died c. 1503), Lord Mayor of London in 1501. Lord Mayor of London. His granddaughter, Julian Browne, was the second wife of Sir John Mundy, Lord Mayor of London.

== Career ==
In 1450 Shaa was apprenticed to a London goldsmith, probably Robert Butler. He completed his apprenticeship in 1458, and in 1462 was appointed engraver to the Royal Mint at the Tower of London and Calais. He held the office for the next twenty years.

Shaa was mayor in interesting times. It is sometimes stated that Shaa's brother, Ralph Shaa, preached against the legitimacy of Edward IV's marriage and that Shaa (as mayor) offered the crown to Richard III. Shaa is a character in William Shakespeare's play Richard III. Sir John Shaa, the first 16th century Lord Mayor, was his nephew, while Sir William Browne (d. 3 June 1514), Lord Mayor in 1513, was his son-in-law. He was knighted in 1483.

Shaa made his will on 20 March 1488, and died 20 April 1488. He was buried in the Mercers' chapel in the church of St Thomas of Acon. In 1506 his son-in-law, Thomas Rich, was his surviving executor.

Amongst numerous legacies at his death was a sum to found a grammar school at Stockport, where his parents had been buried. He is commemorated by a Blue Plaque on Church Brow, Mottram.

== Marriage and issue ==
Shaa married, by 1471, a wife named Julian (d. July 1494), whose surname is unknown, by whom he had a son and two daughters:

- Hugh Shaa, who died without issue.
- Margaret Shaa, who married a London mercer, Thomas Rich, the son of John Rich (d. 29 July 1458) by his wife Isabel, and grandson and heir of Richard Rich (d.1463-4), Sheriff of London in 1441. Margaret Shaa's husband, Thomas Rich, was alive in 1506, but had died by 1513; in the will of Margaret's brother-in-law, Sir William Browne, dated 29 May 1513, she is described as 'Margaret Riche, widow'.
- Katherine Shaa, who after her father's death married Sir William Browne (d. 3 June 1514), Lord Mayor of London in 1513, son and heir of Sir John Browne, Lord Mayor of London in 1480, and cousin of Sir William Browne, Lord Mayor of London in 1507. By Sir William Browne, Katherine had a son, William. After the death of Katherine (née Shaa), Sir William Browne married Alice Keble, the daughter of Henry Keble, Lord Mayor of London in 1510, by whom he had two sons, John and Matthew, and two daughters, Anna and Elizabeth.

== See also ==
- List of Sheriffs of the City of London
- List of Lord Mayors of London
