= Church of St Mary Magdalene, North Ockendon =

Church in Greater London, England

Coordinates: 51.542°N 0.288°E

St Mary Magdalene
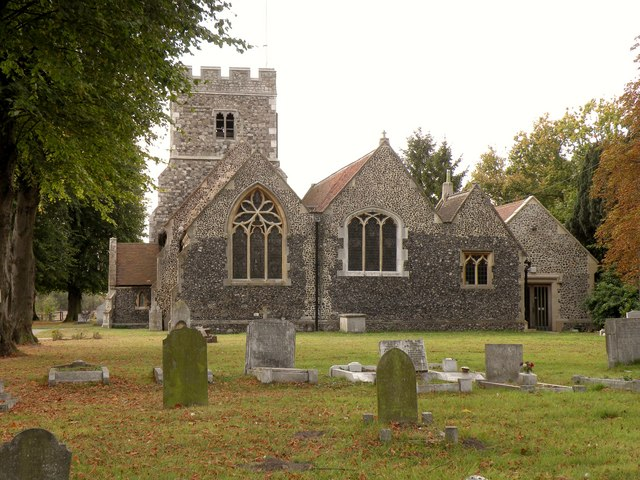
- St Mary Magdalene Church, North Ockendon
- St Mary Magdalene
- Denomination: Church of England (Anglican)
- Website: https://www.achurchnearyou.com/church/6499/

Administration
- Province: Canterbury
- Diocese: Chelmsford
- Archdeaconry: Barking
- Deanery: Havering
- Parish: The Parish of North Ockendon

The church of St Mary Magdalene is a Church of England religious building in North Ockendon, Greater London, England (and within the Upminster post town). It is a Grade I listed building and is dedicated to Jesus' companion Mary Magdalene.

== History ==
Most of the church building dates back to the fourteenth century, on the site of an earlier church. The tower was built in the fifteenth century and was used by the Reverend William Derham in the first accurate measurement of the speed of sound. The church was heavily restored in 1858 by Richard Armstrong, and his work was paid for by Richard Benyon of Cranham Hall, a wealthy local landowner. A recent extension to the north side was completed in 2003.

== Interior ==
The pulpit is of Elizabethan appearance, but is more likely to be 17th century. The baptismal font and royal arms (made of Coade stone) were both made in 1842. The reredos behind the altar, depicting the Last Supper, dates to 1879. The numerous monuments are mostly associated with the local Poyntz family. Monumental brasses include one to former vicar Edward Foley Evans, who died in 1933. The main monument is a large stone effigy of Sir Gabriel Poyntz (1538–1608) and his wife Etheldreda, who are lying on a marble tomb chest. Over them is a wooden tester without column supports, decorated with images of the sun, moon, clouds and stars. Gabriel Poyntz placed a series of smaller memorials to commemorate his family, including his father Thomas Poyntz and his uncle and aunt John and Anne Poyntz.

== Music ==
The organ is a 2 manual Brindley & Foster instrument currently in the care of Martin M Cross builders (Grays) and on which the pitch is rather sharp at A=460.

== Bells ==
The tower has a peal of 6 bells hung for change ringing. They are a descending scale in G major. The heaviest bell, the Tenor, weighs approx. 9½ cwt. The bells are rung from the ground floor and, unusually, are hung in an anticlockwise direction.

== Churchyard ==
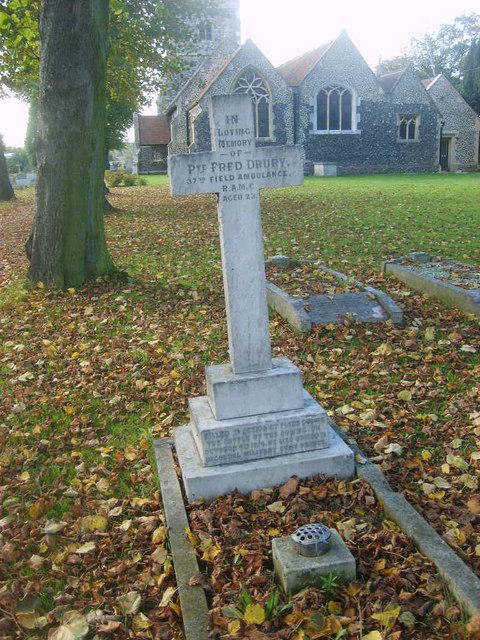
One of the World War I graves in the churchyard

The churchyard contains war graves of three British Army personnel of World War I. There is also a well, said to be associated with Saint Cedd.
