= John Abernethy Kingdon =

British surgeon and historian (1828–1906)

John Abernethy Kingdon (1828–1906) was a nineteenth century surgeon and historian.

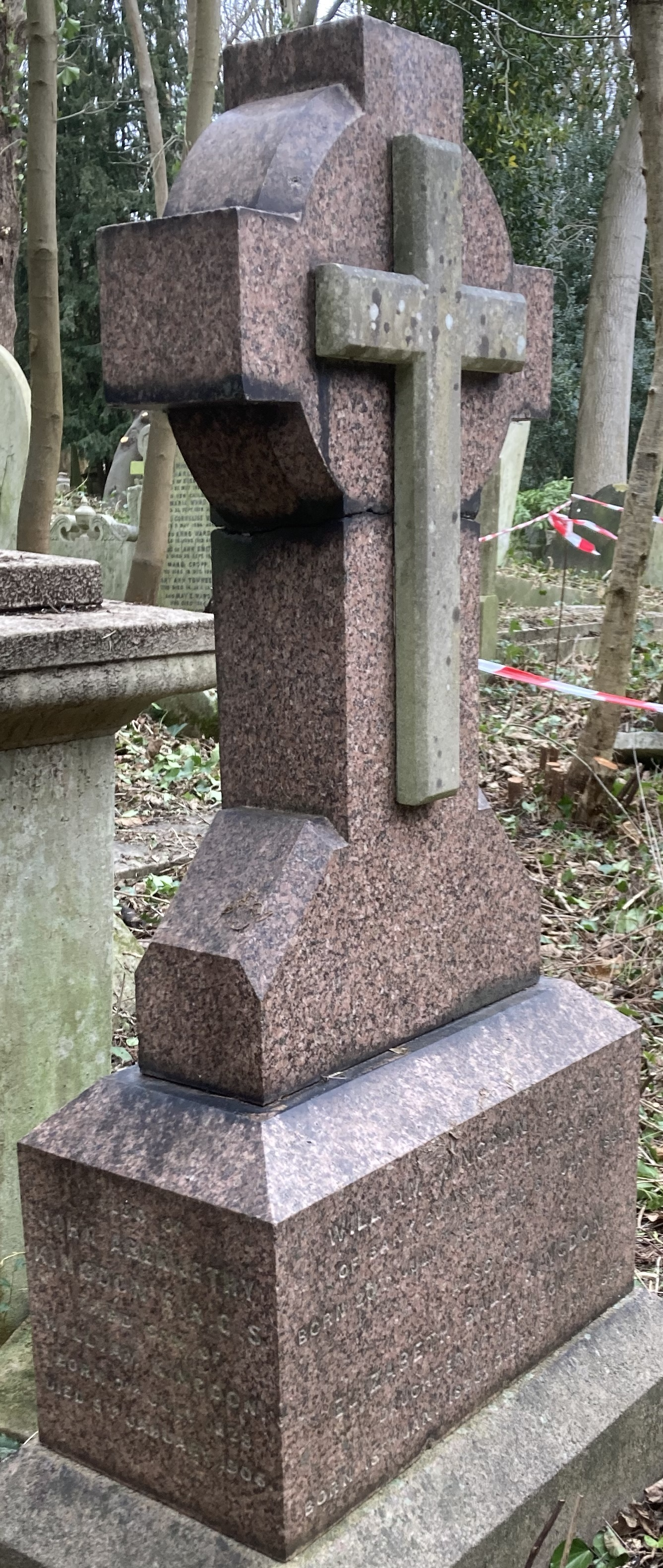
Grave of John Abernethy Kingdon in Highgate Cemetery

== Biography ==
He was the son of the surgeon William Kingdon and had John Abernethy as godfather.

Kingdon was a member of the Worshipful Company of Grocers. He became an influential figure within the livery company. He was for many years of their governing body, the court and was Master in 1883. He edited and wrote an introduction to Facsimile of first volume of ms. archives of the Worshipful Company of Grocers of the city of London, A.D. 1345-1463. He also wrote about Thomas Poyntz and Richard Grafton, two sixteenth century members of the Grocers Company who had been involved in getting English translations of the Bible printed.

He worked at St Bartholomew's Hospital, London, and was surgeon to the City of London Truss Society, "for the relief of the ruptured poor throughout the kingdom", from 1858 to 1888.

He died in January 1906 and was buried on the western side of Highgate Cemetery.
