= Bartholomew Reade =

English goldsmith and politician

Sir Bartholomew Reade (or Rede; died 1505) was an English goldsmith and politician who served as Lord Mayor of London.

== Family ==
Reade was born in Cromer, Norfolk. His parents were Roger Reade (d. 1470) and his wife Catherine, and he had at least two siblings, John and Simon. He was already well-established in London by 1486, when he is mentioned in his mother's will as a "citizen and goldsmith of London".

== Offices ==
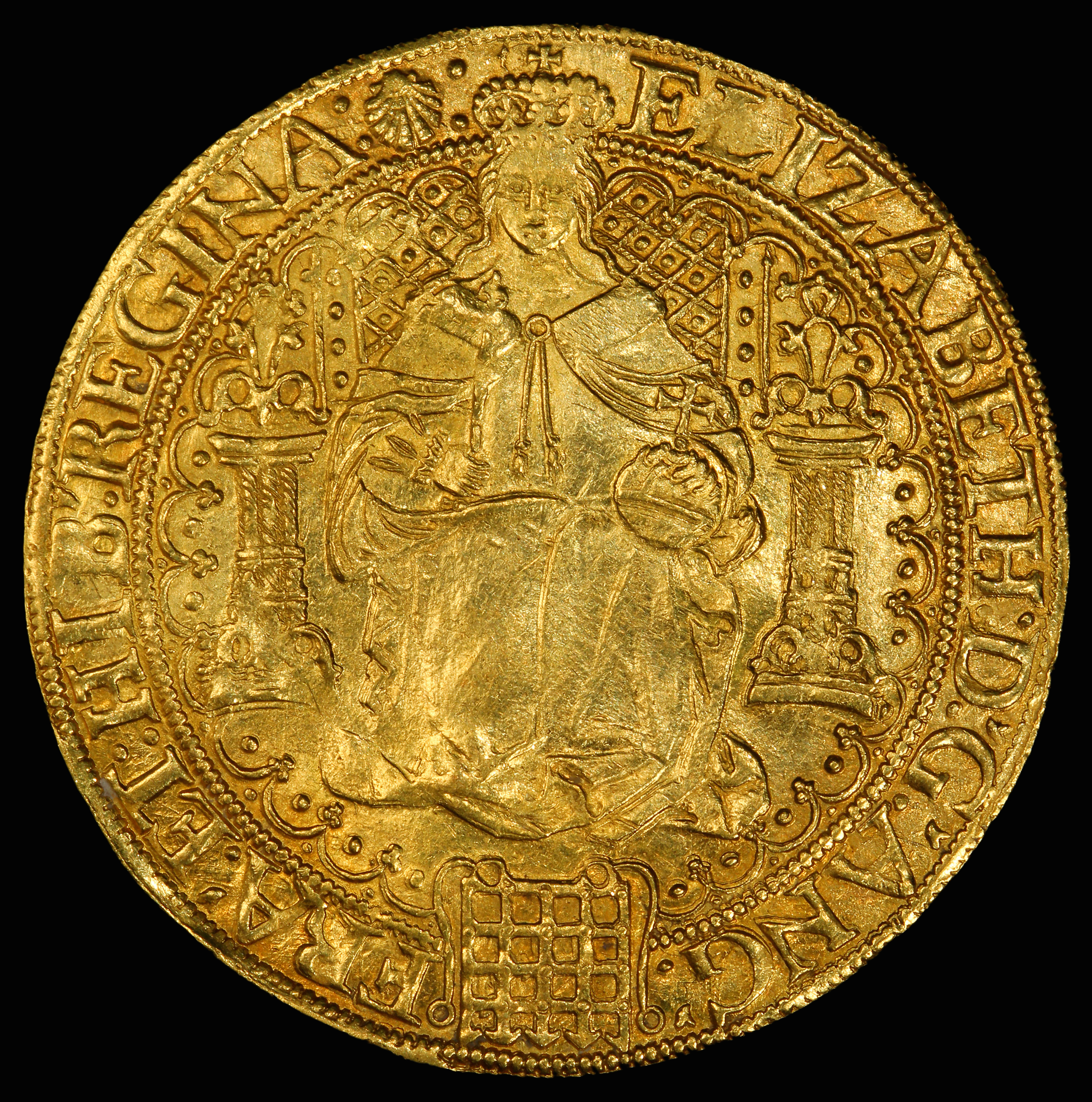
A gold sovereign of Elizabeth I. The first gold sovereigns were minted by Bartholomew Reade for her grandfather Henry VII

Reade, a goldsmith, was for several years the Master of the Mint. Along with Lord Daubeney, he was commissioned to mint the first gold sovereigns in 1489. He was one of the Sheriffs of London in 1497. Two years later, he was alderman of the ward of Aldersgate. He was elected Lord Mayor of London in 1502, succeeding fellow goldsmith John Shaa. During his mayoralty, he used Crosby Place, which he had acquired in 1501, as his hall. He is recorded as throwing extravagant feasts for ambassadors sent by Emperor Maximilian.

== Death ==
Reade died in 1505. He and his wife were interred at the church of St John Zachary, the burial place of many of the city's prominent goldsmiths. In his will, he established a free school in his home town of Cromer, under the management of the Goldsmiths' Company.

Civic offices
Preceded by John Shaa	Lord Mayor of London; 1502-1503	Succeeded by William Capel
