= St Paul's Cross =

Medieval preaching cross and pulpit in London

Coordinates: 51.5142°N 0.0978°W

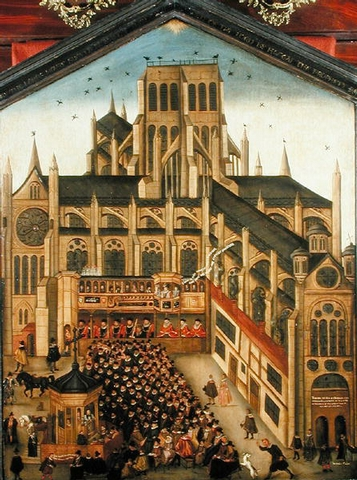
A sermon preached from Paul's Cross (in the lower-left corner) in 1614 (the cathedral's central tower is missing its spire, lost after a fire in 1561).

Paul's Cross (alternatively "Powles Crosse") was a preaching cross and open-air pulpit in St Paul's Churchyard, the grounds of Old St Paul's Cathedral, City of London. It was the most important public pulpit in Tudor and early Stuart England, and many of the most important statements on the political and religious changes brought by the Reformation were made public from here. The pulpit stood in 'the Cross yard', the open space on the north-east side of St Paul's Churchyard, adjacent to the row of buildings that would become the home of London's publishing and book-selling trade.

A monumental memorial column called "Paul's Cross" with a golden statue of St Paul stands in this area of the Cathedral precinct since the early 20th century, but it is not on the exact spot where Paul's Cross stood. A stone carved with the words 'Here stood Paul's Cross' marks the actual location of the pulpit as it stood from 1449 until 1635, when it was taken down during Inigo Jones' renovation work.

== History ==
=== Pre-15th century ===
The eastern half of the Cross churchyard had been controlled by the Corporation in the Middle Ages: it was the site of the London 'folkmoot' (or general assembly of the people). The earliest folkmoot known to be held here was by John Mansell, a king's justice, on St Paul's Day (29 June) in 1236, to announce that Henry III wished London to be well-governed and its liberties guarded. The Archbishop of Canterbury and the King attended the next such meeting we know of, in 1259, at which Londoners came to swear their allegiance to the latter and to his heirs (though under duress, as a royal army was holding the city gates at this time). They also gathered here later to swear allegiance to Henry's opponent Simon de Montfort.

=== 15th century ===
A Richard Walker from Worcester, a chaplain, pleaded guilty to sorcery charges here in c.1422 but, after forswearing such practices and being arraigned by the Bishop of Llandaff (then John de la Zouche), he was marched to Cheapside with his two magic books open upon him, where the books were burnt and he was freed without any other punishment. Reginald Pecock, Bishop of St Asaph, attacked Lollardy from this cross in 1447 but himself did public penance there in 1457 (by which time he was Bishop of Chichester) before a mob of 20,000 and the Archbishop of Canterbury, throwing various examples of his own heretical writings into a fire. Thomas Netter also preached against Lollardy here.

Bishop Thomas Kempe rebuilt the cross in 1449 in grand architectural form, as an open-air pulpit of mostly timber with room for three or four inside it, set on stone steps with a lead-covered roof and an ambulatory around it. This ambulatory would be closed in with a low wall in the early seventeenth-century. In all, the pulpit building formed an octagon about thirty-seven feet in diameter.

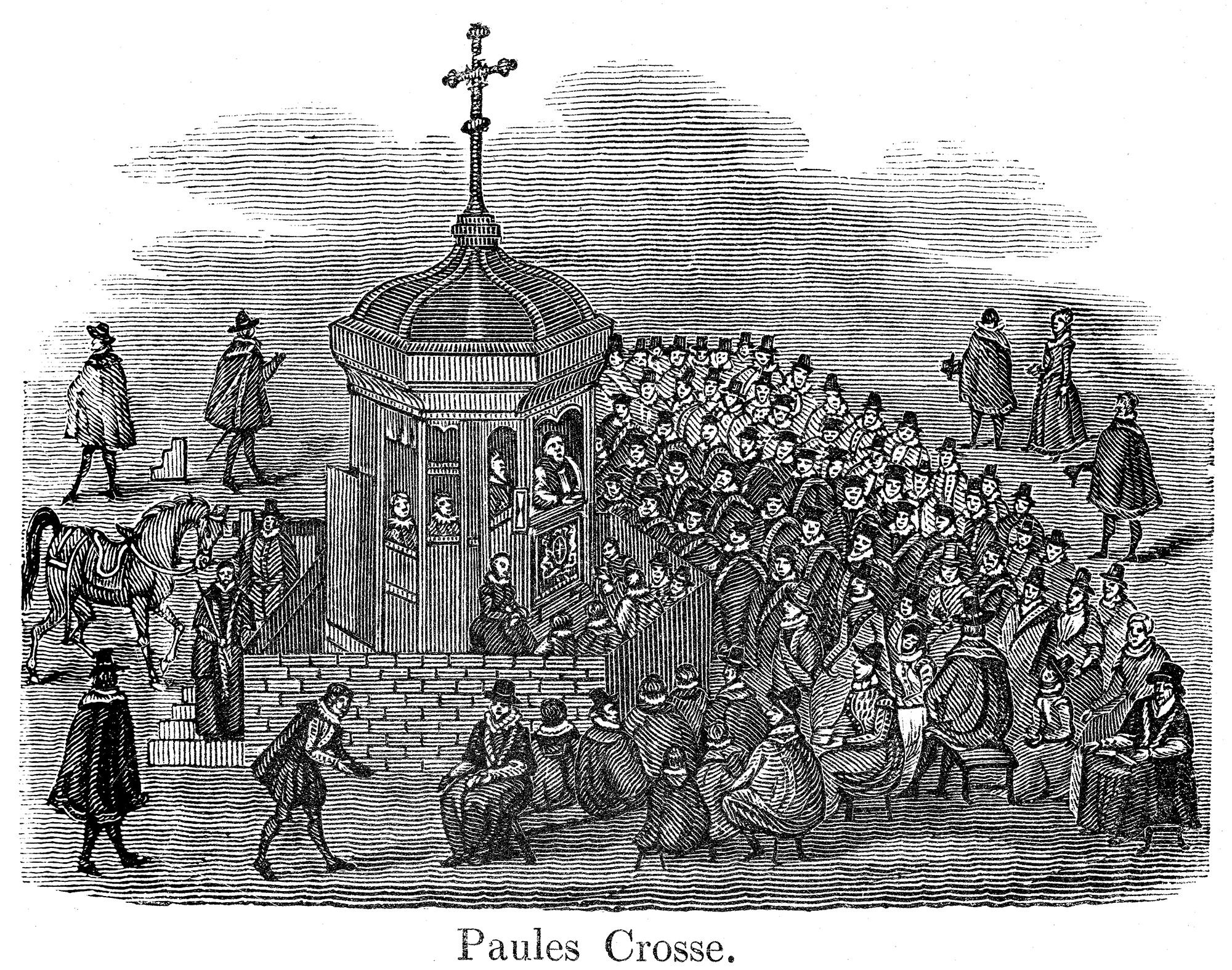
Open-air preaching at St Paul's Cross

Jane Shore, mistress of King Edward IV was brought before the cross in 1483 and divested "of all her splendour".

On Sunday 22 June 1483, a Cambridge Doctor of Theology, Ralph Shaa, was commissioned to preach a sermon from St Paul's Cross, in which he set forth Richard, Duke of Gloucester's claim to be King of England. This was a key stage in the process of Richard III usurping the throne of his nephew Edward V, one of the Princes in the Tower.

=== 16th century ===
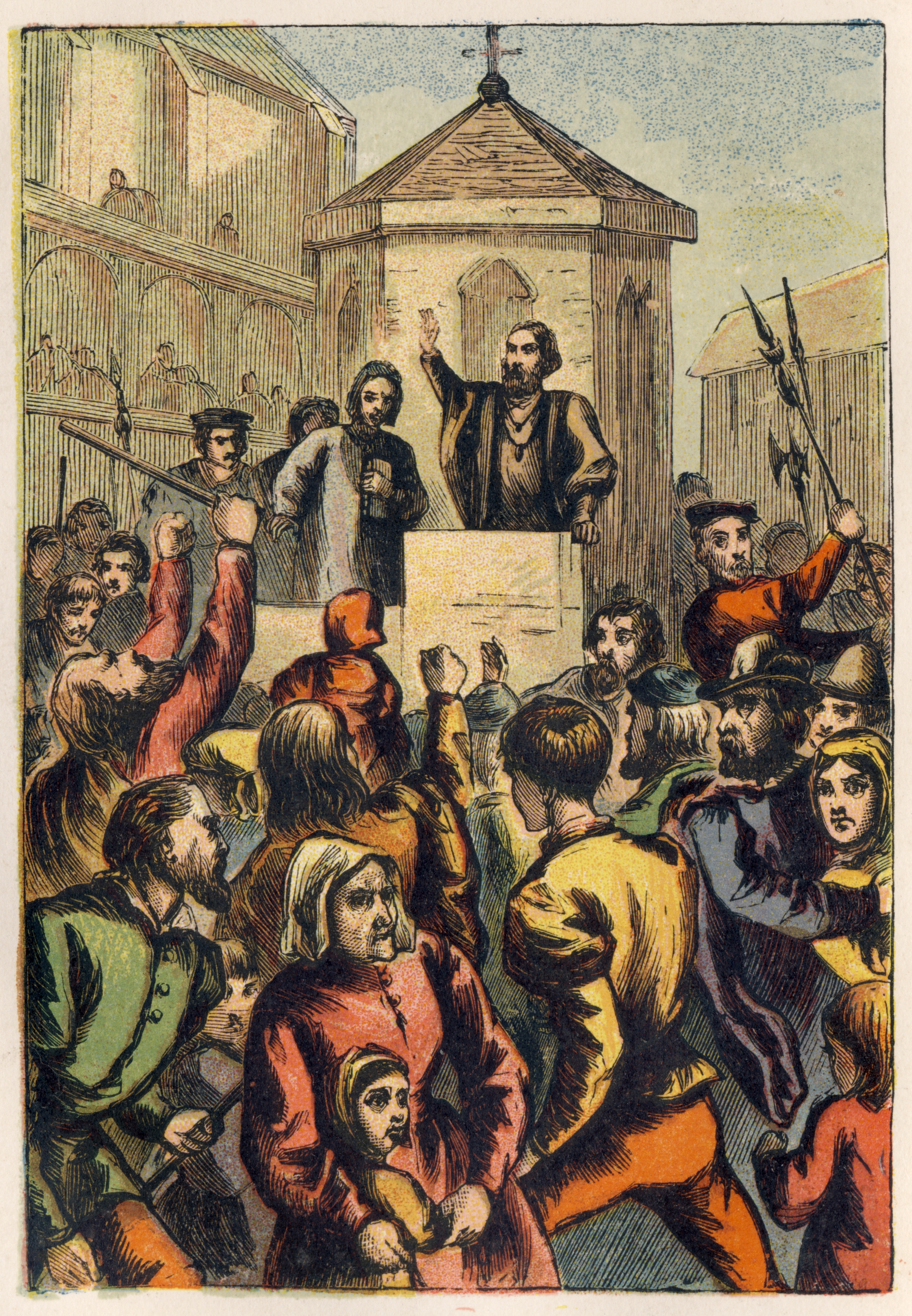
"John Bradford Appeasing the Riot at St Paul's Cross," from a later edition of 1563's Foxe's Book of Martyrs illustrated by Kronheim. According to Foxe, Mr. Bourne, a Catholic bishop and speaker, had nearly driven his Protestant listeners to riot, but Bradford came to his rescue and calmed the mob.

For much of the sixteenth and early seventeenth centuries, sermons were preached here on a weekly basis all year round. The preachers were appointed by the bishops of London. For important events or at politically sensitive times, senior clerics (including deans and bishops) would be called on to preach; on less important Sundays, the bishop and his chaplains looked to newly ordained preachers from Oxford and Cambridge, or to local London preachers, to fill the rota. Early in the reign of Queen Elizabeth I, it was sometimes difficult to find preachers willing to undertake a two-hour sermon at Paul's Cross. With better funding for the sermon series in the Jacobean period, however, preaching 'at the cross' became a mark of an ambitious young cleric. John Earle's 'bold forward man' would 'if hee bee a scholler ... ha's commonly stept into the Pulpit before a degree; ... and his next Sermon is at Pauls Crosse, and that printed'. Indeed, from the 1580s onwards, it was increasingly usual to print the sermons for distribution to a wider audience; approximately 370 Paul's Cross sermons are now extant, with over 300 titles surviving in print. Because the pulpit stood in one of the few open spaces within an increasingly crowded city, and because royal proclamations were often delivered here, Paul's Cross was the site of several political disturbances in the early modern period. It was a speech here that triggered the 1517 Evil May Day anti-foreigner riots. Ultra-Lutheran Robert Barnes attacked Stephen Gardiner from it, and in 1566 Matthew Hutton, later Archbishop of York, preached here. The first sermon preached here after Catholic Queen Mary's accession (by Bishop Bourne) provoked a riot – a dagger was thrown at Bourne (but missed him, sticking in one of the side posts) and he had to be rushed to safety in St Paul's School. Thus, Mary's successor Elizabeth I kept the pulpit empty for a long time after her accession to keep the people from rioting. However, when it finally came to Dr Samson's appearance at the Cross to announce Elizabeth's religious policy, the keys to the Cross's pulpit were found to be mislaid and the Lord Mayor ordered the door to be forced. In the early years of Elizabeth's reign, Paul's Cross was one of the most important means of popularising the Elizabethan Settlement. On 15 June 1559, John Jewel preached his famous 'Challenge' sermon (which he would repeat on 26 November that year), in which he promised to convert to Roman Catholicism if his opponents could show evidence for specific Catholic teachings and practices from the first six hundred years after Christ. The so-called 'Challenge Controversy' started by this sermon led to ninety-six publications by 1570. There was also preaching against the Puritan Movement in 1572, in response to the Admonition Controversy, and anti-puritan preaching became more common after 1589 when Richard Bancroft launched an attack on puritan activism in a sermon preached 9 February 1588. During the Essex Rebellion, the Earl timed his arrival in London so that he and his followers arrived at St Paul's just before the end of the Paul's Cross sermon, in the hope of gaining the support of the London aldermen.

==== Audience ====
References to Paul's Cross sermons in contemporary diaries and other texts suggest that the sermons were popular in the reigns of Elizabeth I and James VI and I but that they declined in popularity in the 1630s, particularly after 1635 when they moved into the relatively confined space of the Cathedral choir. One Elizabethan guide to learning French, Claudius Hollybrand's The French Schoolmaster (1573) describes a visit to the Paul's Cross sermons and reports that members of the court and senior clerics might be seen there. Attendance by the Lord Mayor and aldermen of London and their wives was far more common than the nobility, however. The guildsmen also attended Paul's Cross sermons, often sitting together formally in their guilds for special occasions like the Accession Day sermon. Attendance at the Paul's Cross sermons became an important means for the corporation to make their civic rituals compatible with Protestant teachings in the years after the Reformation.

=== The end of Paul's Cross ===
William Dugdale claimed that the pulpit cross was destroyed under the Ordinance for 'Removing monuments of Idolatry' in 1643 at the start of the First English Civil War. Archival evidence demonstrates that the pulpit cross had already been destroyed by 1641, however, and it is most likely that the pulpit was taken down in 1635, when this area of the Cathedral close was used as a masons' yard during renovation work on the cathedral.

=== 20th century ===
Between 1908 and 1910 a new structure was erected near the site of Paul's Cross, from funds provided by the will of the barrister Henry Charles Richards. Richards had hoped that the medieval preaching cross would be reconstructed, but the Dean and Chapter of St Paul's Cathedral decided that this would be out of keeping with the architectural setting, Sir Christopher Wren having rebuilt the cathedral in the 17th century. The resulting monument is to a Baroque revival design by Sir Reginald Blomfield, with a statue of Saint Paul by Sir Bertram Mackennal standing on a Doric column of Portland stone. The cathedral authorities' use of Richards's funds aroused a short-lived controversy. In 1972 the monument was listed at Grade II.

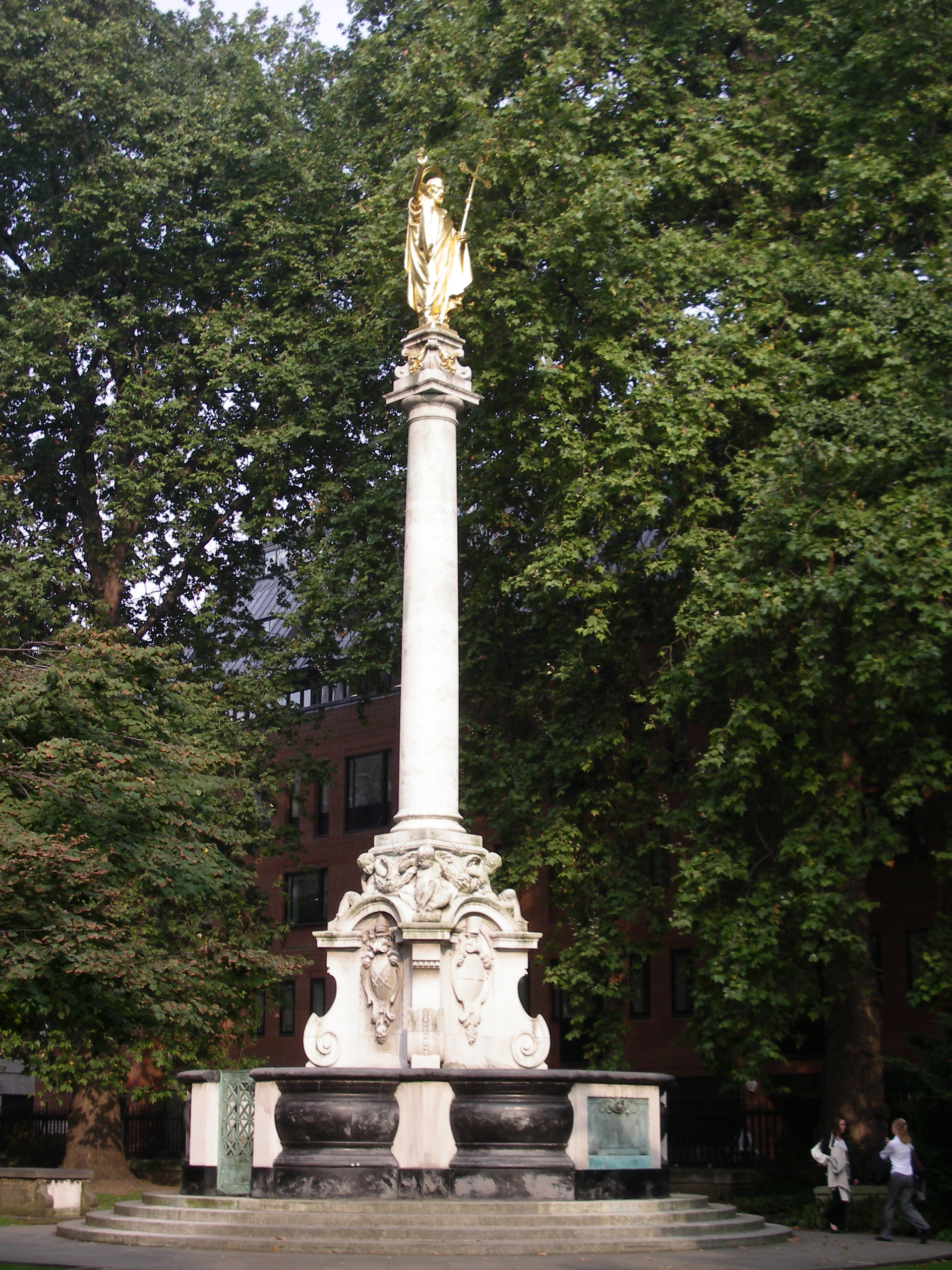
Sir Reginald Blomfield's Paul's Cross

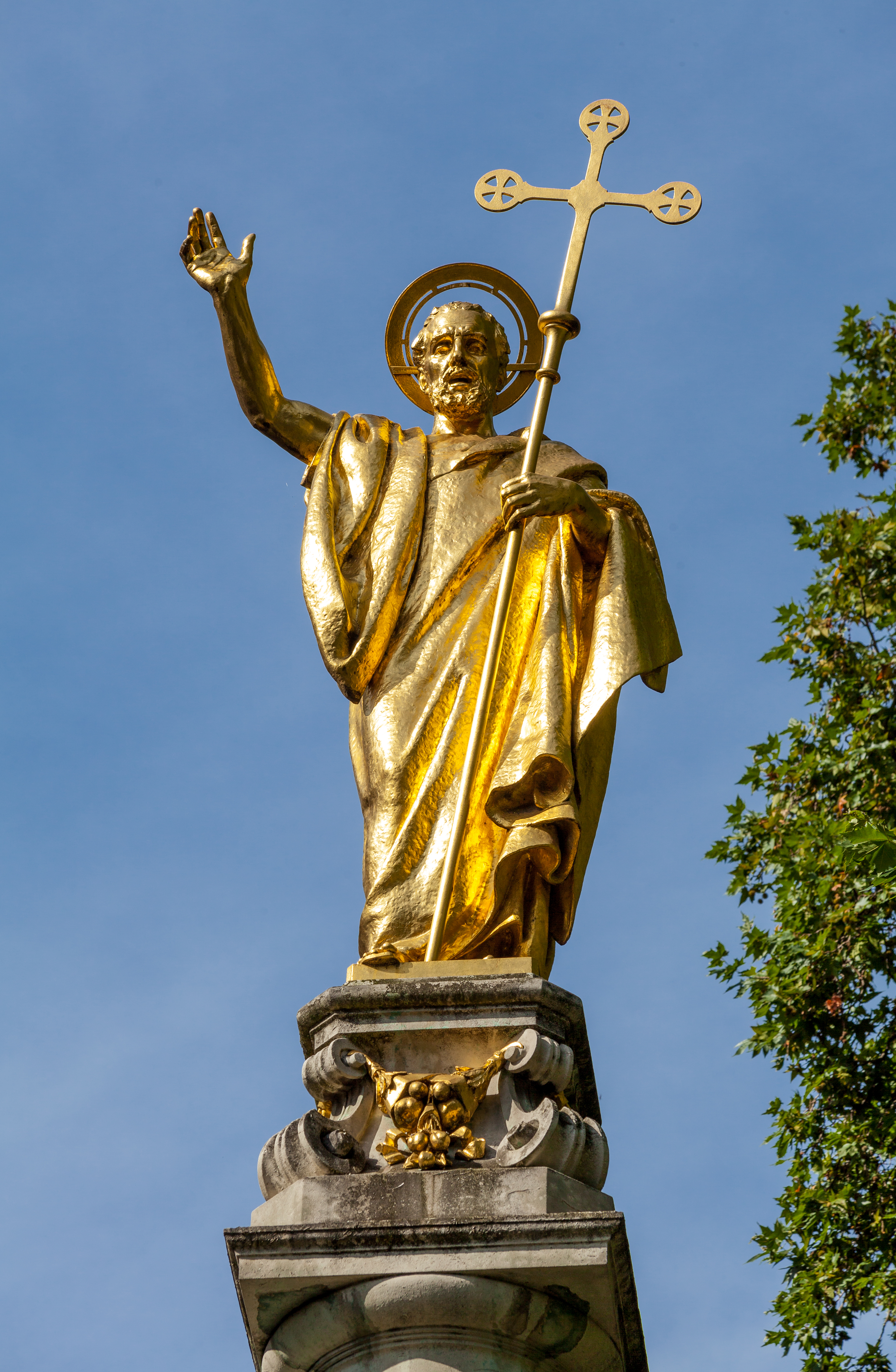
The statue of Saint Paul by Sir Bertram Mackennal

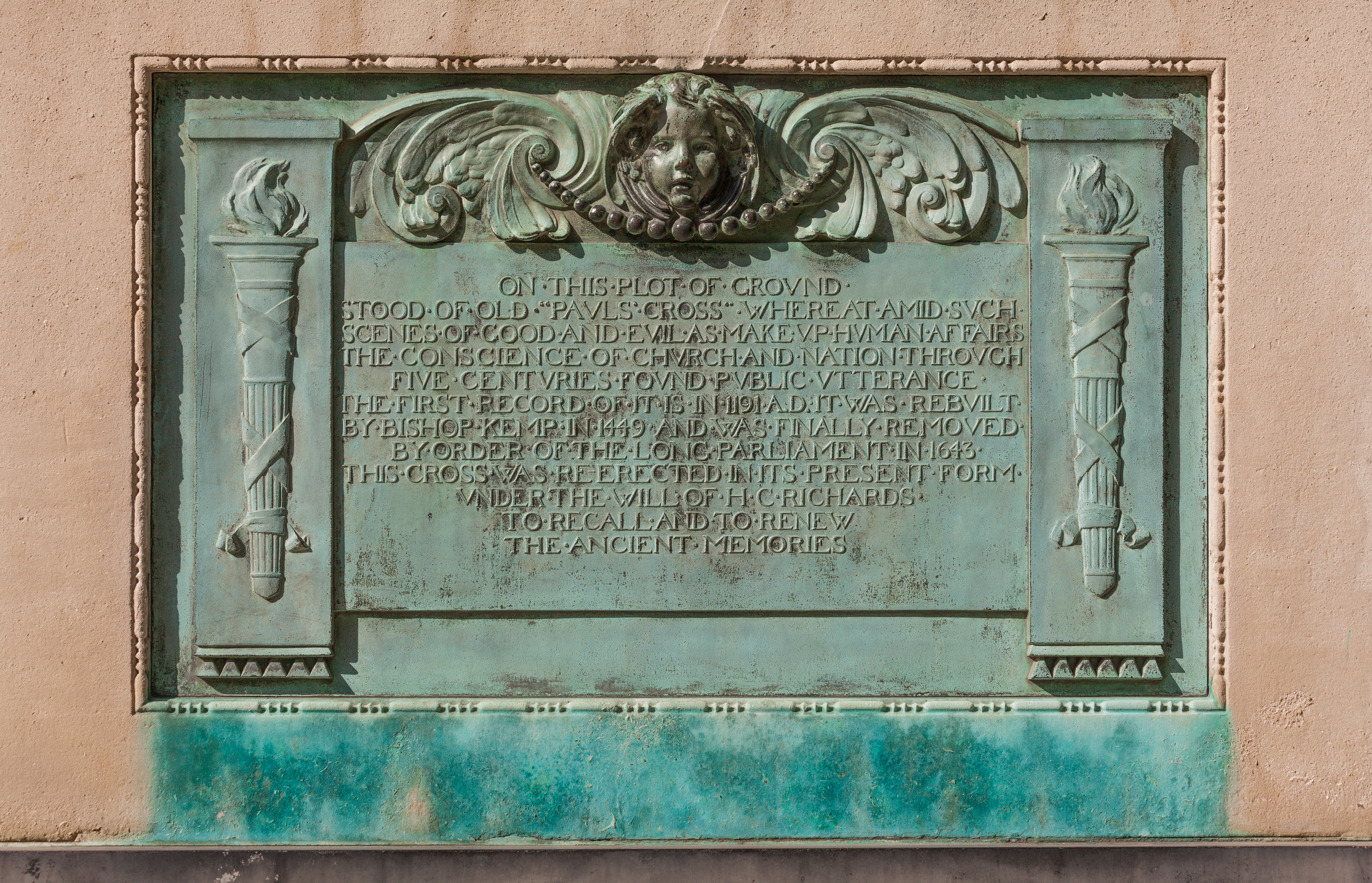
Plaque on the 20th-century Paul's Cross commemorating its precursor
