= Anne Poyntz =

Anne Poyntz (died 1554) was an English courtier. She served in the position of "mother of the maids" in the household of queen Mary I of England. She owned a significant collection of jewellery.

== Family background ==
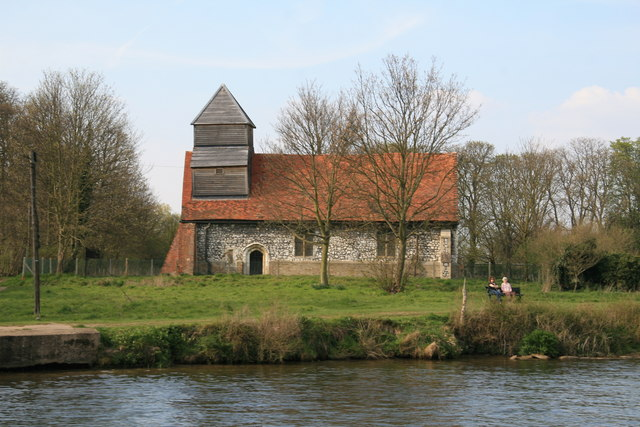
St. Mary Magdalene's, Boveney, Buckinghamshire.

Anne was from Buckinghamshire, a sister and heir of Isaac Sibilles or Sibelies, and daughter of Abraham Sibilles of Boveney who was MP for Windsor in 1491 and clerk of Windsor Castle. Her first husband was John Cheney of Sittingbourne and Ufton in Tunstall, Kent, a relative of the influential Thomas Cheney, Treasurer of the Royal Household (1539–1558), John Cheney provided food at Faversham for the flotilla of barges that brought Charles V to meet Henry VIII in June 1522. Thomas Cheney was retained by Mary I in 1553.

Their daughter Frances married John Astley, a member of a family whose estates were at Melton Constable in Norfolk and Hillmorton in Warwickshire. He was a half-brother of the courtier John Astley, whose mother, Anne, was a sister of Elizabeth Boleyn.

=== John Pointz of North Ockendon ===
Anne married, secondly, John Poyntz of North Ockendon (died 1547), a son of William Poyntz and Elizabeth Shaa, a sister of the London mayor and goldsmith John Shaa. Poyntz was a receiver of rents for the queens consort of Henry VIII. He is sometimes confused with John Poyntz of Alderley, Gloucestershire. A drawing by Holbein is now thought to depict John Poyntz of Alderley. John Pointz of North Ockendon was involved the fortification of Tilbury, where he was a supervisor of building work in 1545. He was an esquire at the reception of Anne of Cleves in 1539, listed as "John Poyntes of South Ukkington".

John Poyntz had a sister, who married Thomas Sponer, a London goldsmith. John Poyntz's younger brother, Thomas Poyntz (died 1562), was a merchant in Antwerp. William Tyndale, a Protestant writer who had been exiled after writing in support of the cause of Katherine of Aragon, was staying with him when he was arrested in 1535. Thomas Poyntz wrote to John and his wife, hoping that he had influence at the English court to help. Armed with a letter from Thomas Cromwell, the younger Poyntz attempted in vain to secure Tyndale's release. Tyndale had been tutor to the children of Anne Walsh née Poyntz (died 1528) at Little Sodbury, a distant relative of the Ockendon family.

== Household of Mary I ==
A "Master" and "Mistress Poyntz" are named in the household accounts of Lady Mary, later Mary I of England. In December 1537, her servant brought a present for Lady Mary. As a widow, Anne Poyntz seems to have retained her rights at North Ockendon, and was able to present a clergyman to the benefice.

Poyntz was "mother of the maids" in the household of Mary I of England in 1553. The role was to supervise young aristocratic women who were placed in the royal household. Her own granddaughter, Anne Astley, was also at court, possibly as her servant. Mary gave her ladies and gentlewomen pairs of "billiments", gold bands to wear on their head dresses or French hoods at her coronation. According to a list published by John Strype, another woman, Mistress Baynham, took the place of "mother of maids" during Mary's Royal Entry on 30 September 1553, but other sources name "Mistress Poynes".

After the death of Mistress Poyntz, in 1557, there were six maids of honour; Anne Somerset, Jane Seymour, Cecily Arundel, Mary Mansel (who married Thomas Southwell), Mary Howard, and Margaret Cooke. Dorothy Broughton was the mother of the maids. She may have been a connection of Sir Robert Broughton (MP) grandfather of Thomas Cheney's second wife. Sir Robert Broughton's second wife was Dorothy, the sister of Margery Wentworth (c. 1478–1550).

== Death and memorial ==
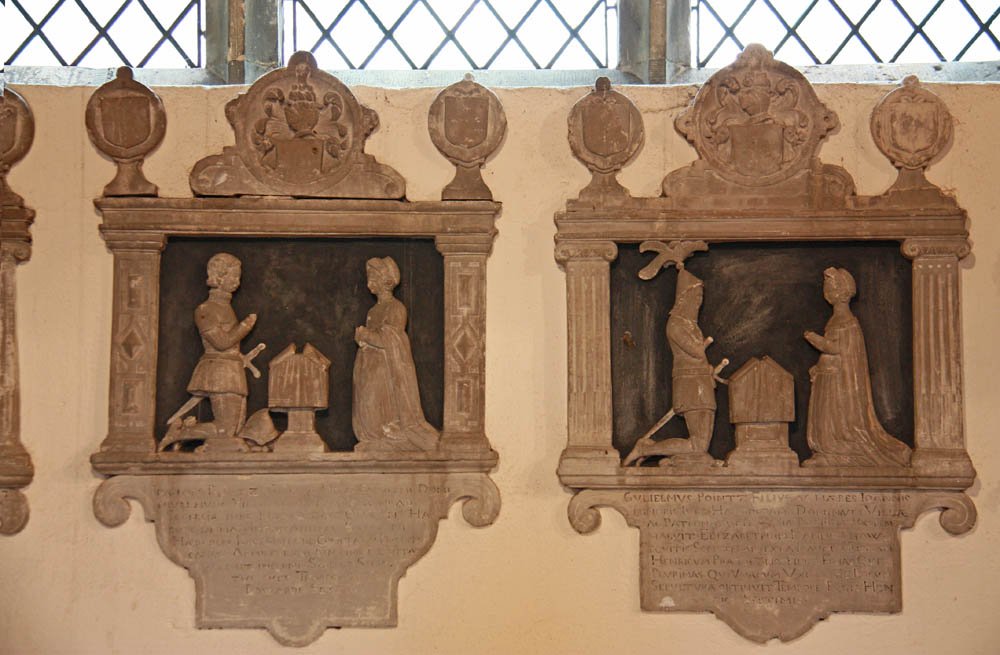
Memorial to John and Anne Poyntz, (left), St Mary Magdalene, North Ockendon

Anne Poyntz died in May 1554, after a period of illness at court when she was nursed by Anne Astley. She was buried either at St Dunstan-in-the-West, where there was a commemorative stone with her heraldry, or at St Mary Magdalene, North Ockendon, where her husband was buried in 1547.

Dorothy Broughton was appointed in her place as Mother of the Maidens. Dorothy Broughton was summoned to court from Woodstock Palace where she was serving in the household of Lady Elizabeth, who was in the care of Henry Bedingfeld. In turn, Margaret Morton was sent to Woodstock to fill Broughton's place.

By 1605, Thomas Poyntz's son Gabriel Poyntz placed a series of memorials to the family in the church in the former Lady Chapel at North Ockendon, including a depiction of Anne and John Poyntz. The monuments are attributed to the Johnson workshop.

Her granddaughter, Anne (or Dorothy) Astley, married Richard L'Estrange, a brother of Nicholas L'Estrange of Hunstanton. Susanna Poyntz, a daughter of Thomas Poyntz, married Richard Saltonstall, Lord Mayor of London, her nephew was the translator Adrian Poyntz, who dedicated his New and singular patternes & workes of linnen (London, 1591) and Treasure of the Soule (London, 1596) to her and Richard Saltonstall.

== Tudor jewellery and Anne Poyntz' will ==
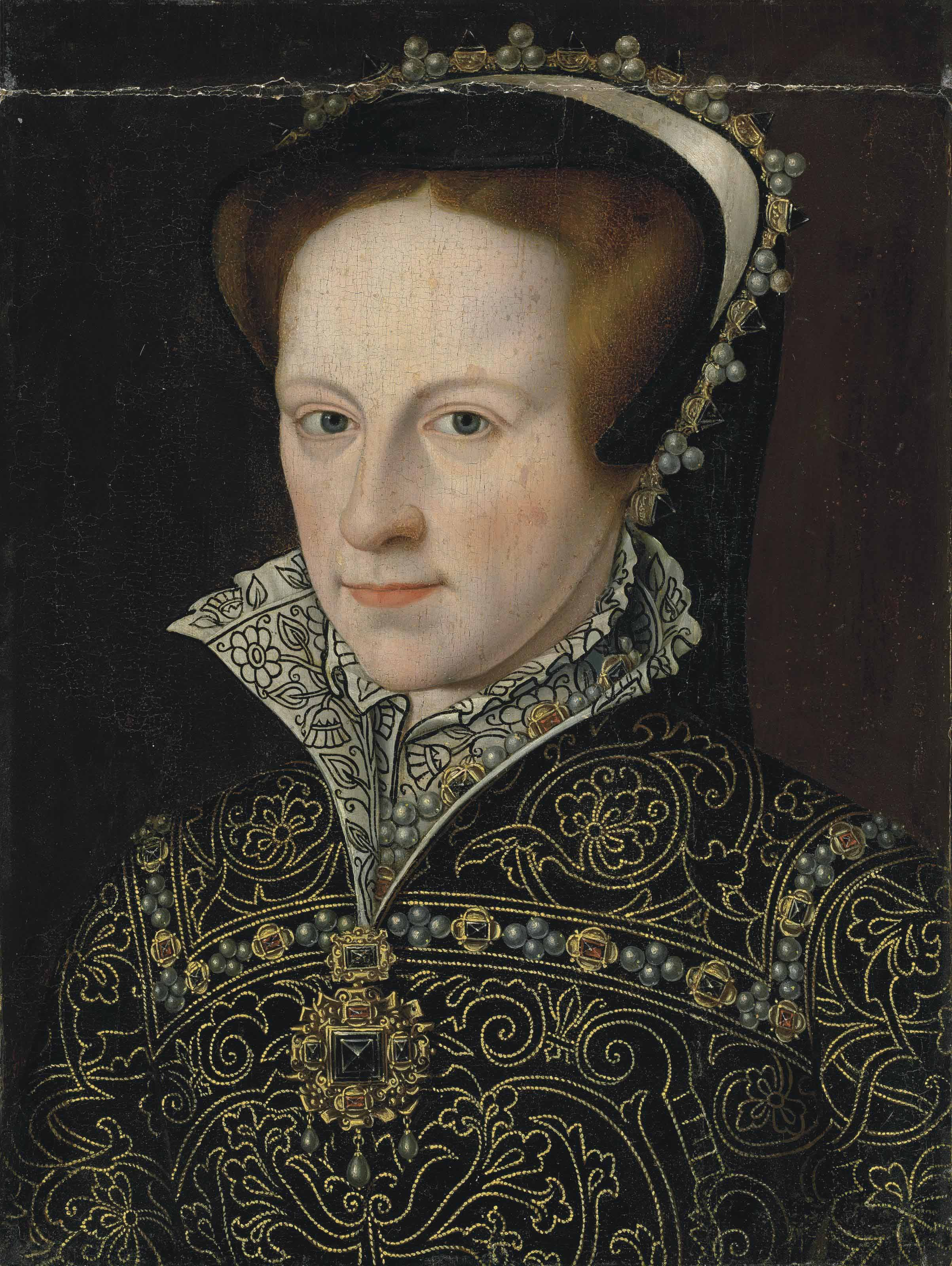
Mary I of England gave jewels to Anne Poyntz.

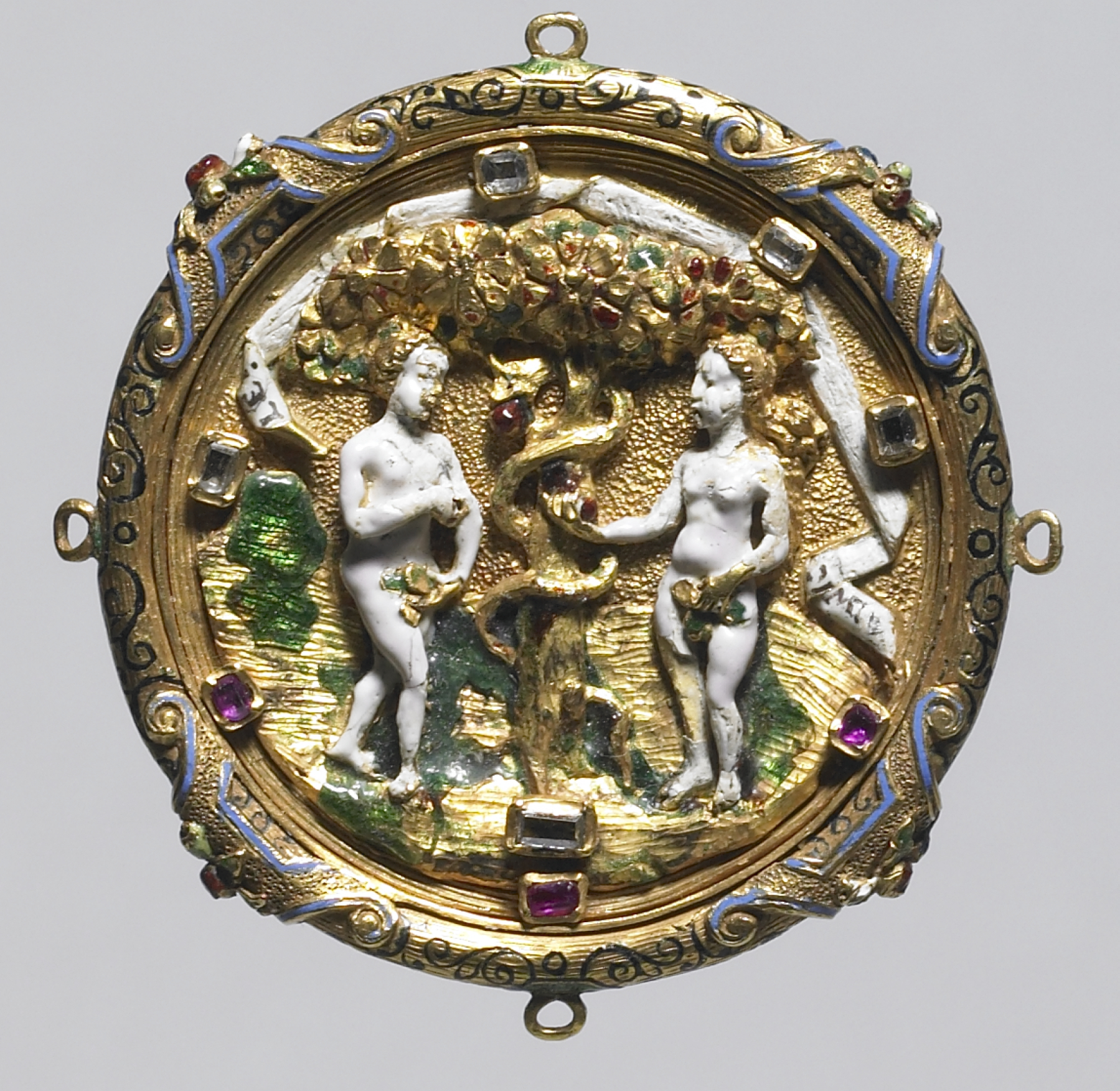
Anne Poyntz owned a gold brooch depicting Adam and Eve, which may have resembled a renaissance hat badge held at the Walters Art Museum, Baltimore.

Anne Poyntz made two wills, one in 1550 and in May 1554, shortly before her death, which were both proved or probated. The wills were published in an abbreviated form in 1865. They include a number of bequests to the Astley family of jewellery. These illustrate the exchanges of gifts at the Tudor court. Gifts to Mary from the queen include her coronation "upper billiment", and a nether billiment set with 155 pearls which had been a gift from Mary on another occasion. A similar "upper billiment" with a crimson velvet gown to wear at the coronation was included in the will of the husband of Mary's lady in waiting, Cecily Dabridgecourt, Lady Mansel.

These "biliments" were worn on French hoods at Mary's court. An indication of how they were worn occurs in a warrant for fabric for another of Mary's gentlewomen, Mary or Jane Russell. In June 1554, Russell was given "twoo yards of French velvet to make her Frenche hoods and bylementts, halffe a yarde of satten to lyne the said hoodes", one yard of satin, white and red "to make her nether bylymentts". The nether biliment or habilment of "goldsmith work" was worn at the front edge, and the upper biliment behind, near, or over the crown of the head. Mary had a French hood as early as 1520.

Monarchs exchanged gifts with their courtiers on courtiers on New Year's Day. A silver gilt "cruse" (a drinking pot) in Anne Poyntz's will had been Mary's New Year's Day gift for 1554. Dorothy Broughton and the maids of honour received "free gifts" of similar cruses in 1556.

The bequests of other jewels do not specify if they had been royal gifts. Anne Astley was bequeathed an "edge for a billiment" of 45 round garnets alternating with 48 gold pieces with blue enamelling, Anne Poyntz's gold chain, and a figurative tablet or locket featuring the temptation of Adam and Eve "by the spirit figured over their heads", with the mottoes:

"Come forth Trowgthe thoughe falsehoode be wrothe"

The other side of this piece depicted a man holding flowers and a woman holding a heart, encircled by the inscription:

"Take you here my harte with love, and love more"

The Walters Art Museum in Baltimore has a Tudor hat badge depicting Adam and Eve, though its inscription is now mostly effaced, and Sir Thomas Palmer's New Year's Day gift from Henry VIII in 1532 was a tablet of gold with a device of Adam and Eve and a hanging pearl. Anne Astley was also to have a ruby ring that had been a gift from Henry Clifford, 2nd Earl of Cumberland, whose daughter Margaret Clifford was briefly a maid at Mary's court before her marriage to Henry Stanley, 4th Earl of Derby.

Bess Astley was given a "Turkey bean" garnished with gold with the "H" and "K" initials of Henry VIII and Katherine of Aragon on either side, perhaps a gift at a Twelfth Night feast. The initials decorated fabrics and costumes at the Westminster Tournament of 1511.

Anne Poyntz bequeathed her eldest granddaughter Bridget Astley a brooch depicting a woman "enamylled" with a caged bird with a French proverb, "Miex suys bocage que toy dan la cage" (Better to be bird in the wood than caged), and to another granddaughter Rebecca Astley, a brooch with "a woman sitting upon a wheel, and clawing a lion at the back", Fortune and Hercules. A grandson, Cheney Astley, was bequeathed a jewel depicting the Virgin Mary, "a Lady assumpted all of golde with her sonne in armes, and sitting on the half moon with a ruby stone in yt" with a ruby ring, and other items.

These pieces are connected with service, display, and gift exchange at the Tudor court. Jewels circulated in a gift-giving culture, and document an elite female network. A roll of gifts at Mary's court survives from 1557 listing gifts and givers. A 19th-century historian of the family mistakenly assumed that the jewels in the will were family heirlooms gifted to her by a profligate husband.
