= Ralph Shaa =

English theologian (d. 1484)

Ralph Shaa (sometimes erroneously called John Shaa; died 1484) was a 15th-century English theologian, the half-brother of the Lord Mayor of London, Edmund Shaa. Shaa (pronounced and sometimes spelled "Shaw") played a minor but pivotal role in the Wars of the Roses by preaching a sermon on 22 June 1483 which claimed that Edward IV (as whose chaplain he had served) had already been betrothed to Eleanor Butler at the time of his marriage to Elizabeth Woodville, and that Edward V was therefore illegitimate and had no claim to the throne.

Shaa is mentioned as "Doctor Shaw" in Shakespeare's play Richard III.
