= Thomas Poyntz =

English merchant (d. 1562)

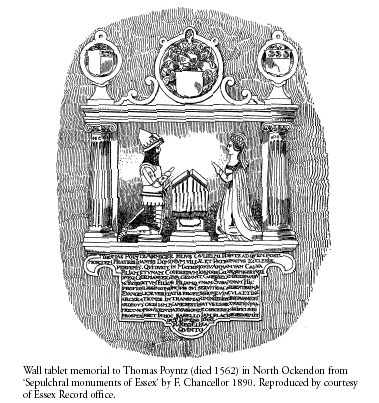
Thomas Poyntz memorial, Church of St Mary Magdalene, North Ockendon

Thomas Poyntz (died May 1562) was an English merchant resident in Antwerp in the sixteenth century. He was a member of the Worshipful Company of Grocers.

== Poyntz and Tyndale ==
He invited the English cleric and translator William Tyndale to stay at his house while a refugee there. However in 1535 Henry Philips tricked Tyndale into leaving the safety of the Poyntz household whilst Poyntz attended the Easter fair in Bergen op Zoom.

Thomas Poyntz wrote to his older brother in London, hoping that he could plead for intervention for Tyndale at the court of Henry VIII. Despite a letter from Thomas Cromwell, Thomas Poyntz was not able to secure Tyndale's release.

== North Ockendon ==
Thomas was the son of William Poyntz (d. 1504) who held the manor of North Ockendon. His brother, John, inherited the estate. However when John died without issue Thomas inherited the estate in 1547. John's widow was Anne Poyntz (d. 1554), mother of the maids in 1553.

Poyntz was buried at the Church of St Mary Magdalene, North Ockendon, or at St Dunstan-in-the-West in London. His son Gabriel Poyntz placed a monument to him and his German-born wife, Joan Calvi, at St Mary Magdalene, North Ockendon.
